= List of French composers =

This is an alphabetical list of composers from France.

== A–B ==
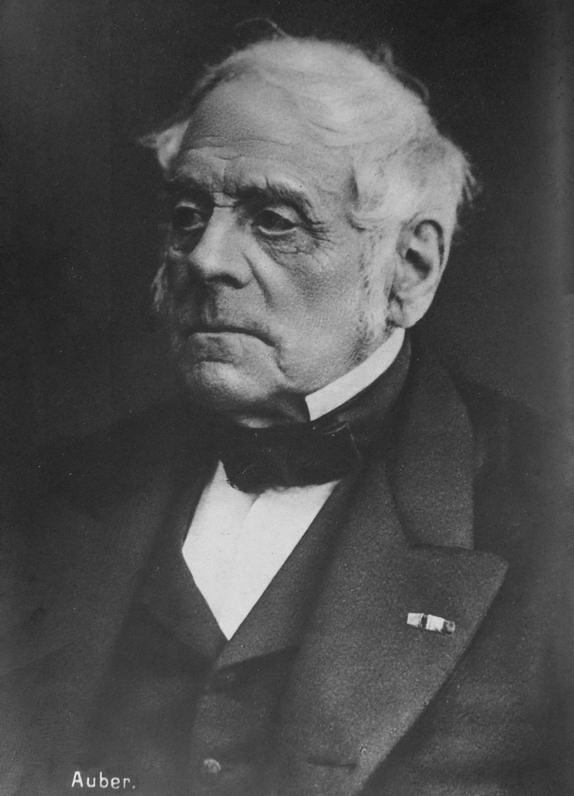
Daniel Auber

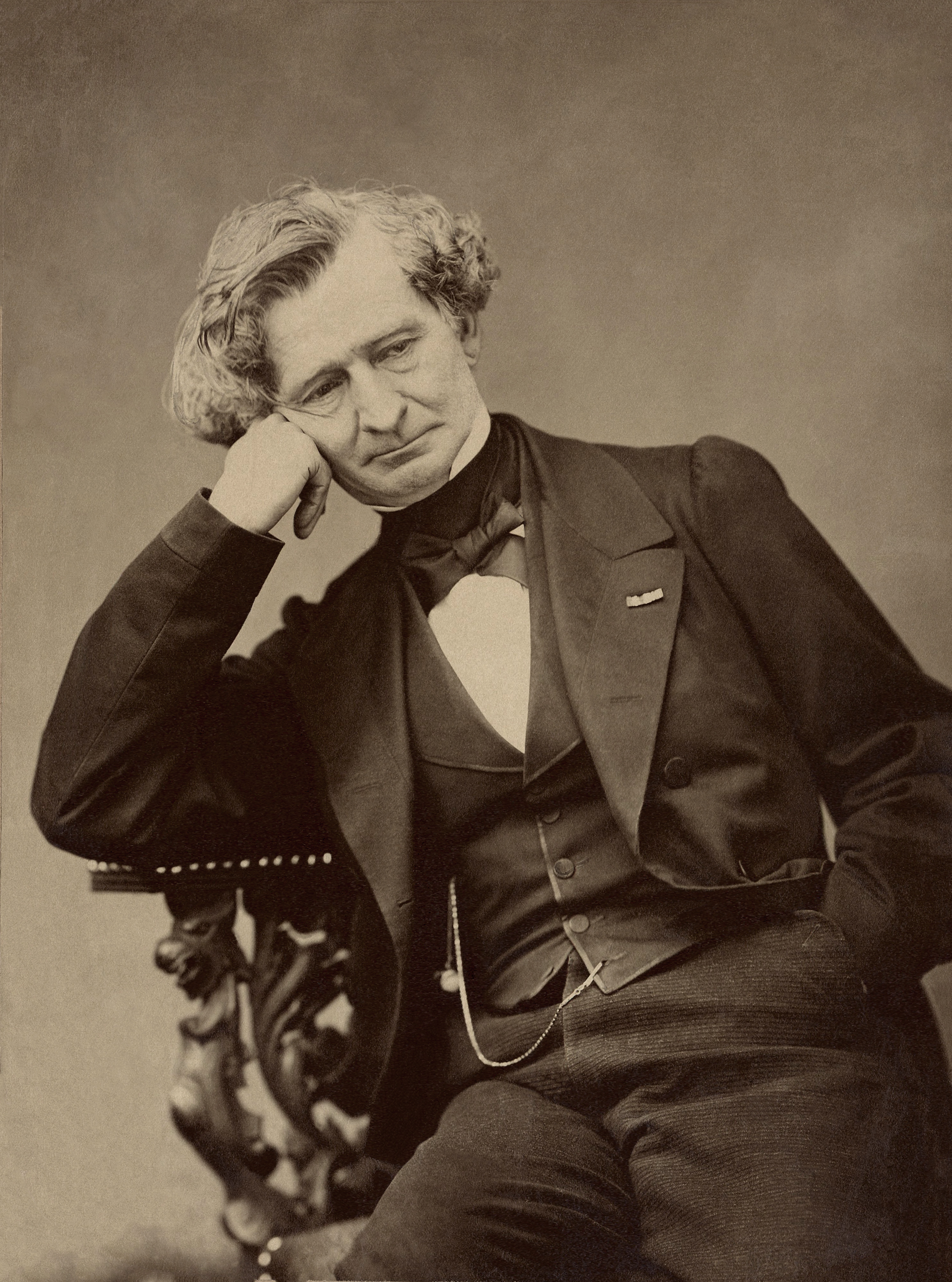
Hector Berlioz

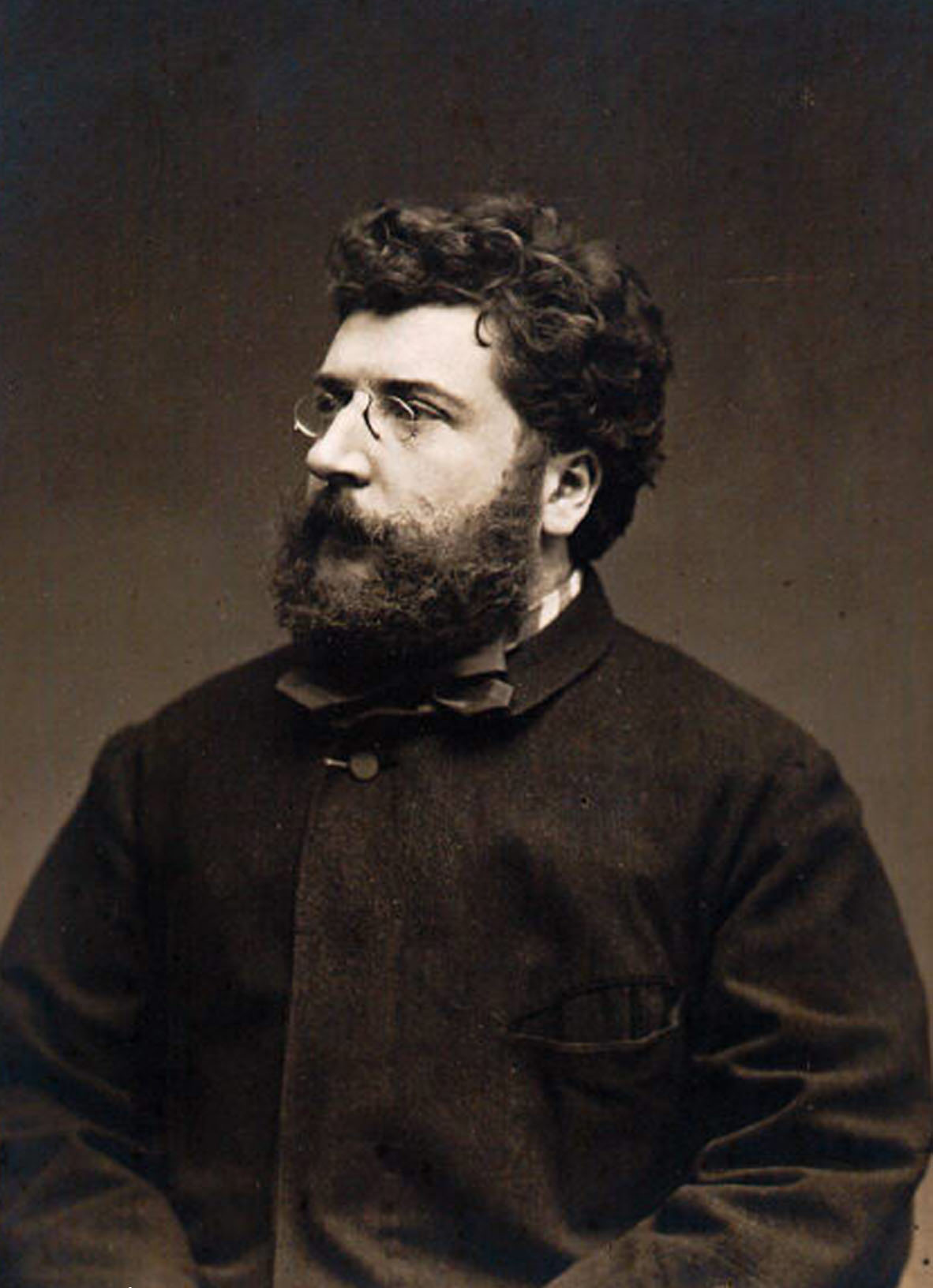
Georges Bizet

Pierre Boulez

- Eryck Abecassis (born 1956)
- Jean-Baptiste Accolay (1833–1900)
- Frédéric Acquaviva (born 1967)
- Adam (fl. 1420–30)
- Adolphe Adam (1803–1856)
- François d'Agincourt (1684–1758)
- Léopold Aimon (1779–1866)
- Jehan Alain (1911–1940)
- Paul Alday (c. 1763 – 1835)
- Charles-Valentin Alkan (1813–1888)
- Joseph-Henri Altès (1826–1895)
- Jean-Claude Amiot (born 1939)
- Gilbert Amy (born 1936)
- Édouard Ignace Andlauer (1830–1909)
- Jean-Henri d'Anglebert (1629–1691)
- Jean-Baptiste Arban (1825–1889)
- Daniel Auber (1782–1871)
- Jacques Aubert (1689–1753)
- Louis Aubert (1877–1968)
- Olivier Aubert (1763–c.1830)
- Tony Aubin (1907–1981)
- Edmond Audran (1840–1901)
- Georges Auric (1899–1983)
- Artus Aux-Cousteaux (c. 1590 – 1656)
- Nicolas Bacri (born 1961)
- Pierre Baillot (1771–1842)
- Claude Balbastre (1724–1799)
- Auguste Barbereau (1799–1879)
- Jean Barraqué (1928–1973)
- Yves Baudrier (1906–1988)
- François Bazin (1816–1878)
- Désiré Beaulieu (1791–1863)
- Hector Berlioz (1803–1869)
- Louise Bertin (1805–1877)
- Christophe Bertrand (1981–2010)
- Henri Betti (1917–2005)
- Georges Bizet (1838–1875)
- Adolphe Blanc (1828–1885)
- Nicolas-Charles Bochsa (1789–1856)
- François-Adrien Boieldieu (1775–1834)
- Joseph Bodin de Boismortier (1689–1755)
- Michel Blavet (1700–1768)
- Léon Boëllmann (1862–1897)
- Claude Bolling (1930–2020)
- Mélanie Bonis (1858–1937)
- Charles Bordes (1863–1909)
- Lili Boulanger (1893–1918)
- Nadia Boulanger (1887–1979)
- Pierre Boulez (1925–2016)
- Joseph Boulogne, Chevalier de St George (1745–1799)
- Louis-Albert Bourgault-Ducoudray (1840–1910)
- Laurent Boutonnat (born 1961)
- Eugène Bozza (1905–1991)
- Jean-Baptiste Bréval (1753–1823)
- Antoine Brumel (1460 – 1515 ?)
- Clément Broutin (1851–1889)
- Alfred Bruneau (1857–1934)
- Henri Büsser (1872–1973)

== C–D ==
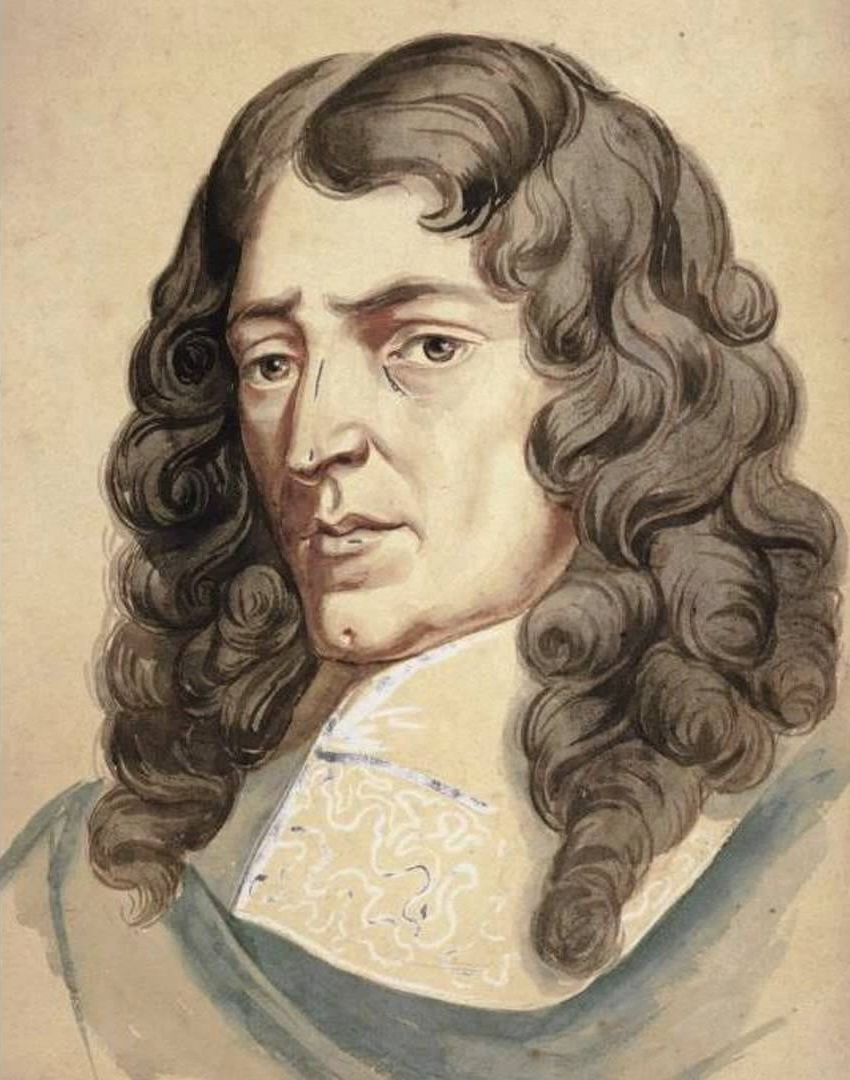
Marc-Antoine Charpentier

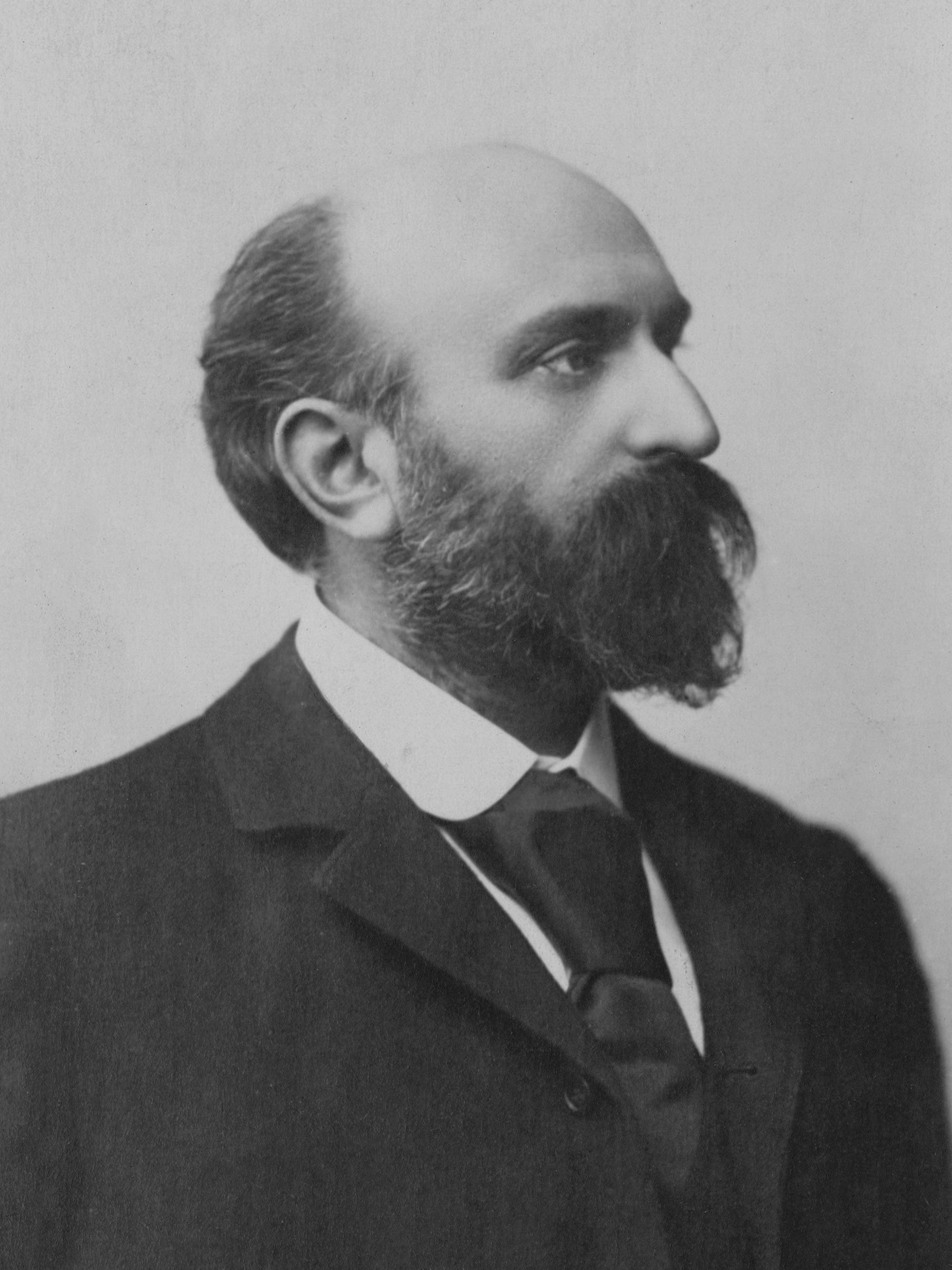
Ernest Chausson

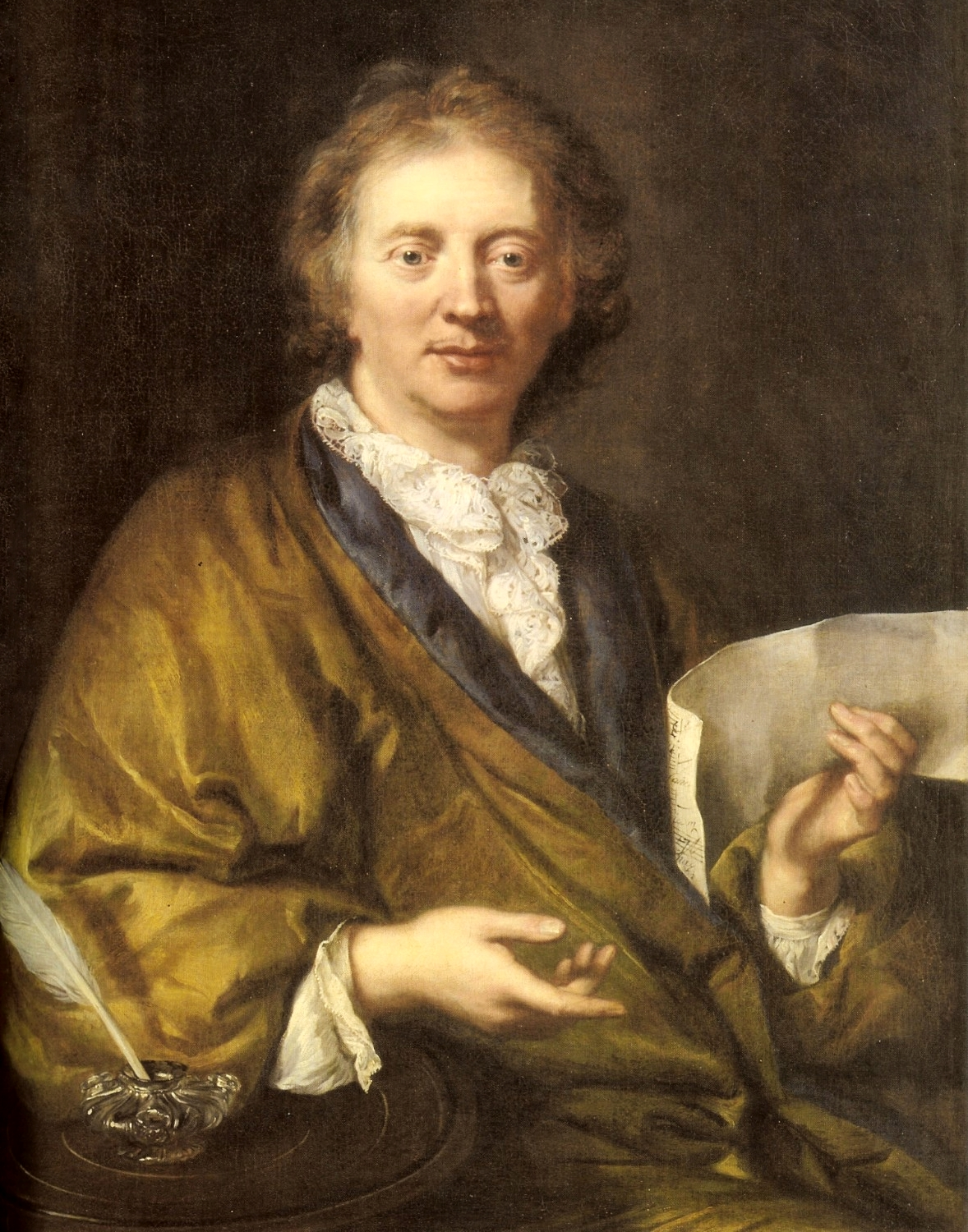
François Couperin

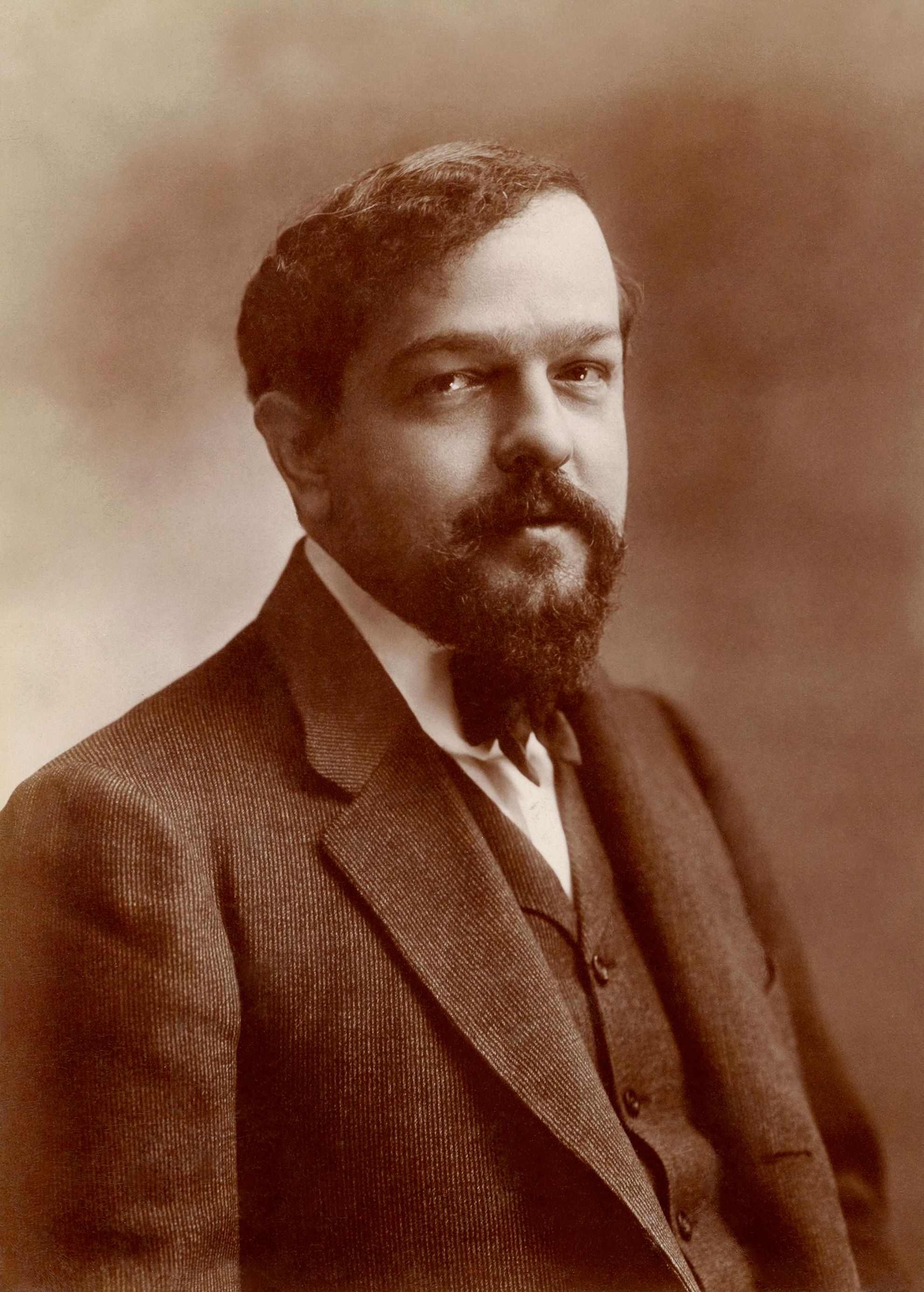
Claude Debussy

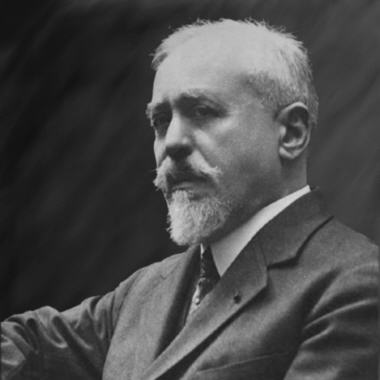
Paul Dukas

- Pablo Caliero (1910–2002)
- André Campra (1660–1744)
- Joseph Canteloube (1879–1957)
- André Caplet (1878–1925)
- Jacques Castérède (1926–2014)
- Alexis de Castillon (1838–1873)
- Charles Simon Catel (1773–1830)
- Pierre Certon (c.1510/20–1572)
- Emmanuel Chabrier (1841–1894)
- Cécile Chaminade (1857–1944)
- Jacques Champion de Chambonnières (c. 1601 – 1672)
- Gustave Charpentier (1860–1956)
- Marc-Antoine Charpentier (1643–1704)
- Ernest Chausson (1855–1899)
- Charles-Alexis Chauvet (1837–1871)
- Nicolas Chedeville (1705–1782)
- Frédéric Chopin (1810–1849)
- Hedwige Chrétien (1859–1944)
- Aloÿs Claussmann (1850–1926)
- Louis-Nicolas Clérambault (1676–1749)
- Michel Colombier (1939–2004)
- Loÿset Compère (c. 1445 – 1518)
- Napoléon Coste (1805–1883)
- Bruno Coulais (born 1954)
- François Couperin (1668–1733)
- Louis Couperin (c. 1626 – 1661)
- Jean Cras (1879–1932)
- Ferdinand de Craywinckel (1820 – c. 1888)
- Nicolas Dalayrac (1753–1809)
- Jean-Michel Damase (1928–2013)
- Jules Danbé (1840–1905)
- Charles Dancla (1817–1907)
- Jean-François Dandrieu (c. 1682 – 1738)
- Adolphe Danhauser (1835–1896)
- Louis-Claude Daquin (1694–1772)
- Félicien David (1810–1876)
- Claude Debussy (1862–1918)
- Louis Deffès (1819–1900)
- Michel Richard Delalande (1657–1726)
- Georges Delerue (1925–1992)
- Léo Delibes (1836–1891)
- Charles Delioux (1825–1915)
- Jeanne Demessieux (1921–1968)
- Jean Derbès (1937–1982)
- Alfred Desenclos (1912–1971)
- Adolphe Deslandres (1840–1911)
- Alexandre Desplat (born 1961)
- Louis Diémer (1843–1919)
- Victor Dourlen (1780–1864)
- Théodore Dubois (1837–1924)
- François Dufault (before 1604 – c.1672)
- Guillaume Dufay (c. 1397 – 1474)
- Maurice Duhamel (1884–1940)
- Paul Dukas (1865–1935)
- Henri Duparc (1848–1933)
- Gabriel Dupont (1878–1914)
- Jean-Louis Duport (1749–1819)
- Jean-Pierre Duport (1741–1818)
- Marcel Dupré (1886–1971)
- Émile Durand (1830–1903)
- Joël-François Durand (born 1954)
- Louis Durey (1888–1979)
- Marie-Madeleine Duruflé (1921–1999)
- Maurice Duruflé (1902–1986)
- Pascal Dusapin (born 1955)
- Henri Dutilleux (1916–2013)
- Hugues Dufourt (born 1943)
- Jean-Baptiste Duvernoy (c. 1802 – c. 1880)

== E–G ==
Gabriel Fauré

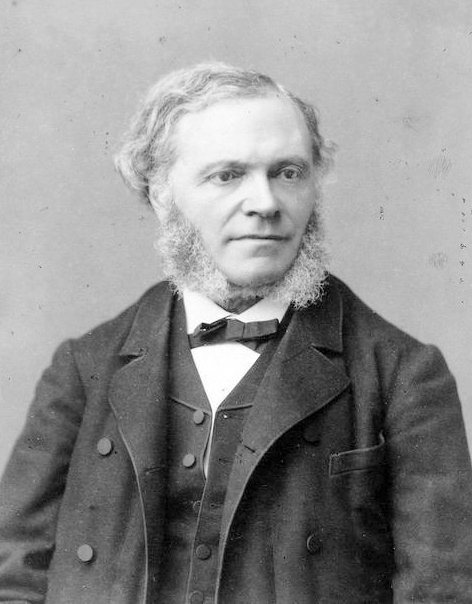
César Franck

- Ebran (c. 1543 – c. 1564)
- André-Joseph Exaudet (1710–1762)
- Ernest Fanelli (1860–1917)
- Louise Farrenc (1804–1875)
- Gabriel Fauré (1845–1924)
- Antoine Favre (c. 1670–c. 1739)
- Antoine Forqueray (1671–1745)
- Jean Françaix (1912–1997)
- César Franck (1822–1890)
- Raymond Gallois-Montbrun (1918–1994)
- Jacques Gallot (c. 1625 – c. 1695)
- Pedro Garcia-Velasquez (born 1984)
- Denis Gaultier (1603–1672)
- André Gedalge (1856–1926)
- Henri Ghys (1839–1908)
- Godard (fl. 1536 – c. 1560)
- Benjamin Godard (1849–1895)
- Nicolas Gombert (c. 1495 – c. 1560)
- François Joseph Gossec (1734–1829)
- Charles Gounod (1818–1893)
- Théodore Gouvy (1819–1898)
- Jacques de Gouy (c.1610 – after 1650)
- Nicolas de Grigny (1672–1703)
- Gérard Grisey (1946–1998)
- Gabriel Grovlez (1879–1944)
- Louis-Gabriel Guillemain (1705–1770)
- Guillon (fl. 1776 – c. 1787)
- Jean Guillou (1930–2019)
- Alexandre Guilmant (1837–1911)

== H–K ==
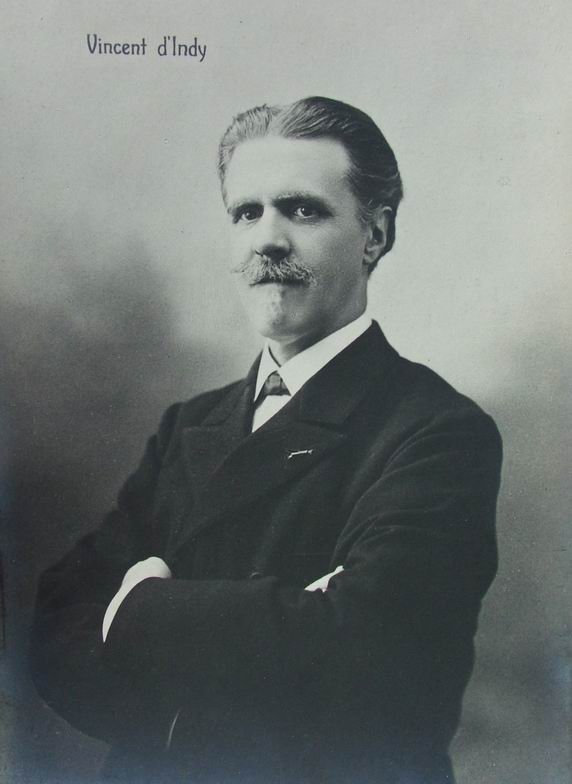
Vincent d'Indy

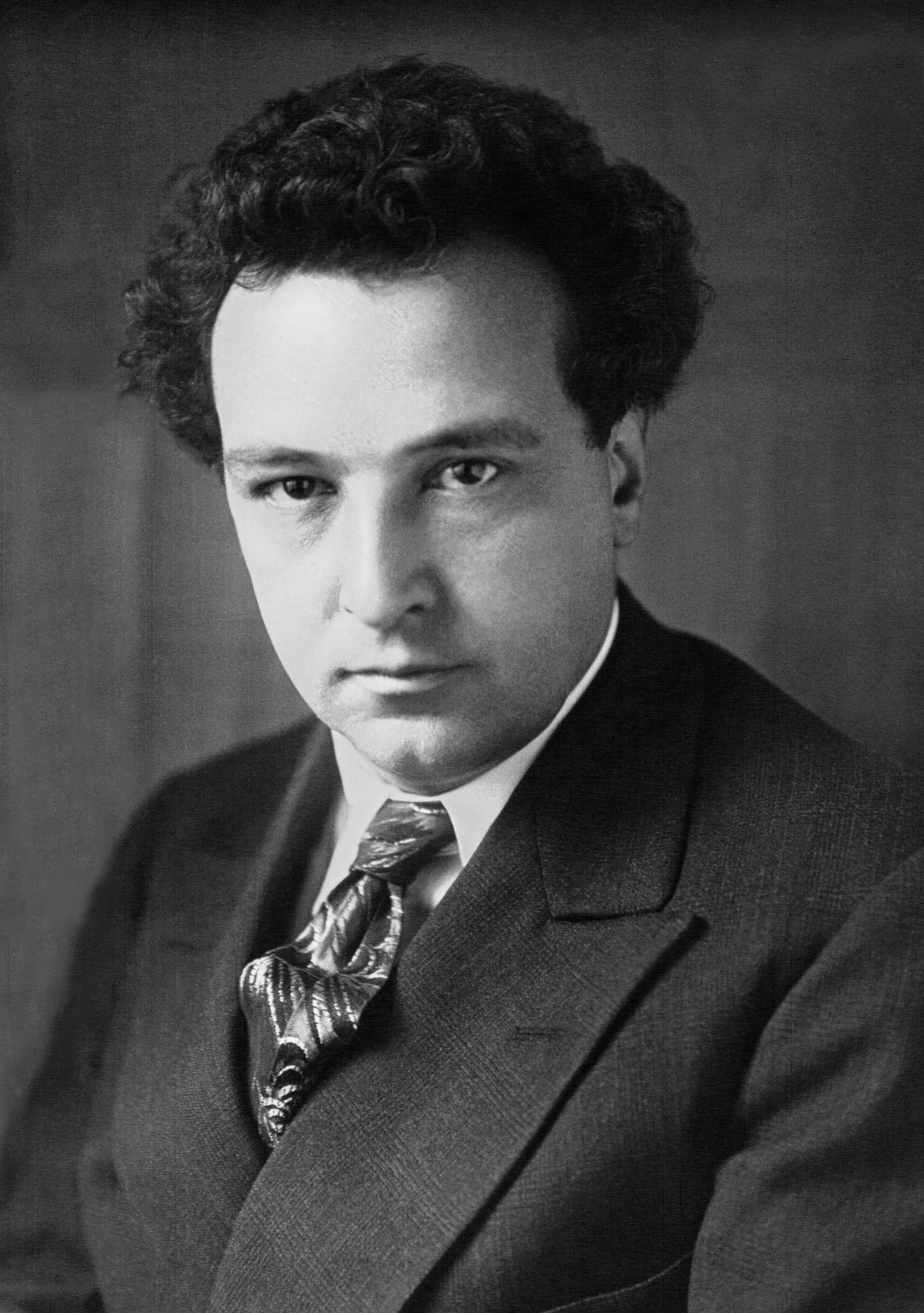
Arthur Honegger

- Reynaldo Hahn (1874–1947)
- Fromental Halévy (1799–1862)
- Charles-Louis Hanon (1819–1900)
- Guy d'Hardelot (1858–1936)
- Lucien Haudebert (1877–1963)
- Pierre Henry (1927–2017)
- Ferdinand Hérold (1791–1833)
- Louis de Caix d'Hervelois (c. 1670 – c. 1760)
- Augusta Holmès (1847–1903)
- Arthur Honegger (1892–1955)
- Jacques-Martin Hotteterre (1674–1763)
- Jean Huré (1877–1930)
- Jacques Ibert (1890–1962)
- Vincent d'Indy (1851–1931)
- H. Maurice Jacquet (1886–1954)
- Hyacinthe Jadin (1776–1800)
- Louis-Emmanuel Jadin (1768–1853)
- Clément Janequin (c. 1485 – 1558)
- Jean Michel Jarre (born 1948)
- Maurice Jarre (1924–2009)
- André Jolivet (1905–1974)
- Maurice Journeau (1898–1999)
- Louis Antoine Jullien (1812–1860)
- Cyprien Katsaris (born 1951)
- Eugène Ketterer (1831–1870)
- Charles Koechlin (1867–1950)
- Joseph-François Kremer (born 1954)
- Léon Charles François Kreutzer (1817–1868)
- Rodolphe Kreutzer (1766–1831)

== L ==
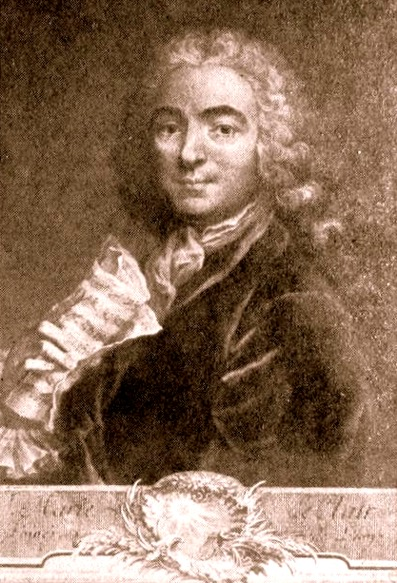
Jean-Marie Leclair

- Élisabeth Jacquet de La Guerre (1665–1729)
- Sophie Lacaze (born 1963)
- Théodore Lack (1846–1921)
- Louis Lacombe (1818–1884)
- Antoine Lacroix (1756–1806)
- Paul Ladmirault (1877–1944)
- Édouard Lalo (1823–1892)
- Michel Lambert (1610–1696)
- Georges Lamothe (1842–1894)
- Jean Langlais (1907–1991)
- Marcel Lanquetuit (1894–1985)
- Christian Lauba (born 1952)
- Jean-François Le Sueur (1760–1837)
- Nicolas Lebègue (c. 1631 – 1702), also "Le Bègue"
- Jean-Marie Leclair (1697–1764)
- Jean-Marie Leclair the younger (1703–1777)
- Louis James Alfred Lefébure-Wély (1817–1869)
- Paul Le Flem (1881–1984)
- Michel Legrand (1932–2019)
- Jean-Pierre Leguay (born 1939)
- Jacques Leguerney (1906–1997)
- Jean-Baptiste Lemire (1867–1945)
- Léonin (1150s – c. 1201)
- Fabien Lévy (born 1968)
- Gaston Litaize (1909–1991)
- Jean-Baptiste Lully (1632–1687)

== M–N ==
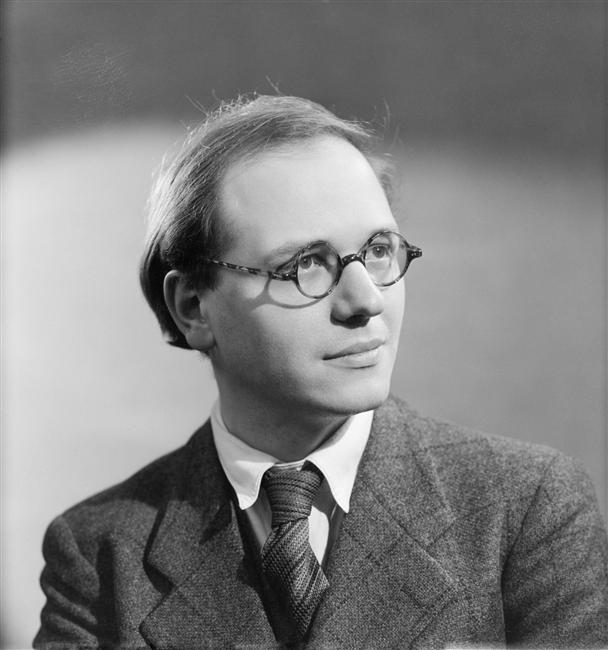
Olivier Messiaen

Jean-Joseph de Mondonville

- Guillaume de Machaut (c. 1300 – 1377)
- Albéric Magnard (1865–1914)
- Jean-Yves Malmasson (born 1963)
- Pierre de Manchicourt (c. 1510 – 1564)
- Marin Marais (1656–1728)
- Louis Marchand (1669–1732)
- Victor Massé (1822–1884)
- Jules Massenet (1842–1912)
- Paule Maurice (1910–1967)
- Jacques Féréol Mazas (1782–1849)
- Jules Mazellier (1879–1959)
- Stephane Meer (born 1951)
- Étienne Méhul (1763–1817)
- Félicien Menu de Ménil (1860–1930)
- Max Méreaux (born 1946)
- Olivier Messiaen (1908–1992)
- Jean-Christian Michel (born 1938)
- Darius Milhaud (1892–1974)
- Jean-Joseph de Mondonville (1711–1772)
- Jacques-Louis Monod (1927–2020)
- Michel Pignolet de Montéclair (1667–1737)
- Léon Moreau (1870–1946)
- Pierre Montan Berton (1727–1780)
- Étienne Moulinié (1599–1667)
- Jean-Joseph Mouret (1682–1738)
- Jean Mouton (c. 1459 – 1522)
- Tristan Murail (born 1947)
- François Joseph Naderman (1781–1835)

== O–P ==
- Jacques Offenbach (1819–1880)
- Joseph O'Kelly (1828–1885)
- André George Louis Onslow (1784–1853)
- Étienne Ozi (1754–1813)
- Émile Paladilhe (1844–1926)
- Paul Paray (1886–1979)
- Pérotin (c. 1160 – c. 1230)
- Claude Perraudin (1948 – 2001)
- Jean-Louis Petit (born 1937)
- Ninot le Petit (fl. c. 1500–1520)
- Georges Pfeiffer (1835–1908)
- François-André Danican Philidor (1726–1795)
- Gabriel Pierné (1863–1937)
- Auguste Pilati (1810–1877)
- Francis Poulenc (1899–1963)
- Jacques de la Presle (1888–1969)
- Josquin des Prez (c. 1450 – 1521)
- Pierre Pincemaille (1956–2018)

== R–S ==
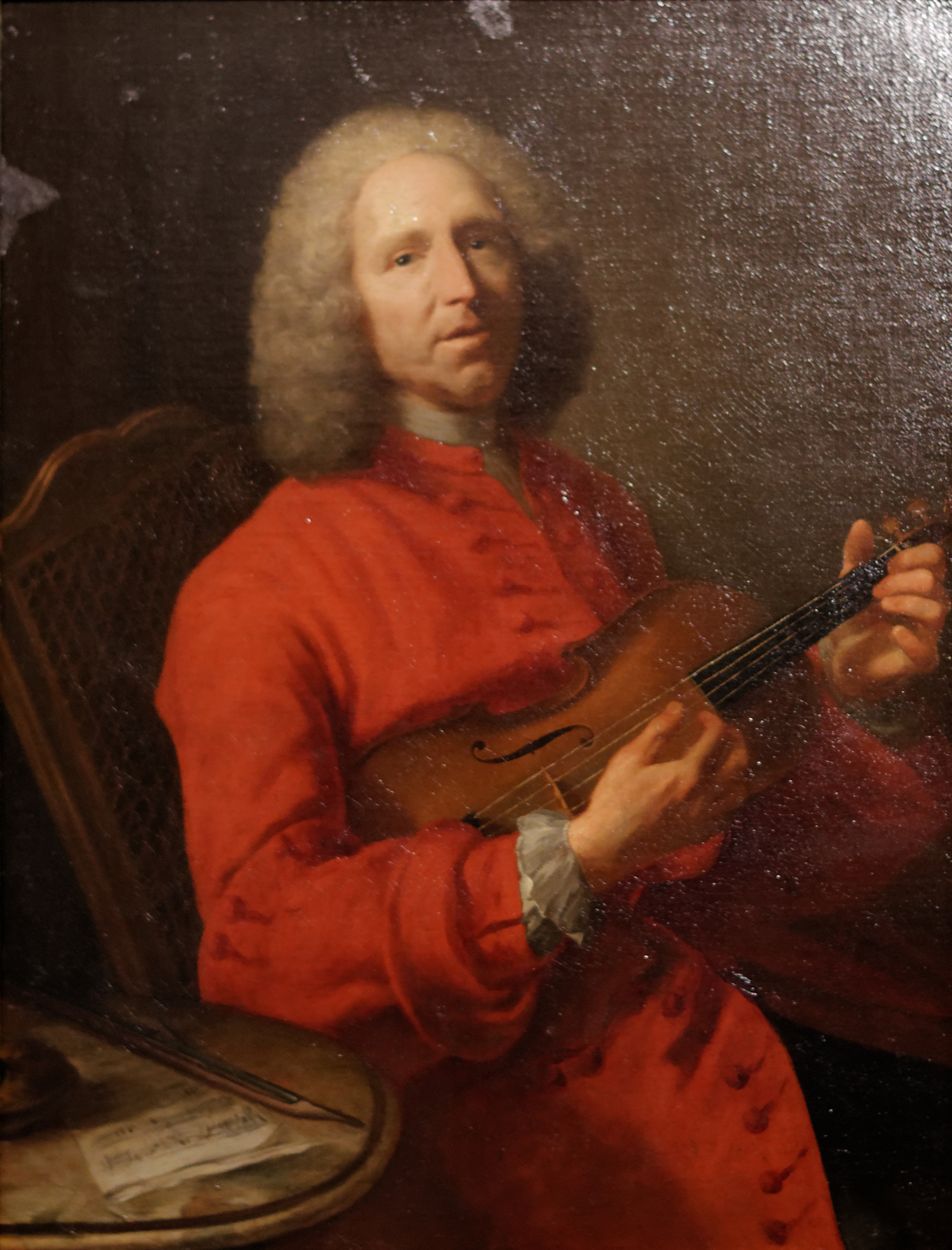
Jean-Philippe Rameau

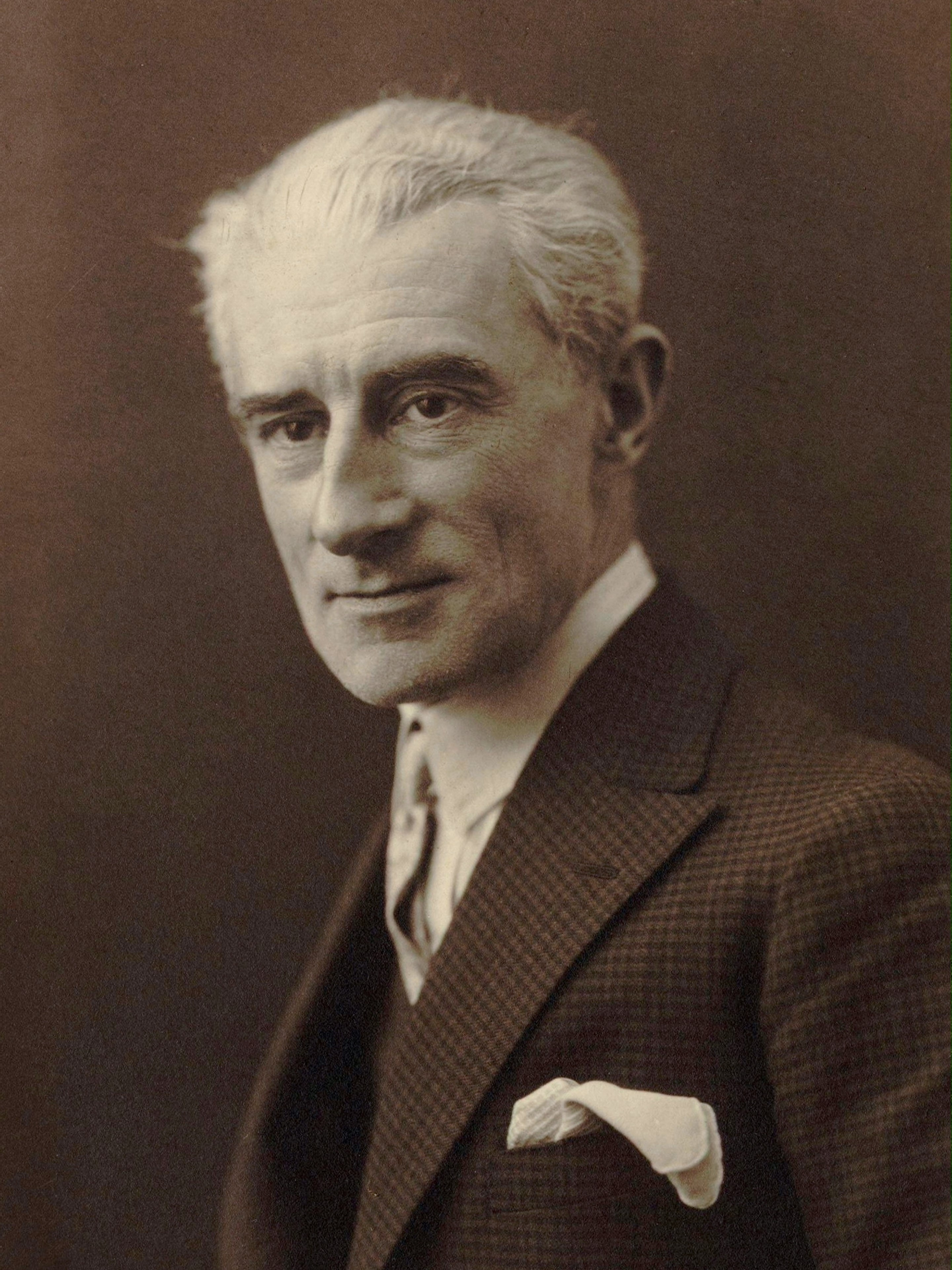
Maurice Ravel

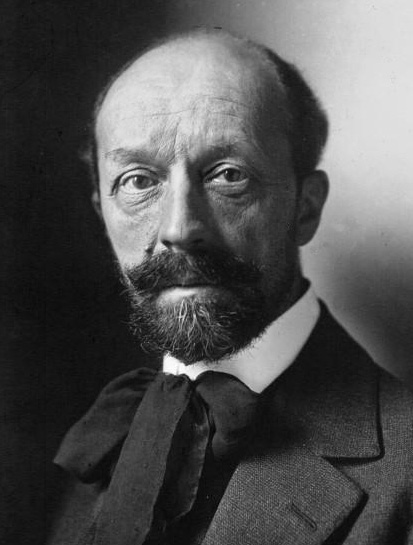
Albert Roussel

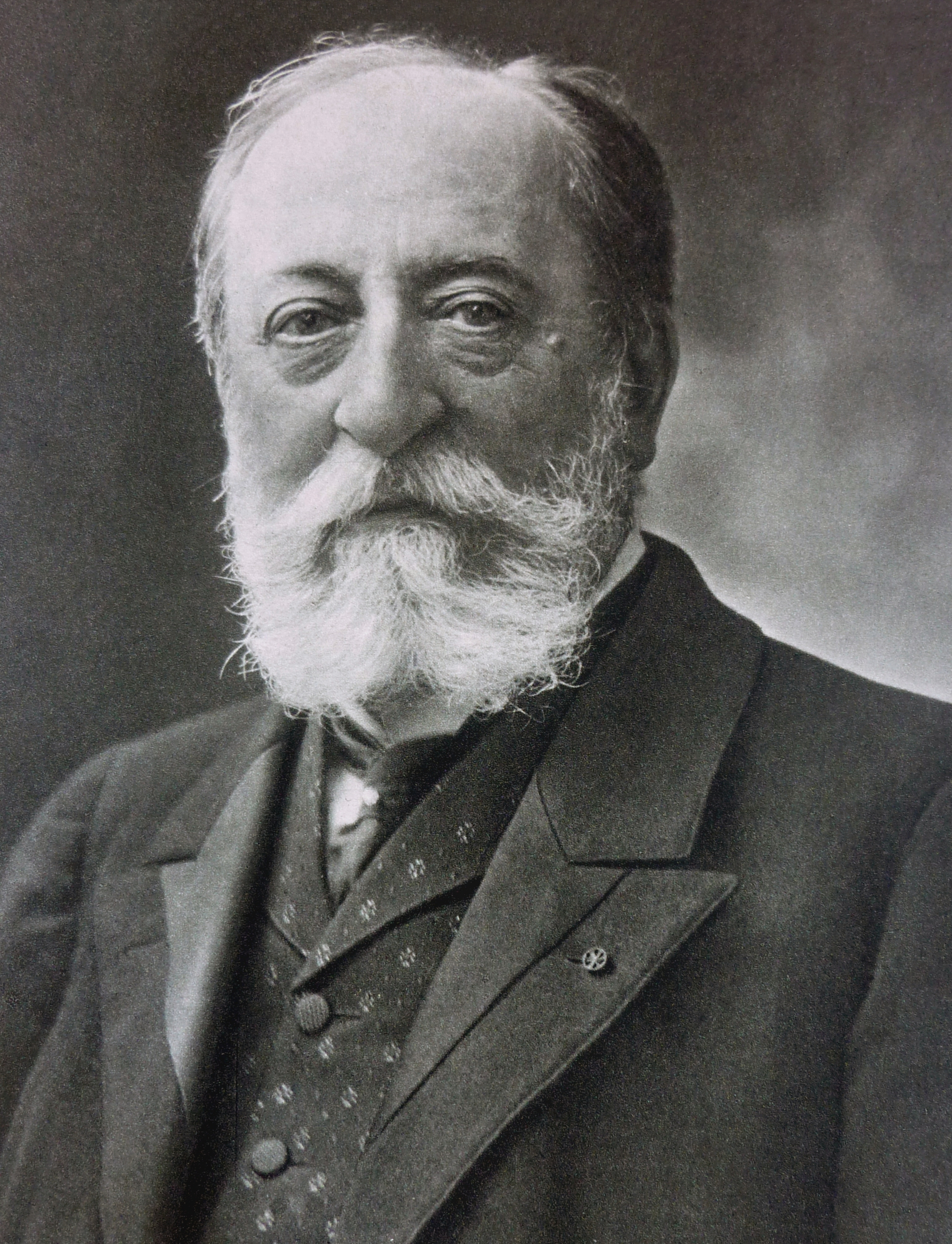
Camille Saint-Saëns

- Jean-Philippe Rameau (1683–1764)
- Jean-Marie Raoul (1766–1837)
- Maurice Ravel (1875–1937)
- Jean-Henri Ravina (1818–1906)
- Jean-Féry Rebel (1666–1747)
- Rhené-Baton (1879–1940)
- Jean-Claude Risset (1938–2016)
- Théodore Ritter (1840–1887)
- Pierre Rode (1774–1830)
- Joseph Guy Ropartz (1864–1955)
- Claude Joseph Rouget de Lisle (1760–1836)
- Jean-Jacques Rousseau (1712–1778)
- Albert Roussel (1869–1937)
- Joseph-Nicolas-Pancrace Royer (c. 1705 – 1755)
- F. Rubinet (fl 1482–1507)
- Pierre de La Rue (c. 1452 – 1518)
- Monsieur de Sainte-Colombe (c. 1640 – c. 1700)
- Camille Saint-Saëns (1835–1921)
- Gustave Samazeuilh (1877–1967)
- Pierre Sancan (1916–2008)
- Erik Satie (1866–1925)
- Henri Sauguet (1901–1989)
- Alice Sauvrezis (1866–1946)
- Charles Eugène Sauzay (1809–1901)
- Pierre Schaeffer (1910–1995)
- Florent Schmitt (1870–1958)
- Claudin de Sermisy (c. 1490 – 1562)
- Gaston Serpette (1846–1904)
- Éric Serra (born 1959)
- Déodat de Séverac (1872–1921)

== T–Y ==
- Walter Taieb (born 1973)
- Germaine Tailleferre (1892–1983)
- Alexandre Tansman (1897–1986)
- Claude Terrasse (1867–1923)
- Ambroise Thomas (1811–1896)
- Charles Tournemire (1870–1939)
- Edgard Varèse (1883–1965)
- Gilet Velut (flourished in early 15th century)
- Pauline Viardot (1821–1910)
- Louis Vierne (1870–1937)
- Robert de Visée (c. 1655 – 1732–33)
- Louis Vuillemin (1879–1929)
- Charles-Marie Widor (1844–1937)
- Jules Auguste Wiernsberger (1857–1925)
- Michèl Yost (1754–1786)

== See also ==
- List of French classical composers (chronological)
- Lists of composers
