= Chronological list of French classical composers =

The following is a chronological list of classical music composers who lived in, worked in, or were citizens of France.

== Medieval ==
- Leonin (c. 1150 – 1201)
- Perotin (1160 – 1230)
- Adam de la Halle (1240 – 1287)
- Philippe de Vitry (1291 – 1361)
- Guillaume de Machaut (c. 1300 – 1377)

== Renaissance ==
- Guillaume Dufay (c. 1397 – 1474)
- Gilles Binchois (c. 1400 – 1460)
- Loÿset Compère (c. 1445 – 1518)
- Josquin des Prez (c. 1450 – 1521), born near Franco-Flemish border
- Pierre de La Rue (c. 1452 – 1518)
- Jean Mouton (c. 1459 – 1522)
- Antoine Brumel (c. 1460 – 1512/1513)
- Clément Janequin (c. 1485 – 1558)
- Claudin de Sermisy (c. 1490 – 1562)
- Nicolas Gombert (c. 1495 – c. 1560)
- Ninot le Petit (fl. c. 1500 – 1520)
- Pierre de Manchicourt (c. 1510 – 1564)
- Godard (fl. 1536 – c. 1560)
- Claude Gervaise (fl. 1540 – 1560)
- Jean Titelouze (c. 1562/63 – 1633)

== Baroque ==
- Pierre Guédron (c. 1570 – c. 1620)
- Ennemond Gaultier (c. 1575–1651)
- Antoine Boësset (1586–1643)
- Étienne Moulinié (c. 1599 – after 1669)
- Jacques Gaultier (c. 1600-1652)
- Jacques Champion de Chambonnières (c. 1601 – 1672)
- Denis Gaultier (1603–1672)
- François Dufault (before 1604 – c. 1672)
- Jacques de Gouy (c. 1610 – after 1650)
- Michel Lambert (1610–1696)
- Charles Mouton (1617 - before 1699)
- Louis Couperin (c. 1626 – 1661)
- Jean-Henri d'Anglebert (1629–1691)
- Jean-Baptiste Lully (1632–1687)
- Monsieur de Sainte-Colombe (c. 1640 – c. 1700)
- Marc-Antoine Charpentier (1643–1704)
- Robert de Visée (c. 1655 – 1732/1733)
- Marin Marais (1656–1728)
- Michel Richard Delalande (1657–1726)
- André Campra (1660–1744)
- Élisabeth Jacquet de La Guerre (1665–1729)
- Jean-Féry Rebel (1666–1747)
- Michel Pignolet de Montéclair (1667–1737)
- François Couperin (1668–1733)
- Louis Marchand (1669–1732)
- Louis de Caix d'Hervelois (c. 1670 – c. 1760)
- Antoine Favre (c. 1670–c. 1739)
- Gaspard Corrette (1671–before 1733)
- Antoine Forqueray (1671–1745)
- Nicolas de Grigny (1672–1703)
- Jacques-Martin Hotteterre (1674–1763)
- Louis-Nicolas Clérambault (1676–1749)
- Jean-François Dandrieu (c. 1682 – 1738)
- Jean-Joseph Mouret (1682–1738)
- Jean-Philippe Rameau (1683–1764)
- François d'Agincourt (1684–1758)
- Joseph Bodin de Boismortier (1689–1755)
- Louis-Claude Daquin (1694–1772)
- Jean-Marie Leclair the elder (1697–1764)
- François Francoeur (1698–1787)
- Michel Blavet (1700–1768)
- Christophe Moyreau (1700–1774)
- Jean-Marie Leclair the Younger (1703–1777)
- Joseph-Nicolas-Pancrace Royer (c. 1705 – 1755)
- Louis-Gabriel Guillemain (1705–1770)
- Michel Corrette (1707–1795)
- Jean-Joseph de Mondonville (1711–1772)

== Classical era ==
- Jacques Duphly (1715–1789)
- François-André Danican Philidor (1726–1795)
- Joseph Touchemoulin (1727–1801)
- François Joseph Gossec (1734–1829)
- André Grétry (1741–1813)
- Simon Le Duc (1742–1777)
- Chevalier de Saint-Georges (1745–1799)
- Nicolas Dalayrac (1753–1809)
- Jean-Baptiste Bréval (1753–1823)
- Antoine Lacroix (1756–1806)
- Ignaz Pleyel (1757–1831)
- Jean-François Lesueur (1760–1837)
- Olivier Aubert (1763–c.1830)
- Étienne Méhul (1763–1817)
- Rodolphe Kreutzer (1766–1831)
- Louis-Emmanuel Jadin (1768–1853)
- Charles Simon Catel (1773–1830)
- Pierre Rode (1774–1830)
- François-Adrien Boieldieu (1775–1834)
- Hyacinthe Jadin (1776–1800)
- Pauline Duchambge (1778–1858)
- Jacques Féréol Mazas (1782–1849)

== Romantic ==
- Daniel Auber (1782–1871)
- George Onslow (1784–1853)
- Nicolas-Charles Bochsa (1789–1856)
- Ferdinand Hérold (1791–1833)
- Fromental Halévy (1799–1862)
- Amédée Méreaux (1802–1874)
- Victor Magnien (1802–1885)
- Adolphe Adam (1803–1856)
- Hector Berlioz (1803–1869)
- Louise Farrenc (1804–1875)
- Louise Bertin (1805–1877)
- Napoléon Coste (1805–1883)
- Napoléon Henri Reber (1807–1880)
- Auguste Pilati (1810–1877)
- Félicien David (1810–1876)
- Ambroise Thomas (1811–1896)
- Charles-Valentin Alkan (1813–1888)
- Eugène Louis-Marie Jancourt (1815–1901)
- Jean-Chrisostome Hess (1816–1900)
- François Bazin (1816–1878)
- Ignace Leybach (1817–1891)
- Émile Prudent (1817–1863)
- Louis James Alfred Lefébure-Wély (1817–1869)
- Charles Dancla (1817–1907)
- Jean-Henri Ravina (1818–1906)
- Charles Gounod (1818–1893)
- Jacques Offenbach (1819–1880)
- Charles-Louis Hanon (1819–1900)
- Pauline Viardot (1821–1910)
- César Franck (1822–1890)
- Édouard Lalo (1823–1892)
- Joseph Jean-Baptiste Laurent Arban (1825–1889)
- Charles Delioux (1825–1915)
- Joseph O'Kelly (1828–1885)
- Georges Pfeiffer (1835–1908)
- Camille Saint-Saëns (1835–1921)
- Léo Delibes (1836–1891)
- Alexandre Guilmant (1837–1911)
- Théodore Dubois (1837–1924)
- Georges Bizet (1838–1875)
- Élie-Miriam Delaborde (1839–1913)
- Henri Ghys (1839–1908)
- Emmanuel Chabrier (1841–1894)
- Georges Lamothe (1842–1894)
- Jules Massenet (1842–1912)
- Claude-Paul Taffanel (1844–1908)
- Charles-Marie Widor (1844–1937)
- Gabriel Fauré (1845–1924)
- Marie Jaëll (1846–1925)
- Henri Duparc (1848–1933)
- Benjamin Godard (1849–1895)
- Clément Broutin (1851–1889)
- Vincent d'Indy (1851–1931)
- André Messager (1853–1929)
- Ernest Chausson (1855–1899)
- Alfred Bruneau (1857–1934)
- Cécile Chaminade (1857–1944)
- Jules Auguste Wiernsberger (1857–1925)
- Mélanie Bonis (1858–1937)
- Gustave Charpentier (1860–1956)

== Modern/contemporary ==
- Claude Debussy (1862–1918)
- Maurice Emmanuel (1862–1938)
- Isidor Philipp (1863–1958)
- Gabriel Pierné (1863–1937)
- Guy Ropartz (1864–1955)
- Rita Strohl (1865–1941)
- Paul Dukas (1865–1935)
- Albéric Magnard (1865–1914)
- Erik Satie (1866–1925)
- Charles Koechlin (1867–1950)
- Jules Mouquet (1867–1946)
- Halina Krzyżanowska (1867–1937)
- Abel Decaux (1869–1943)
- Albert Roussel (1869–1937)
- Francis Casadesus (1870–1954)
- Louis Vierne (1870–1937)
- Charles Tournemire (1870–1939)
- Florent Schmitt (1870–1958)
- Henri Büsser (1872–1973)
- Déodat de Séverac (1872–1921)
- Jean Roger-Ducasse (1873–1954)
- Reynaldo Hahn (1874–1947)
- Maurice Ravel (1875–1937)
- Henriette Renié (1875–1956)
- Armande de Polignac (1876–1962)
- Jean Huré (1877–1930)
- Louis Aubert (1877–1968)
- Robert-Guillaume Casadesus (1878–1940)
- Lucien Durosoir (1878–1955)
- Gabriel Dupont (1878–1914)
- André Caplet (1878–1925)
- Henri Casadesus (1879–1947)
- Jean Cras (1879–1932)
- Philippe Gaubert (1879–1941)
- Maurice Delage (1879–1961)
- Marcel Tournier (1879–1951)
- Joseph Canteloube (1879–1957)
- Paul Le Flem (1881–1984)
- Edgard Varèse (1883–1965)
- Henri Collet (1885–1951)
- Marcel Dupré (1886–1971)
- Nadia Boulanger (1887–1979)
- Louis Durey (1888–1979)
- Jacques Ibert (1890–1962)
- Marcel Grandjany (1891–1975)
- Marius Casadesus (1892–1981)
- Darius Milhaud (1892–1974)
- Germaine Tailleferre (1892–1983)
- Lili Boulanger (1893–1918)
- Marcel Lanquetuit (1894–1985)
- Jean Wiener (1896–1982)
- Jean Rivier (1896–1987)
- Robert Casadesus (1899–1972)
- Francis Poulenc (1899–1963)
- Georges Auric (1899–1983)
- Pierre-Octave Ferroud (1900–1936)
- Henri Sauguet (1901–1989)
- Henri Tomasi (1901–1971)
- Catherine Casadesus (1902–1985)
- Maurice Duruflé (1902–1986)
- Claude Arrieu (1903–1990)
- Manuel Rosenthal (1904–2003)
- Eugene Bozza (1905–1991)
- André Jolivet (1905–1974)
- Jean Langlais (1907–1991)
- Olivier Messiaen (1908–1992)
- Jean-Yves Daniel-Lesur (1908–2002)
- Pierre Schaeffer (1910–1995)
- Jean Martinon (1910–1976)
- Paule Maurice (1910–1967)
- Jehan Alain (1911–1940)
- Alfred Desenclos (1912–1971)
- Jean Françaix (1912–1997)
- Maurice Ohana (1913–1992)
- Henri Dutilleux (1916–2013)
- Michel Philippot (1925–1996)
- Pierre Boulez (1925–2016)
- Betsy Jolas (born 1926)
- Pierre Henry (1927–2017)
- Bernard Parmegiani (1927–2013)
- Jean-Michel Damase (1928–2013)
- François Dufrene (1930–1982)
- Pierre Max Dubois (1930–1995)
- Claude Bolling (1930–2020)
- François Bayle (born 1932)
- Roger Boutry (1932–2019)
- Éliane Radigue (born 1932)
- Yves Prin (born 1933)
- Vinko Globokar (born 1934)
- Gilbert Amy (born 1936)
- Jean-Pierre Leguay (born 1939)
- Gérard Grisey (1946–1998)
- Tristan Murail (born 1947)
- Greco Casadesus (born 1951)
- Philippe Manoury (born 1952)
- Joël-François Durand (born 1954)
- Pascal Dusapin (born 1955)
- Pierre Pincemaille (1956–2018)
- Nicolas Bacri (born 1961)
- Marc-André Dalbavie (born 1961)
- Sophie Lacaze (born 1963)
- Thierry Escaich (born 1965)
- Yann Tiersen (born 1970)
- Christophe Bertrand (1981–2010)

== See also ==
- List of classical music composers by era
- List of French composers
- Classic 100 Music of France (ABC)
