= Guillon =

Guillon may refer to:

- Guillon, Yonne, a commune in Yonne, Burgundy, France
- Guillon (distillery), malt spirit distillery in Louvois, Marne, France
- Guillon (surname)
