= Antoine Faure =

Antoine Faure may refer to:

- Antoine Faure (composer) (c. 1670–c. 1739), French composer and violinist
- Antoine Fauré (1883–1954), French road bicycle racer
