= Perraudin =

Perraudin is a surname. Notable people with the surname include:

- André Perraudin (1914–2003), Swiss Catholic clergyman
- Claude Perraudin (1948–2001), French composer, guitarist and conductor
- William Perraudin (fl. 1977), British economist
