= Guillon (surname) =

Guillon is a French surname. Notable people with the surname include:

- Guillon (composer) (fl. 1776 – c. 1787), French composer, military officer, violinist, and bassoonist
- Arnaud Guillon (born 1964), French writer
- Damien Guillon (born 1981), French countertenor
- Joel Guillon, French Paralympic shooter
- Olivier Guillon, French-German scientist
- Roland Guillon (born 1942), French sociologist
