= Pauline Duchambge =

French pianist, singer, and composer

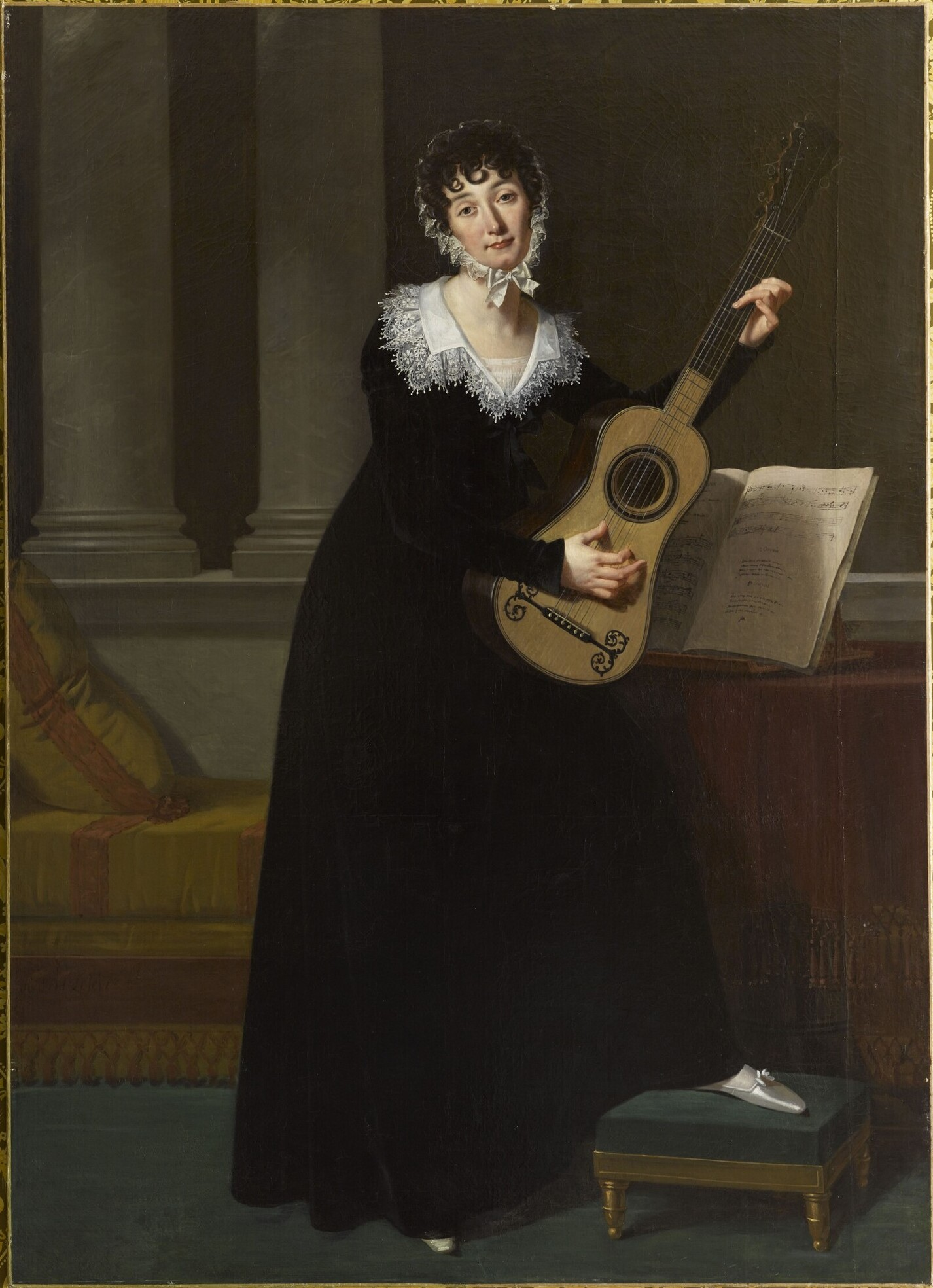
Duchambge playing the guitar, in a portrait by Robert Lefèvre

Pauline Duchambge née de Montet (1778 – 23 April 1858) was a French pianist, singer, and composer.

== Life ==
Duchambge (Montet) was born in Martinique, the daughter of a noble family. She was taken to Paris, where she received a convent education and studied the piano from composer and author Jean-Baptiste Desormery, son of the famous comic opera actor and composer Léopold-Bastien Desormery. Pauline left the convent in 1792 and married Baron Duchambge in 1796. In 1798 at the age of 20, she lost both her parents and with them the family fortune. Soon afterwards she was divorced.

It was after these events that Duchambge's musical education began in earnest. She studied harmony and composition with Daniel Auber and Luigi Cherubini (who wrote several compositions for her) as well as piano and composition with Jan Ladislav Dussek.

In 1815, Duchambge met the French poet and novelist, Marceline Desbordes-Valmore beginning a lifelong friendship and collaboration. Their friendship is documented by a lengthy correspondence and a number of songs by Duchambge on Debordes-Valmore's texts including L'Adieu tout bas, La Fiancée del marin, Je pense à lui, La Jeune Châtelaine, Rêve du mousse, La Sincère, and La Valse et l'automne. Duchambge also composed music to texts and romances of other female authors such as Mme Amble Tastu and Mme Emile De Girardin. Pauline Duchambge wrote over three hundred romances, a very popular genre in the nineteenth century. Auber deposited three hundred of Duchambge's songs in the library of the Paris Conservatoire. Eleven of Duchambge's individual songs and albums of songs were published between 1827 and 1841 by some of the leading Parisian publishers including Meissonnier, Jacques-Joseph Frey, A. Petibon, and Pleyel. Her works reached a German audience through the Berlin publisher Maurice Schlesinger and the Schott firm in Mainz. In addition to songs, Duchambge wrote a few piano pieces.

Duchambge had a difficult life, struggling with poverty, delicate health, and the disenchantments of love; her music expresses her emotions. She commented: "Love, it is life! but a life full of troubles, illusions, deceptions, repentance, discouragements…. "

== Musical style ==
Some of Duchambge's songs have been published in the twentieth century in Les Greniers et la guitare de Marceline (1931) and in an anthology of songs (1988). Duchambge's romances were very popular during the first years of the Restoration. She was admired by many poets of her day, setting poems of the leading Romantics including François-René Chateaubriand and Victor Hugo, and dramatists Casimir Delavigne, Alfred de Vigny, and Eugène Scribe. She also set texts by women such as Mme. Amable Tastu and Mme. Émile de Girardin.

Duchambge chose texts that were often pastoral and expressed love sentiments typical of the early-nineteenth century. The music is strophic and usually without refrains. The simple diatonic melodies have a range of a ninth. Her melodies are often ornamented with grace notes and some accents, and there are a few dynamic markings. Duchambge was sensitive to the words and reflects different moods within a verse. According to Fétis, the lyric melodies are remarkable for "a sweet sensibility and elegance of form."

The harmony has an interesting variety of chords, containing modulations and secondary dominants. Duchambge uses major and minor modes in the same song to reflect changing moods. The piano accompaniments use ostinatos, arpeggios, and solid chords. The voice may begin in the first measure, or an introduction may set the mood of the song and establish the tonality. The final four measures of the accompaniment often serve as an interlude to the next verse as well as a coda to the final verse.

=== Detailed aspects ===
The poem La Jalouse (The Jealous One) was first published in Desbordes-Valmore's collection Papillon (1834) under the title La Fuite (The Escape), also in Pauvres Fleurs (1839). The poem has three stanzas of "huitains" (eight lines). The rhyme scheme of the stanzas is ABAB CDCD. The agitated introduction in C minor, with sixteenth-note triplets, establishes the mood. In the first phrase (bars 5–12), setting a sad, somber text, the melody begins in a narrow range, harmonised with a C minor broken chord. The melody glides up the scale on "glissant," and the phrase ends in E flat major. In verse three, these ascending notes triumphantly proclaim "I am the ungrateful one!" In the following unstable section (bars 13–18) in the minor dominant, the melody leaps up and down large intervals, portraying bouncing footsteps (verse 1) and turmoil (verse 2). The melody moves up a seventh to F, harmonised with a dominant-seventh chord, as the text commands "Ne fuis pas encore" (Do not flee yet). The melody descends, as the words say there is more to be told. One ("I am the ungrateful") is repeated in an Andantino section (bars 18–23), set triumphantly in C major with a disjunct line and joyous triplets, leading to a C-minor interlude (bars 23–26) that sets the mood for the following verse. For verses 2 and 3, Duchambge makes slight adjustments in the rhythm to set the words appropriately.

Le Jardin de ma fenêtre (The Garden by my Window) describes a flower garden and hedgerow in April, and a sailor returning home. The poet, Desbordes-Valmore, loved flowers and decorated the balconies and windows of her apartments with flowers. The poem has four stanzas, huitains, and the rhyme scheme is ABAB CDCD. The first half of the poem (bars 1–16), beginning without introduction, is set simply with tonic and dominant chords in A flat major. The melody is mostly stepwise, setting a peaceful scene of nature in each verse: the flower garden by the window, the evening swallow returning, the lamp lit for the returning sailor. The middle section (bars 17–24) is unstable with complex harmonies, leading to a return to the tonic. The melodic line in bars 25–31 ascends by a fifth, then moves gradually to the tonic as the words describe unsteady plants, a trembling hedgerow (or heart), and a flickering flame. The final melodic line is disjunct, accompanied by a series of secondary dominants, before landing on the tonic. The text reflects on two plants that are separated (representing two people), questions the significance of the returning swallow, and describes the lamp and flowers set out as a beacon for the sailor. The final four bars, serving as an interlude to the following verse, are stable with dominant and tonic chords over a tonic pedal. A new rhythmic figure in sixteenth notes is introduced, giving the song a pleasant motion.

Adieu tout (Farewell All), another poem by Desbordes-Valmore, has three stanzas of quatrains in an ABBA rhyme scheme with a two-line refrain. Duchambge's setting begins with an agitated section in F minor with tonic, dominant, and diminished broken chords over a dominant pedal (bars 1–8). The melody descends stepwise through the minor scale, recalling the sweet memory of love, then leaps up an octave, proclaiming the separation. The three verses are set in F major, with complex harmonies using the submediant, secondary dominants, and diminished chords. The melodic line begins simply with an undulating major third, then ascends a sixth before descending in the D harmonic minor scale. The melody then rises stepwise to E as verses 2 and 3 speak of going to heaven, then descends to the tonic. The final four bars, leading back to the F minor opening, have scales in contrary motion and reaffirm the F-major tonic.

== Works ==
Selected works include:

- L'Ange gardien
- Le Matelot
- La Brigantine, ou le Départ
- Adieu donc mon pays! ou le Suisse au Régiment
- La Jalouse

Some of her works have been recorded and issued on CD, including:

- Songs of the Classical Age, audio CD, Label: Cedille
