= Jules Mazellier =

French composer and conductor (1879–1959)

Jules Mazellier (6 April 1879 – 6 February 1959) was a French composer and conductor.

Mazellier studied at the Conservatoire de Paris. In 1909 he won the Prix de Rome for his composition La Roussalka. He composed chamber music, works for piano, songs and various operas.

== Selected works ==
Opera

- La Roussalka, Légende russe in 1 act (1909); libretto by Eugène Adénis and Fernand Beissier
- Graziella, Poème romantique in 4 acts, 5 scenes (1910–1912); libretto by Henri Caïn and Raoul Gastambide; premiere 6 March 1913 in Rouen
- La villa Médicis, Comédie lyrique in 3 acts (1923); libretto by the composer
- Les Matines d'Amour (The Bells of Love), Fabliau-miracle en trois images (1927); libretto by Raoul Gastambide; premiere 16 December 1927 at the Théâtre National de L'Opéra

Orchestral

- Contemplation, Rêverie (1908)
- Circenses, Poème symphonique (1911)
- Impressions d'été, Suite (1911)

Concertante

- Scherzo, choral et variations sur un thème unique for piano and orchestra

Chamber music

- Divertissement Pastoral for flute and piano (1931)
- Prélude et Danse for bassoon and piano (1931)
- Poème Romantique for violin and piano (or orchestra) (1933)
- Rhapsodie Montagnarde for horn and piano (1933)
- Nocturne et Rondeau for viola and piano (1934)
- Fantaisie-Ballet for clarinet and piano (1936)
- Ballade for violin and piano
- Berceuse for violin and piano
- Chanson for cello and piano
- Contemplation for violin and piano
- Fileuse for cello and piano
- Légende dramatique for trumpet and piano
- 2 Pièces brèves for flute and piano
- 5 Pièces brèves for cello and piano

Piano

- Bercelonette (1946)
- Complainte pour Noël, Variations pastorales (1946)
- Nocturne (1946)

Vocal

- Le Livre Chantant, 10 Mélodies for voice and orchestra
- Prière de Saint-François d'Assise for voice, violin, cello and organ

Pedigogical

- 500 Dictées musicales à une, deux, trois et quatre voix in four volumes
