= Halina Krzyżanowska =

Polish-French pianist and composer

Halina Krzyżanowska (1860, in Paris – 1937, in Rennes) was a Polish-French pianist and composer.

== Life ==
She was born in Paris, in a large musical family, which originally came from Poland and was a part of the impoverished Polish nobility. Halina (also Helene) held by birth the title of a countess (Gräfin in Germany, hrabina in Poland). She was (by her fathers family) also a distant relative of Chopin, who died 11 years before her birth.

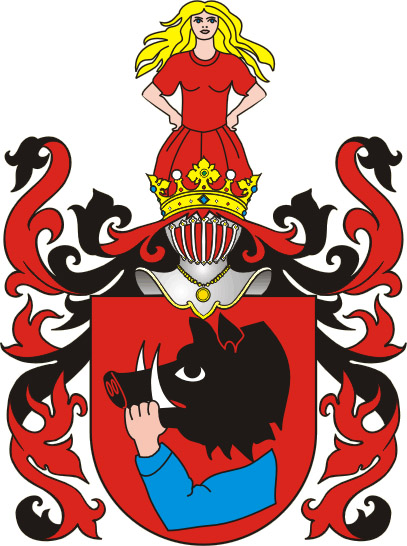
Coat of arms of Halina de Krzyżanowska's family

She studied at the Conservatoire de Paris with Antoine François Marmontel and Ernest Guiraud, and in 1880 she won the first prize at this prominent Conservatory.

She gave many concerts in various European countries and settled later in France as a professor at the conservatory in Rennes.

She was known as a very talented pianist and has made a name for herself also as a composer.

== Works ==
Krzyżanowska composed orchestral and chamber music, piano sonatas and character pieces for piano. Selected works include:

- Magdusia (1894) 1-act opera
- Fantasie piano concerto
- Sonata for cello and piano
