= Guillon (distillery) =

Malt spirit distillery in Louvois, Marne, France

- Location: Louvois
- Founded: 1997
- Founder: Thierry Guillon
- Website: https://www.distillerie-guillon.com

Guillon distillery is a French malt spirit distillery located in Louvois, Marne. It is one of the first distilleries to produce whiskies in France (the production started in 1997.). The malt spirits they produce are called "Guillon" or "L'Esprit du Malt de la Montagne de Reims" ("Montagne de Reims" being the regional nature reserve where it is produced). According to France Bleu's Sebastien Gitton it is considered "the best malt in France."

== Production process ==
Malt is produced in the Champagne region, 50 km from the distillery and transformed on site. The particularity of Guillon's spirits comes from both the use of a special yeast from the Champagne region and the duration of the fermentation step. Indeed, while the fermentation of most whiskies lasts only a few days, Guillon's fermentation lasts 4 weeks.

After that, it is distilled twice in copper alembics and then diluted using spring water. This water comes directly from the source close to the distillery.

The maturation process lasts between 5 and 10 years. Almost all spirits are finished in special casks that previously contained French wines

== Reputation ==
Guillon is sold to the following political institutions: Assemblée Nationale, Sénat., Palais de l'Élysée. Guillon is also served in renowned French restaurant as Les Crayères or L'Assiette Champenoise
