= F. Rubinet =

French composer and singer

F. Rubinet (fl 1482–1507), sometimes given as Robinet, was a French composer and singer active in Florence, Italy. Six compositions credited to F. Rubinet were copied in Florence in the 1490s and are extant in the collection at the National Central Library in Florence. Scholars speculate that this composer is the same person as a cantor, "Robinetto francioso cantore", employed at the Santissima Annunziata, Florence in 1482–1483, and a 'contro alto' "fratrem Rubinectum franciosum" employed at the Florence Cathedral in 1506–1507. His compositions appear to have been influenced by Loyset Compère, and use a similar 'cycle of fifths' utilized in Compère's compositions.

It is speculated by some, that F. Rubinet may be the composer of the ballad Entre Peronne et Saint Quentin ascribed to a Rubinus found in seven sources (two from central France) dating back to as early as 1460. However, other musicians have also been proposed as the author of this work.
