= Auguste Barbereau =

French composer and music theorist

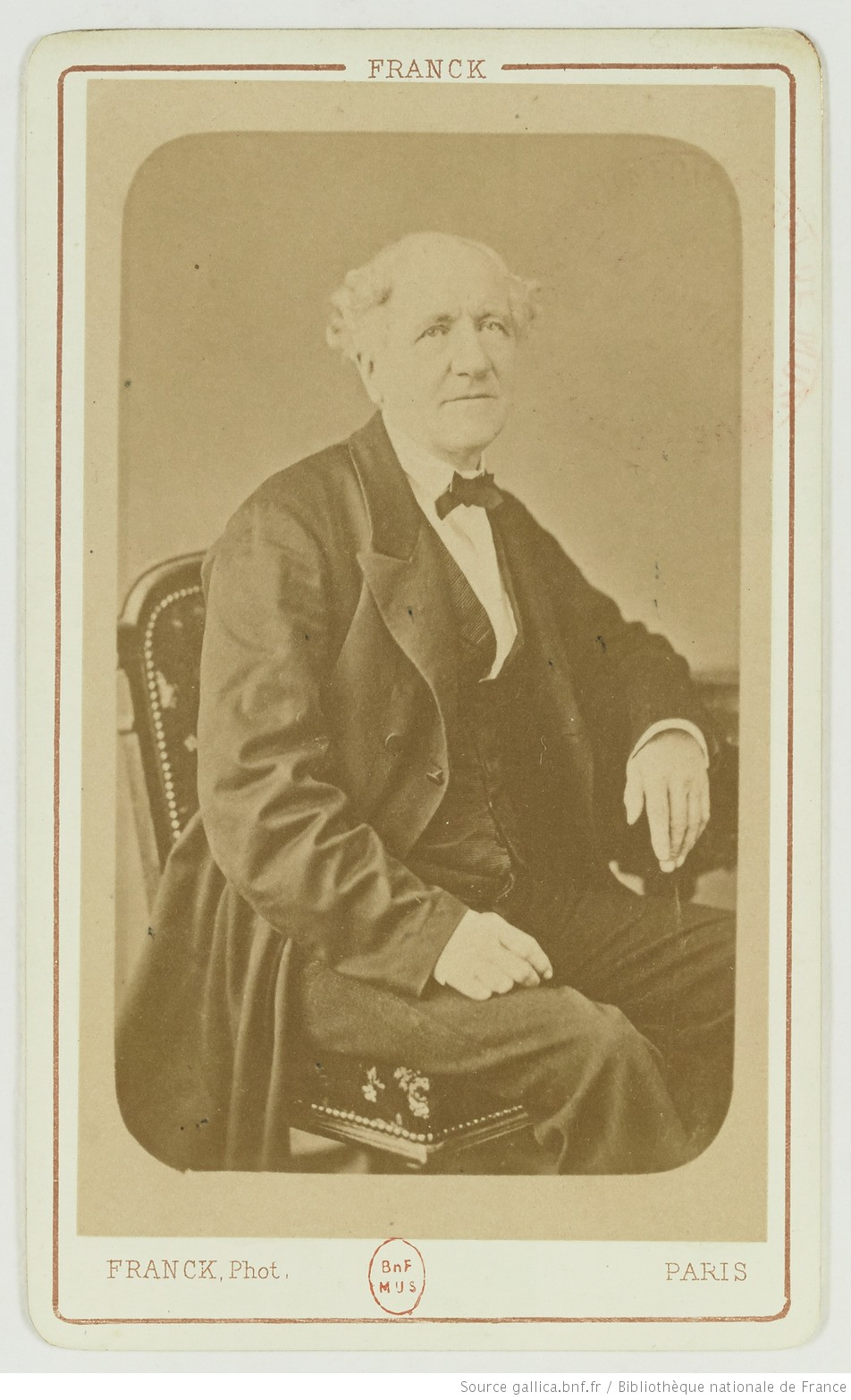

Mathurin Auguste Balthasar Barbereau (14 November 1799 – 14 July 1879) was a French composer and music theorist.

Barberau was born in Paris. He entered the Conservatoire de Paris in 1810 and received numerous prizes. He was awarded with the Prix de Rome in 1824 for his cantata Agnes Sorel with text by Pierre-Ange Vieillard. He conducted many orchestras in several theatres, especially the Théâtre Italien between 1836 and 1838.

Many times he replaced Anton Reicha, who had been his teacher in the class of composition of the Conservatory. Among his disciples are Ambroise Thomas, Ernest Guiraud, and Charles Delioux. He wrote the score of the opera Les Sybarites de Florence, and took part in a variety of symphonies and concert works. But the real contribution of Barbereau is his theoretical work, among them his Traité d'harmonie théoretique et pratique (1843–45), considered the most important scientific work published hitherto on this subject. After this work he published a curious Étude sur l'origine du système musical (Paris, 1852), which gave rise to great controversy.

Auguste Barbereau died suddenly in an omnibus in Paris, after he had been teaching at the Conservatory.
