= Alexis de Castillon =

French composer (1838 - 1873)

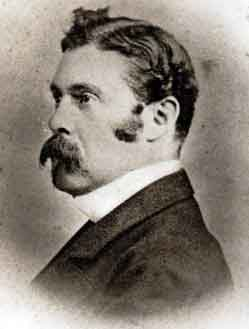
- Born: 13 December 1838
- Died: 5 March 1873 (aged 34)
- Education: Paris Conservatoire

Alexis-Marie de Castillon de Saint-Victor (13 December 1838 – 5 March 1873) was a French composer.

== Life and career ==
Castillon was born in Chartres into an old aristocratic family from Languedoc. His parents initially intended him to pursue a military career, but Castillon gave up plans for professional soldiering in favour of music, which he learned first in his birthplace and then in Paris, where he studied piano and composition, initially with Charles Delioux. For composition, he attended the classes of Victor Massé and, from 1869, of César Franck at the Paris Conservatoire. Before his studies with Franck, he had completed his Opus 1, a piano quintet, probably inspired by the earlier example of his friend Camille Saint-Saëns. Both the quintet and the later piano quartet Op. 7 follow Schumann's model. He disavowed earlier efforts, including a symphony in F major, which he had written in 1865.

In fragile health at the best of times (volunteering during the War of 1870, he fell ill and was demobilized in 1871), he died of complications from fever in 1873 at age 34. His works include pieces for piano, chamber music, mélodies, a piano concerto, and other orchestral music. He was also active in Parisian musical life, in particular helping to create, in 1871, the Société Nationale de Musique, of which he was the first secretary.

== List of compositions ==
=== Piano solo ===
- Fugue in G minor
- Fugues dans le style libre, Op. 2 (1869)
- Suite No. 1, Op. 5 (1867?-69)
  1. Canon
  2. Scherzo
  3. Thème et Variations
  4. Gavotte
  5. Marche
- 5 Pièces dans le style ancien, Op. 9 (1870)
  1. Prélude
  2. Sicilienne
  3. Sarabande
  4. Air (D major)
  5. Fughette
- Suite No. 2, Op. 10 (1870)
  1. Ballade
  2. Ronde
  3. Adagietto (F major)
  4. Fantaisie (D minor)
  5. Saltarelle
- 6 Valses humoristiques, Op. 11 (1871) (orchestrated by Charles Koechlin)
  1. (Liberamente) (E major)
  2. (Non troppo vivo) (A major)
  3. (Con fantasia) (C♯ minor)
  4. (Comodo) (F♯ major)
  5. (Energico) (B major)
  6. (Vivo assai) (E major)
- 24 Pensées fugitives (1873)
  1. Aveu
  2. Minuetto
  3. Au bois
  4. Carillon
  5. Compliment
  6. Première Mazurka
  7. Causerie
  8. Fanfare
  9. Scherzo-Valse
  10. Regrets
  11. Deuxième Mazurka
  12. Toccata
  13. . Marche des Français
  14. Au revoir
  15. Feu follet
  16. Bayadère
  17. Chanson du cavalier
  18. Extase
  19. Colombine
  20. Les Dragons
  21. Scherzettino
  22. Appel du soir
  23. Troisième Mazurka
  24. Aubade

=== Chamber ===
- Piano Quintet, Op. 1 (1863–64)
  1. Allegro
  2. Scherzo
  3. Adagio et final
- String Quartet No. 1, Op. 3, No. 1 (1867) (ded. to Henri Poencet)
  1. (Allegro)
  2. (Adagio molto lento – Allegro scherzando)
  3. (Molto grave – Molto allegro)
- String Quartet No. 2, Op. 3, No. 2 (1867) (unfinished, only Cavatina published)
- Piano Trio No. 1, Op. 4 (1865)
  1. Prélude et Andante
  2. Scherzo
  3. Romance
  4. Finale
- Sonata for violin and piano, Op. 6 (1868) (ded. to Elie-Miriam Delaborde)
  1. (Allegro moderato)
  2. (Allegro scherzando)
  3. (Andante)
  4. (Allegro molto)
- Piano Quartet, Op. 7 (1869) (ded. to Anton Rubinstein)
  1. (Larghetto – Allegro deciso – Allegro)
  2. (Scherzando)
  3. (Larghetto, quasi marcia religiosa)
  4. Finale (Allegro)
- Piano Trio No. 2, Op. 17 (1870-73?)
  1. (Allegro moderato)
  2. (Allegretto non vivo) (B♭ major)
  3. (Scherzando vivace) (G minor)
  4. (Adagio – Allegro con fuoco – Molto expressivo senza rigore)

=== Concertante ===
- Piano Concerto, Op. 12 (1871) (ded. to and first performed (in 1872) by Camille Saint-Saëns piano) (also arr. for 2 pianos by Vincent d'Indy)
  1. (Allegro moderato)
  2. (Molto lento)
  3. (Allegro con fuoco)

=== Orchestra ===
- Robert Schumann: Trois morceaux, arr. for orchestra (unpublished)
- Marche Scandinave (ded. to Georges Bizet) (unpublished)
- Symphony No. 1 (1865) (unpublished)
- 5 Airs de Danse, suite for orchestra (1870) (unpublished)
  1. Introduction et Ronde
  2. Tempo di Walzer
  3. Sicilienne
  4. Menuet
  5. Danse guerrière
- Esquisses symphoniques, Op. 15 (1872)
  1. Prélude
  2. Gavotte
  3. Allegretto
  4. Retour du Prélude et Finale
- Symphony No. 2 (1872) (unfinished)
- Franz Schubert: Impromptu, Op. 90, No. 1, arr. for orchestra (1872) (unpublished)
- 3 Pièces dans le style ancien (1873) (orchestration of Nos. 3, 4, and 5 of Op. 9) (unpublished)
  1. Sarabande
  2. Air
  3. Fughette
- Torquato Tasso, Ouverture (unfinished)

=== Songs ===
- 6 Poésies d'Armand Silvestre, Op. 8 (1868–73) (orchestrated 1920 by Charles Koechlin)
  1. Le Bûcher
  2. Le Semeur
  3. Sonnet mélancolique
  4. La Mer
  5. Renouveau
  6. Vendange

=== Choral ===
- Paraphrase du Psaume 84, for soloists, choir, and orchestra, on a text by Louis Gallet, Op. 16 (1872)
- Mass (1872) (unfinished)
