= Jean-Marie Leclair the younger =

French composer

Jean-Marie Leclair le cadet, (Jean-Marie Leclair the Younger) (1703 – 30 November 1777) was a French composer, and younger brother of the better-known Jean-Marie Leclair l'aîné ("the elder"). A third brother was named Pierre.

His musical output includes several works for two violins. In 1733, he produced Le Rhône et la Saône, a vocal piece. Publications include his Opus 1 (1739) and Opus 2 (1750).
