= Claude Perraudin =

French musician (1948–2001)

Claude Perraudin (4 April 1948 – January 2001) was a French composer, guitarist and conductor.

He was born in Paris in 1948 and died at Vincennes in January 2001.

Claude Perraudin worked with such famous artists as:

- Jacques Dutronc (1967–1969)
- Claude François (1969–1972)
- Serge Lama (1973–1989)
- Serge Gainsbourg (1969–1973) on record, uncredited
- Brigitte Bardot (1969–1973) on record, uncredited
- Jane Birkin (1969–1973) on record, uncredited

== In popular culture ==
Perrudin's piece Le Printemps Dans Tes Bras Was featured in the fifth episode of Adult Swim's show Common Side Effects.

== Discography ==
- Guitar Tenderness (1999)
- Janus (1989) nickname : Greg Baker
- Jogging (1981)
- Mutation 24 (1977)
