= Jules Auguste Wiernsberger =

French composer

Jean Jules Auguste Wiernsberger (5 July 1857 – 15 December 1925) was a French composer from Alsace.

== Life and music ==
Wiernsberger was born in Mulhouse. He received his first music lessons from his father Jean Wiernsberger (1833–1890) and left Alsace following the annexation of 1871 with his family to settle in Paris. He then entered the Paris Conservatory where he was a pupil of Émile Durand, Napoléon Henri Reber and Antoine Marmontel. He obtained a second prize for piano in 1876 and continued his studies in Basel.

On his return to France in 1878, he settled in Reims, taking an active part in local musical life. He was a music teacher, directed the choir Alsace-Lorraine Orphéon, and from 1884 the choirs of the Reims Philharmonic Society. His opera Rioval was premiered at the Opéra de Reims on 18 February 1886. His lyrical drama Rosemonde was created in Tournai on 25 February 1892.

His Violin Sonata, Op. 32 was awarded first prize by the Société des Compositeurs de Musique in 1896. From 1897 to 1899, he was editor of the Revue musicale Sainte-Cécile. In 1899, he won the Chartier Prize of the Institut de France for his chamber music production and was awarded the "Palmes académiques" (in 1905 he was promoted to the rank of "Officier de l'instruction publique").

Wiernsberger settled in Paris, was artistic secretary of the Gaveau piano factory and published light music under the pseudonym Nestor Sappé. It was under this name that he took legal action against SACEM, which he won, concerning a dispute over the redistribution of copyright. Later he edited numerous works by composers of the baroque and classical periods for the publisher Heugel for educational purposes.

As a composer he mainly wrote "mélodies" (art songs), piano pieces and chamber music.

Wiernsberger died aged 68 in Villers-Cotterêts.

== Selected compositions ==
Stage works

- Rioval, "scène lyrique" (libretto: Emmanuel Ducros), Reims, 18 February 1886
- Rosemonde, Tournai, 25 February 1892

Orchestral music

- Souvenir d'autrefois, Op. 17 (two marches) (1877)
- Stances, Op. 21, for violin and orchestra (piano reduction available) (1887)

Chamber music

- Sérénade, Op. 13, for violin and piano (1882)
- Suite, Op. 14, for piano trio
- Piano trio, Op. 18
- Mélodie, Op. 28, for violin and organ or piano (1897)
- Violin Sonata, Op. 32 (1900)
- Deux Cantilènes, Op. 40, for viola (or violin) and piano (1904)

Piano music

- Variations-études, Op. 4 (1878)
- Moments perdus. 5 esquisses (1879)
- Souvenir de l'Ermitage, Op. 7 (1881)
- Romance sans paroles, Op. 8 (1882)
- Tarentelle, Op. 18 (1890)
- Au bord du Lac Léman, Op. 22 (1889)
- Berceuse, Op. 37 (1901)
- Brises printanières, Op. 38 (1904)

Songs

- À une femme (words by Victor Hugo) (1878)
- Barcarolle (Édouard Guinand), Op. 10 (1881)
- Boléro (É. Guinand), Op. 11 (1881)
- Avant l'orage (Emmanuel Ducros) (1884)
- Au bord du ruisseau (E. Ducros) (1884)
- Sur la plage. Rêverie (A. Febvre) (1889)
- Sérénade d'hiver (E. Guinand) (1891)
- Chansons lointaines. Six mélodies (Pierre Reyniel) (1924)

Choral music

- Chanson des blés. Choeur à 3 voix égales (Paul Miret) (1880)
- En guerre!, for 4-part male choir, Op. 12 (1882)
