= Jean-Marie Leclair =

French violinist

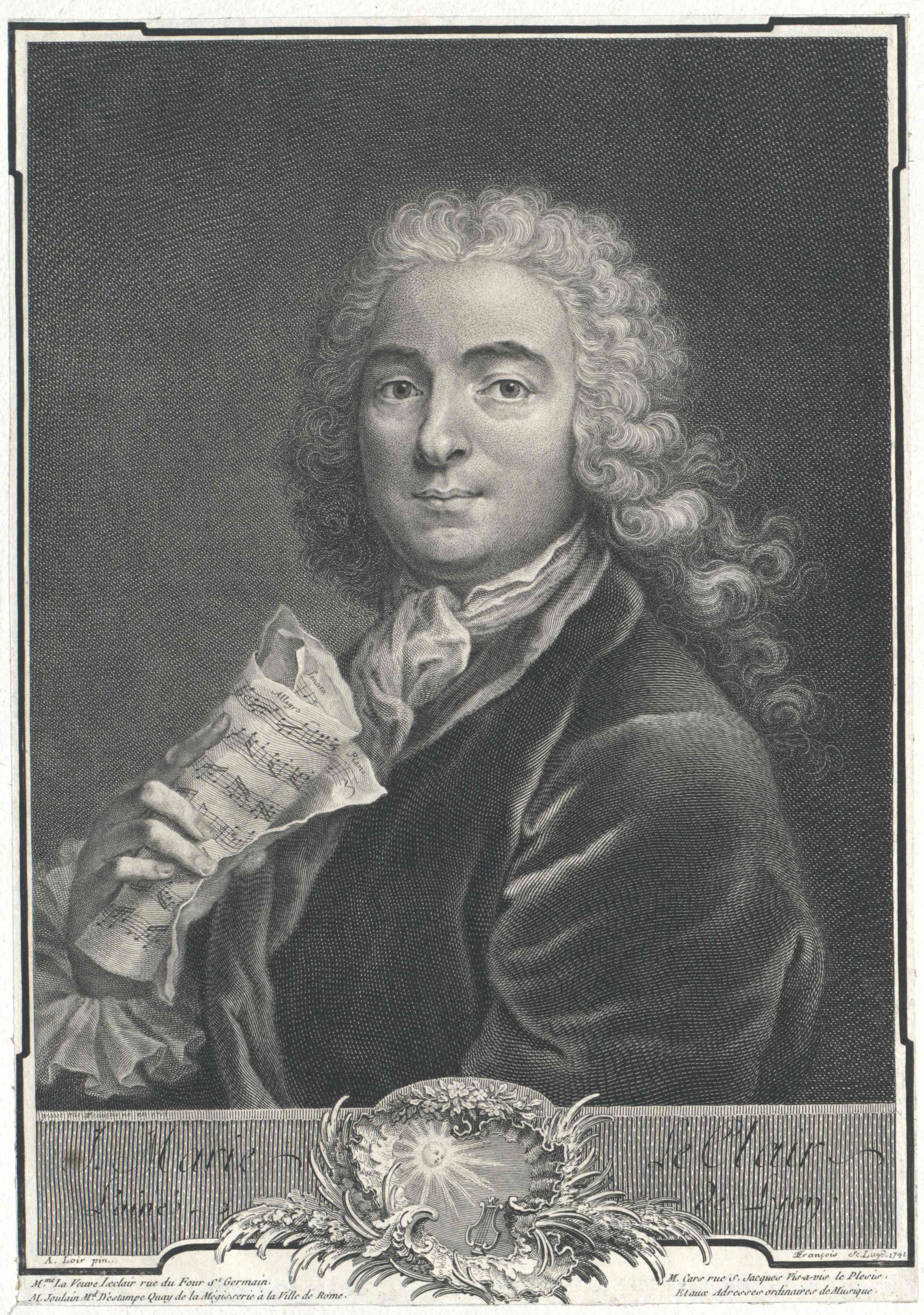
- Born: Jean-Marie Leclair l'aîné 10 May 1697; Lyon, France
- Died: 22 October 1764 (aged 67)
- Other name: The Elder
- Occupations: violinist, composer

Jean-Marie Leclair l'aîné (French: [ʒɑ̃ maʁi ləklɛʁ]; Jean-Marie Leclair the Elder) (10 May 1697 – 22 October 1764) was a French Baroque violinist and composer. He is considered to have founded the French violin school. His brothers, the lesser-known Jean-Marie Leclair the younger (1703–77) as well as Pierre Leclair (1709–84) and Jean-Benoît Leclair (1714–after 1759), were also musicians.

== Biography ==
Leclair was born in Lyon, but left to study dance and the violin in Turin. In 1716, he married Marie-Rose Casthanie, a dancer, who died about 1728. Leclair had returned to Paris in 1723, where he played at the Concert Spirituel, the main semi-public music series. His works included several sonatas for flute and basso continuo.

In 1730, Leclair married for the second time. His new wife was the engraver Louise Roussel, who prepared for printing all his works from Opus 2 onward. He was named ordinaire de la musique (Director of Music of the Chapel and the Apartments) by Louis XV in 1733, Leclair dedicated his third book of violin sonatas to the king. Leclair resigned in 1736 after a clash with Jean-Pierre Guignon over control of the musique du Roi.

Leclair was then engaged by the Princess of Orange – a fine harpsichordist and former student of Handel – and from 1738 until 1743, served three months annually at her court in Leeuwarden, working in The Hague as a private maestro di cappella for the remainder of the year. He returned to Paris in 1743. His only opera Scylla et Glaucus was first performed in 1746 and has been revived in modern times. From 1740 until his death in Paris, he served the Duke of Gramont, in whose private theatre at Puteaux were staged works to which Leclair is known to have contributed. They included, in particular, a lengthy divertissement for the comedy Les dangers des épreuves (1749) and one complete entrée, Apollon et Climène, for the opéra-ballet by various authors, Les amusemens lyriques (1750).

Leclair was renowned as a violinist and as a composer. He successfully drew upon all of Europe's national styles. Many suites, sonatas, and concertos survive along with his opera, while some vocal works, ballets, and other stage music are lost.

=== Murder ===
Jean-Marie Leclair (1697–1764) – Sonata Op.2, No.3 in C-Major from Second Livre de Sonates pour le Violon et pour le Flute Traversiere avec le Basse Continuo (1730)
Performed by New Comma Baroque

In 1758, after the break-up of his second marriage, Leclair purchased a small house in a dangerous Parisian neighbourhood in the northern part of Le Marais near the old Temple, where he was found stabbed to death on 23 October 1764. Although the murder remains a mystery, there is a possibility that his ex-wife may have been behind it—her motive being financial gain—although suspicion also rests strongly on his nephew, Guillaume-François Vial, an embittered violinist who desperately wanted employment.

Leclair was buried in the Church of Saint-Laurent, in Paris.

== List of works ==
- Op. 1 No. 1 – Violin Sonata in A minor
- Op. 1 No. 2 – Violin Sonata in C major
- Op. 1 No. 3 – Violin Sonata in B♭ major
- Op. 1 No. 4 – Violin Sonata in D major
- Op. 1 No. 5 – Violin Sonata in G major
- Op. 1 No. 6 – Violin Sonata in E minor
- Op. 1 No. 7 – Violin Sonata in F major
- Op. 1 No. 8 – Violin Sonata in G major
- Op. 1 No. 9 – Violin Sonata in A major
- Op. 1 No. 10 – Violin Sonata in D major
- Op. 1 No. 11 – Violin Sonata in B♭ major
- Op. 1 No. 12 – Violin Sonata in B minor
- Op. 2 No. 1 – Violin Sonata in E minor
- Op. 2 No. 2 – Violin Sonata in F major
- Op. 2 No. 3 – Violin Sonata in C major
- Op. 2 No. 4 – Violin Sonata in A major
- Op. 2 No. 5 – Violin Sonata in G major
- Op. 2 No. 6 – Violin Sonata in D major
- Op. 2 No. 7 – Violin Sonata in B♭ major
- Op. 2 No. 8 – Violin Sonata in D major
- Op. 2 No. 9 – Violin Sonata in E major
- Op. 2 No. 10 – Violin Sonata in C minor
- Op. 2 No. 11 – Violin Sonata in B minor
- Op. 2 No. 12 – Violin Sonata in G minor
- Op. 3 No. 1 – Sonata for 2 violins in G major
- Op. 3 No. 2 – Sonata for 2 violins in A major
- Op. 3 No. 3 – Sonata for 2 violins in C major
- Op. 3 No. 4 – Sonata for 2 violins in F major
- Op. 3 No. 5 – Sonata for 2 violins in E minor
- Op. 3 No. 6 – Sonata for 2 violins in D major
- Op. 4 No. 1 – Trio for 2 violins & continuo in D minor
- Op. 4 No. 2 – Trio for 2 violins & continuo in B♭ major
- Op. 4 No. 3 – Trio for 2 violins & continuo in D minor
- Op. 4 No. 4 – Trio for 2 violins & continuo in F major
- Op. 4 No. 5 – Trio for 2 violins & continuo in G minor
- Op. 4 No. 6 – Trio for 2 violins & continuo in A major
- Op. 5 No. 1 – Violin Sonata in A major
- Op. 5 No. 2 – Violin Sonata in F major
- Op. 5 No. 3 – Violin Sonata in E minor
- Op. 5 No. 4 – Violin Sonata in B♭ major
- Op. 5 No. 5 – Violin Sonata in B minor
- Op. 5 No. 6 – Violin Sonata in C minor "Le Tombeau"
- Op. 5 No. 7 – Violin Sonata in A minor
- Op. 5 No. 8 – Violin Sonata in D major
- Op. 5 No. 9 – Violin Sonata in E major
- Op. 5 No. 10 – Violin Sonata in C major
- Op. 5 No. 11 – Violin Sonata in G minor
- Op. 5 No. 12 – Violin Sonata in G major
- Op. 6 – Récréation de musique in D major
- Op. 7 No. 1 – Violin Concerto in D minor (1737 homotonal, with all movements in D minor)
- Op. 7 No. 2 – Violin Concerto in D major
- Op. 7 No. 3 – Violin Concerto in C major
- Op. 7 No. 4 – Violin Concerto in F major
- Op. 7 No. 5 – Violin Concerto in A minor
- Op. 7 No. 6 – Violin Concerto in A major
- Op. 8 – Récréation de musique in G minor
- Op. 9 No. 1 – Violin Sonata in A major
- Op. 9 No. 2 – Violin Sonata in E minor
- Op. 9 No. 3 – Violin Sonata in D major "Le Tambourin"
- Op. 9 No. 4 – Violin Sonata in A major
- Op. 9 No. 5 – Violin Sonata in A minor
- Op. 9 No. 6 – Violin Sonata in D major
- Op. 9 No. 7 – Violin Sonata in G major
- Op. 9 No. 8 – Violin Sonata in C major
- Op. 9 No. 9 – Violin Sonata in E♭ major
- Op. 9 No. 10 – Violin Sonata in F♯ minor
- Op. 9 No. 11 – Violin Sonata in G minor
- Op. 9 No. 12 – Violin Sonata in G major
- Op. 10 No. 1 – Violin Concerto in B♭ major
- Op. 10 No. 2 – Violin Concerto in A major
- Op. 10 No. 3 – Violin Concerto in D major
- Op. 10 No. 4 – Violin Concerto in F major
- Op. 10 No. 5 – Violin Concerto in E minor
- Op. 10 No. 6 – Violin Concerto in G minor
- Op. 11 – Scylla et Glaucus, tragédie en musique with prologue and five acts (opera, fp. 1746)
- Op. 12 No. 1 – Sonata for 2 violins in B minor
- Op. 12 No. 2 – Sonata for 2 violins in E major
- Op. 12 No. 3 – Sonata for 2 violins in D major
- Op. 12 No. 4 – Sonata for 2 violins in A major
- Op. 12 No. 5 – Sonata for 2 violins in G minor
- Op. 12 No. 6 – Sonata for 2 violins in B♭ major
- Divertissement for Le danger des épreuves, a one-act comedy given at the Duke of Gramont's theatre at Puteaux on 19 June 1749 [lost]
- Apollon et Climène, seconde entrée des Amusemens lyriques, given at the Duke of Gramont's theatre at Puteaux, in February 1750 [lost]
- Incidental airs and dances for various theatrical productions (1751–1764) [lost]
- Op. 13 No. 1 – Ouvertura for 2 violins & continuo in G major
- Op. 13 No. 2 – Trio for 2 violins & continuo in D major
- Op. 13 No. 3 – Ouvertura for 2 violins & continuo in D major
- Op. 13 No. 4 – Trio for 2 violins & continuo in B minor
- Op. 13 No. 5 – Ouvertura for 2 violins & continuo in A major
- Op. 13 No. 6 – Trio for 2 violins & continuo in G minor
- Op. 14 – Trio for 2 violins & continuo in A major
- Op. 15 – Violin Sonata in F major

== See also ==
- List of unsolved murders (before 1900)
