= Jean-Henri Ravina =

French musician

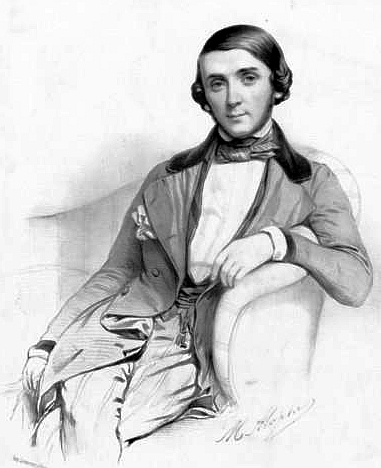
Jean-Henri Ravina

Jean-Henri Ravina (20 May 1818 – 30 September 1906) was a French virtuoso pianist, composer and teacher.

Jean-Henri Ravina started his musical studies with his mother, Eugénie Ravina, a famous professor in Bordeaux. He made his first public appearance performing works by Friedrich Kalkbrenner at the age of 8, and the violinist Pierre Rode, who was present at the concert, encouraged him to continue his musical studies. Ravina then went to Paris, where he attended the private musical school of Alkan Morhange (Charles-Valentin Alkan's father), later he entered the piano class of Pierre-Joseph-Guillaume Zimmermann at the Paris Conservatory. He also studied counterpoint with Anton Reicha and Aimé Leborne there. In 1834 he received a first prize for piano performance.

The 17-year-old Ravina became assistant to a professor at the Conservatory, but he resigned two years later to devote himself to his career as a virtuoso. He became a touring pianist, with performances in France, Spain and Russia. His whirlwind tours were highly acclaimed, and his compositions were immensely popular with his fans. At the same time he acquired an excellent reputation as a music teacher.

== Music ==
Ravina published several pieces for piano: etudes, concertos, rondos, divertimentos, variations and fantasies. He also made a transcription of Beethoven's symphonies for piano four-hands.

- Chanson joyeuse, op 99 (Publisher: BMI, 1941, arrangement by Teddy Raph)

Ravina was named as Chevalier of the Legion of Honor in 1861.

Charles-Valentin Alkan and Antoine François Marmontel, famous French pianists, were his good friends.

== Sources ==
- Haine, Malou (1995). 400 lettres de musiciens: au Musée royal de Mariemont (in French). Mardaga. p. 411. ISBN 2-87009-578-3.
