= Louis de Caix d'Hervelois =

French composer (1670-1759)

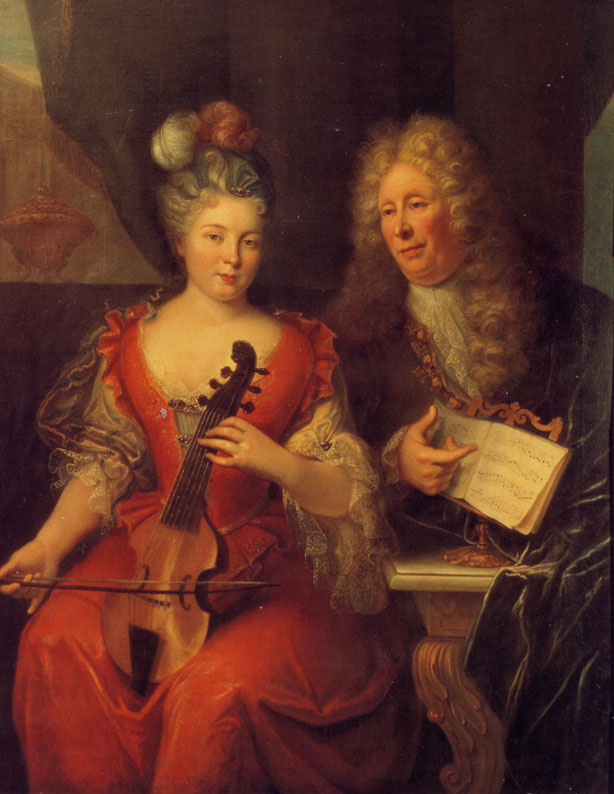
Portrait presumed to be of Louis de Caix d'Hervelois and Marie-Anne de Caix. (French School, 18th Century, Private collection).

Louis de Caix d'Hervelois (pronounced [lwi də ke də‿ɛʁ.və.lwa]; c. 1670 in France – 18 October 1759 in France) was a composer of chamber music.

== Biography ==
Caix d'Hervelois wrote music almost exclusively for the viol. Most of his other works exist as transcriptions from his viol music. A native of the north of France, almost nothing is known of his life. However, his changing addresses appear in his published music as well as in passing in contemporary discussions of the viol, and in brief notes in archives. The longest archival text (1697) documents a request by a canon of Sainte-Chapelle, annoyed by the noise of the young chapelain ordinaire Caix learning to play the viol, that Caix practice in a room under the stairs. Louis de Caix d'Hervelois was a pupil of the great Marin Marais.

Caix's tuneful, graceful music is firmly in the French tradition of character pieces in dance suites. It is among the most idiomatic music written for the viol, its apparent simplicity deepening when interpreted in the light of the traditions of French viol performance practice. The French musicologist Philippe Beaussant wrote of Caix's music and anonymity:

« L'on pourrait considérer Caix d'Hervelois comme une sort de pseudonyme sous lequel se cacherait un personnage réel, dont le nom est: la Viole, en France, au moment où elle est en passe de disparaître. »

"One might look upon Caix d'Hervelois as a sort of pseudonym masking a person whose name was 'the Viol, of France, just at the moment when it was about to disappear.'"

Facsimile editions of Caix's music are available from Éditions J.M. Fuzeau, the Société de Musicologie de Languedoc, and from Éditions August Zurfluh, the last of which also sponsors the Association Caix d'Hervelois.
