= Guillon (composer) =

French composer, musician and military officer (fl. 1776 – c. 1787)

Guillon, sometimes given as De Guillon (fl. 1776 – c. 1787) was a French composer, violinist, bassoonist, and military officer. He was a composer of chamber music and symphonies.

== Biography ==
The earliest known record of Guillon is from April 1776 which indicates he was serving as an officer in Bouillon's German infantry regiment. In his earliest known published work, a duet for violin and viola (op.1, 1776), he referred to himself as an amateur musician. This was followed by his first string quartet (op. 2, 1778) After leaving the military he was employed as a violinist and bassoonist, being particularly gifted at the former instrument according to musicologist François-Joseph Fétis.

In 1781 Guillon published six symphonies for large orchestra which were collectively titled opus 3. From 1783 to 1787 he published six string quartets known collectively as his opus 4 quartets. Nothing else is known about Guillon's whereabouts or activities.
