= Olivier Aubert =

French composer, cellist and guitarist

- Born: Pierre François Olivier Aubert; 1763; Amiens, France
- Died: 1830 (aged 66–67)
- Occupations: Cellist, guitarist, composer
- Instruments: cello, classical guitar

Pierre François Olivier Aubert (1763 – c.1830) was a French cellist, guitarist and composer. He mostly abbreviated his name as "P. F. Olivier Aubert".

== Biography ==
Aubert was born in Amiens. After having received initial musical training in his home town, he studied the cello autodidactically. In 1787 he is first mentioned as a cello teacher in Paris. He played in various musical theatres and opera houses and was a member of the orchestra of the Opéra-Comique for 25 years. After having heard Ferdinando Carulli perform in Paris in 1808, he also turned to the guitar; it is not known whether he had any formal tuition on this instrument.

His chief merit is having published two good instruction books for the cello at a time when works of that kind were rare and much needed. Besides solo music for his two instruments, he wrote also chamber music including string quartets. In a pamphlet entitled Histoire abrégée de la musique ancienne et moderne he expressed his opinion about several writings on ancient and modern music.

Aubert frequently published his compositions himself. He died in Paris aged around 67.

== Works ==
Chamber music

- 3 String Quartets, Op. 1 (Zurich, 1796)
- 3 String Quartets, Op. 2 (Zurich, 1796)
- 3 String Quartets, Op. 4 (Paris)
- Duos No. 1 and No. 2, for guitar and piano (Paris, c.1820s)
- Deux duos, for violin and guitar (Paris, c.1820s)

Cello music, solos and duos

- Trois duos pour deux violons ou deux violoncelles, Op. 3 (Paris: Aubert, 1802); online at Gallica
- 3 duos for 2 cellos, Op. 5
- Trois duo, Op. 6 (Paris: Imbault, c.1800); online at Gallica
- Trois duo concertans, Op. 7 (Paris: Imbault, c.1800); online at Gallica
- Études pour le violoncelle, suivies de trois duos et de trois sonates, Op. 8 (Paris, also Offenbach, 1800)
- Methode, ou Nouvelles études pour le violoncelle, Op. 9 (Paris, 1802; also Paris: Janet et Cotelle, c.1830)
- Trois duos faciles suite à la Méthode, Op. 11
- Trois duos dialogués et concertants, Op. 12
- Les Marchandes de plaisir d'artichauds, de pommes de terres et de gateaux de Nanterre: Quatre duos [...] sur différents cris de Paris, Op. 13
- Sonatines, Op. 14 (published in Paris); Op. 19 (Paris); Op. 32 (Lyon); Op. 36 (Paris)
- Trois duetti, Op. 30
- Rondo for solo cello

Guitar music, solos and duos

- Potpourri facile (Paris)
- Premier potpourri (Paris)
- 2ème potpourri (Paris)
- 4ème potpourri (Lyon)
- 5ème potpourri (Paris)
- Trois petits duos, Op. 15 (Paris)
- Trois Duetti, Op. 34 (Paris, 1825)
- Méthode de guitare à 5 et 6 cordes (Paris)

Songs

- Le Chien de l'aveugle (text: Auguste Creuzé de Lesser), for voice and guitar (Paris, after 1800)
- Ce qui captive les hommes, "petit air" (anonymous text), for voice and guitar (Paris: Aubert, c.1825); online at Gallica

Arrangements of music by other composers

- Quatuor [= Ignaz Pleyel's string quartet, Op. 2], arrangé en duo pour guitare et violon (Paris, c.1784)

Book

- Histoire abrégée de la musique ancienne et moderne, ou Réflexions sur ce qu'il y a de plus probable dans les écrits qui ont traité ce sujet (Paris, 1827).
