= Auguste Pilati =

French composer and opera conductor

Auguste Pilati (actual name "Auguste Pilate") (29 September 1810 – 1 August 1877) was a prolific French composer, opera conductor and occasional singer. He employed several pseudonyms including "Auguste Pilati Juliano", "A. P. Juliano", "Ate. P. Juliano", "A. Ruytler", "P. Ruytler", and "Wolfart". He wrote about 40 works for the stage, including operas, operettas, and ballets besides a very large number of popular songs and piano works.

== Career ==
Born in Bouchain, a small town between Cambrai and Valenciennes in the French département Nord, Pilati studied at the Paris Conservatory where he won a first prize in solfège as early as 1823, but from which he was dismissed.

Arthur Pougin (1880) described him as an "extremely fertile composer, whose name is virtually unknown to the public, although he was not without talent" ("extrêmement fécond, dont le nom est pourtant à peu près inconnu du public, quoiqu'il ne fût point sans talent"). He seems to have been able to live mainly from the sale of his own compositions and conducting his stage works, although he also had short-term employments as musical director of small theatres in Paris such as the Théâtre Beaumarchais and the Théâtre des Folies-Marigny, and he often conducted the orchestra of the Théâtre de la Porte Saint-Martin. He also frequently appeared as a singer or duo partner in the Parisian café-concerts of his day.

Pougin considered his music "graceful and distinguished", but also thought that he "overdid himself under poor conditions and ended up sacrificing art to craft" ("gracieuse et distingué, mais qui s'est trop prodigué, et dans de mauvaises conditions, et qui a fini par sacrifier l'art au metier").

In the last fifteen years of his life, Pilati signed his vocal and piano works as either "A. P. Juliano" or "Ate. P. Juliano". Among these are a large number of technically easy works intended for children, but also numerous salon works, waltzes, quadrilles etc. intended for showy performance as well as home use.

Pilati died in Paris.

== Selected works ==
=== Stage ===
- La Modiste et le Lord, 2 acts, Théâtre des Variétés, 23 October 1833
- La Prova d'un opéra seria, 1 act, Théâtre du Palais-Royal, 4 July 1835
- La Fermière de Bolbec, Théâtre du Palais-Royal, 24 December 1835
- Léona, ou Le Parisien en Corse, 2 acts, Théâtre du Palais-Royal, 14 January 1836
- Olivier Basselin, 1 act, Théâtre de la Renaissance, 15 November 1838
- Mademoiselle de Fontanges, 2 acts, Théâtre de la Renaissance, 11 March 1839
- La Naufrage de la Méduse, 4 acts, Théâtre de la Renaissance, 31 May 1839 (with Albert Grisar and Friedrich von Flotow)
- Les Farfadets, "ballet-féerie" in 3 acts, Théâtre de la Porte Saint-Martin, 8 May 1841
- Les Barricades, 2 acts, Théâtre Lyrique, 5 March 1848 (with Eugène Gautier)
- Le Postillon de Saint-Valéry, opéra-comique in 2 acts, Théâtre de la Porte Saint-Martin, 1849
- Les Étoiles, 2 acts, Théâtre Lyrique, 6 February 1854
- Les Statues de l'Alcade, ballet-pantomime in 1 act, Théâtre des Bouffes-Parisiens, 29 December 1855
- Jean le Sot, 1 act, Théâtre des Folies-Nouvelles, 1856
- Une Devinette, 1 act, Théâtre des Folies-Nouvelles, 1856
- L'Amour et Psyché, 1 act, Théâtre des Variétés, 13 December 1856
- Trois Dragons, 1 act, Théâtre des Folies-Nouvelles, 1857
- L'Ile de Calypso, 1 act, Théâtre des Folies-Nouvelles, 1857 (under the pseudonym Ruytler)
- Peau d'âne, 1 act, Théâtre des Folies-Nouvelles, 1858 (under the pseudonym Ruytler)
- Ignace le retors, 1 act, Théâtre des Folies-Nouvelles, 15 September 1858
- Il Signor Cascarelli, 1 act, Théâtre Débureau, 1858
- L'Ile du sol-si-ré, 1 act, Théâtre Déjazet, March 1860 (under the pseudonym Ruytler)
- Il Maestro Blaguarino, 1 act, Lille, Théâtre, 25 December 1865
- Rosette et Colin, 1 act, Concert de la Scala, December 1874
- Les Pêcheurs de Tarente, divertissement, Théâtre des Folies-Oller, 14 November 1876
- Jacques et Jacqueline, 1 act, Concert de l'Alcazar [n. d.]
- La Nymphe et le Berger, divertissement, Concert de l'Alcazar [n. d.]
