= Jean Huré =

French composer and organist (1877–1930)

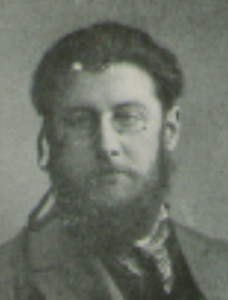
- Born: 17 September 1877; Gien, Loiret, France
- Died: 27 January 1930 (aged 52); Paris, France

Jean-Louis Charles Huré (17 September 1877 – 27 January 1930) was a French composer and organist. Though educated in music at a monastery in Angers, he was mostly self-taught.

== Life ==
Born in Gien, Loiret, France, on 17 September 1877, Huré studied anthropology, composition, improvisation and medieval music at the École Saint-Maurille in Angers and served as organist at the cathedral in the city. In 1895, he moved to Paris, where he was advised by Charles-Marie Widor and Charles Koechlin to study at the Conservatory. Huré preferred to live an independent life.

From 1910, he taught at the École Normale Supérieure, where Yves Nat and Manuel Rosenthal were among his students. In 1911, Huré helped found the Paris Mozart Society; he was also a member of the short-lived Association des Compositeurs Bretons during 1912–14. He worked as organist at the churches of Notre-Dame-des-Blancs-Manteaux, Saint-Martin-des-Champs and Saint-Séverin between 1911 and 1914. From 1924, he was appointed successor to Lucien Grandjany at Sacré-Cœur and from 1926, as the successor to Eugene Gigout at Saint-Augustin. Between 1924 and 1926, Huré edited and published a monthly journal called L'Orgue et les Organistes.

In addition to a number of organ works, Huré composed a comic opera and a ballet, three symphonies and chamber works. In 2010, a CD with works by Huré was recorded, featuring a four-movement sonata for violin and piano and a piano quintet performed by the Quatuor Louvigny and pianist Marie-Josephe Jude.

Huré died in Paris on 27 January 1930.

== Works ==
Stage

- Te Deum: extrait de Jeanne d'Arc, poème théâtral (1895); words by A. Vincent
- La Cathédrale (1910)
- Au bois sacré, ballet in 1 act (1921)
- Le Rajah de Mysore, Operetta

Orchestral

- Symphony No. 1 (1896)
- Symphony No. 2 (1897)
- Symphony No. 3 (1903)
- Poèmes enfantins for chamber orchestra (1906)
- Nocturne (Paris: A.Z. Mathot, 1908)
- Prélude symphonique for orchestra

Concertante

- Air for violin or cello and orchestra (1902)
- Nocturne for piano and orchestra (1903)
- Andante for alto saxophone, string orchestra, harp, timpani and organ (1915)
- Concertstück for saxophone and orchestra
- Concerto for cello and orchestra (1929)
- Concerto for violin and orchestra

Chamber music

- Suite sur des chants bretons for violin, cello and piano or harp (1898; Paris: A.Z. Mathot, 1913)
- Sonata in C minor for violin and piano (1900–1901)
- Petite chanson for cello (or viola) and piano (1901)
- Air in F major for cello and piano or organ (1901)
- Sonata No. 1 in F♯ minor for cello and piano (1903; Paris: A. Z. Mathot, 1914)
- Sonata for violin and piano (c. 1905)
- Sonata No. 2 in F major for cello and piano (1906)
- Sonatine in G major for violin and piano (1907; Paris: A.Z. Mathot, 1909)
- Piano Quintet (1907–08; Paris: A.Z. Mathot, 1914)
- Sonata No. 3 in F♯ major for cello and piano (1909)
- String Quartet No. 1 in C major (1913–1917)
- Prélude for violin (or cello) and organ
- Sérénade for piano, violin and violoncello (1920)
- Sonata for violin and piano (1920)
- String Quartet No. 2 (Paris: M. Sénart, 1921)
- Sonata No. 4 for cello and piano (1924)

Organ

- Interlude-élévation for organ or harmonium (1911)
- Communion pour une Messe de Minuit à Noël (Communion on a Noel: Offertory for Midnight Mass) (1913)
- Prélude pour une messe Pontificale (1915)

Piano

- Poèmes Enfantin (1906)
- Jacques et Jacqueline (Paris: A. Z. Mathot, ca 1910; Musica, July 1912, Pierre Lafitte et Cie)
- Sonata No. 1 in F minor for piano (or harp) (1907; Paris: A. Z. Mathot, 1913)
- Sonata No. 2 (1916)

Vocal

- Élégie for voice, cello and piano (Paris: A. Z. Mathot, 1905); words by René de Brédenbec
- Te Deum for soprano, chorus and organ (Paris: A. Z. Mathot, 1907)
- Sept chantons de Bretagne for voice and piano (Paris: A. Z. Mathot, 1910)
- Ave Maria for 2 female voices (1924; Paris: Éditions musicales de la Schola cantorum et de la Procure générale de musique, 1956)
- L'Âme en peine for 4 voices (1925)
- 4 Lettres de femmes for voice and piano (1928)
- 4 Poèmes for voice and piano (1929); words by Arnould Grémilly
- Trois Chansons monodiques for solo voice (1930); words by André Spire
- Belle, j'entends bien tourner la meule du moulin for voice and chamber orchestra

Literary

- Chansons et danses bretonnes précédées d'une étude sur la monodie populaire (Angers, 1902)
- Dogmes musicaux (Le Monde musical, Paris, 1909)
- Technique du piano (Paris, 1909)
- Introduction à la technique du piano (Paris, 1910)
- Défense et illustration de la musique française (Angers, 1915)
- La Technique de l'orgue (Paris, 1918)
- L'Esthétique de l'orgue (Paris: Sénart, 1923)
- Saint Augustin musicien (Paris: Sénart, 1924)

== Bibliography ==
- Georges Migot: Jean Huré (Paris: Sénart, 1926)
- Jean Bonfils: Jean Huré (Kassel: Bärenreiter, 1957)
