= Clément Broutin =

French composer

Clément Jules Broutin (4 May 1851 – 27 May 1889) was a French composer.

== Life ==
Born in Orchies, Broutin studied with Victor Delannoy at the Conservatoire of Lyon from 1871 before joining the Conservatoire de Paris. There he was a pupil of Émile Durand for harmony, César Franck for organ and Victor Massé for musical composition. After an honorary mention in 1877 he won the First Grand Prix de Rome with the three-part scene La Fille de Jephté based on a text by Édouard Guinant.

During his stay at the Villa Medici in Rome, which was associated with the prize, Broutin composed Sinai, a work for soloists choir and orchestra, which was premiered in 1881 in the hall of the Paris Conservatory. The work was received coolly by the audience, but critics praised it for the excellent quality of the composition, its exquisite taste and great intelligence.

In the following years he composed a number of songs and piano pieces, several orchestral pieces and an opera. Most of his works were published by Henry Lemoine.

Broutin died in Roubaix aged 38. In his native town, a street was named after him.

== Selected works ==
Stage

- Rebecca à la fontaine, three-part scene (1877)
- Jenny, one-act opéra comique, libretto by Edmond Guiraud (1889)

Orchestral music

- 1er Suite pour orchestre, Op. 9
- Danse israélite (1881)
- Ouverture triomphale, Op. 13 (1885)
- 1er Fantaisie militaire for wind orchestra (1888)

Large-scale vocal music

- La Fille de Jephthé, cantata (1878)
- Sinai, cantata for choir, orchestra and soloists (1881)
- Choeur de buveurs for male-voice choir (1882)
- L'Océan, chorus for three equal voices (Arrenaud) (1886)
- Moïse du Mont Sinaï (Moses at Mount Sinaï), "drame biblique" (Édouard Guinand, English translation by F. Toombs) (1887)

Chamber music

- Cantabile, Op. 10 for violin and piano (1885)
- Carentelle, Op. 11 for violin and piano (1885)
- Deux Pièces for violin and piano (1886)

Piano music

- Dix Pièces familières (1882)
- Mazurka lente (1883)

Songs

- Premier soupir (Victor Hugo) (1879)
- Connais-tu l'heure enchanteresse (Alphonse Labitte) (1881)
- Vision (Édouard Guinand) (1881)
- Berceuse (É. Guinand) (1882)
- Chanson de printemps (Armand Dayot) (1883)
- Barcarolle (Paul d'Arras) (1885)
- Deux Nouvelles mélodies (A. Labitte) (1885). 1: "À l'Angelus"; 2: "Revenez douces hirondelles"
- Habanera (S. Compon) (1885)
- Le Rossignol et la rose. Petite scène mélodique (Paul Robert du Costal) for voice and piano with flute ad lib. (1888)
