= Charles Delioux =

French composer

Jean-Charles Delioux (de) Savignac (17 April 1825 – 12 November 1915) was a French composer, a pupil of Halévy and potentially Chopin, who was quite popular in the Paris salons of the nineteenth century.

== Life ==
Charles Delioux was born in the Breton town of Lorient, Morbihan. He received his early musical education from his father, a local naval commissioner, and appeared as a child prodigy on the piano in Lorient and as early as 1839 at the Tuileries before King Louis Philippe. During his early years in Paris, he was a pupil of Pierre Zimmerman.

In 1845, he began his studies at the Paris Conservatory with Fromental Halévy (composition) and Auguste Barbereau (harmony) and won an award ("1er Accessit") in the same year for counterpoint and fugue. There are also hints that he studied privately with Frédéric Chopin as witnessed by his pupil Victor Gilles (1884–1964). He was admitted to compete for the Prix de Rome in 1847, but after he failed, he never re-entered. From 1849 he established himself as piano teacher in Paris and was so much sought after that he could support his wider family, after his father had died shortly before. Among his better known pupils was Alexis de Castillon. He was also quite successful as a composer, mainly for the piano, for which he published more than a hundred compositions. His taste and reputation led to becoming a jury member of competitions at the Conservatory.

Delioux died in Paris.

== Music ==
Delioux's largest work was a comic opera, Yvonne et Loïc (libretto by Michel Carré), produced in 1854 at the Théâtre du Gymnase. But he excelled as a composer of virtuoso piano music, transcriptions of classics, pedagogical works, and songs.

Marmontel described him thus: "Il se trouve à la fois parmi les élus du talent et parmi les préférées de la vogue. […] Ses compositions se distinguent par la franchise des idées, la netteté d'exposition, l'élégant contour des mélodies et la distinction des harmonies." ("He is both among the chosen ones of talent and among the favourites of fashion. […] His compositions are distinguished by the frankness of his ideas, the clearness of his exposition, the elegant outline of his melodies and the distinction of his harmonies.") Brown described Delioux's piano music as "brilliant and pretty, and well adapted for showy performance".

== Selected compositions ==
=== Piano music ===
- Danse napolitaine, Op. 11 (1852)
- Valse brillante, Op. 12 (1853)
- Marche hongroise, Op. 14 (1853)
- Chanson créole. Rêverie, Op. 18 (1853)
- Une fête à Séville. Boléro, Op. 23 (1854)
- Cri de guerre. Marche caractéristique, Op. 30 (1854)
- Feuillet d'album, Op. 31 (1854)
- Chant du matin. Aubade, Op. 35 (1855)
- Chant du nord. Mazurka, Op. 37 (1856)
- Carnaval espagnol. Caprice de concert, Op. 38 (1856)
- Les Matelots. Scène maritime, Op. 40 (1857)
- 3 Romances sans paroles, vol. 1, Op. 44 (1857)
- Le Réveil. Aubade, Op. 53 (1858)
- Arabesques. Caprice, Op. 61 (1860)
- La Fête du sacre. Grand duo dramatique, piano 4-hands, Op. 63 (1861)
- Bonheur passé. Rêverie variée, Op. 70 (1861)
- Thème varié, Op. 77 (1866)
- Impressions de voyage, Op. 81 (1867)
- Soir d'été. Idylle, Op. 84 (1868)
- Menuet dans le style ancien, Op. 89 (1871)
- Elezanza. Impromptu, Op. 90 (1874)
- Gavotte, Op. 89 (1877)
- Lamento, Op. 101 (1884)
- Ballade, Op. 104 (1891)
- Tourment, Op. 106 (1894)
- Kermesse, Op. 118 (1896)
- Echo d'Italie. Notturno, Op. 120 (1899)
- Impressions religieuses, Op. 122 (1901)
