= Ninot le Petit =

French composer

Ninot le Petit (also Johannes Parvi) (fl. ca. 1500 – 1520) was a French composer of the Renaissance, probably associated with the French royal chapel. Although a substantial amount of his music has survived in several sources, his actual name is not known with certainty.

== Life ==
Two identifications have been proposed by musicologists in the latter half of the 20th century. The first possibility, suggested by Barton Hudson in 1979, is that le Petit may have been Johannes Baltazar alias le Petit, since a singer of that name was in the papal chapel between 1488 and 1502, and his name resembles that in the attribution of some "le Petit" motets in a Vatican manuscript. The second possibility is that "le Petit" may be the same as Jean Lepetit, the singing master at Langres Cathedral between 1506 and 1510. Baltazar died in 1502, Lepetit after 1529; stylistically the music of le Petit suggests composition in the first two decades of the 16th century.

== Music and influence ==
Le Petit's style is similar to that of Antoine de Févin and Jean Mouton, the two most famous French composers associated with the French royal chapel. He preferred clear harmonies, a texture occasionally broken by long duets, and contrasting sections in triple meter, somewhat blending the styles of Févin and Mouton. The chansons are light and open in texture, foreshadowing the developments in the genre later in the century.

Le Petit was listed by Pierre Moulu in his famous motet Mater floreat florescat as one of the leading composers of the day (this work, probably written around 1517, provides to musicologists a particularly useful list of composers working at the time, naming the composers associated with the French royal chapel which Moulu thought the most eloquent of the time).

== Works ==
One mass by le Petit has survived, as well as four motets and sixteen chansons. Many of his works have also been attributed to others; some, such as Lourdault lourdault garde que tu feras, are now considered to be reliably the work of others (in that case, Loyset Compère). Since one large block of chansons survived in one manuscript, but relatively little sacred music, and yet Moulu listed him as a famous composer, it can be inferred that most of his music has been lost.

=== Mass ===
- Missa sine nomine (mass without a name)

=== Motets ===
1. In illo tempore: Assumpsit Jesus;
2. O bone Jesu;
3. Psallite Noe, Judei credite;
4. Si oblitus fuero tui (has also been attributed to Jacob Obrecht)

=== Chansons ===
Many of these are lacking a bass voice part, since the bass part-book has been lost from the manuscript.

1. En chevauchant pres d'ung molin;
2. En l'ombre d'ung aubepin;
3. En revenant de Noyon;
4. Et la la la, faictez luy bonne chiere;
5. Et levez vo gambe, Jennette;
6. Et levez vous hau, Guillemette;
7. Gentilz gallans adventureulx;
8. Helas helas helas;
9. Hellas, hellas, qui me confortera;
10. Je mi levay l'autre nuytee;
11. L'ort villain jaloux;
12. Mon amy m'avoit promis;
13. Mon seul plaisir (a quodlibet as well as a ballade; has also been attributed to Josquin des Prez);
14. N'as tu poinct mis ton hauls bonnet;
15. Nostre chamberiere si malade elle est;
16. Pourtant si mon amy;
17. Si bibero crathere pleno.
