= Hyacinthe Jadin =

French composer

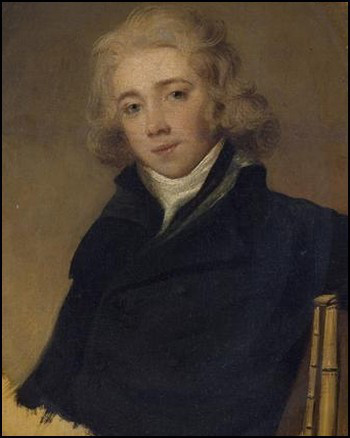
Hyacinthe Jadin

Hyacinthe Jadin (27 April 1776 – 27 September 1800) was a French composer who came from a musical family. His uncle Georges Jadin was a composer in Versailles and Paris, along with his father Jean Jadin, who had played bassoon for the French Royal Orchestra. He was one of five musical brothers, the best known of whom was Louis-Emmanuel Jadin.

== Life and career ==
Jadin was born in Versailles. At the age of 9, Jadin's first composition, a Rondo for piano, was published in the Journal de Clavecin. By the age of thirteen, Jadin had premiered his first work with the Concert Spirituel.

Jadin took a job in 1792 as assistant rehearsal pianist (Rezizativbegleiter) at the Theatre Feydeau. In this year he composed the Marche du siège de Lille ("March of the Siege of Lille"), commemorating the successful resistance of the citizens of Lille when besieged by Austrian forces.

In 1794, Jadin published an overture for 13 wind instruments entitled Hymn to 21 January. The piece commemorated the one-year anniversary of the execution of Citizen Capet (the name given to Louis XVI during his trial for treason). In 1795, he began teaching a female piano class at the Paris Conservatoire.

From 1795 until his death Jadin suffered from tuberculosis. At the time of his death, he was impoverished.

== Works ==
While chamber music formed a large part of Jadin's creative career, he is most well known for his progressive style of piano composition. Jadin's works anticipated the music of Ludwig van Beethoven and Franz Schubert; his piano sonatas in particular display a proto-Romanticism, which in parts both rejected and extended the heritage of his Classical predecessors.

=== Orchestra ===
- Piano Concerto No. 1 (1796–97)
  1. Allegro brillante
  2. Adagio
  3. Rondeau – Allegretto
- Piano Concerto No. 2 in D minor (1796), accompanied by 2 violins, viola, double bass, flutes, oboes, bassoons, and horns
  1. Allegro moderato
  2. Adagio
  3. Rondo – Allegro
- Piano Concerto No. 3 in A (1798), accompanied by 2 violins, viola, double bass, 2 flutes, 2 bassoons, and 2 horns
  1. Allegro moderato
  2. Rondo – Allegro

=== Concert band ===
- Ouverture pour instruments à vent (c. 1795)

=== Wind band with chorus ===
- Hymne du vingt-un janvier (1794), based on text by Ponce-Denis Écouchard-Lebrun
- Chanson pour la fête de l'agriculture (1796), based on text by Ange Etienne Xavier Poisson de Lachabeaussière
- Hymne du dix germinal, based on text by Théodore Désorgues

=== Stage ===
- Le testament mal-entendu (1793), comédie mêlée d'ariettes in 2 acts, libretto by François Guillaume Ducray-Duminil
- Cange ou Le commissionnaire de Lazare (1794), fait historique in 1 act, libretto by André-Pépin Bellement

=== Piano ===
- Rondo (1785)
- Piano (or Harpsichord) Sonata No. 1 in D (1794), accompanied by violin
  1. Allegro
  2. Andantino un poco allegretto
  3. Menuet: Allegro
  4. Final: Presto
- Piano (or Harpsichord) Sonata No. 2 in B♭ (1794), accompanied by violin
  1. Allegro fieramente
  2. Rondo: Allegretto non tropo
- Piano (or Harpsichord) Sonata No. 3 in F minor (1794), accompanied by violin
  1. Allegretto poco agitato
  2. Adagio
  3. Menuet: Allegro
  4. Rondo: Allegro non tropo
- Piano Sonatas, op. 3 nos. 1–3 (1795)
- Piano Sonata in B♭, op. 4 no. 1 (1795)
  1. Allegro
  2. Andante
  3. Finale: Presto
- Piano Sonata in F♯ minor, op. 4 no. 2 (1795)
  1. Allegro motto
  2. Menuet – Trio
  3. Finale: Allegro
- Piano Sonata in C♯ minor, op. 4 no. 3 (1795)
  1. Allegro moderato
  2. Adagio
  3. Rondeau: Allegretto
- Piano Sonata in F minor, op. 5 no. 1 (1795)
  1. Allegro moderato
  2. Adagio
  3. Final: Allegro
- Piano Sonata in D, op. 5 no. 2 (1795)
  1. Allegro
  2. Andante
  3. Final: Presto
- Piano Sonata in C minor, op. 5 no. 3 (1795)
  1. Allegro maestoso
  2. Andante
  3. Allegro
- Duo in F (1796), for four hands
  1. Allegro brillante
  2. Andante
  3. Rondo: Allegro
- Piano Sonata in C minor, op. 6 no. 1 (1800)
  1. Allegro moderato
  2. Andante sostenuto
  3. Final: Allegro
- Piano Sonata in A, op. 6 no. 2 (1800)
  1. Andante
  2. Rondeau: Allegretto
- Piano Sonata in F, op. 6 no. 3 (1800)
  1. Allegro moderato
  2. Adagio
  3. Allegro assai

=== Chamber ===
- String Quartets for 2 violins, viola, and violoncello
  - B♭, op. 1 no. 1 (1795)
    1. Largo – Allegro non troppo
    2. Adagio
    3. Menuet – Trio
    4. Finale – Allegro
  - A, op. 1 no. 2 (1795)
    1. Allegro
    2. Menuet – Trio
    3. Pastoral Andante
    4. Finale
  - F minor, op. 1 no. 3 (1795)
    1. Allegro moderato
    2. Menuet
    3. Adagio
    4. Polonaise
  - E♭, op. 2 no. 1 (1796)
    1. Largo – allegro moderato
    2. Adagio
    3. Menuetto
    4. Allegro Finale
  - B minor, op. 2 no. 2 (1796)
    1. Allegro
    2. Menuetto
    3. Adagio non troppo
    4. Allegro Finale
  - C, op. 2 no. 3 (1796)
    1. Allegro
    2. Andante
    3. Menuetto
    4. Presto Finale
  - C, op. 3 no. 1 (1797)
    1. Allegro moderato
    2. Adagio
    3. Menuette – Andante
    4. Presto Finale
  - E, op. 3 no. 2 (1797)
    1. Allegro moderato
    2. Menuet
    3. Adagio
    4. Allegro
  - A minor, op. 3 no. 3 (1797)
    1. Allegro moderato
    2. Adagio
    3. Menuet
    4. Finale
  - G, op. 4 no. 1 (1798)
    1. Allegro moderato
    2. Rondo Allegro
  - F, op. 4 no. 2 (1798)
    1. Allegro non troppo
    2. Minuetto Trio
    3. Adagio molto
    4. Allegro assai
  - D, op. 4 no. 3 (1798)
    1. Largo – Allegro moderato
    2. Minuetto
    3. Andante
    4. Finale Allegro
- String Trios books 1 & 2 for violin, viola, and violoncello.
  - Opus 2, 1797 dedicated 'a son ami (Rodolphe?) Kreutzer' for 'Violon, Alto et Basse':
    - E♭ major, op. 2 no. 1
      1. Allegro moderato
      2. Menuet
      3. Siciliane
      4. Finale: Allegro
    - G major, op. 2 no. 2
      1. Allegro
      2. Menuet
      3. Finale: Allegro
    - F major, op. 2 no. 3
      1. Allegro
      2. Menuet: Andante/ Trio: Allegro
      3. Adagio
      4. Rondeau: Allegro
- IMSLP also lists a set of three string trios, Opus 1a –First Published 1790, dedicated to 'Son ami Montbeillard' for the combination of 2 violins & bass.

=== Vocal ===
- Marche du siège de Lille (1792) for voice and piano (or harp)
- Romance à la lune (1796) for voice and piano (or harp)
- Le tombeau de Sophie (1796) for voice and harpsichord (or harp)
