= Antoine Favre (composer) =

French violinist and composer (c. 1670–1739)

- Born: c. 1670; France
- Died: c. 1739 (aged 68–69)
- Occupations: Violinst; composer
- Employer: Opéra National de Lyon
- Style: Classical

Antoine Favre (c. 1670 – c. 1739), sometimes written as Antoine Faure, was a French violinist and composer. The son of the Lyon violinist Durand Favre, both father and son joined the orchestra of the Opéra National de Lyon in 1687. As a composer, he is best known for his sonatas and minuets.
