= Calabrese =

Calabrese may refer to:

- Any person, thing or concept of or from Calabria, a region in southern Italy, including:
  - The various regional languages of Calabria

== In agriculture ==
- The Apulo-Calabrese breed of pig
- Calabrian wine
- Calabrese, an alternative name for the Italian wine grape Nero d'Avola
- Calabrese, an alternative name for the Italian wine grape Sangiovese
- Calabrese, an alternative name for the Italian wine grape Canaiolo
- Calabrese, a particular type of broccoli, in the United Kingdom
- The Calabrese horse

== Other uses ==
- Calabrese (surname)
- Calabresi (surname)
- Calabrese (band), American rock band

== See also ==
- Calabresella
- Calabrian (disambiguation)
- Calabro (disambiguation)
