= Reactions to the Mueller special counsel investigation =

Reactions to the Special Counsel investigation of any Russian government efforts to interfere in the 2016 presidential election have been widely varied and have evolved over time. An initial period of bipartisan support and praise for the selection of former FBI director Robert Mueller to lead the Special Counsel investigation gave way to some degree of partisan division over the scope of the investigation, the composition of the investigative teams, and its findings and conclusions.

While initially enjoying bipartisan support, the investigation quickly became the subject of criticism by Trump and his surrogates in the conservative media, with Sean Hannity eventually proposing it was part of a "deep state" conspiracy against Trump. A number of allegations were raised and almost immediately debunked, including misconduct by investigators, supposed unlawful wire-tapping of Trump Tower during the campaign, improper unmasking of Trump associates on intelligence intercepts, alleged abuse of Carter Page by the FISA court detailed in the Nunes memo, the alleged installation of a mole in the Trump campaign, and the FBI being denied access to DNC servers for forensic analysis purposes.

== Initial bipartisan support ==
Mueller's appointment to oversee the investigation immediately garnered widespread support from Democrats and from some Republicans in Congress. Senator Charles Schumer (D–NY) said, "Former Director Mueller is exactly the right kind of individual for this job. I now have significantly greater confidence that the investigation will follow the facts wherever they lead." Senator Dianne Feinstein (D–CA) stated, "Bob was a fine U.S. attorney, a great FBI director and there's no better person who could be asked to perform this function." She added, "He is respected, he is talented and he has the knowledge and ability to do the right thing." Rep. Jason Chaffetz (R–UT) tweeted that "Mueller is a great selection. Impeccable credentials. Should be widely accepted." Much Republican support in Congress was lukewarm: Rep. Peter T. King (R–NY) said "It's fine. I just don't think there is any need for it." Republican former Speaker of the House Newt Gingrich tweeted that Mueller is a "superb choice to be special counsel. His reputation is impeccable for honesty and integrity," but less than a month later he tweeted "Republicans are delusional if they think the special counsel is going to be fair."

Former United States Attorney Preet Bharara wrote of the team that "Bob Mueller is recruiting the smartest and most seasoned professionals who have a long track record of independence and excellence". Former special prosecutor Ken Starr, who had investigated Bill Clinton during the Clinton administration, said that the team was "a great, great team of complete professionals". Attorney George T. Conway III, husband of Counselor to the President Kellyanne Conway, wrote an article defending the constitutionality of the Mueller Investigation.

=== Conservative opposition ===
Some conservatives, including political commentators Laura Ingraham, Ann Coulter, and former House Speaker Newt Gingrich, stated that Mueller should be dismissed and the investigation closed. Christopher Ruddy, the founder of the right-leaning Newsmax, and a friend of Trump, stated that the president has considered firing Mueller.

Conservatives, especially Trump himself, have promoted a conspiracy theory claiming that, for example, that members of Mueller's team were "all Hillary Clinton supporters, some of them worked for Hillary Clinton" (PolitiFact rated this "Mostly False"). and that the investigation was the work of the "deep state".

== Opposition to the investigation ==
Throughout 2017 and 2018, Trump and his allies in Congress and the media promulgated a series of false narratives to assert that the FBI, Justice Department and Mueller investigation have been engaged in an elaborate, corrupt conspiracy against Trump. Among other things, Trump has characterized the Mueller investigation as a "rigged Russia witch hunt," while prominent Trump supporter Sean Hannity has described it as "the biggest corruption scandal in American history." On May 29, 2018, Trump went so far as to assert that the Mueller investigation intended to meddle in the 2018 midterm elections, an accusation Hannity reinforced on his Fox News show that night, saying Mueller "wants to derail many pro-Trump Republicans in the midterms." In a two-minute monologue that same day, Fox News anchorman Shepard Smith flatly debunked that assertion and a number of other Trump narratives, saying, "you laugh at them because there's almost nothing else you can do."

Amid concerns that Trump might attempt to halt the investigation by having Mueller dismissed, some members of Congress have supported a bipartisan bill designed to protect Mueller. Senate Majority Leader Mitch McConnell announced on April 17, 2018, that such a bill was not necessary and he would not allow it to come to the Senate floor for a vote. Nevertheless, the chairman of the Republican-controlled Senate Judiciary Committee Chuck Grassley announced on April 19, 2018, that his committee would vote on the measure the following week. The bill cleared the committee on April 26, with four Republicans joining all ten Democrats in a 14–7 vote, but McConnell repeated he would not bring the bill to the floor for a vote.

=== Administration actions against investigation ===
Trump reportedly asked White House Counsel Donald McGahn in April 2017 to call acting deputy attorney general Dana Boente—who was supervising the Russia probe at the time, before Mueller's appointment—and get him to persuade Comey to announce that Trump was not personally under investigation. McGahn made the call but failed to convince Boente that Comey should make the statement.

In June 2017, Trump reportedly tried to fire Mueller, according to several independent accounts published in January 2018. The reports said that Trump told McGahn to fire Mueller; that McGahn refused, saying that to do so would have a catastrophic effect on Trump's presidency; and that Trump then backed off. The New York Times reported that McGahn said he would resign rather than carry out the order, while CNN said McGahn did not directly threaten to resign, and Fox News said Trump was persuaded not to carry out the action by McGahn and other aides. The New York Times report said that Trump cited three conflicts of interest on Mueller's part to justify the dismissal: a years-old dispute over fees at Trump National Golf Club; the fact that Mueller had most recently worked for the law firm that previously represented Trump's son-in-law, Jared Kushner; and the fact that Mueller had been interviewed to return as FBI Director the day before he was appointed special counsel. According to CNN, another reason Trump wanted to fire Mueller was Trump's perception that Mueller was close friends with Comey, although others have described them as professional acquaintances from having simultaneously worked in the Justice Department during the George W. Bush presidency. In August 2017, Trump said he had never thought about firing Mueller, and by December 2017, he had denied it twice more; in that time period his lawyers and advisers also issued five similar denials. By January 2018, Trump and his surrogates had denied that he had considered firing Mueller a total of eight times. Trump dismissed the January 2018 The New York Times story as "fake news". McGahn was interviewed by Mueller's investigators on November 30, 2017.

Also, in June 2017, Trump reportedly instructed his aides to start a campaign for his administration and his Republican allies to discredit potential witnesses in the investigation, including FBI officials Andrew McCabe, Jim Rybicki, and James Baker. The three men had been identified by Comey as his confidants. The instruction was reported in January 2018 by Foreign Policy. Trump's lead attorney John Dowd disputed the accuracy of the report.

In early December 2017, Trump sought to fire Mueller, according to an April 2018 report in The New York Times, but stopped after learning the news reports he based his decision on were incorrect. In January 2018, CNN reported that Trump was unhappy with Deputy Attorney General Rod Rosenstein, who oversees the Mueller investigation. Trump reportedly talked about wanting to fire Rosenstein and proposed firing him, before being persuaded otherwise by his advisers.

In April 2018, following an FBI raid on the office and home of Trump's private attorney Michael Cohen, Trump, for the first time, spoke openly about firing Mueller, saying that "many people" had advised him to do so and "We'll see what happens." Under Department of Justice regulations, that authority can only be exercised by Rosenstein, the DOJ official in charge of the special counsel investigation, but White House Press Secretary Sarah Huckabee Sanders said that Trump believes he has the power to do it directly, although he is not currently acting to do so.

According to a Washington Post tally, by August 21 Trump had fired or threatened over half of the officials with leadership roles in the investigation. Speaking to Reuters on that date he said,“I can go in, and I could do whatever — I could run it if I want. But I decided to stay out. I’m totally allowed to be involved if I wanted to be. So far, I haven’t chosen to be involved.”

=== Donald Trump attacks on investigation ===
On March 17, 2018, Trump appeared to abandon his attorneys' advice to avoid directly criticizing the Mueller investigation, tweeting that the "Mueller probe should never have been started" and that it was a "WITCH HUNT!" He also claimed that "there was tremendous leaking, lying and corruption at the highest levels of the FBI, Justice & State." The next day, he questioned how "fair" it was that "the Mueller team have 13 hardened Democrats, some big Crooked Hillary supporters, and Zero Republicans". Trump did not note that Mueller himself is a Republican, as is the man who appointed him, Rod Rosenstein—who was appointed by Trump. This was the first time he had criticized Mueller by name, alarming many prominent Republicans, who cautioned Trump not to criticize Mueller or give any appearance that he was contemplating having Mueller dismissed; they warned of dire repercussions if he did. Presidential lawyer Ty Cobb later stated that the president "is not considering or discussing" firing Mueller.

Trump also said that the "witch hunt" that began "right after I won the nomination" is "an attack on our country in a true sense. It's an attack on what we all stand for." In May 2018, Trump tweeted that the special counsel probe, led by "13 Angry Democrats", was investigating him on "obstruction for a made up, phony crime". He declared that there was no obstruction, only him "fighting back". He maintained the "witch hunt" narrative throughout the Mueller investigation and into the 2019 impeachment inquiry.

In response to Mueller's death in March 2026, Trump wrote in a Truth Social post: "Good, I'm glad he's dead. He can no longer hurt innocent people!"

=== By Trump's lawyers and allies ===
On December 16, 2017, Kory Langhofer, a lawyer for Trump for America, sent a letter to Congress alleging that Mueller's team had unlawfully acquired, via the GSA, tens of thousands of emails sent and received by thirteen senior members of the Trump transition team. The communications derived from the official governmental presidential transition team domain, "ptt.gov". On the following day, GSA Deputy Counsel Lenny Loewentritt stated that Trump's transition team had been explicitly advised at the time of the transition that all material passing through government equipment would be subject to monitoring and auditing, and would not be held back from law enforcement officers. A spokesman for Mueller's investigation, Peter Carr, also rejected Langhofer's claims, stating that the Trump transition emails were acquired appropriately through the criminal investigation process.

On March 17, 2018, Trump's personal attorney, John Dowd, urged Rod Rosenstein to follow the "courageous example" of Sessions in dismissing Andrew McCabe and "bring an end" to the Mueller investigation. Dowd originally told the Daily Beast that he was speaking on behalf of the president, but later told CNN he was speaking only for himself. A source told CNN that Trump had not authorized the statement, but two sources told The New York Times that Dowd was speaking at Trump's urging.

During the week of March 19, 2018, Trump hired the law firm diGenova & Toensing, headed by Joseph diGenova and his wife and law partner Victoria Toensing. Both are longtime Republican activists, having appeared on Fox News on numerous occasions to criticize Democrats, most notably Bill and Hillary Clinton. In recent weeks diGenova has advanced the narrative that a "deep state" conspiracy is attempting to subvert Trump. In January 2018, diGenova said on Fox News, "There was a brazen plot to illegally exonerate Hillary Clinton and, if she didn't win the election, to then frame Donald Trump with a falsely created crime. Make no mistake about it: A group of FBI and DOJ people were trying to frame Donald Trump of a falsely created crime." Fox News reported that Toensing had recently represented Trump associates Mark Corallo, Sam Clovis, and Erik Prince, and that Corallo, Clovis, and Trump signed waivers of any potential conflicts of interest. The White House announced later that week that diGenova and Toensing would not be hired as part of the special counsel legal team, but might assist Trump in other legal matters. Trump attorney Jay Sekulow cited conflicts of interest, while two sources told The New York Times that Trump hadn't established personal rapport with diGenova and Toensing.

Several conservative sources sided with Trump to embrace and promote the Spygate conspiracy theory, including the Fox & Friends talk show and political commentators Tucker Carlson and Sean Hannity for Fox News, the website Breitbart, and also radio show host Rush Limbaugh. Meanwhile, Infowars host Alex Jones took credit for coining the "Spygate" term. Asked on whether the promotion of the "Spygate" theory is meant to discredit the special counsel investigation, Trump's attorney Rudy Giuliani said on May 27 that the investigators "are giving us the material to do it. Of course, we have to do it in defending the president ... it is for public opinion" on whether to "impeach or not impeach" Trump.

The New York Times reported on July 12, 2018, that the White House had ordered that classified information about informant Stephan Halper be given to all members of the House and Senate Intelligence Committees, beyond the tight access that had previously been granted to the Gang of Eight. The directors of national intelligence and the FBI both opposed the move. House Intelligence Committee chairman Devin Nunes, a staunch Trump ally, had requested the expanded access for weeks, while Democrats asserted it was an effort by Republicans to gain information they could use to undermine the Mueller investigation.

It was reported in early September that Trump's attorney Rudy Giuliani said that the White House could and likely would prevent the special counsel investigation from making public certain information in its final report which would be covered by executive privilege.

According to Giuliani, Trump's personal legal team is already preparing a "counter-report" to refute the special counsel investigation's report. In a series of tweets on December 7, 2018, President Trump publicly announced and acknowledged that his legal team will be producing a counter report to Mueller's Investigation after they release their final report. Trump also elaborated in that same tweet by stating that an article produced by The Atlantic was fake news due to the article proclaiming that the Trump Administration did not have a response to the Mueller investigation's findings..."That is Fake News. Already 87 pages done, but obviously cannot complete until we see the final Witch Hunt Report." Tt has been reported as early as July 2018 that a counter report was in the works.

=== By Congress ===
On July 26, 2017, Florida Representative Matt Gaetz introduced a congressional resolution calling for a special counsel investigation into the handling of the Hillary Clinton email controversy by James Comey, undue interference of Attorney General Loretta Lynch in that investigation, and the acquisition of Uranium One by the Russian state corporation Rosatom during Mueller's time as FBI director. Gaetz stated that he did not trust Mueller to lead the investigation because of his alleged involvement in approval of the Uranium One deal and his allegedly close relationship with Comey, a probable person of interest in the proposed investigation. The resolution was referred to two House committees where it has remained as of February 21, 2018.

On August 24, 2017, Rep. Ron DeSantis (R-Florida) added a rider to the proposed fiscal 2018 spending bill package that would block funding from being used "for the investigation under that order of matters occurring before June 2015" (the month Trump announced he was running for president) immediately and terminated funding for the special counsel investigation 180 days after passage of the bill. Rep. DeSantis said that the DOJ order of May 17, 2017, "didn't identify a crime to be investigated and practically invites a fishing expedition." House Republican leaders did not allow the amendment to proceed to the floor for a vote.

On November 3, 2017, Gaetz introduced another resolution demanding Mueller's resignation as special counsel due to conflicts of interest, this resolution was co-sponsored by U.S. Representative from Arizona Andy Biggs and U.S. Representative from Texas Louie Gohmert; Arizona Representative Trent Franks co-sponsored the resolution on November 8, 2017. The resolution was referred to the House Judiciary Committee where it has remained as of February 21, 2018. As a "sense of the House" resolution, its approval would not be legally binding upon Mueller.

On February 2, 2018, the House Intelligence Committee with Trump's authorization released a memo written by committee chair Devin Nunes and staff. The Nunes memo, based on classified information, alleged that the FBI and Department of Justice "may have relied on politically motivated or questionable sources" in October 2016 in seeking authorization for a wiretap on Carter Page, a former adviser to Trump's campaign. Before the memo's release, Trump told associates that it would discredit the investigation, and after its release, Trump claimed in a tweet that the memo "totally vindicates" him. On February 24, 2018, the House Intelligence Committee with Trump's authorization released a redacted version of a memo from Adam Schiff, ranking Democratic member of the committee, as a response to the Nunes memo. The response contended the wiretaps were properly obtained and were warranted because Page had been assessed by intelligence agencies as "an agent of the Russian government," adding that "Our extensive review of the initial FISA application and three subsequent renewals failed to uncover any evidence of illegal, unethical, or unprofessional behavior by law enforcement and instead revealed that both the FBI and DOJ made extensive showings to justify all four requests."

=== By others ===
The New York Times reported on March 28, 2018, that the Justice Department Inspector General Michael E. Horowitz would investigate accusations of wrongdoing surrounding the surveillance of former Trump campaign aide Carter Page, "amid a stream of attacks in recent months from the White House and Republican lawmakers seeking to undermine the special counsel's investigation." The announcement fell short of the demands of several Republican politicians and prominent Trump supporters such as Sean Hannity for the Justice Department to appoint a special counsel to investigate. CNN reported on March 29, 2018, that Attorney General Jeff Sessions had appointed John W. Huber, the United States Attorney for the District of Utah, to investigate this and other matters. In a letter to three Republican Congressional committee chairmen, Sessions said he would rely on Huber's findings to decide if a special counsel needed to be appointed. Huber had been investigating the matter for a time, but his involvement had not previously been disclosed. CNN reported that Huber is investigating "a cluster of Republican-driven accusations against the FBI," which includes allegations that the FBI acted inappropriately in two matters involving Hillary Clinton, including her emails and the sale of Uranium One to a Russian-owned company.

In Why Robert Mueller’s Appointment As Special Counsel Was Unlawful, Gary S. Lawson, the Philip S. Beck Professor of Law at Boston University School of Law, and Steven G. Calabresi, the Clayton J. and Henry R. Barber Professor of Law at Northwestern University Pritzker School of Law, argue that Mueller's appointment was "unlawful" for three reasons. First, the Department of Justice is not authorized to appoint create and appoint Special Counsel who "replace, rather than assist United States Attorneys." Second, the Special Counsel created would be a superior officer, not an inferior officer, and therefore must be appointed by the President and confirmed by the Senate. Third, even if the Special Counsel was an inferior officer, the Attorney General is not authorized to appoint a Special Counsel of this type unless Congress has given them the statutory authority to do so, which they had not.

== Support for the investigation ==
A majority of American people and news media outlets have supported the investigation onto ties between Donald Trump and his associates with Russia and its affiliates.

Media support from bipartisan, neutral and left-leaning outlets has maintained a consistent level of support for the investigation, even at times when it has been called into question, such as when opponents of the investigation accused it of bias when Peter Strzok was removed from Mueller's investigative team.

Many existing media outlets have devoted considerable time to informing their readers and viewers on the realtime evolution of the investigation, including CNN, devoting an entire website to the investigation, and The Washington Post. Many late night show hosts have taken to defending the investigation through their comedy routines, including Stephen Colbert, Trevor Noah, Samantha Bee, Seth Meyers and John Oliver.

Due to the sheer volume and complexity of information and regularity of revelations being made public, coupled with public activity by the Trump White House, various podcasts have been set up to devote their focus on the investigation, including Mueller, She Wrote, Mueller Time and Gaslit Nation. Others have taken a now tangential or parallel approach, such as Slow Burn, which retells the impeachments of presidents Richard Nixon and Bill Clinton, and draws parallels to the prospect of impeaching Donald Trump, and Rachel Maddow's Bag Men, which retells the criminal activity of vice president Spiro Agnew, and the parallels between his attacks on the federal prosecutors investigating him while Nixon was being investigated for conspiracy relating to the Watergate scandal.

On April 4, 2021, Rod Rosenstein was interviewed on Kim Wehle's podcast #SimplePolitics. Rosenstein pushed back on the idea that the investigation was a "witch hunt": "From my perspective, it was not a witch hunt. It was never a witch hunt. Bob Mueller doesn't do witch hunts," he said. "That was the criticism that came from the Right during the investigation, but I don't believe that's fair in the way the investigation was conducted."

== Post-report reactions ==
Following the release of Attorney General William Barr's summary of the findings of the completed special counsel investigation, Trump tweeted: "No Collusion, No Obstruction, Complete and Total EXONERATION." Barr had quoted the special counsel as writing that "while this report does not conclude that the President committed a crime, it also does not exonerate him" on whether he had committed obstruction of justice. However, since the special counsel did not reach a conclusion on obstruction of justice, the decision moves up to the Attorney General. Barr concluded: "After reviewing the Special Counsel's final report on these issues; consulting with Department officials, including the Office of Legal Counsel; and applying the principles of federal prosecution that guide our charging decisions, Deputy Attorney General Rod Rosenstein and I have concluded that the evidence developed during the Special Counsel's investigation is not sufficient to establish that the President committed an obstruction-of-justice offense."

== Polling ==
=== 2017 ===
A May 2017 Politico/Morning Consult poll showed that 81% of U.S. voters supported the special prosecutor's investigation. A June 2017 Associated Press–NORC Center for Public Affairs Research poll asked U.S. adults whether the special counsel investigation could be fair and impartial: 26% were "extremely confident" or "very confident"; 36% were "moderately confident" and 36% were "not very confident" or "not at all confident." The poll indicated that 68% of Americans were at least "moderately concerned" about inappropriate connections between the Trump campaign and the Russians.

A poll published in November 2017 by ABC News and The Washington Post found that 58% of Americans approved of Mueller's handling of his investigation, while 28% disapproved. It also indicated that half of Americans believed that President Trump was not co-operating with the investigation. A Quinnipiac poll published on November 15, 2017, suggested that 60% of Americans believed that Mueller's investigation was proceeding fairly, with 27% believing that it was not. The poll also found that 47% of respondents said that President Trump ought to be impeached if he were to dismiss Mueller.

A December poll by Associated Press–NORC indicated that four out of ten Americans believed that Trump had committed a crime in connection with Russia, with an additional three out of ten beyond that believing that he had acted unethically. It found that 62% of Democrats and 5% of Republicans believe that Trump acted illegally. It found that 68% of Americans believed that Trump was obstructing the investigation. 57% of respondents said that they were "extremely confident" or "moderately confident" that Mueller's investigation is fair.

In another December poll from The Hill, 54% of respondents believe Mueller has a conflict of interest due to his relationship with James Comey. The poll also found 36% agreed Trump and his allies are getting harsher treatment from the special counsel than Clinton and her allies did during the FBI investigation into her handling of classified material." The same poll found that 60 percent of voters say that "a comment to the FBI director that he should consider letting Flynn off the hook" is not enough to constitute obstruction of justice.

=== 2018 ===
A USA Today/Suffolk University poll released on February 26, 2018, showed that a 58% majority of registered voters say they have a lot or some trust in Mueller's investigation, while a 57% majority say they have little or no trust in Trump's denials. Further, 75% say they take the charges filed by Mueller seriously; most of them say they take them "very" seriously. That represents some shift in views over the past year. In a USA Today/Suffolk Poll in March 2017, 63% called it very or somewhat serious.

A CBS poll released in May 2018 found that a majority of Americans, 53%, believe the investigation is politically motivated, although most agreed it should continue. The poll indicated most Republicans believe that Congress should take steps to end the investigation, while most independents and nearly all Democrats feel the investigation should be allowed to continue.

== See also ==
- Special Counsel Independence and Integrity Act, a proposed law seeking to protect the investigation
- Russian espionage in the United States
- RT America, the American arm of the RT network
- Timeline of Russian interference in the 2016 United States elections
- Timeline of investigations into Trump and Russia (January–June 2017)
- Timeline of investigations into Trump and Russia (July–December 2017)
- Timeline of investigations into Trump and Russia (January–June 2018)
- Timeline of investigations into Trump and Russia (July–December 2018)
