= Joseph Dupont (violinist) =

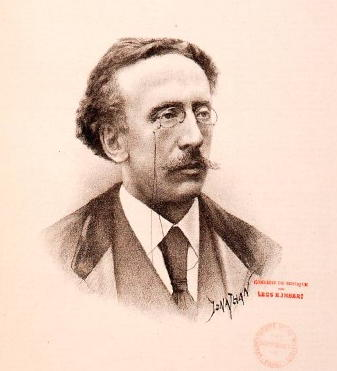
- Violinist & Conductor Joseph Dupont

Background information
- Born: 3 January 1838; Ensival, Verviers
- Died: 21 December 1899 (aged 61) Brussels
- Genres: Classical
- Occupations: violinist, leader, theatre director (manager) and conductor
- Instrument: Violin
- Years active: fl. ca. 1863–1889

Henri-Joseph Dupont (3 January 1838 – 21 December 1899) was a Belgian violinist, leader, theatre director (manager) and conductor. The pianist Auguste Dupont was his brother.

== Life ==
Dupont was born in Ensival, Verviers. He studied the violin at the Liège and Brussels conservatoires and won a Belgian Prix de Rome for composition in 1863. After a four-year study trip around Europe, he was made leader of the Warsaw Opera House in 1867 and of the Imperial Theatre of Moscow in 1871.

He returned to Brussels in 1872 and settled there as professor of harmony at the Conservatoire and leader of the orchestra at the Théâtre de la Monnaie. He also co-directed La Monnaie from 1886 to 1889 with Alexandre Lapissida, conducting performances starting from 1872/73 season, as well as often conducting the orchestra at London's Royal Opera House. A few months before his death in Brussels, he was made a member of the Académie royale de Belgique.

Preceded by Henry Verdhurdt	director of the Théâtre royal de la Monnaie; 1886–1889	Succeeded by Stoumon and Calabresi
