= Gary Lawson =

Gary Lawson may refer to:

- Gary Lawson (bowls) (born 1965), New Zealand lawn bowler
- Gary S. Lawson (born 1958), American lawyer
- Gary Lawson-Smith (born 1947), Australian rules footballer
