= Calabrese (surname) =

Calabrese is an Italian surname, meaning literally "Calabrian" or "from Calabria". Notable people with the surname:

- Anthony O. Calabrese (1907–1991), Democratic Party politician in Ohio
- Anthony O. Calabrese Jr. (fl. 1960s–2000s), son of the above and a judge and Republican Party politician in Ohio
- Edward Calabrese, American toxicologist
- Elizabeth Calabrese, New Jersey Democratic Party politician
- Frank Calabrese Sr. (1937–2012), Chicago mobster
- Gerald Calabrese (1925–2015), former college and professional basketball player and Democratic politician in New Jersey
- Giovanni Calabrese (born 1966), Italian rower and winner of a bronze medal in the 2000 Olympics
- Greg Calabrese, American soap opera actor
- John Calabrese, member of the Canadian band Danko Jones
- Karyn Calabrese (born 1947), American raw foodist and restaurateur
- Mike Calabrese, member of the band Lake Street Dive
- Salvatore Calabrese (1903–1973), Italian physician

== See also ==
- Calabrese (disambiguation)
