= Auguste Dupont =

Belgian pianist and composer (1827–1890)

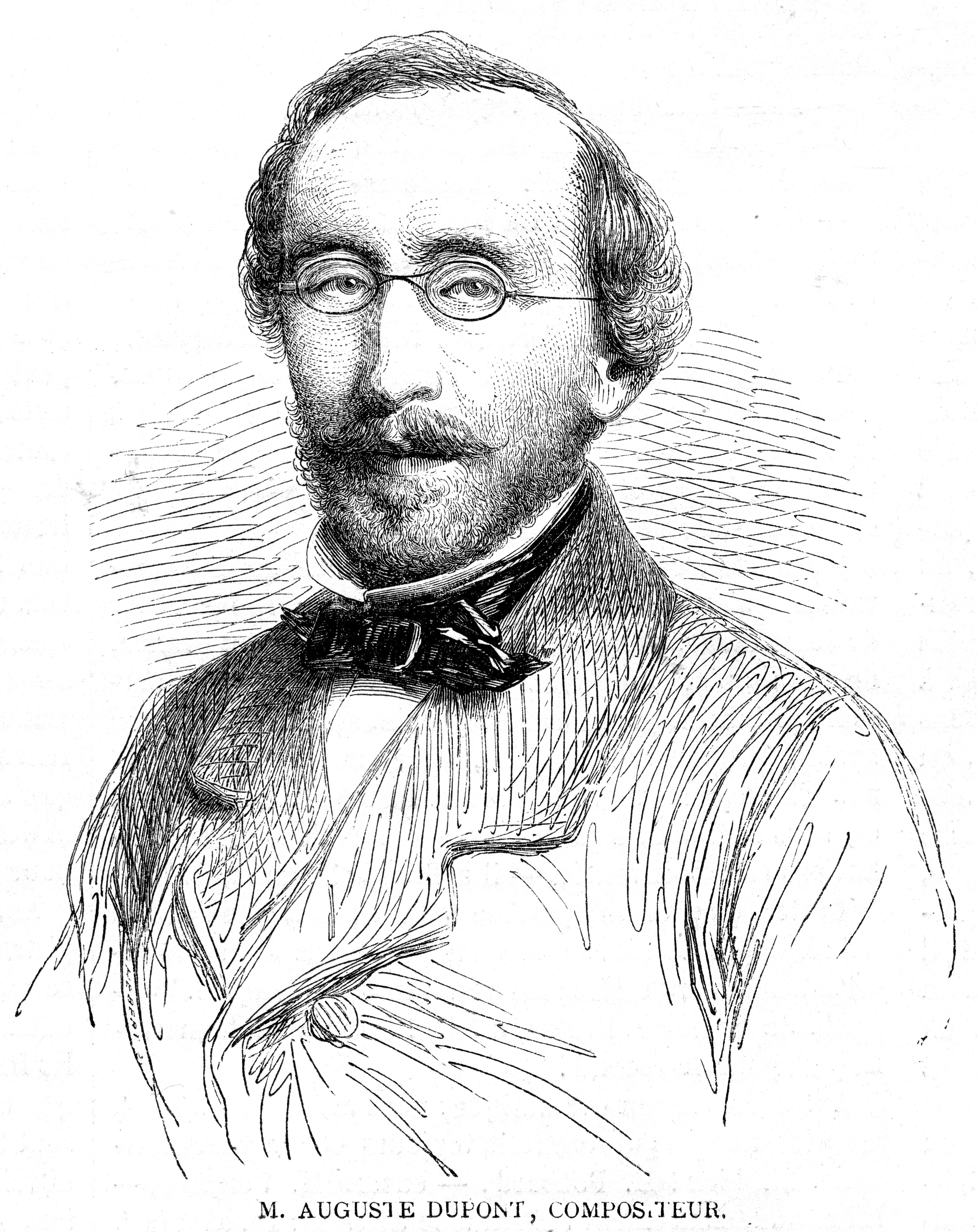
- Auguste Dupont (L'Illustration, 1862)
- Born: 9 February 1827; Ensival (Verviers)
- Died: 17 December 1890 (aged 63); Brussels
- Occupations: Pianist, composer

Auguste Dupont, full name Pierre-Auguste Dupont, (9 February 1827 - 17 December 1890) was a Belgian pianist and composer.

A laureate of the Royal Conservatory of Liège, where he was a student of Jules Jalheau, he travelled for a time as a musician in Germany, England and the Netherlands. While performing in Berlin, he was introduced to Giacomo Meyerbeer who gave him work for a time and who often mentions him in his diary. In 1850, he became a professor at the Royal Conservatory of Brussels. He composed several major pieces for concerts and pieces of chamber music. He was also the editor of the series École de piano du Conservatoire de Bruxelles, forty booklets of classical masterpieces. He became a teacher of chamber music in 1886.

His brother was the violinist and composer Joseph Dupont.

== Works ==
- Pluie de mai, Étude de trilles pour piano (Op.2)
- Grande Capriccio sur Robert le Diable
- Le Staccato Perpétuel (Op.31)
- Grande galop fantastique
- Contes du foyer (Op. 12)
- The Tickalicktoo Polka, Dedicated to the Esquimaux Family, Who Appeared Before Her Majesty at Windsor Castle, Feb. 3, 1854
- Morgane
- Suite en quintette
- Intermezzo - barcarolle
- Tocatelle pour piano (Op. 26)
- Chanson hongroise (Op. 27)
- Berceuse en la mineur pour piano (Op. 35)
- Trois Danses dans le style ancien (Op.37)
- Fantasie et Fugue (for the right hand)(Op.41)
- Roman en dix pages (Op. 48)
- Piano Concerto in F minor (Op. 49)
- La Pensée
- Morceaux Caractéristiques
- Feuille d'album : duettino pour piano et harpe ou 2 pianos (Op. 58)
- Valse expressive pour piano (Op. 60)

In 1862, L'Illustration p. 197, mentioned the following works:

- Poème d'amour, Sept chants lyriques [op. 54]
- Reminiscences Pastorales
- Rêveries sur l'eau
- Trio en sol mineur pour piano, violon et violoncelle (Op. 33)
- Grand quatuor
- Sonate
- Marche druïdique
- Une Chanson de jeune fille (Op.18)
- Chanson du feu
- Danse des ombres
- Danse des Almées

== Honours ==
- Chevalier de l'Ordre du Lion (1856).
