= Calabria (disambiguation) =

Calabria is a region located in Italy.

Calabria may also refer to:

== People ==
- Ann Marie Calabria, an American jurist on the North Carolina Court of Appeals
- Dante Calabria, an American former professional basketball player and coach
- Davide Calabria, an Italian professional footballer
- Ennio Calabria, an Italian painter
- Fulco Ruffo di Calabria, Italian noble and fighter pilot
- Mark A. Calabria, economist and U.S. government official

== Military ==
- Battle of Calabria, a naval battle between Italy and Britain during World War II
- 31 Infantry Division Calabria, an Italian infantry division of World War II

== Other uses ==
- "Calabria" (song), several versions of a house track originally by Danish producer Rune/Enur
  - "Destination Calabria", a mashup by Italian producer Alex Gaudino, based, in part, on the Rune track
- Calabria, ancient name of the Italian region now known as Salento

== See also ==
- Calabrian (disambiguation)
