= Alexandre Lapissida =

French theatre manager

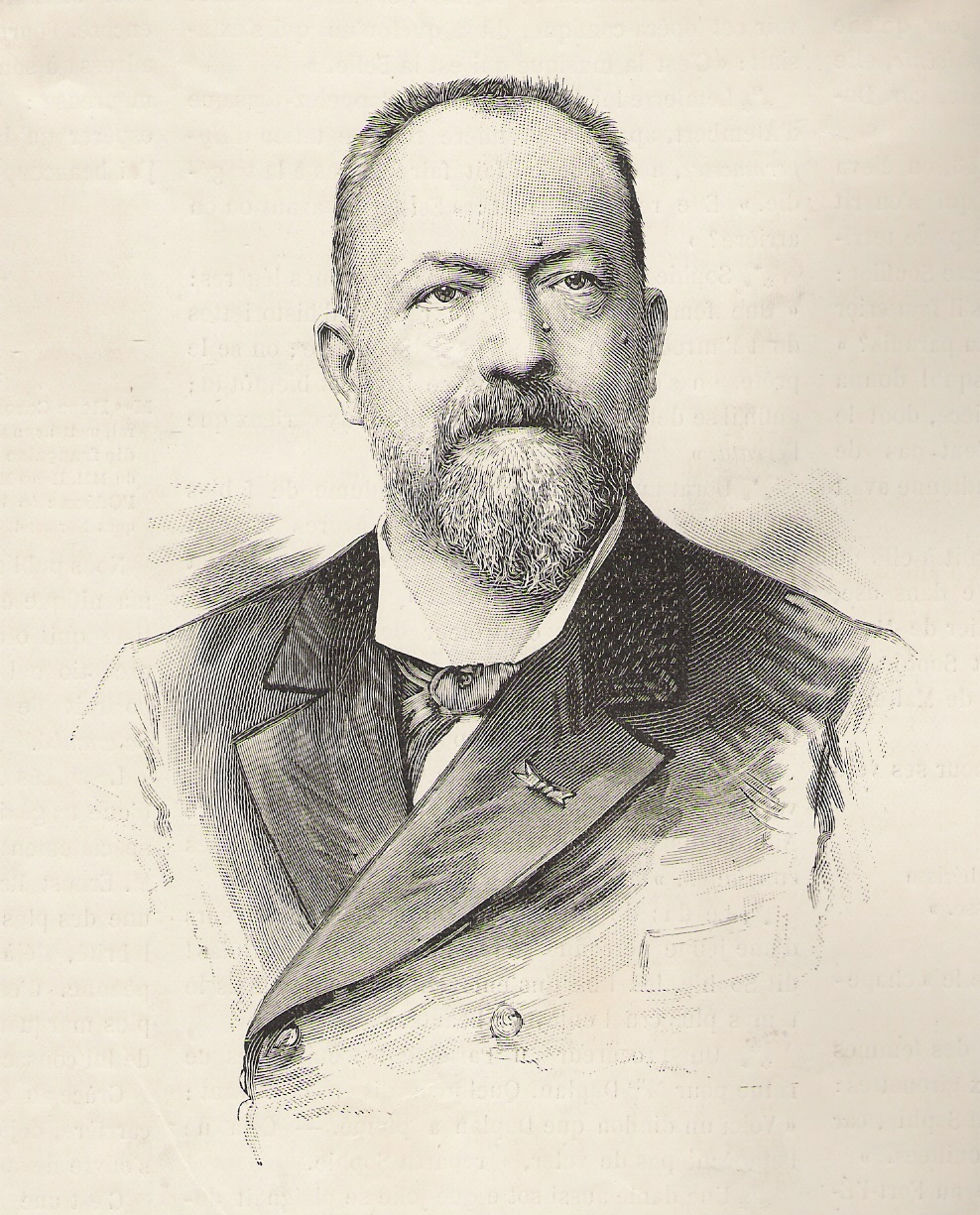
Alexandre Lapissida (1892)

Alexandre Lapissida (9 March 1839, Volkrange - 16 February 1907, Paris) was a French operatic tenor, producer, director and theatre manager.

== Life ==
First singing at Strasbourg, he was taken on by Théâtre de la Monnaie in Brussels in 1868, where he spent most of his career. There he was made a régisseur in 1871 and served as the theatre's joint head with violinist Joseph Dupont from 1886 to 1889. They then passed that position on to Stoumon and Calabresi. After that, Lapissida was taken on by the Opéra de Paris as régisseur général and producer. He produced the Opéra's main operas of the late 19th century including Le Mage by Jules Massenet (1891), Faust by Charles Gounod (1893), Salammbô by Ernest Reyer (1893), Otello by Giuseppe Verdi (1894), Frédégonde by Ernest Guiraud (1895), La favorite by Gaetano Donizetti (1896) and Les Huguenots by Giacomo Meyerbeer (1897). Lapissida seems to have left the stage by 1900.

Today, the Bibliothèque-musée de l'Opéra holds an important part of his correspondence in its "fonds Lapissida".

Preceded by Henry Verdhurdt	Director of Théâtre royal de la Monnaie; 1886-1889	Succeeded by Stoumon & Calabresi
