= Calabresi =

Calabresi is an Italian surname (meaning "Calabrese, Calabrian, from Calabria", plural masculine). Notable people with the surname include:

- Enrica Calabresi (1891–1944), Italian zoologist, herpetologist, and entomologist
- Guido Calabresi (born 1932), Italian American legal scholar and judge
- Luigi Calabresi (1937–1972), Italian police officer
- Peter Calabresi (born 1962), American neurologist
- Steven Calabresi (born 1958), American lawyer

== See also ==
- Calabrese (surname)
- Calabresella
- Calabrian (disambiguation)
