= Oscar Stoumon =

Belgian composer, music critic, playwright, theatre director

Oscar Stoumon (also spelled Stoumont) (20 August 1835 – 20 August 1900) was a Belgian composer, music critic, playwright and theatre director.

Stoumon was born in Liège. He composed music for ballets, taught at the Conservatoire royal de Bruxelles and co-headed the Théâtre de la Monnaie with Calabresi (1875–85 and 1889–1900). He died in Brussels.

== Works ==
- Phœbé, one-act opéra-comique (Brussels, Théâtre royal de la Monnaie, 19 January 1860)
- Endymion, one-act ballet (Brussels, Monnaie, 21 April 1861)
- La Ferme, one-act opéra-comique (Liège, 10 April 1862)
- L'Orco, two-act and three-scene opéra fantastique (Brussels, Monnaie, 8 January 1864)
- La Reine des prairies, two-act ballet (Brussels, Monnaie, 24 November 1865)
- La Fée amoureuse, two-act ballet (Brussels, Monnaie, 5 December 1867)
- Les Fumeurs d'opium, one-act operetta (Brussels, Théâtre royal des Galeries, 9 January 1869)
- Les Belles de nuit, one-act ballet (Brussels, Monnaie, 16 March 1870)
- La Sonate pathétique, one-act comedy (Brussels, Monnaie, 7 November 1870)
- Un fil à la patte, one-act comedy (Brussels, Galeries, 11 April 1871)
- Les Hannetons, one-act opéra-bouffe (Brussels, Galeries, 22 April 1871)
- Une grève, three-act comedy (Brussels, Galeries, 30 September 1871)
- Une nuit d'hiver, one-act comedy (Brussels, Galeries, 23 March 1872)
- L'Échéance, three-act comedy (Brussels, Galeries, 25 January 1873)
- Les Enfarinés, one-act comedy (Brussels, Galeries, 17 January 1874)
- La Moisson, one-act ballet (Brussels, Monnaie, 29 January 1875)
- La Nuit de Noël, one-act ballet (Brussels, Monnaie, 14 October 1880)
- Les Sorrentines, one-act ballet (Brussels, Monnaie, 11 October 1882)
- La Tzigane, one-act ballet (Brussels, Monnaie, 27 March 1885)
- Farfalla, one-act ballet (Brussels, Monnaie, 14 November 1893)

Preceded by Campocasso	director of Théâtre royal de la Monnaie; 1875-1885	Succeeded by Henry Verdhurdt
Preceded by Joseph Dupont & Alexandre Lapissida	director of Théâtre royal de la Monnaie; 1889-1900	Succeeded by Maurice Kufferath
