= Calabro =

Calabro may refer to:

- Calabro (surname)

== Places ==
- Aiello Calabro
- Belmonte Calabro
- Campo Calabro
- Corigliano Calabro
- Monterosso Calabro
- Morano Calabro
- Paterno Calabro
- San Costantino Calabro
- Soriano Calabro
