= Federalist Society =

American conservative legal organization

- Society logo featuring a silhouette of James Madison
- Formation: April 23, 1982; 44 years ago
- Founded at: University of Chicago
- Legal status: 501(c)(3) nonprofit
- Purpose: Legal advocacy
- Professional title: Federalist Society for Law and Public Policy Studies
- Location(s): 1776 I Street, NW; Washington, D.C. 20066, United States
- Coordinates: 38.901°N 77.041°W
- Members: ≈90,000 (2025)
- President & CEO: Sheldon Gilbert
- Budget: Revenue: $22.5 million Expenses: $27.7 million (FYE September 2024)
- Staff: 61 (2023)
- Website: fedsoc.org

The Federalist Society for Law and Public Policy Studies (FedSoc) is an American conservative and libertarian legal organization that advocates for a textualist and originalist interpretation of the United States Constitution. Headquartered in Washington, D.C., it has chapters at every U.S. law school and features student, lawyer, and faculty divisions; the lawyers division comprises more than 70,000 practicing attorneys in ninety cities. Through speaking events, lectures, and other activities, it provides a forum for members of the legal profession, the judiciary, and the legal academy. It is one of the most influential legal organizations in the United States.

The Federalist Society was founded in 1982 by a group of students from Yale Law School, Harvard Law School, and the University of Chicago Law School with the aim of challenging liberal or left-wing ideology within elite American law schools and universities. The organization's stated objectives are "checking federal power, protecting individual liberty and interpreting the Constitution according to its original meaning", and it plays a central role in networking and mentoring young conservative lawyers. It vetted President Donald Trump's list of potential U.S. Supreme Court nominees; in March 2020, 43 out of 51 of Trump's appellate court nominees were current or former members of the society.

Of the current nine members of the Supreme Court of the United States, at least five are current or former members of the organization—Brett Kavanaugh, Neil Gorsuch, Clarence Thomas, Samuel Alito, and Amy Coney Barrett. Chief Justice John Roberts previously served as a member of the steering committee of the Washington, D.C., chapter, but denies ever being a member.

== Founding ==
Founded in 1982 by students at Yale Law School, Harvard Law School, and the University of Chicago Law School, the Federalist Society began as a student organization which sought to challenge liberal ideology in American law schools. The group's first activity was a three-day symposium titled "A Symposium on Federalism: Legal and Political Ramifications" held at Yale in April 1982. The symposium, which was attended by 200 people, was organized by Steven G. Calabresi, Lee Liberman Otis, and David M. McIntosh; it included speakers such as Antonin Scalia, Robert Bork, and Theodore Olson.

In 2018, Politico Magazine wrote that "it is no exaggeration to suggest that it was perhaps the most effective student conference ever—a blueprint, in retrospect, for how to marry youthful enthusiasm with intellectual oomph to achieve far-reaching results." The society states that it "is founded on the principles that the state exists to preserve freedom, that the separation of governmental powers is central to our constitution, and that it is emphatically the province and duty of the judiciary to say what the law is, not what it should be."

== Background ==
The society looks to Federalist Paper Number 78 for an articulation of the virtue of judicial restraint, as written by Alexander Hamilton:

"It can be of no weight to say that the courts, on the pretense of a repugnancy, may substitute their own pleasure to the constitutional intentions of the legislature ... The courts must declare the sense of the law; and if they should be disposed to exercise WILL instead of JUDGMENT, the consequence would equally be the substitution of their pleasure to that of the legislative body."

Its logo is a silhouette of former President and Constitution author James Madison, who co-wrote The Federalist Papers. Commissioner Paul S. Atkins of the U.S. Securities and Exchange Commission considered society members "the heirs of James Madison's legacy" in a speech he gave in January 2008 to its lawyers chapter in Dallas, Texas. Madison is generally credited as the father of the Constitution and became the fourth President of the United States.

The society's name is said to have been based on the eighteenth-century Federalist Party; however, James Madison associated with Thomas Jefferson and the Democratic-Republican Party in opposition to Federalist Party policies borne from a loose interpretation of the Commerce Clause. The society's views are more closely associated with the general meaning of Federalism (particularly the New Federalism) and the content of the Federalist Papers than with the later Federalist Party.

The society's initial 1982 conference was funded, at a cost of $25,000, by the Institute for Educational Affairs. Later funding of $5.5 million came from the John M. Olin Foundation. Other early donors included the Scaife Foundation, the Bradley Foundation and the Koch family foundations. Donors to the Federalist Society have included Google, Chevron, Charles G. and David H. Koch; the family foundation of Richard Mellon Scaife; and the Mercer family. By 2017, the Federalist Society had $20 million in annual revenue.

The society holds a national lawyers convention each year in Washington, D.C. It is one of the highest profile conservative legal events of the year. Speakers have included former ACLU head Nadine Strossen, business executive and 2016 Republican presidential candidate Carly Fiorina, former BB&T chairman John Allison, former Attorney General Michael Mukasey, U.S. Senator Mike Lee, and White House Counsel under President Barack Obama Neil Eggleston. The Federalist Society invites to its events "capable liberal advocates to try to rebut conservative perspectives."

The Harvard Journal of Law and Public Policy is the Federalist Society's official journal, and a subscription is provided to members.

The Federalist Society is a client of the public relations firm Creative Response Concepts.

== Methods and influence ==
The Federalist Society has student chapters at every law school in the United States as well as lawyers chapters in 90 U.S. cities. The Federalist Society provides its 70,000 members with "intellectual sparring and professional grooming." David Montgomery, writing in The Washington Post Magazine, said that each individual member of the group is "akin to an excited synapse in a sprawling hive mind with no one actually in charge." Montgomery called the Federalist Society "a remarkably successful example of what political scientists call a 'political epistemic community'," echoing Amanda Hollis-Brusky, who described the Federalist Society as "an interconnected network of experts with policy-relevant knowledge who share certain beliefs and work to actively transmit and translate those beliefs into policy." Hollis-Brusky wrote that the Federalist Society "has evolved into the de facto gatekeeper for right-of-center lawyers aspiring to government jobs and federal judgeships under Republican presidents." Former Federalist Society executive vice president Leonard Leo has said "he endorses the network theory of the society," saying, "It's less about who gets what job and more about building a community that can be self-perpetuating and self-sustaining and self-driving."

Steven Teles, a professor of political science at Johns Hopkins University and the author of The Rise of the Conservative Legal Movement: The Battle for Control of the Law, wrote that the Federalist Society's influence on the judicial selection process may not be the group's most important impact. Instead, the "supply-and-demand relationship between the judges and the network" may be paramount, with judges needing "scholarship and arguments extending Federalist principles into new areas. Where new legal theories depart from the status quo, they need them to be vetted and legitimized through public debate. They require targeted cases raising questions that provide an opening to move the law. Without professors and lawyers in the network filling that demand, you're not going to maximize what you got through the electoral process." According to professor Lawrence Baum, the administrations of Ronald Reagan and George W. Bush "aimed to nominate conservative judges, and membership in the Federalist Society was a proxy for adherence to conservative ideology."

The Washington Post Magazine wrote that the Federalist Society "provides the enduring climate within which storms on the right come and go" and that "Much of the Federalist Society's influence comes not from its very public Washington victories but from its behind-the-scenes, grass-roots ability to shift the law at the idea level, even the cultural level." The Federalist Society lobbies for no particular policies, it does not sign amicus briefs, and it does not represent clients in cases. Amanda Hollis-Brusky, political science associate professor at Pomona College, and Calvin TerBeek, Ph.D. candidate in political science at the University of Chicago, dispute that the Federalist Society is non-partisan, pointing to documents written by the Federalist Society to donors in 1984 where the organization states that one of its missions is pushing conservative positions. In rebuttal to Hollis-Brusky and TerBeek, former Solicitor General Ted Olson also wrote in Politico Magazine pointing out that in 37 years of its existence never "has the Federalist Society filed a lawsuit or brief in any litigation, and never once during that period has it passed any resolution advocating for or against any legal issue."

In 2018, Politico Magazine wrote that "the organization had markedly and undeniably changed the nature of the judiciary." The Federalist Society has been described as influential during the presidencies of George H. W. Bush, George W. Bush and Donald Trump.

The American Constitution Society, founded in 2001, was explicitly started as a liberal analogue to the Federalist Society.

In January 2020, the Committee on Codes of Conduct of the Judicial Conference of the United States circulated a proposed advisory opinion that would bar membership in the Federalist Society or the American Constitution Society for members of the judiciary. The proposed opinion would continue to allow membership in the American Bar Association (ABA). The proposed restriction is limited to membership, and judges would still be allowed to participate in events hosted by organizations such as the Federalist Society and the American Constitution Society through speaking engagements, panel discussions, and event attendance. The proposed advisory opinion had a 120-day comment stage ending on May 20, 2020.

The Federalist Society has a Regulatory Transparency Project (RTP), whose goal, according to National Review, is to "foster a nationwide conversation about areas where the costs of regulation exceed any benefits." The RTP includes twelve working groups who analyze government regulations in different policy and legal areas. The project's methods include issuing white papers and holding events.

The Federalist Society's 2024 annual gala, which took place shortly after Donald Trump's election to a second presidential term, featured a conversation between Neil Gorsuch and Stephen Breyer. The two jurists conveyed a joint message that the Supreme Court is a collegial body whose independence must be protected.

== Judicial philosophy ==
According to The Washington Post Magazine, "Many individual Federalists are political and ideological warriors, though never in the name of the Federalist Society. Rather, society events provide the proving ground where they hone their arguments, seize a chance to shine and come to the attention of mentors higher up in the political-legal hierarchy. In that sense, the Federalist Society is a talent network and placement agency as well."

A 2008 study found that Federalist Society members appointed by Republican administrations to the U.S. Courts of Appeals had more conservative voting records than non-members. Critics say the organization favors judicial activism, in particular on social issues. Many members of the Federalist Society favored overturning Roe v. Wade, the Supreme Court ruling that permitted abortion, prior to its overturning in 2022. The organization tends to favor judges who take conservative stances on abortion rights and other social issues. Members of the Federalist Society have presented oral arguments in every single abortion case that has been before the Supreme Court since 1992.

According to the authors of Building Coalitions, Making Policy: The Politics of the Clinton, Bush, and Obama Presidencies (2012), "Federalist Society members declaim the notion that they are united around a particular philosophy," although many members have been associated with textualist or originalist methods of constitutional interpretation. Judicial restraint tends to align with conservative views on abortion and LGBT rights, while "Critics point out that conservatives are typically not so intent on following 'original meaning' in areas such as affirmative action, executive powers, free speech and federalism." Liberals have questioned "how suspiciously convenient it is that the jurisprudence advocated by society members so often yields conservative results." Leonard Leo, former executive vice president of the Federalist Society, "disputes the notion that the Constitution contains either conservative or progressive values, and he denies that originalism is rigged to reach conservative and libertarian results." He told The Washington Post Magazine, "You're practicing originalism appropriately when you're doing so without looking behind the curtain and trying to predetermine results" and that "There are liberals who work really hard at trying to develop a neutral, originalist approach to interpretation...The fact that people may come out differently occasionally—that's okay. Half the battle is just agreeing that it is essential." Increasingly, according to the magazine, "A number of liberal scholars have applied themselves to the task of showing how, in fact, originalist approaches can yield progressive results. As this train of thought has flowed out of the academy, liberal originalist logic is, more and more, showing up in legal briefs and even in Supreme Court dissents."

== Legal activities of members ==
Members of the Federalist Society have opposed regulation of private property and private businesses, and have argued that specific regulations must be enacted by legislatures rather than courts or executives that interpret existing statutes and powers.

=== Parents Involved in Community Schools v. Seattle School District No. 1 ===
Members of the Federalist Society have argued that courts should not take race into account when making decisions. For example, members of the group have argued that civil rights cases involving racially discriminatory policies should not consider race, but rather the individuals involved. Federalist Society members were extensively involved with the Parents Involved in Community Schools v. Seattle School District No. 1 ruling where the Supreme Court struck down voluntary desegregation plans in several jurisdictions. The authors of The Federalist Society: How Conservatives Took the Law Back from Liberals write that "Conservatives believe, however, that it is not appropriate for the government to promote racial balance. The essence of the conservative position is that there is no legal difference between considering race or gender for purposes of exclusion and considering race or gender for purposes of inclusion. They argue that both are harmful and make racial problems worse. On the other hand, many civil rights advocates believe that because our history has been one of the systematic exclusion of racial minorities and women from social, political, and economic institutions and from positions of power and influence, the conservative view leads to the continuation of exclusion and retards society's ability to move toward inclusion."

=== District of Columbia v. Heller ===
Members of the Federalist Society have forcefully argued against regulations on guns. Members hold that the Second Amendment protects the rights of individuals to guns, as opposed to being a collective right to arms. At the time of the Federalist Society's creation and since the 19th century, the Supreme Court and academics had held a more restrictive view of gun rights. The Federalist Society was influential in shifting legal views on gun rights, culminating in the Supreme Court ruling District of Columbia v. Heller which struck down gun regulations in the District of Columbia that required guns to be kept "unloaded and disassembled or bound by a trigger lock".

=== Citizens United v. FEC ===
The Federalist Society had a significant influence on the Citizens United Supreme Court ruling which weakened regulations on campaign finance by finding that the free speech clause of the First Amendment to the Constitution prohibits the government from restricting independent expenditures for communications by nonprofit corporations, for-profit corporations, labor unions, and other associations.

=== National Federation of Independent Business v. Sebelius ===
The ideas of the Federalist Society were "at the intellectual heart" of National Federation of Independent Business v. Sebelius, which challenged the constitutionality of the Affordable Care Act (ACA), with members of the group playing a "mostly behind-the-scenes part in NFIB—and in many of the most significant conservative legal victories of the last 30 years." In her book on the history of the Federalist Society, political scientist Amanda Hollis-Brusky writes that "Federalist Society members had been invested in the litigation efforts against the ACA well before the Act was signed into law—before there was even anything concrete to litigate against."

Libertarian law professor Randy Barnett attended his first Federalist Society event in 1986 and found the group "open to testing a diversity of ideas". He became a "leading voice of the growing libertarian wing of the Federalist Society, and he became one of the architects of constitutional claims at the core of lawsuits against the health-care plan." His participation in the legal challenge to the ACA was initiated at the Federalist Society's 2009 national convention, well before the ACA's passage in 2010. He co-authored a 16-page legal memorandum "that outlined a constitutional case against the health-care measure." The memorandum "became a source of talking points during congressional debate and laid the framework for subsequent court challenges; Barnett represented one of the plaintiffs." Barnett said the Federalist Society "involves people, gets them interested, and they oftentimes will do something about that."

== Role in presidencies ==
=== George W. Bush administration (2001–09) ===
Legal positions in the George W. Bush administration were overwhelmingly staffed with Federalist Society members. Approximately half of Bush's nominees for appellate court judgeships were Federalist Society members. The Bush administration was harshly criticized for the decision to nominate Harriet Miers to the Supreme Court, with conservative critics arguing that she lacked a consistently conservative track record, did not have Federalist Society "credentials", and for her purported ties to the ABA (American Bar Association), which conservatives considered to be a liberal organization. After conservative outcry, Miers withdrew her nomination. The Bush administration went on to nominate Samuel Alito, a Federalist Society member with a consistent conservative track record who was active in Federalist Society circles, to the Supreme Court.

Members of the society helped to encourage Bush's decision to terminate a nearly half-century-old practice of giving the ABA confidential early access to judicial nominees, allowing the ABA to rate nominee's qualifications for office before the nominations were announced. Since the administration of President Dwight D. Eisenhower, the ABA provided the service to presidents of both parties and the nation by vetting the qualifications of those under consideration for lifetime appointment to the federal judiciary before any other group. The society alleged that the bar association showed a liberal bias in its recommendations. Examples given included that while former Supreme Court clerks nominated to the Court of Appeals by Democrats had an average rating of slightly below "well qualified", similar Republican nominees were rated on average as only "qualified/well qualified." In addition the bar association gave Ronald Reagan's judicial nominees Richard Posner and Frank H. Easterbrook its lowest possible ratings of "qualified/not qualified", and Judges Posner and Easterbrook have gone on to become the two most highly cited judges in the federal appellate judiciary.

=== Donald Trump's first administration (2017–21) ===
According to Politico Magazine, Trump became president "for a long list of reasons, of course, but near the top of that list is the imprimatur the Federalist Society granted him. He almost certainly couldn't have gotten what he wanted without the Federalists. And they almost certainly couldn't have gotten what they wanted without him." During the 2016 presidential campaign, Texas Senator Ted Cruz "accused Trump of not being a true conservative" and warned Republicans that Trump would nominate liberal judges. While consulting with conservative think tank The Heritage Foundation to create a list of nominees, Trump stated: "I'm going to submit a list of justices, potential justices of the United States Supreme Court, that I will appoint from the list. I won't go beyond that list."

The Federalist Society was influential in the Trump administration, hand-selecting Supreme Court Justice Neil Gorsuch and recruiting a slate of conservative judges to fill vacancies throughout the federal judiciary. The society helped to assemble the list of 21 people from which Trump said he would choose a nominee to replace Antonin Scalia on the U.S. Supreme Court. Nine of the 21 individuals spoke at the society's annual convention in late November 2016, while nearly all of the others were in attendance. Federalist Society members generally chose not to criticize Trump, and Politico described the Federalist Society membership as "elite, conservative lawyers who have generally chosen to give Trump a pass on his breaches of long-cherished legal norms and traditions in exchange for the gift of Supreme Court Justice Neil Gorsuch." Former Federalist Society executive vice president Leonard Leo said: "What President Trump has done with judicial selection and appointments is probably at the very center of his legacy, and may well be his greatest accomplishments thus far."

In May 2018, the Federalist Society hosted a phone call entitled "examining the legality of the Mueller Investigation", where one of the featured speakers argued that Special Counsel Robert Mueller's investigation into Russian interference in the 2016 election was unconstitutional.

In January 2019, The Washington Post wrote that the Federalist Society had reached an "unprecedented peak of power and influence." Politico wrote that the Federalist Society "has become one of the most influential legal organizations in history—not only shaping law students' thinking but changing American society itself by deliberately, diligently shifting the country's judiciary to the right." In 2020, former vice president of the Federalist Society, Leonard Leo, became co-chair of the organization.

In January 2021, some members of the Federalist Society, such as Jeremy Rosen, an appellate lawyer in Los Angeles, argued that members who assisted Trump in the spreading of false claims of election fraud during the 2020 U.S. presidential election should be "distanced from the conservative group." Specific members mentioned for possible removal included John Eastman, chair of the Federalist Society's federalism and separation of powers practice group, who made claims about election fraud at a Trump rally on January 6, 2021—the day of the Capitol attack. Others mentioned included Texas Senator Ted Cruz and Missouri Senator Josh Hawley, who voted against the certification of election results.

== Notable members ==
=== Current officeholders ===
- Chief Justice of the United States John Roberts (disputed) (Note: Roberts was at one point reported to have been a member of the society, but Roberts's membership status was never definitively established. Deputy White House press secretary Dana Perino said Roberts "has no recollection of ever being a member." Following the report, the Washington Post located the Federalist Society Lawyers Division Leadership Directory, 1997–1998, which listed Roberts as a member of the Washington chapter steering committee; however, membership in the society is not a necessary condition for being listed in its leadership directory.)
- Supreme Court Justice Samuel Alito
- Supreme Court Justice Clarence Thomas
- Supreme Court Justice Neil Gorsuch
- Supreme Court Justice Brett Kavanaugh
- Supreme Court Justice Amy Coney Barrett
- United States Court of Appeals Judge (D.C. Cir.) Gregory G. Katsas
- United States Court of Appeals Judge (D.C. Cir.) Neomi Rao
- United States Court of Appeals Judge (D.C. Cir.) Justin R. Walker
- United States Court of Appeals Judge (2nd Cir.) Michael H. Park
- United States Court of Appeals Judge (7th Cir.) Michael B. Brennan
- United States Court of Appeals Judge (8th Cir.) David Stras
- United States Court of Appeals Judge (9th Cir.) Mark J. Bennett
- United States Court of Appeals Judge (9th Cir.) Ryan D. Nelson
- United States Court of Appeals Judge (9th Cir.) Kenneth K. Lee
- United States Court of Appeals Judge (9th Cir.) Daniel Bress
- United States Court of Appeals Judge (9th Cir.) Danielle J. Forrest
- United States Court of Appeals Judge (9th Cir.) Patrick J. Bumatay
- United States Court of Appeals Judge (9th Cir.) Lawrence VanDyke
- United States Court of Appeals Judge (9th Cir.) Anthony Johnstone
- United States Court of Appeals Judge (10th Cir.) Allison Eid
- United States Court of Appeals Judge (11th Cir.) Kevin Newsom
- United States Court of Appeals Judge (11th Cir.) Elizabeth L. Branch
- United States Court of Appeals Judge (11th Cir.) Britt Grant
- United States Court of Appeals Judge (11th Cir.) Robert Luck
- United States Court of Appeals Judge (11th Cir.) Barbara Lagoa
- United States Court of Appeals Judge (11th Cir.) Andrew L. Brasher
- United States Court of Appeals Senior Judge (5th Cir.) Edith Brown Clement
- United States District Court for the Southern District of Florida Judge Roy Altman
- United States District Court for the Northern District of Texas Judge Ada Brown
- United States District Court for the Southern District of Florida Judge Aileen Cannon
- Senator Ted Cruz, Republican Senator of Texas
- Senator Josh Hawley, Republican Senator of Missouri
- Senator Todd Young, Republican Senator of Indiana
- Florida Supreme Court Justice Meredith Sasso

=== Former officeholders ===
- Supreme Court Justice Antonin Scalia (who served as the original faculty advisor to the organization)
- United States Attorney General Edwin Meese
- U.S. Attorney General John Ashcroft
- United States Assistant Attorney General Peter Keisler, a co-founder of the Federalist Society
- United States Solicitor General Theodore Olson
- United States Solicitor General Paul Clement
- FBI Director Christopher A. Wray
- President Pro Tempore of the U.S. Senate Orrin Hatch
- Professor Michael W. McConnell at Stanford Law School and former United States Court of Appeals Judge (10th Cir.)
- U.S. Senator and Secretary of Energy Spencer Abraham
- United States Ambassador to the European Union C. Boyden Gray
- United States Secretary of the Interior Gale Norton
- United States Secretary of Homeland Security Michael Chertoff
- General counsel of the Office of Management and Budget and of the Department of Homeland Security Philip Perry
- Texas State Representative and Dallas lawyer Bill Keffer
- United States Secretary of Labor Eugene Scalia
- Assistant Attorney General for the Environment and Natural Resources Division and former acting head of the Civil Division of the Department of Justice Jeffrey Clark
- United States Court of Appeals Chief Judge (9th Cir.) Alex Kozinski
- United States Court of Appeals Judge (9th Cir.) Sandra Segal Ikuta
- United States Court of Appeals Judge (D.C. Cir.) Robert Bork
- United States Court of Appeals Judge (D.C. Cir.) Thomas Griffith
- Acting U.S. Attorney for the Southern District of New York Danielle Sassoon

=== Academia ===
- Former President of Baylor University and former independent counsel Kenneth Starr
- Former Columbia Law School Dean David Schizer
- Professor Gary S. Lawson of Boston University School of Law
- Professor Richard Epstein of the New York University School of Law
- Professor William Baude of the University of Chicago Law School
- Professor Randy Barnett of Georgetown University Law Center
- Roger Pilon, Director of Constitutional Studies at the Cato Institute
- Former Dean of Chapman University School of Law John C. Eastman

== See also ==
- American Constitution Society
- Alliance for Justice
- Pacific Legal Foundation
- Brennan Center for Justice
- National Lawyers Guild
- American Bar Association
