= Maurice Kufferath =

Belgian conductor, musicologist, music critic and librettist

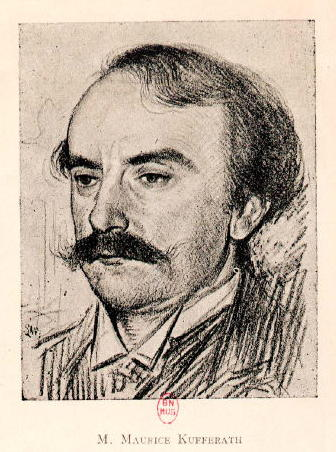

Maurice Kufferath (8 January 1852 – 8 December 1919) was a Belgian music critic, librettist, cellist and conductor. A director of the Théâtre de la Monnaie in Brussels from 1900 to 1919, he was considered an icon of the music scene in Belgium.

== Biography ==
Kufferath was born in Saint-Josse-ten-Noode and raised in a musical environment that saw him form a quartet with his brothers and his father, also a pianist. After studies in Brussels, he studied law at Leipzig where he met Franz Liszt and Richard Wagner. He was the creator of the Belgian section of the "Wagner-Verein".

Kufferath became director of the Théâtre de la Monnaie and on 6 March 1900 hired Sylvain Dupuis as first conductor. A perfectionist, Maurice Kufferath instilled a radiance into the musical and lyrical creation of the theatre and won recognition in the world of opera. He wrote the libretto in French and set the opera The Mikado or The Town of Titipu by Arthur Sullivan, at the Alhambra of Bruxelles on 23 December 1889.

An editor of "L'Indépendance Belge", he collaborated with the "Guide musical". His articles on Wagner are considered authoritative. From 1887 till 1891, Maurice Kufferath was editor of the Belgian and French classical music periodical "Le guide musical".

On 16 January 1886 he married Lucie Fouassier in Paris. Their son Camille Kufferath composed operas and ballets from the 1910s to the 1950s. Maurice Kufferath died in Uccle.

== Bibliography ==
- Henri Vieuxtemps: sa vie et son œuvre (Bruxelles: Rozez, 1882).
- L'Art de diriger l'orchestre: Richard Wagner & Hans Richter (Paris: Fischbacher, 1890).
- Le Théâtre de Richard Wagner: de Tannhäuser à Parsifal. Essais de critique littéraire, esthétique et musicale (Paris/Bruxelles/Leipzig: Fischbacher/Schott/Junne, several volumes, 1891–1899).
- Les Abus de la société des auteurs, compositeurs et éditeurs de musique (Bruxelles: Office Central, 1897).
- Musiciens et philosophes: Tolstoy, Schopenhauer, Nietzsche, Richard Wagner (Paris: Alcan, 1899).
- Salomé: play by Oscar Wilde, music by Richard Strauss (Bruxelles: Schott, 1907).
- Fidelio by Ludwig van Beethoven (Paris: Fischbacher, 1913).
- The Magic Flute by Mozart (Paris: Fischbacher, 1914-9).

| Preceded by Oscar Stoumon and Édouard-Fortuné Calabresi | Director of Théâtre royal de la Monnaie; 1900 – 1920 | Succeeded by Maurice Corneil de Thoran, Jean Van Glabbeke and Paul Spaak |
