= Campi Salentina =

Campi Salentina Griko:Campia
- Comune
- Comune di Campi Salentina
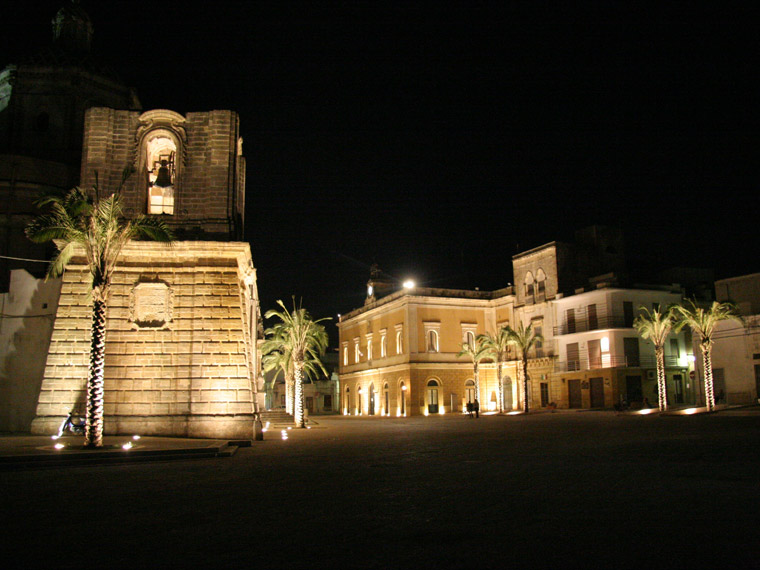

- Location within Italy Location within Apulia
- Coordinates: 40°24′N 18°1′E
- Country: Italy
- Region: Apulia
- Province: Lecce (LE)

Area
  - Total: 45.88 km^{2} (17.71 sq mi)
- Elevation: 33 m (108 ft)

Population (30 April 2017)
  - Total: 10,351
  - Density: 225.6/km^{2} (584.3/sq mi)
- Demonym: Campioti
- Time zone: UTC+1 (CET)
  - Summer (DST): UTC+2 (CEST)
- Postal code: 73012
- Dialing code: 0832
- ISTAT code: 075011
- Patron saint: St. Orontius
- Saint day: 1 September
- Website: Official website

Campi Salentina is a town and comune in the province of Lecce in the Apulia region of south-east Italy.

== People ==
- Carmelo Bene, an Italian author and actor
- Salvatore Calabrese, an Italian physician who founded a hospital in the town
- Alberto Rescio, professional football player
