= Alberto Rescio =

Italian footballer (born 1987)

Personal information
- Date of birth: 14 October 1987 (age 39)
- Place of birth: Campi Salentina, Italy
- Height: 1.83 m (6 ft 0 in)
- Position: Midfielder

Team information
- Current team: Barletta

Youth career
- Lecce
- Bari

Senior career*
Years	Team	Apps	(Gls)
2007–	Bari	0	(0)
2008–2009	→ Andria BAT (loan)	7	(0)
2009–	→ Barletta (loan)	26	(2)

International career^{‡}
2004	Italy U-17	2	(0)
- * Club domestic league appearances and goals as of 21:29, 7 May 2010 (UTC) ‡ National team caps and goals as of 23 March 2004

Alberto Rescio (born 14 October 1987 in Campi Salentina) is an Italian professional football player currently playing for Lega Pro Seconda Divisione team S.S. Barletta Calcio on loan from A.S. Bari.

== See also ==
- Football in Italy
- List of football clubs in Italy
