= Campocasso =

French impresario (1833-1908)

- Born: Auguste Deloche; 30 September 1833; Albert (Somme)
- Died: August 1908 (aged 74)
- Occupation: Theatre director

Campocasso, real name Auguste Deloche, (30 September 1833 – August 1908) was a 19th-century French theatre director.

After he had managed the Theatre of Lille, and then the one in Algiers in 1865, this deft impresario was appointed director of the Théâtre royal de la Monnaie in Brussels in 1873. After two seasons, he left the city to become director of the Théâtre Lyrique in Paris.

He was named director of the Grand Théâtre de Marseille in 1876, a position he kept until 1881, then was several times director of the Théâtre de Lyon.

== Career ==
- 1863-1865: Lille
- 1865-1867: Alger
- 1867-1868: Anvers
- 1869-1870: Toulouse
- 1870-1873: Paris
- 1873-1875: Brussels
- 1875-1876: Paris
- 1876-1881: Marseille
- 1881-1882: Lyon
- 1883-1884: Rouen
- 1885-1886: Marseille
- 1886-1887: Lyon
- 1888-1889: Lyon
- 1892-1893: Paris
- 1894-1895: Lyon

Preceded by François-Hippolyte Avrillon	director of the Théâtre de la Monnaie; 1873-1875	Succeeded by Stoumon and Calabresi
