= Frédégonde =

French opera (drame lyrique) in five acts

- Opera by Ernest Guiraud, Camille Saint-Saëns, and Paul Dukas
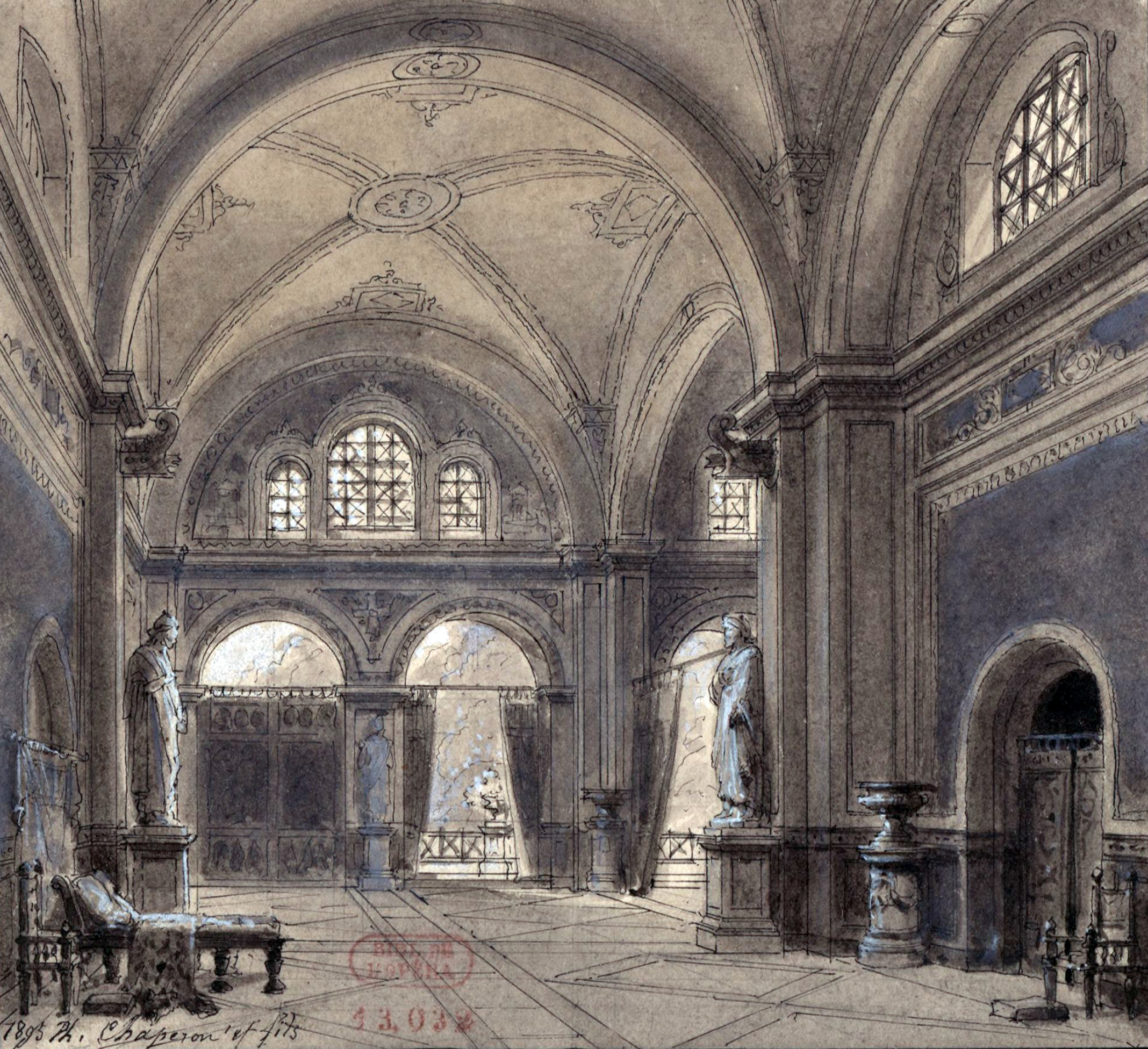
- Act 1 set design, a vast hall in a Gallo-Roman bath house, by Philippe Chaperon and his son Émile for the 1895 premiere
- Librettist: Louis Gallet
- Language: French
- Based on: Récits des temps mérovingiens by Augustin Thierry
- Premiere: 18 December 1895; Opéra Garnier

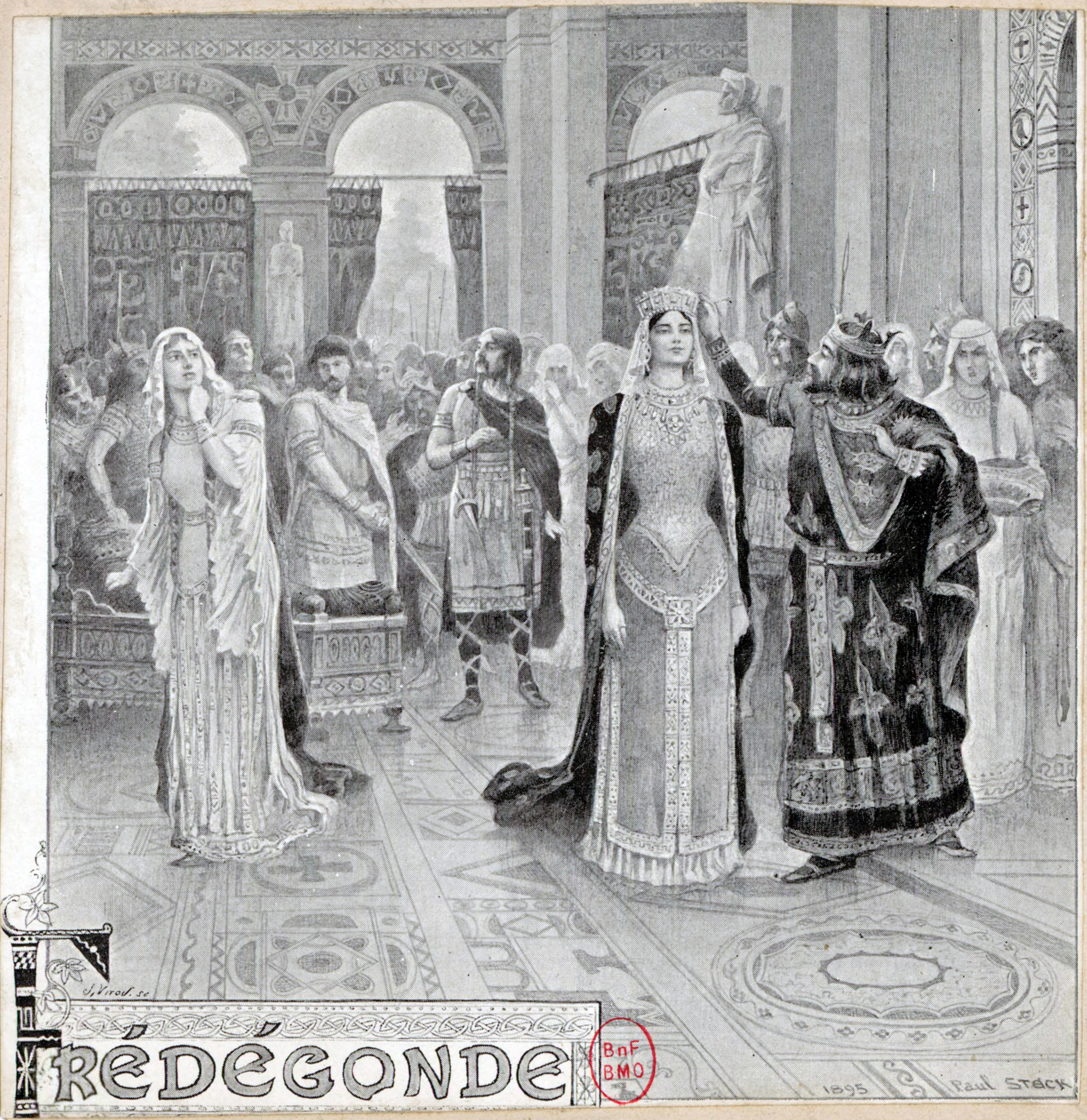
Frontispiece for the vocal score by Paul Steck, 1895

Frédégonde is an 1895 French opera (drame lyrique) in five acts with music by Ernest Guiraud, Camille Saint-Saëns, and Paul Dukas and a libretto by Louis Gallet based on Augustin Thierry's Récits des temps mérovingiens [Tales from the time of the Merovingians] (1840).

The opera was incomplete upon Guiraud's death in 1892. He had only composed the first three acts (in short score), and these were subsequently fully orchestrated by Paul Dukas. The music for the fourth and fifth acts and the ballet in the third act was composed by Saint-Saens.

== Performance history ==
Frédégonde was premiered by the Opéra at the Palais Garnier in Paris on 18 December 1895. The mise-en-scène was by Alexandre Lapissida, the costumes were designed by Charles Bianchini, and the choreography was by Joseph Hansen. The set designers for Act 1 were Philippe Chaperon and his son, Émile Chaperon; Act 2, Eugène Carpezat; Act 3, Marcel Jambon and Alexandre Bailly; and Acts 4 and 5, Amable.

The opera only received nine performances, with the last on 14 February 1896. Guiraud's music was considered foreign to his style, and, although the music by Saint-Saens was deemed better, the result was a work that was very uneven.

The first modern revival took place at the Saigon Opera House on 20 October 2017. The production was a collaboration with Grenoble's La Fabrique Opéra, whose founder, Patrick Suouillot, conducted the Ho Chi Minh City Orchestra. The six main roles were sung by French singers, including Valerie Altaver as Brunhilda, Matthieu Lécroart as Hilpérick and Richard Bousquet as Mérowig. The opera was revived in Saigon because that is where Saint-Saens completed the score, which he had brought with him when he was on a trip to Indochina.

The opera was also performed by Theater Dortmund in 2021 (a video was made) and a concert performance was given by Opéra de Tours in June 2022.

== Roles ==
| Role | Voice type | Premiere cast, 18 December 1895 Conductor: Paul Taffanel |
|---|---|---|
| Brunhilda, queen of Austrasia | soprano | Marie Lafargue |
| Frédégonde, queen of Neustria | mezzo-soprano | Meyrianne Héglon |
| Mérowig | tenor | Albert Alvarez |
| Hilpérik, king of Neustria, his father | baritone | Maurice Renaud |
| Prétextat, bishop | bass | René Fournets |
| Fortunatus | tenor | Albert Vaguet |
| Landéric | bass | Louis Ballard |
| Four Gothic seigneurs | basses | Euzet; Denoyé; Palianti; Chancelier |
| A servant | baritone | Lacome |

== Recordings ==
Frédégonde was scheduled for revival by Theater Dortmund in May 2021 in partnership with the Palazzetto Bru Zane but cancelled due to the COVID-19 pandemic. The opera was finally performed and live streamed on 20 November 2021 with further performances.
