= Philippe Chaperon =

French painter and scenographer

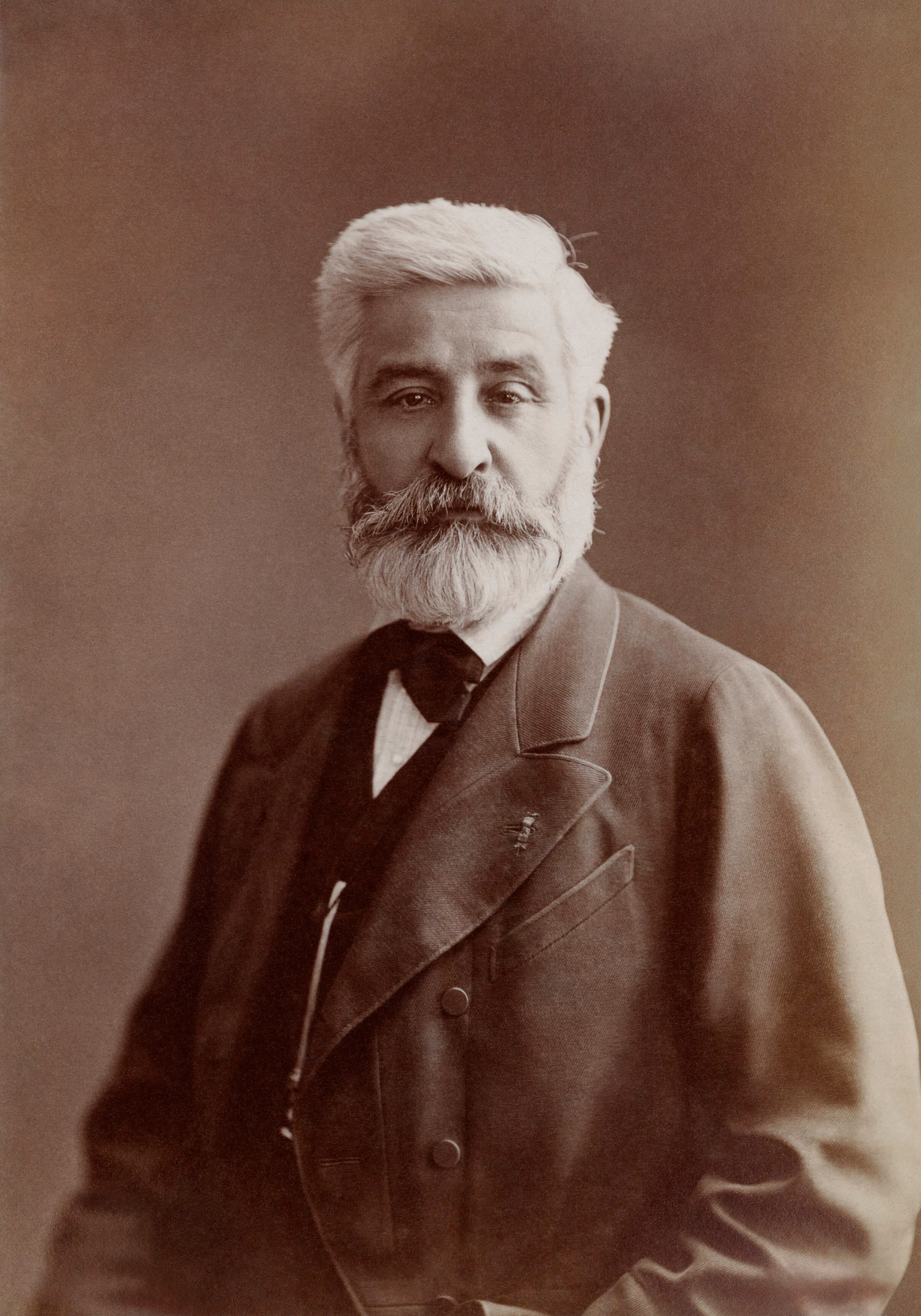
- c. 1900 photograph by the atelier of Nadar
- Born: Philippe-Marie Emile Chaperon; 2 February 1823; Paris, France
- Died: 21 December 1906 (aged 83); Lagny-sur-Marne, France
- Occupations: Painter; set designer

Philippe Chaperon (2 February 1823 – 21 December 1906) was a French painter and scenic designer, particularly known for his work at the Paris Opera. He produced stage designs for the premieres of numerous 19th-century operas, including Verdi's Don Carlos and Aida, Massenet's Le Cid, Saint-Saëns's Henri VIII, part two of Berlioz's Les Troyens and the first performances in France of Verdi's Otello and Rigoletto and Wagner's Tannhäuser.

== Life and career ==
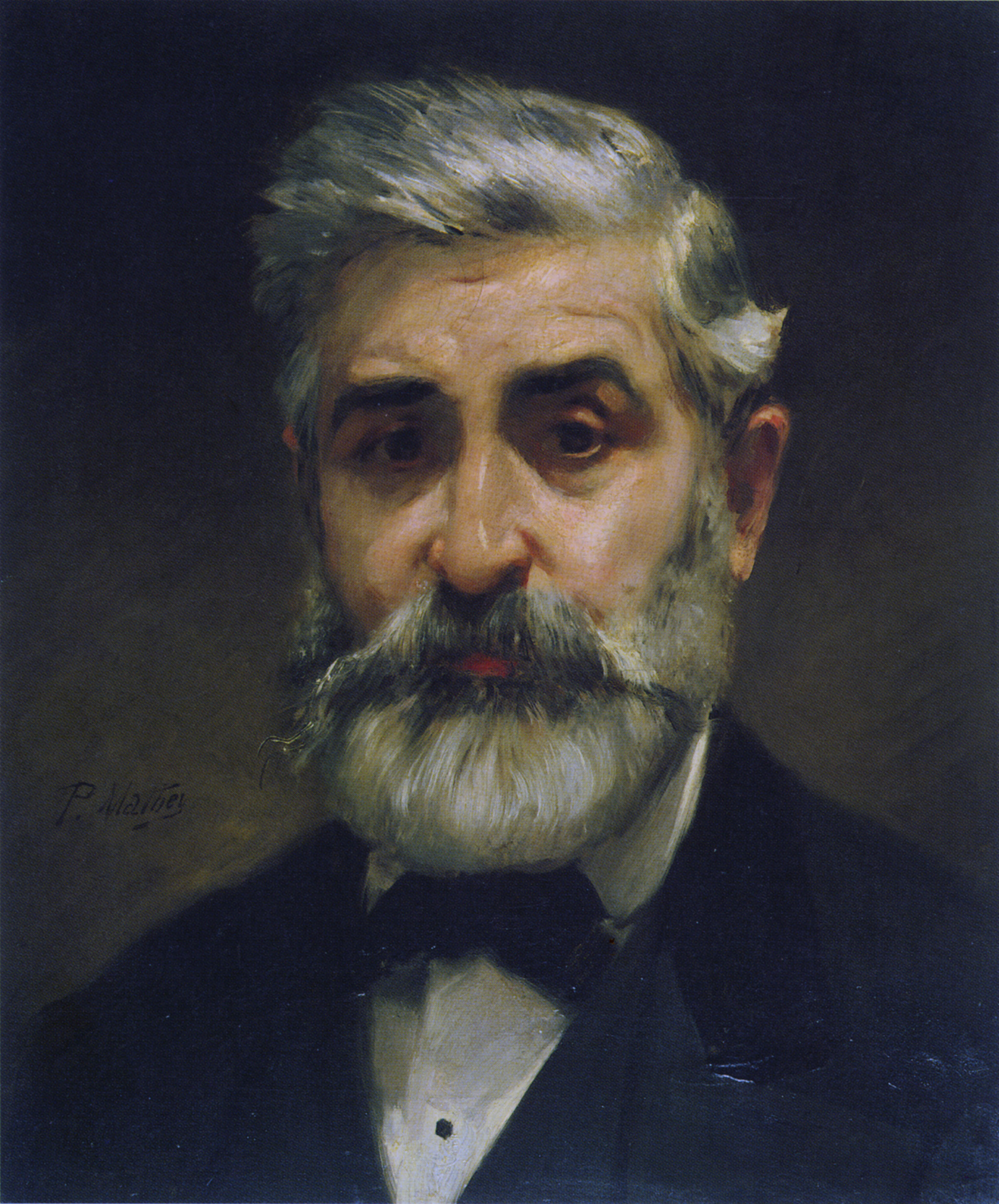
Portrait of Chaperon by Paul Mathey

Chaperon came from a modest background. He was born in Paris, where his father was an employee at the Caisse d'Épargne. He attended the Lycée impérial Bonaparte and then the École des Beaux-Arts where he studied painting and architecture. He won a Prix de Rome scholarship and spent three years at the Villa Medici. He also studied architecture in the atelier of Victor Baltard and painting in the atelier of Léon Riesener where he received guidance from Riesener's cousin Eugène Delacroix.

Many of his paintings were influenced by his architecture studies. He made his debut at the Paris Salon of 1844 with Ruines d'un Temple dans l'Inde (Ruins of a Temple in India). He later exhibited landscape paintings of cities and villages and the interiors of churches. However, it was as a scenic designer that he achieved his primary fame. He studied the craft from 1842 under Charles Cicéri and Domenico Ferri, both of whom designed for the main opera houses and theatres of Paris. He spent two years in Spain from 1847 to 1849. He had originally gone there to work on the decor for a theatre in Barcelona, but on Ciceri's suggestion he travelled around Spain painting and sketching scenes of villages and towns. Spanish subjects were coming into vogue in opera and his paintings would later serve as inspirations for Chaperon's stage sets.

In 1851 he joined Cicéri's old atelier which at that point was being run by Cicéri's son-in-law Auguste Alfred Rubé. Rubé and Chaperon formed their own atelier, "Rubé et Chaperon", in 1864 and over the next 30 years produced numerous set designs as well as interior decor for theatres throughout France and in Belgium. In 1875 they created the trompe-l'œil curtain for the newly built Palais Garnier as well as the painting on the dome over the main auditorium of La Monnaie. Chaperon also designed a trompe-l'œil curtain for the Éden-Théâtre which opened in 1883. In addition to his theatre work with Rubé, Chaperon produced decorative paintings and interior designs for churches, public buildings, and private mansions such as the Hôtel Goüin.

In 1895, Rubé left the atelier to form a new partnership with his grandson Marcel Moisson who had worked at Rubé et Chaperon. Chaperon carried on the atelier, joined by his son Émile, and together they produced designs for many opera and theatre productions in Paris that included La favorite, Les Huguenots, Frédégonde, Hamlet and Messidor. They also produced exhibits for the Exposition Universelle in 1900, and interior decor for numerous provincial theatres as well as the Municipal Casino in Biarritz which opened in 1901.

Chaperon retired to Lagny-sur-Marne in the suburbs of Paris 1905. He died there in 1906 at the age of 83. After his death, the painter and politician Étienne Dujardin-Beaumetz commissioned a bust of Chaperon by Charles-Henri Pourquet which was placed in the Palais Garnier. Émile spoke at its dedication on 5 December 1910:

This beautiful theater reminded him of some of his happiest and most admired inspirations – the temple of Aida, for example, or the unforgettable esplanade of Elsinore in Hamlet – he loved music passionately.

After his father died, Émile Chaperon continued working as a designer and later set up an art gallery on the Faubourg Saint-Honoré. He left Paris for Saint-Maur in 1932 and died in Confolens in 1946. Philippe Chaperon had two other sons: Eugène Chaperon (1857–1938), a painter and illustrator who specialised in military subjects, and the writer Philippe Auguste Théophile Chaperon (1853–c. 1938).

== Gallery ==
=== Set designs ===
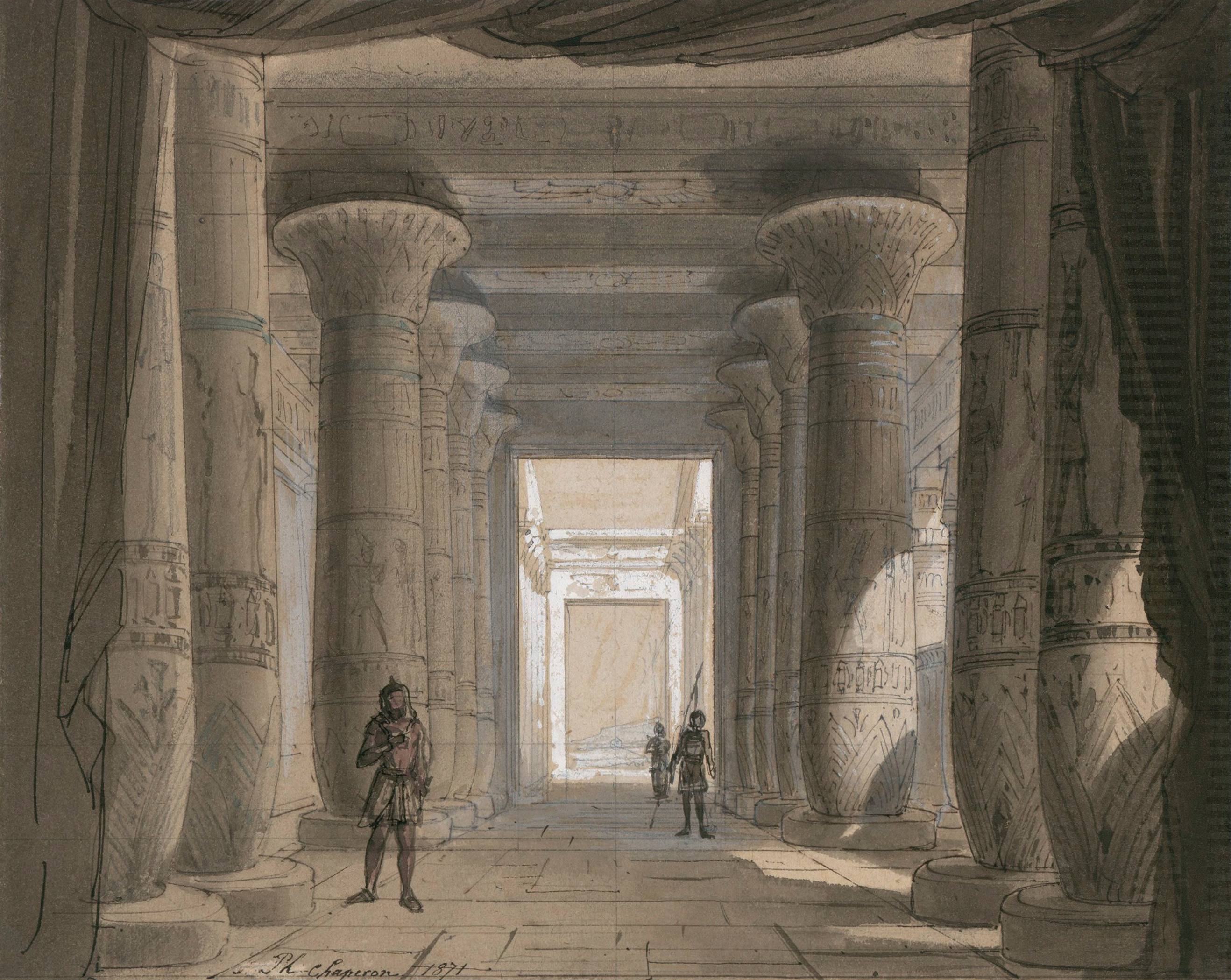
Aida (Act I, Scene 2)
1871 première Royal Opera House, Cairo

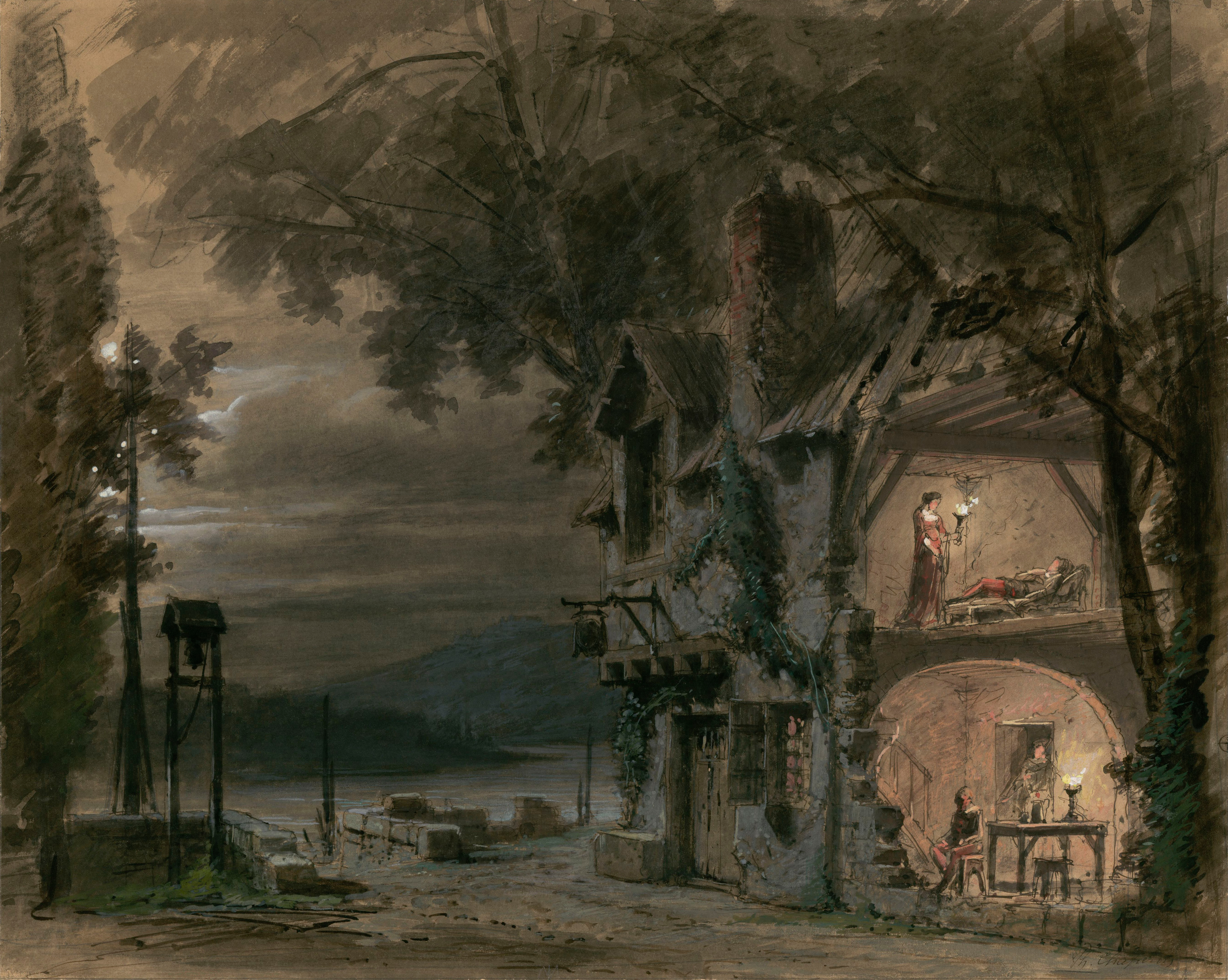
Rigoletto (Act III)
1885 revival Palais Garnier

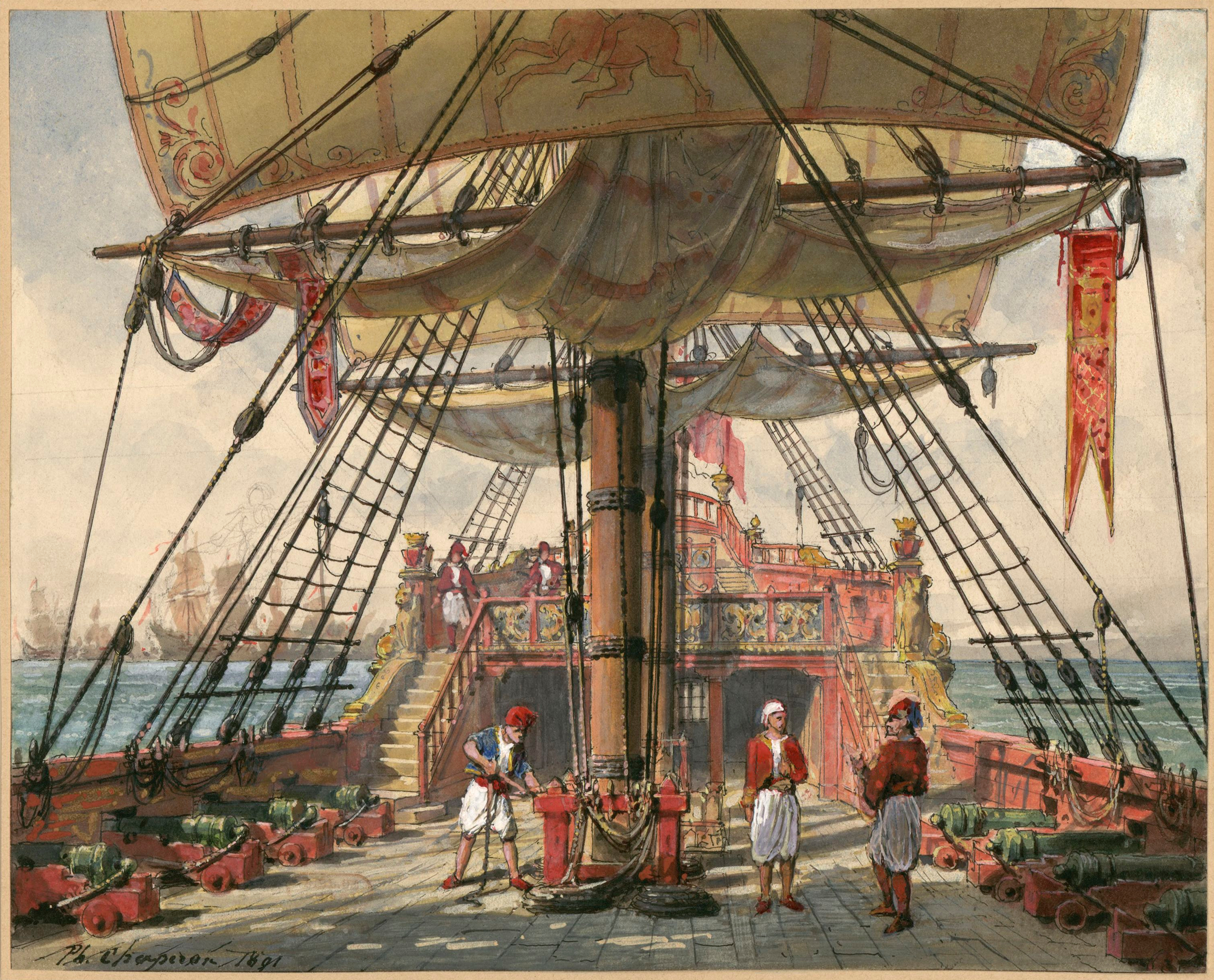
Haydée, ou Le secret (Act II)
1891 revival Théâtre de l'Opéra-Comique

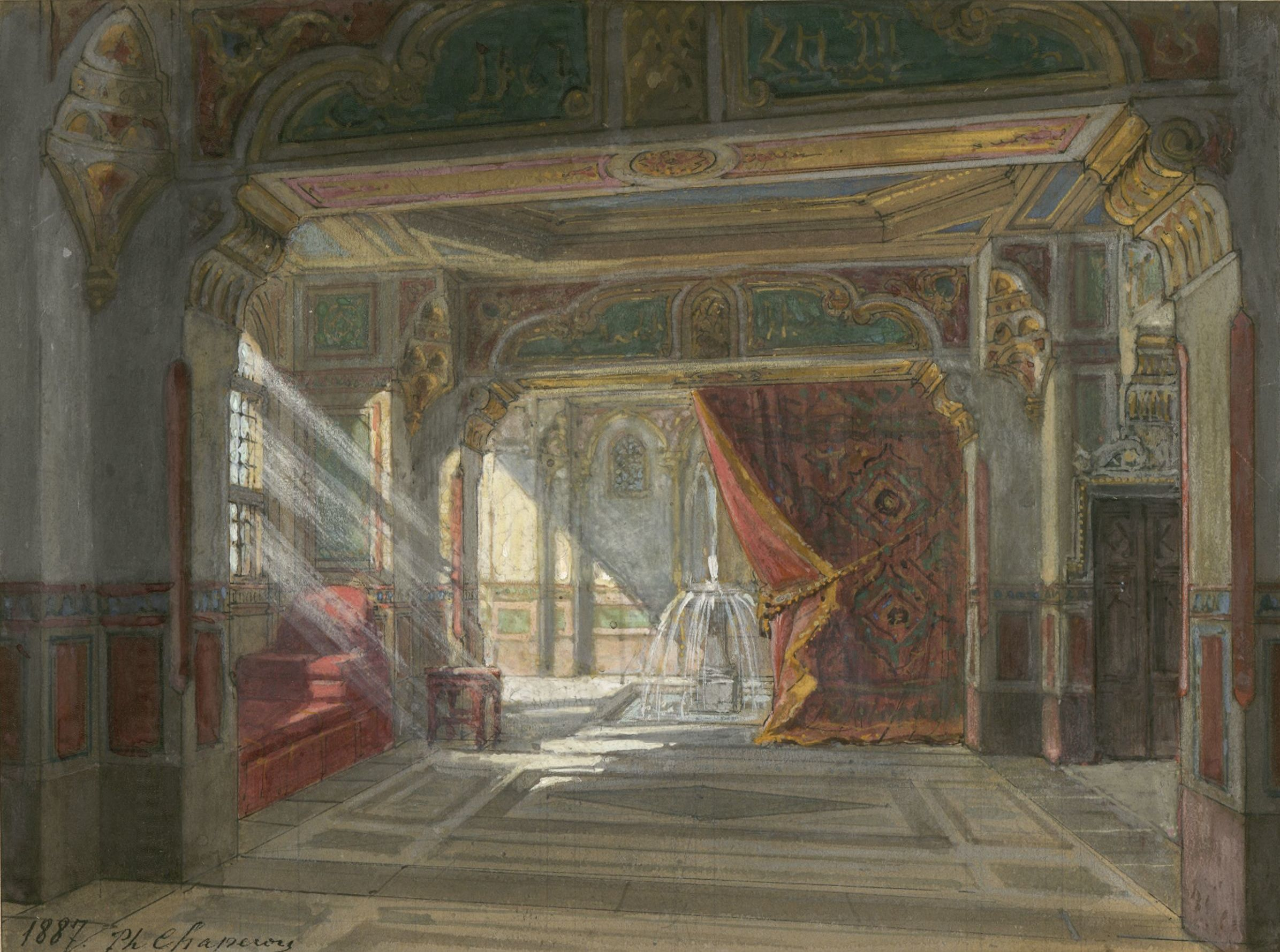
Oberon (Act II, Scene 1)
1887 revival Théâtre de l'Opéra-Comique (Note: The production was never realized as the theatre was destroyed by fire on 25 May 1887.)

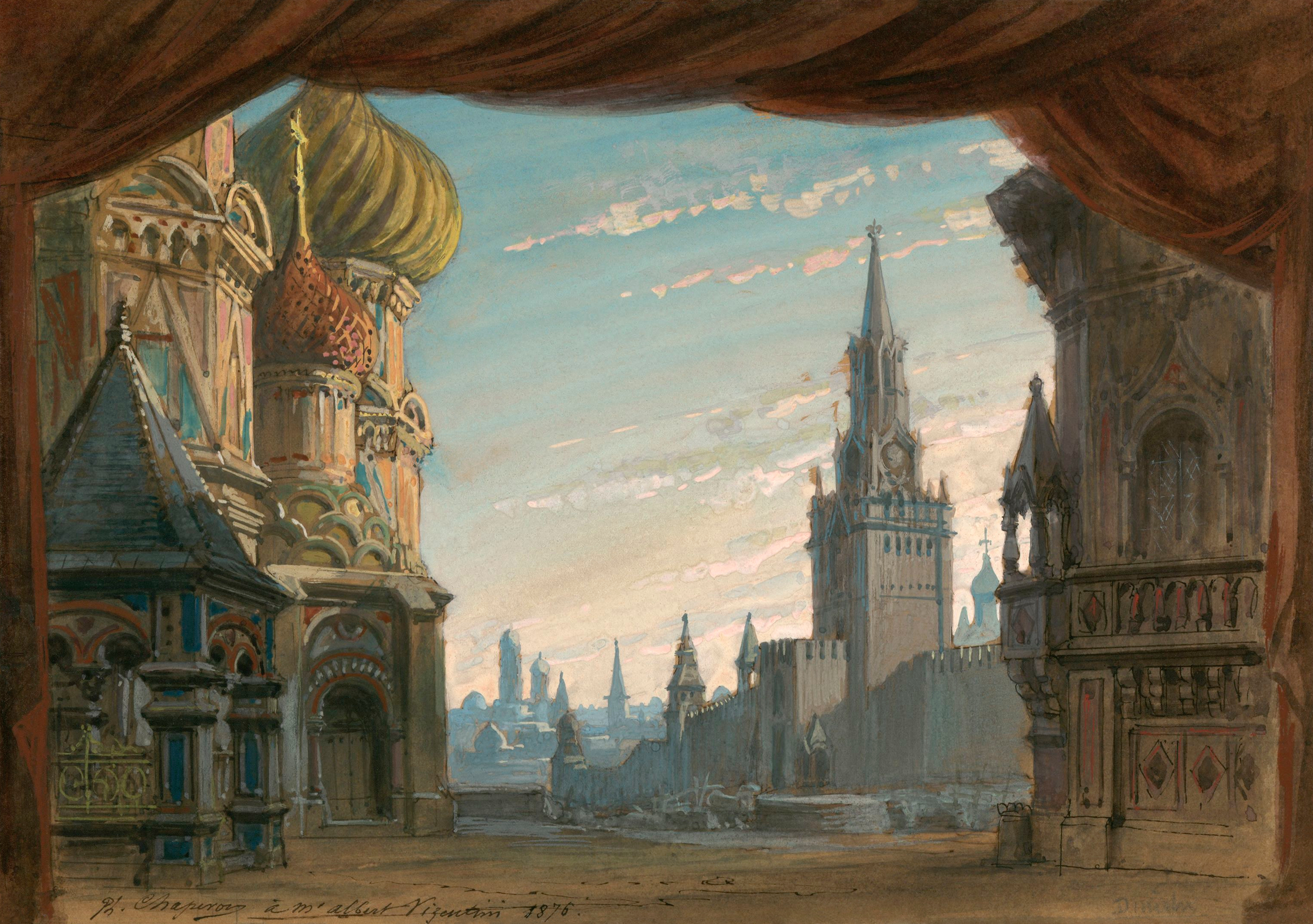
Dimitri (Act V)
1876 première Théâtre de la Gaîté

=== Paintings ===
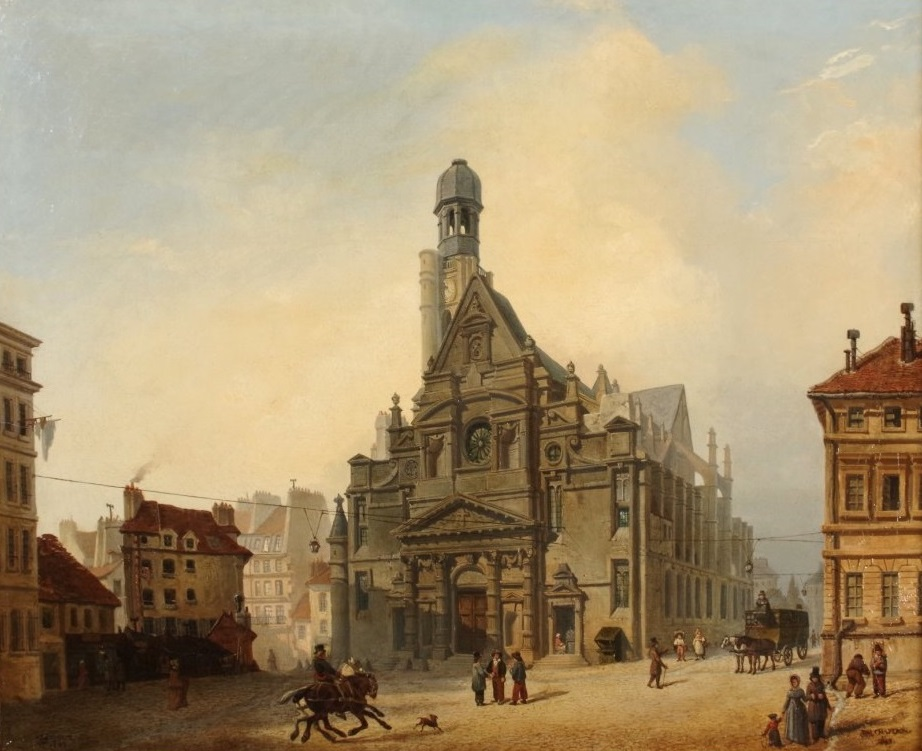
L'église Saint-Etienne-du-Mont (1842)

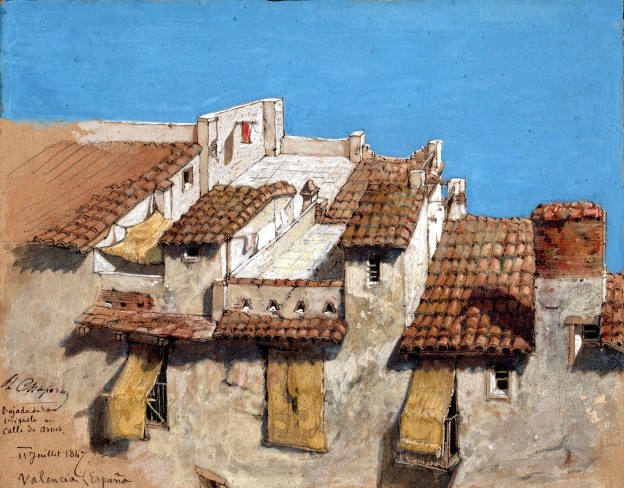
Bajada de San Miguel (1847)

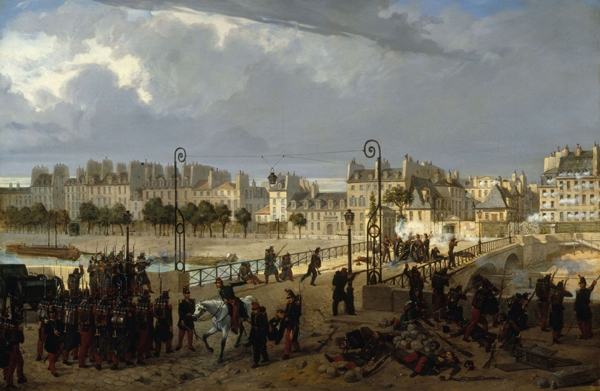
Scène d'émeute au pont de l'Archevêché (1849)

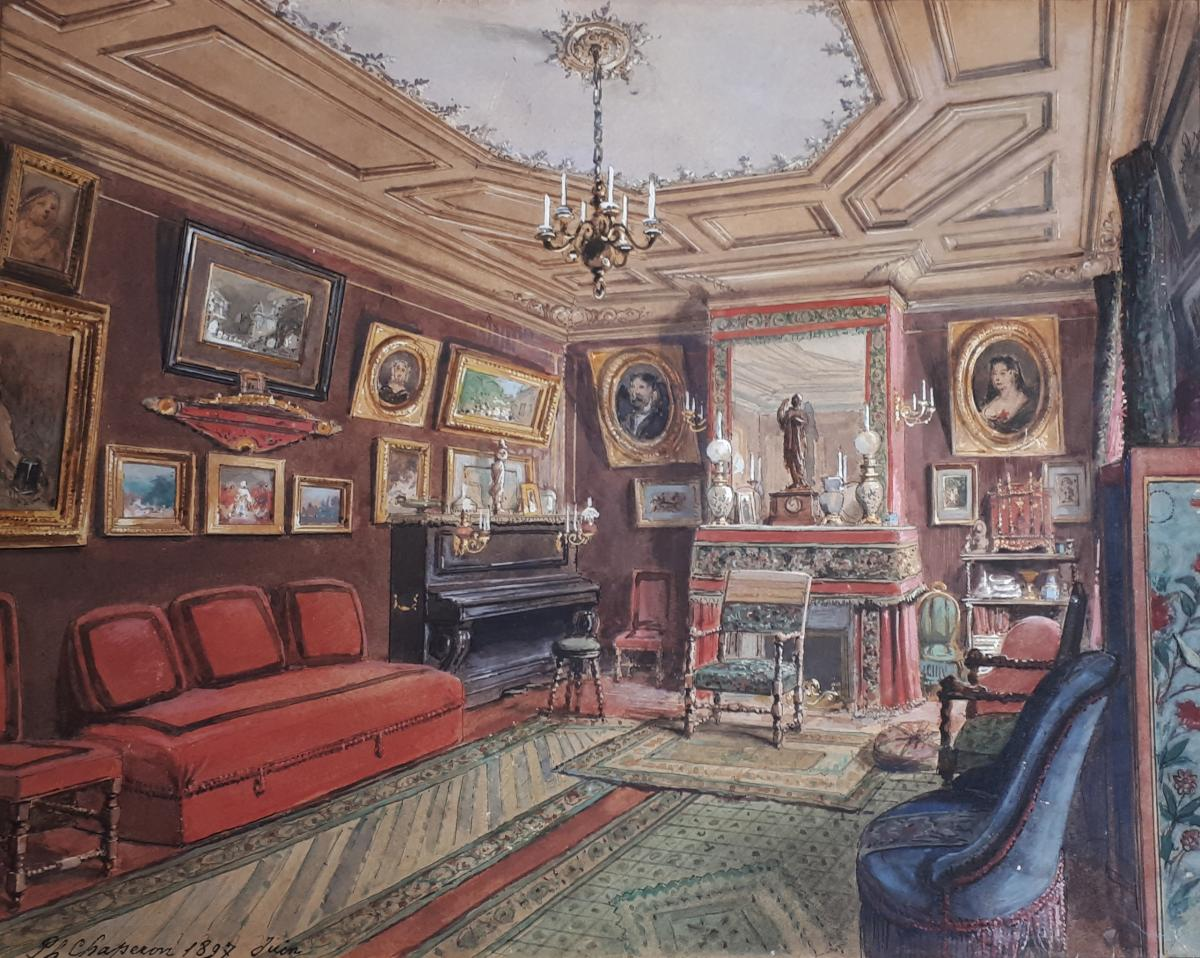
Intérieur d'un salon (1897),

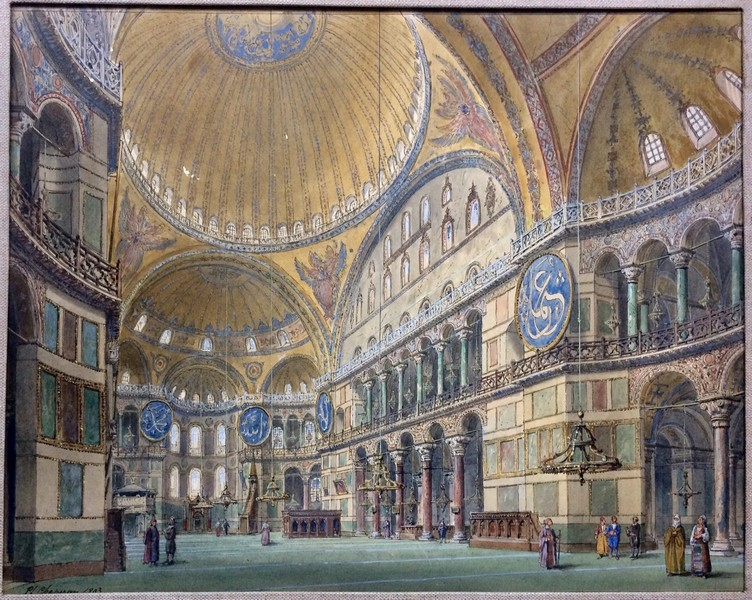
Basilique Sainte-Sophie (1893)
