= Salvatore Calabrese =

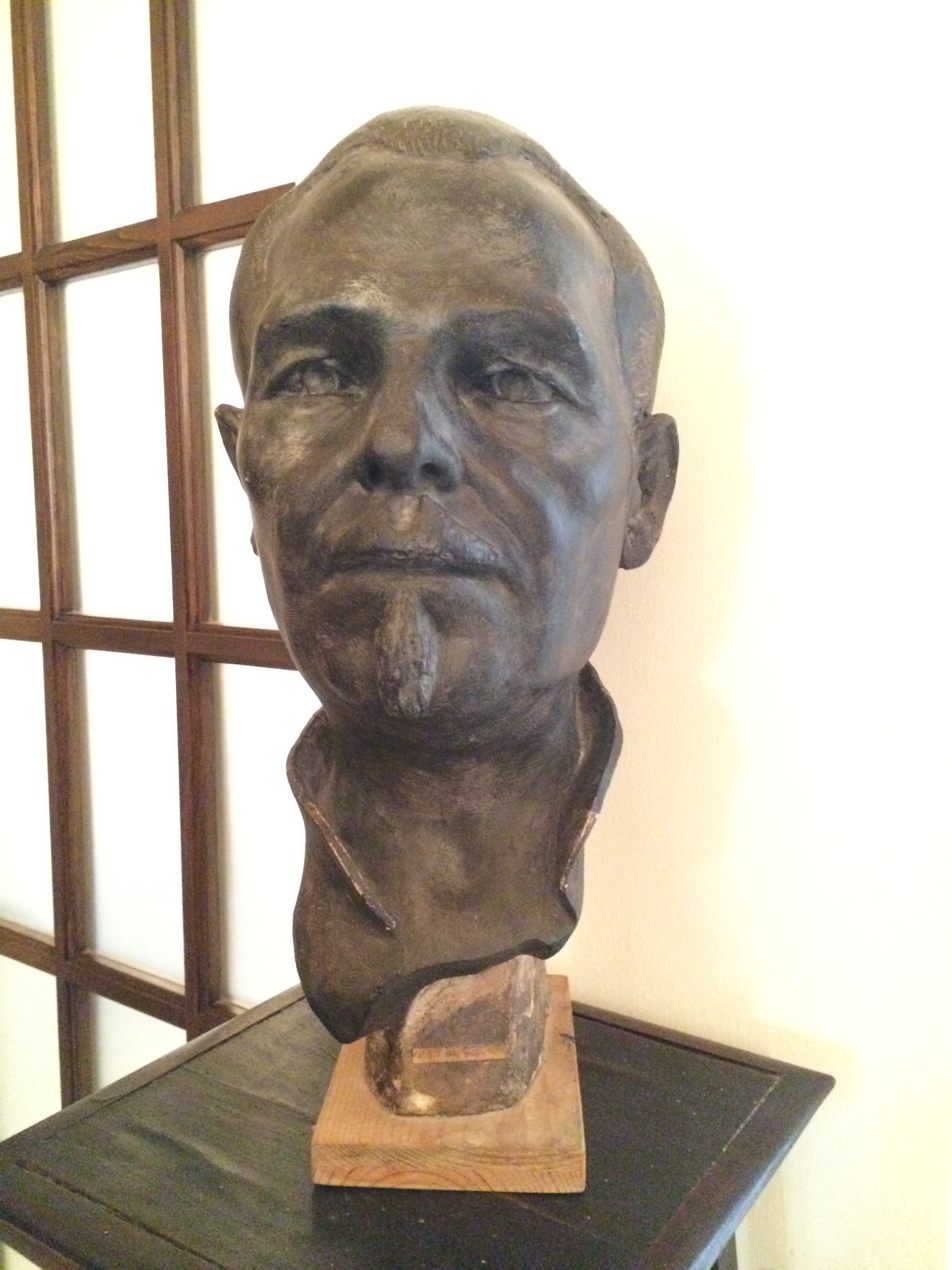
- Born: 6 January 1903; Campi Salentina, Italy
- Died: 30 November 1973 (aged 70); Bologna, Italy
- Scientific career
- Fields: Medicine

Salvatore Calabrese (Campi Salentina, 6 January 1903 – Bologna 30 November 1973) was an Italian physician, scholar of Anatomical pathology and specialised in Gastroenterology. He promoted the construction of the Hospital Padre Pio da Pietrelcina in Campi Salentina. He is also the founder of the orphanage and homeless shelter “Mamma Bella”.

== Biography ==
Salvatore Calabrese was born on 6 January 1903 in Campi Salentina (Lecce). In 1928, he graduated in Medicine and Surgery at the University of Naples Federico II. After that he moved to Genoa where he worked as volunteer assistant in the department of internal medicine at the Civil Hospital; then he became the medical director of the industrial company “Ansaldo”. During this period, he dedicated his studies to Anatomical pathology, and he also wrote various popular scientific publications. In 1939, he specialised in Gastroenterology at the University of Pavia. During the Second World War he took part in the Italian Resistance against the fascists and he also participated in military operations for the liberation of Genova. In 1945, Calabrese came back to Campi Salentina where he founded the orphanage and homeless shelter “Mamma Bella”, dedicated to three of his children who died prematurely. Five years later, he gave impetus to the foundation of the Hospital Padre Pio da Pietrelcina, where he became medical director in 1951. He died in Bologna on 30 November 1973 after a myocardial infarction.

== Sources ==
- Pellegrino, Bruno; Calabrese, Alfredo; Casella, Mario; Calabrese, Luca (2012). Salvatore Calabrese un personaggio del Novecento Salentino; scritti e testimonianze (in Italian). Lecce: Congedo Editore. p. 255.
