= Calabro (surname) =

Calabro is an Italian surname. Notable people with the surname include:

- Frank Calabro (1925–2011), politician
- Iliana Calabró (born 1966), Argentine actress
- Juan Carlos Calabró (1934–2013), Argentine actor and comedian
- Karen Calabro, American politician
- Kevin Calabro (born 1956), sports announcer
- Louis Calabro (1926–1991), composer
- Marian Calabro, author
- Richard Calabro (born 1979), actor
- Sandro Calabro (born 1983), footballer
- Thomas Calabro (born 1959), actor and director
- Joe Calabro (born 2003), tutor and teacher
