= Gary Lawson-Smith =

Australian rules footballer

Personal information
- Full name: Gary Lawson-Smith
- Born: 30 June 1947 (age 79)
- Original team: Central District

Playing career^{1}
Years	Club	Games (Goals)
1970–1971	Carlton	7 (0)
- ^{1} Playing statistics correct to the end of 1971.

Gary Lawson-Smith (né Gary Lawson Smith, born 30 June 1947) is a former Australian rules footballer who played with Carlton in the Victorian Football League (VFL).

He began his career as Gary Smith. Lawson was originally his middle name, before he changed his name from "Gary Lawson Smith" to "Gary Lawson-Smith" in 1970 to reduce confusion with a similarly named coworker.
