= Karyn Calabrese =

American raw foodist and restaurateur

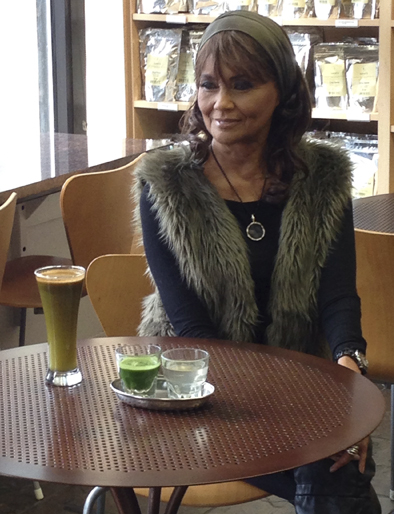
- Calabrese in February 2014
- Born: April 20, 1947 (age 79); Chicago, Illinois, US
- Occupations: Chef, businesswoman, author, holistic health expert
- Culinary career
- Cooking style: Plant-based, raw vegan
- Website: http://www.karynraw.com/

Karyn Calabrese (born April 20, 1947) is an American raw foodist and restaurateur. Her first restaurant, Karyn's Raw Bistro, is the longest-standing gourmet raw food restaurant in the United States.

== Early life ==
Calabrese grew up in Hyde Park, a South Side neighborhood of Chicago. Calabrese worked as a professional model in her teens and into her twenties, and was featured in national magazine and television commercials.

== Career ==
Calabrese became a raw foodist with the impression that eating uncooked foods improves health. In the early 1980s, she hosted a support group at her home. Calabrese decided to transition careers from modeling to cooking and consulting about the raw and vegan lifestyle.

Calabrese has opened three restaurants (Karyn's Raw Bistro, Karyn's Cooked, and Karyn's On Green), a market (Karyn's Fresh Corner), a meal program (Karyn's At Home), a holistic therapy center (Karyn's Inner Beauty Center and O2 Day Spa), a branded line of food, a cookbook, a cleanse guide, and a natural make-up and skin care line. Karyn also teaches workshops and promotes raw foodism, holistic therapies, and natural longevity.

Calabrese began having financial problems in 2012 after her restaurant in Lincoln Park burned down and business at her other locations stifled; in 2015 and 2016 she had been sued four times, for failing to meet accessibility standards for disabled persons at her restaurants, not paying rent for the spaces of her restaurants, and not paying condominium fees where she lived. She started a GoFundMe campaign to help keep her business afloat, but faced accusations of fraud and unsanitary practices.

In 2017, her flagship restaurant in Lincoln Park also closed down.

== Restaurants ==
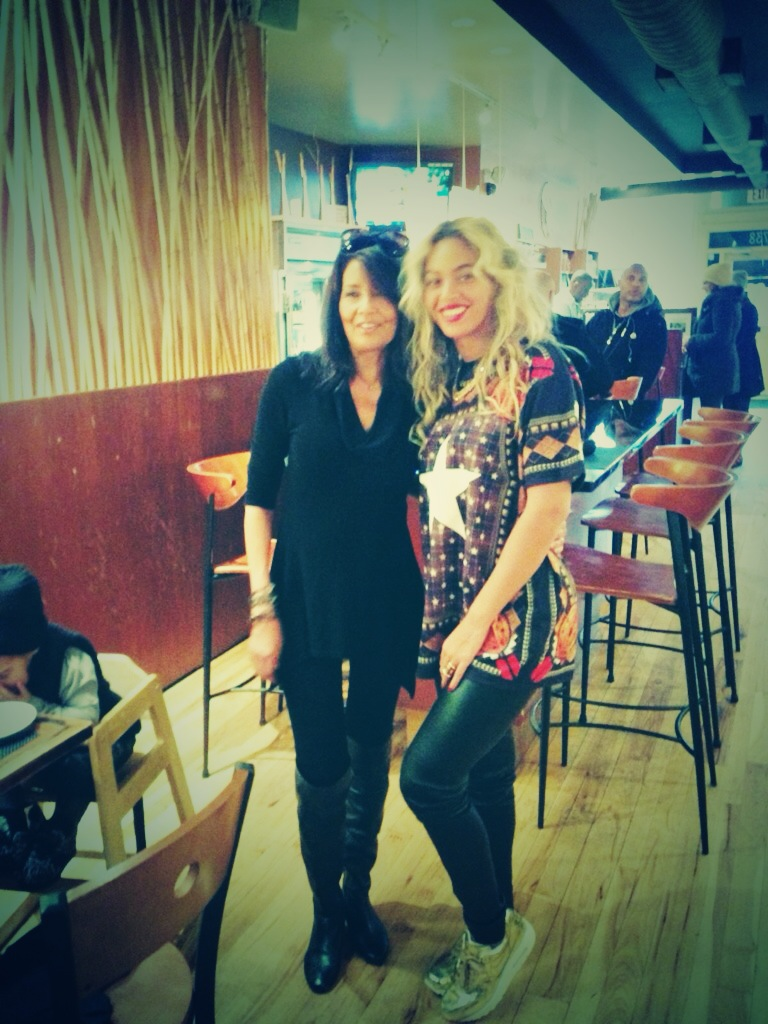
Karyn and Beyoncé at Karyn's Cooked in December 2013

Calabrese formerly owned and managed three restaurants in Chicago:

=== Karyn's On Green ===
According to the 2014 Zagat Survey, Karyn's On Green was the top-rated vegan restaurant in Chicago and the most formal of Karyn's restaurants. Karyn's On Green was located in Chicago's West Loop. The restaurant closed in 2015.

=== Karyn's Raw Bistro ===
Karyn's Raw Bistro was the longest-standing gourmet raw food restaurant in the United States. The restaurant closed in 2017.

Also connected to the restaurant is Karyn's Fresh Corner, a raw and organic market, and Karyn's Inner Beauty Center and O2 Day Spa, a holistic treatment center. Karyn's Raw Bistro was located in Chicago's Lincoln Park.

== Published works ==
- Cleansing With Karyn: Secrets for Inner Healing and Outer Beauty 2011 ISBN 978-1-57067-264-4
- Karyn's Conscious Comfort Foods: Recipes for Everyday Life 2013 ISBN 978-1-57067-275-0

== Awards and recognition ==
Calabrese was the 2013 winner of the Harper's Bazaar Fabulous at Every Age competition for the 60+ age category.
