= Calabrese horse =

Breed of horse

Calabrese
- Country of origin: Italy

The Calabrese is a breed of horse originating from Italy, generally used for riding. They were developed from horses bred in Italy before the founding of Rome, and the breed has continued to be developed to the present day through infusions of Arabian, Andalusian and Thoroughbred blood.

== Characteristics ==
The Calabrese generally stands 16 to 16.2 hands (163 - 168 cm) high, and can be bay, brown, black, gray or chestnut. They have a refined head with a straight or slightly convex profile, a well-shaped, muscular neck, prominent withers, long, sloping shoulders, and a broad, deep chest. The back is straight and the croup muscular and sloping. The legs are muscular with strong tendons and well-formed hooves.

The breed is used as a general purpose riding horse. They are generally active and energetic, while still manageable in temperament.

== Breed history ==
The Calabrese takes its name from the Calabria region of southern Italy, where it was developed. The breed has a long history, being a descendant of horses bred in Italy prior to the founding of Rome. However, the current characteristics started to evolve during the Bourbon period through the crossing of Arabian blood with Andalusian stock.

From the Middle Ages to the early 18th century, there was a decline in the breed as interest focused on the breeding of mules considered better able to cope with the terrain and workload. The mid-18th century to the mid-1880s saw a revival in the breed with the introductions of new Arabian and Andalusian blood. However, in 1874 the breed was again set back when many of the breeding studs were closed by a decree and much of the breeding stock split up.

In the 20th century, the breeding of the Calabrese began again and there was the introduction of Thoroughbred, Arabian, Andalusian and Hackney blood. The Thoroughbred blood was used to improve performance and increase the breed's stature, while Arabian blood is still continuing to be added to ensure the breed keeps its refinement and uniquely oriental characteristics.
