= Greg Calabrese =

American actor

- Occupations: Television actor, coach, teacher

Greg Calabrese is an American actor who played the recurring character of Trevor on the CBS soap opera The Young and the Restless. He is now a math teacher at Jenks Freshman Academy in Jenks, Oklahoma, as well as an assistant football coach for Jenks High School.
