= Peter Calabresi =

American neurologist

- Born: 1962 (age 63–64); New Haven, Connecticut
- Education: Yale College; Alpert Medical School
- Relatives: Steven G. Calabresi (brother); Guido Calabresi (uncle)

Peter Arthur Calabresi (born 1962) is an American neuroscientist and neurologist who studies multiple sclerosis. He is Professor of Neurology, Neuroscience, and Ophthalmology at the Johns Hopkins School of Medicine, where he directs the Division of Neuroimmunology and Johns Hopkins Multiple Sclerosis Center.

Calabresi was awarded a five-year MS center grant from the National MS Society for the study of mechanisms of neurodegeneration and strategies for neuroprotection in MS.

== Early life and education ==
Peter Arthur Calabresi was born in 1962 in New Haven, Connecticut. His father, Paul Calabresi, was a prominent oncologist who taught at Yale University and Brown University. Peter's brother is legal scholar Steven G. Calabresi.

Calabresi received a Bachelor of Science degree from Yale College in 1984 and an M.D. from Brown University's Alpert Medical School in 1988.

== Career ==
From 2000 to 2003, Calabresi taught neurology at the University of Maryland School of Medicine. He joined the Johns Hopkins School of Medicine in 2003.
