= Calabrian =

Calabrian may refer to:

- Calabrian, the people or culture of Calabria
- Calabrian Greek dialect, a dialect of Greek spoken in Calabria
- Calabrian languages, the languages and dialects spoken in Calabria
- Calabrian (stage), a stratigraphic stage or subdivision in the geologic time scale, part of the Pleistocene
- Calabrian wine

== See also ==
- Calabrese (disambiguation) (masculine singular and feminine plural)
- Calabresi (masculine plural)
