= Steven Calabresi =

American legal scholar (born 1958)

- Born: Steven Gow Calabresi; March 1, 1958 (age 68)
- Title: Clayton J. & Henry R. Barber Professor of Law
- Relatives: Guido Calabresi (uncle)

Academic background
- Education: Yale University (BA, JD)
- Influences: Ralph K. Winter Jr.; Robert Bork; Antonin Scalia

Academic work
- Discipline: Constitutional law; Comparative Constitutional law
- Institutions: Northwestern University; Yale University; Federalist Society

Steven Gow Calabresi (born March 1, 1958) is an American legal scholar who is the Clayton J. & Henry R. Barber Professor of Law at the Northwestern Pritzker School of Law. He is one of the three co-founders of the national Federalist Society and serves as Co-Chairman of its Board of Directors. Calabresi has written more than 110 law review articles and book chapters. He is also a columnist at SCOTUSblog and a contributor to The Volokh Conspiracy.

== Early life and education ==
Steven Gow Calabresi was born in Madison, Wisconsin, and grew up in Woodbridge, CT and in Barrington, RI. Professor Calabresi is the son of Paul Calabresi, an early adopter of chemotherapy in the treatment of cancer, and the brother of Peter Calabresi, a world-renowned figure in the treatment of Multiple Sclerosis.

Calabresi graduated from the Moses Brown School in Providence, Rhode Island, in 1976. He then attended Yale College, where he was elected President of the Yale Political Union. Calabresi graduated cum laude with his B.A. in History in 1979. Professors David Mayhew, Juan Linz, Donald Kagan, and Thomas Pangle were his most important teachers and mentors in college.

He received his J.D. degree from Yale Law School in 1983, where he was the Note & Topics Editor of the Yale Law Journal. His principal teachers and mentors at Yale Law School were Professors Joseph Goldstein, Ralph K. Winter, and Robert H. Bork.

In 1981, while a second-year law student, Calabresi and two Yale College friends, Lee Liberman Otis and David McIntosh, founded the national Federalist Society.

After law school, he served as law clerk for Judge Ralph K. Winter of the U.S. Court of Appeals for the Second Circuit, Judge Robert Bork of the U.S. Court of Appeals for the District of Columbia Circuit, and Justice Antonin Scalia of the United States Supreme Court.

== Teaching career ==
Calabresi joined the faculty of Northwestern University's Pritzker School of Law in 1990. He has been a visiting professor at Yale Law School (in the fall semesters of 2013, 2014, 2015, and 2016), and a visiting professor of political theory at Brown University, where he has taught since 2010.

== Political career ==
Calabresi served under presidents Ronald Reagan and George H. W. Bush from 1985 to 1990. During that time, he advised Attorney General Edwin Meese III, and Reagan Domestic Policy Chief T. Kenneth Cribb, and wrote campaign speeches for Vice President Dan Quayle. Calabresi supported legally recognizing same-sex marriages in 2014. In 2017, Calabresi endowed the Abraham Lincoln Lecture on Constitutional Law at Northwestern Pritzker School of Law in Chicago. The lecture's purpose is to show Lincoln's enormous talent as a constitutional lawyer and to ensure his lawyerly legacy is appreciated.

In July 2020, Calabresi wrote a New York Times editorial condemning a tweet by President Trump that floated postponing the 2020 election. Calabresi said the tweet "frankly appalled" him, called it "fascistic", and said it was "itself grounds for the president’s immediate impeachment again by the House of Representatives and his removal from office by the Senate."

On January 13, 2021, Calabresi and Democrat Norman Eisen co-wrote an op-ed in The New York Times saying that President Trump should be charged and impeached in a second trial before the end of his term in office or immediately after for what he said and did on January 6 and for his effort to subvert Georgia's election results by asking the secretary of state "to find" enough votes for him to win the state. The authors said that the Senate should disqualify Trump from ever holding any public office again after convicting him. They wrote that the recordings of Trump's phone call and his speech to supporters on January 6 were enough evidence to convict on those charges.

In 2024, Calabresi, Professor Gary Lawson, and former Attorneys General Edwin Meese III, Michael B. Mukasey, and William P. Barr filed an amicus brief before the U.S. Supreme Court in Trump v. Anderson, opposing efforts to remove Donald Trump from the ballot in the 2024 presidential election under Section 3 of the Fourteenth Amendment.

== Selected publications ==
Calabresi has published more than 110 law review articles or book chapters, including:

- Lawson, Gary; Calabresi, Steven (2019). "Why Robert Mueller's Appointment As Special Counsel Was Unlawful". Notre Dame Law Review. 95 (1): 87.
- Calabresi, Steven G. "" A Government of Limited and Enumerated Powers": In Defense of United States v. Lopez." Michigan Law Review 94.3 (1995): 752-831.
- Calabresi, Steven G., and Sarah E. Agudo. "Individuals Rights under State Constitutions When the Fourteenth Amendment Was Ratified in 1868: What Rights Are Deeply Rooted in American History and Tradition." Tex. L. Rev. 87 (2008): 7
- Calabresi, Steven G., and Gary Lawson. "The Unitary Executive, Jurisdiction Stripping, and the Hamdan Opinions: A Textualist Response to Justice Scalia." Colum. L. Rev. 107 (2007): 1002.
- Calabresi, Steven G., and Saikrishna B. Prakash. "The President's Power to Execute the Laws." Yale LJ 104 (1994): 541.
- Calabresi, Steven G., and Kevin H. Rhodes. "The Structural Constitution: Unitary Executive, Plural Judiciary" Harv. L. Rev. 105 (1991): 1153.

He has written or edited several books, including:

- Calabresi, S. G. (2007). Originalism: a Quarter Century of Debate. Regnery Press.
- Calabresi, Steven G., and Christopher S. Yoo. The Unitary Executive: Presidential Power from Washington to Bush. Yale University Press, 2008.
- Michael Stokes Paulsen, Steven G. Calabresi, Michael W. McConnell, Samuel Bray & William Baude, The Constitution of the United States. (Foundation Press 2010) [casebook] (2d ed. 2013) (3d ed. 2017).
- Calabresi, Steven Gow (2021). The History and Growth of Judicial Review, Volume 1: The G-20 Common Law Countries and Israel. Oxford and New York: Oxford University Press. doi:10.1093/oso/9780190075774.001.0001. ISBN 9780190075798.

== See also ==
- List of law clerks for the ninth seat of the Supreme Court of the United States
