= Ensival =

Coordinates: 50°35′N 5°51′E

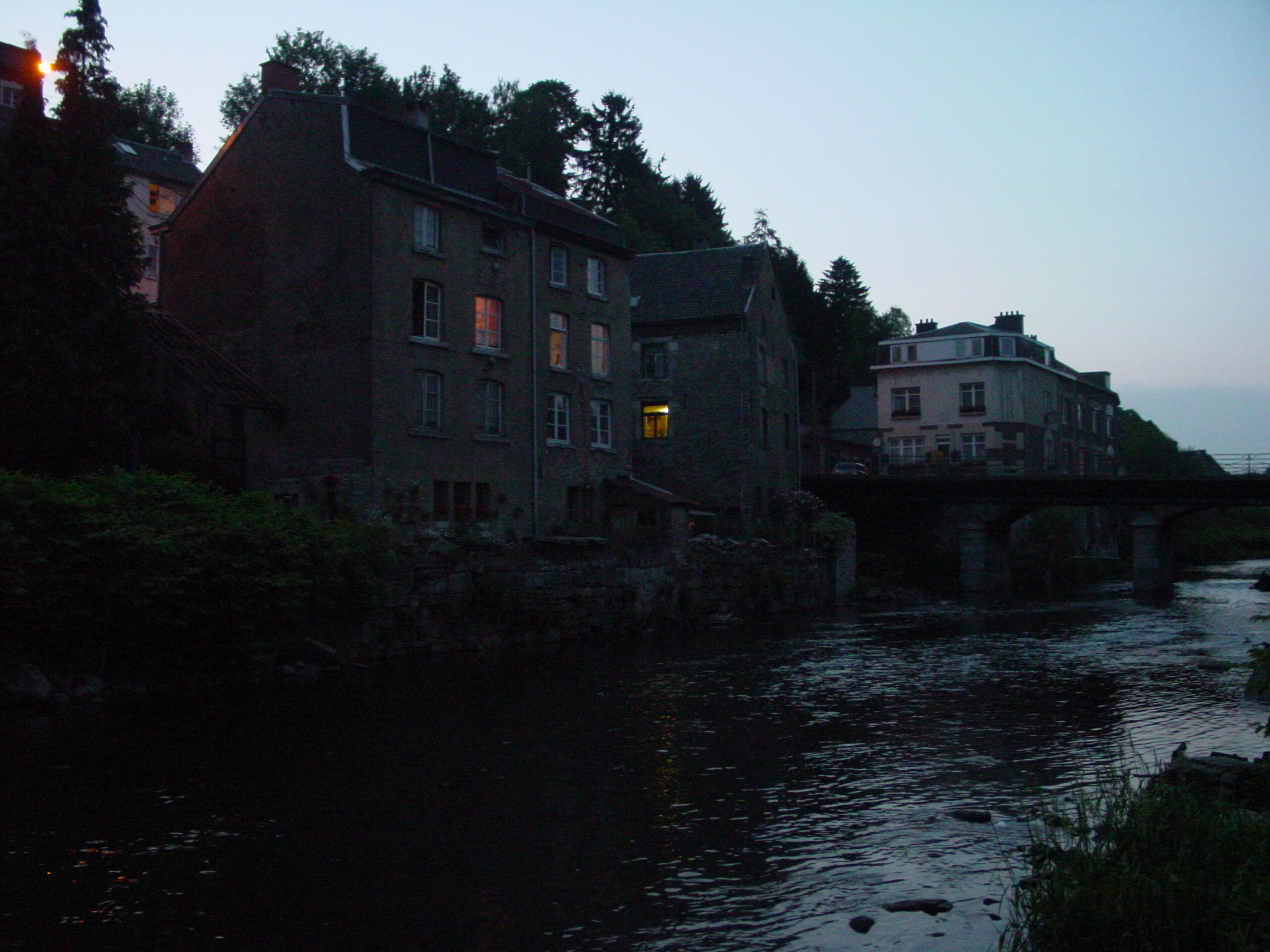
The Vesdre at Ensival bridge

Ensival (Walloon: Enzivå) is a town of Wallonia and a district of the municipality of Verviers, located in the province of Liège, Belgium.

Before the merging of the Belgian municipalities in 1977, it was a municipality of its own.
