= Henry Verdhurdt =

Belgian baritone, singing teacher and theatre director

Camille Henry Joseph Verdhurdt was a 19th-century Belgian baritone, singing teacher and theatre director.

== Life ==
Born in Namur, he married the granddaughter of François-Joseph Fétis, sang in several French productions and published several works on music, before becoming the director of the Théâtre de la Monnaie in Brussels in 1885–1886, following Oscar Stoumon and Édouard-Fortuné Calabresi. That season was financially disastrous, but Verdhurdt still managed to stage Gwendoline by Chabrier, which had been refused by the Opéra de Paris. The evening performance of 10 April 1886 was a triumph but Verdhurdt handed in his notice the following day. He was later director of the Théâtre de Rouen in 1889–1890.
