= Gary S. Lawson =

American lawyer

- Born: Gary Steven Lawson; October 14, 1958 (age 68)
- Education: Claremont McKenna College (BA); Yale University (JD)
- Occupation: Legal scholar
- Employer: University of Florida Levin College of Law

Gary S. Lawson (born October 14, 1958) is an American lawyer and scholar focusing on administrative law, constitutional law, legal history, and jurisprudence. He was a law clerk for then-Judge Antonin Scalia of the United States Court of Appeals for the District of Columbia Circuit from 1985–86 and again for Scalia during his 1986–87 term on the Supreme Court of the United States. Lawson is currently a professor at the University of Florida Levin College of Law. His immediately prior position was the Philip S. Beck Professor of Law at Boston University School of Law, and he previously taught at the Northwestern University Pritzker School of Law. He is the secretary of the board of directors of the Federalist Society. With Steven Calabresi, he has argued that the Mueller special counsel investigation was unlawful.

Lawson has been cited a number of times in majority opinions, concurrences, and dissents written by the Supreme Court.

== Contributions to legal theory ==
Lawson is a notable scholar and proponent of the constitutional doctrine of originalism. In 1997, he wrote a law journal article on originalism, "On Reading Recipes—And Constitutions", arguing that interpreting old text means trying to understand how its words would have been understood at the time they were written and illustrating his argument by imagining someone trying to cook fried chicken using a very old recipe, the instructions for which contain vagueness due to the dated nature of the recipe. He suggested that someone in that situation would do research to attempt to understand what the author of the recipe meant, and that this was the essence of originalism.

== Selected works ==
- Lawson, Gary (1997). "On Reading Recipes -- And Constitutions". Georgetown Law Journal. 1823 (1).
- Lawson, Gary; Calabresi, Steven (2019). "Why Robert Mueller's Appointment As Special Counsel Was Unlawful". Notre Dame Law Review. 95 (1): 87.

== Bibliography ==
- Lawson, Gary (2022). The Electoral Count Mess: The Electoral Count Act of 1887 Is Unconstitutional, and Other Fun Facts (Plus a Few Random Academic Speculations) about Counting Electoral Votes. Miami: FIU Law Review.
