= Salon music =

Genre of Western classical music

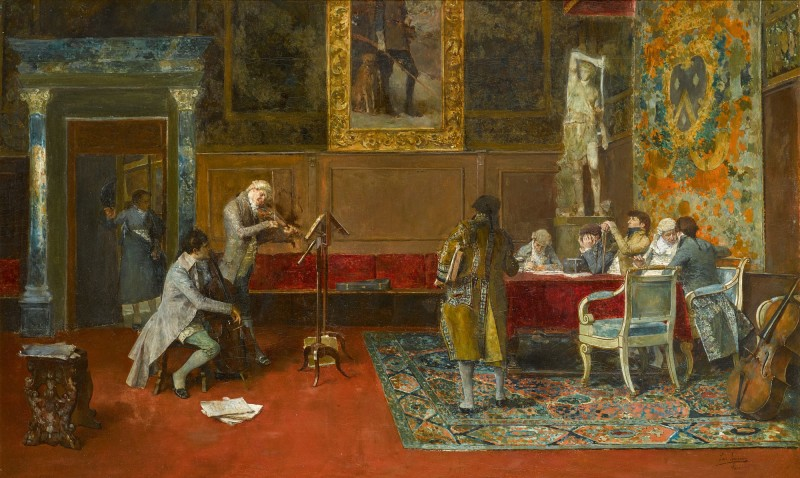
The Recital by the Spanish artist Luis Jiménez Aranda (1845–1928.) Depicts a social gathering for music, like that of a musical salon.

Salon music is a category of Western classical music cultivated in 19th-century Europe and intended primarily for performance in private domestic and social gatherings known as salons, rather than in public concert halls. Most often written for solo piano or for piano with one other instrument, the genre is broadly defined by short, self-contained pieces with lyrical melodies, clear tonal harmony, and immediately graspable forms. As a subcategory of Romantic music, it includes both lyrical character pieces such as nocturnes, romances and barcarolles and virtuosic showpieces such as operatic paraphrases, variations and fantasias.

== Definition and characteristics ==
The boundaries of the category of salon music have always been disputed, and there is no single agreed musical definition. As early as 1841, the German composer and critic Robert Schumann dismissed Salonmusik as superficial and sentimental, while in 1853 the theorist Johann Christian Lobe argued against generalisation, pointing to such works as Schumann's own Kinderszenen, Beethoven's Bagatelles, Weber's Aufforderung zum Tanze and Mendelssohn's Lieder ohne Worte as examples of music written for the salon that nonetheless possessed lasting artistic value.

In musical terms the genre tends to favour the character piece, a short composition built around a single idea, mood or scene and often given a programmatic title. Two broad currents are commonly identified: the lyrical character piece (nocturne, reverie, mazurka, waltz, polka), prized for cantabile melody, expressive rubato and tasteful ornamentation; and the virtuosic showpiece (operatic paraphrase, fantasia, étude and variation set), which reworked popular opera tunes and other familiar material with dazzling pianistic display.

== Origins and Parisian context ==
Musical salons existed throughout 19th-century Europe but are most thoroughly documented in Paris, where they took place in the homes of aristocratic families and members of the wealthy bourgeoisie. The events were typically hosted by women known as salonnières, were usually invitation-only, and often left only fragmentary documentation of their programmes, performers and attendees. Some functioned as informal sociable gatherings centred on music, such as the weekly salon hosted by Gioachino Rossini in Paris, which became a fashionable destination for music-lovers; others were more exclusive and virtuoso-focused, such as the soirées given by the pianist and pedagogue Pierre-Joseph-Guillaume Zimmerman. In a number of cases attendees paid a fee that helped cover the costs of professional performers, food and dancing.

As a semi-public, non-commercial space lying between strictly private music-making and the public concert, the 19th-century salon provided composers and performers a venue for trying out new works, building reputations and cultivating patronage, particularly in cities where opportunities for public concerts remained limited. Parallel salon cultures developed in Vienna, London, Saint Petersburg, Belgrade and elsewhere, often modelled on or in dialogue with the Parisian example.

== Notable salons and hosts ==
Among the best-documented Parisian salons of the 19th century was that of the mezzo-soprano Pauline Viardot (1821-1910), who from the late 1850s held Thursday-evening soirées and Sunday-afternoon matinées at 48 rue de Douai. Her salon is credited with launching or substantially advancing the careers of Camille Saint-Saëns, Jules Massenet, Gabriel Fauré and Charles Gounod, and counted among its visitors Hector Berlioz, Franz Liszt, Johannes Brahms and the writers George Sand and Ivan Turgenev. Other prominent Parisian hosts included Princess Mathilde Bonaparte, whose salon was a meeting point for the literary and musical elite of the Second Empire, and the American-born heiress Winnaretta Singer, Princesse de Polignac, whose salon in the late 19th and early 20th centuries commissioned works from Igor Stravinsky, Erik Satie, Manuel de Falla, Francis Poulenc and others.

The salon also provided a particularly important venue for women composers, who were largely excluded from public orchestral and operatic platforms. Cécile Chaminade (1857-1944), one of the most successful French composers of the late 19th century, completed roughly 400 works, mostly for piano and voice, and toured widely in Britain and the United States; in 1913 she became the first woman composer to be made a member of the Légion d'honneur.

== Composers ==
Many leading 19th-century composers wrote at least some pieces that fall within the salon-music category, and a number of pianist-composers worked predominantly or exclusively in the genre. Frédéric Chopin, although his mature reputation rests on works of much wider scope, made the Parisian salon his principal venue and is credited by the scholar Jim Samson with transmuting the conventions of salon art into a more deeply poetic style. The following is a list of 19th- and early-20th-century composers in whose output salon music was predominant or substantial.

- Franz Behr
- Carl Bohm
- Mélanie Bonis
- Georges Boulanger (violinist)
- Teresa Carreño
- Ignacio Cervantes
- Emmanuel Chabrier
- Cécile Chaminade
- Frédéric Chopin
- Charles Delioux
- Benjamin Godard
- Louis Moreau Gottschalk
- Alphonse Hasselmans
- Fanny Hensel
- Henri Herz
- Jean-Chrisostome Hess
- Rudolph G. Kopp
- Théodore Lack
- Georges Lamothe
- Gustav Lange
- Désiré Magnus
- Jules Massenet
- Ignaz Moscheles
- Moritz Moszkowski
- Charles Oberthür
- Joseph O'Kelly
- Georges Pfeiffer
- Auguste Pilati
- Juventino Rosas
- Julius Schulhoff
- Martinus Sieveking
- Sydney Smith
- Maria Szymanowska
- Sigismond Thalberg
- Francis Thomé
- Francesco Paolo Tosti
- Paul Wachs
- Ethelbert Nevin
- Francisco Tárrega
- Fritz Kreisler

== Well known performers ==
- Adolf Busch
- Fritz Busch
- Pablo Casals
- Emanuel Feuermann
- Jascha Heifetz
- Paul Hindemith
- Fritz Kreisler
- Pablo Sarasate
- Rudolf Serkin
- Jacques Thibaud

== Critical reception ==
Throughout much of the 20th century, salon music was widely treated as a marginal or aesthetically suspect category. Nicolas Slonimsky's entry for "pseudo-music" in the fourth edition of Music Since 1900 (1971) used the salon as a shorthand for trivial composition, and the 1980 first edition of The New Grove Dictionary of Music and Musicians reprinted Gustave Ferrari's 1911 Grove's Dictionary assessment that Chaminade's music was intended for the drawing room. Scholars such as Marcia Citron have argued that this dismissal disproportionately affected women composers, whose association with the salon was used to discount their wider compositional output. More recent musicological work has reframed salon music as a serious object of study, examining its social functions, its commercial and pedagogical dimensions, and the considerable artistic ambitions of individual composers and works within the category.

== Modern revival ==
From the late 20th century onward there has been a sustained recording revival of 19th-century salon repertoire, driven in part by specialist labels such as Hyperion Records, whose The Romantic Piano Concerto series and other releases have restored to the catalogue dozens of pianist-composers active primarily in salon contexts. The Canadian pianist Marc-André Hamelin, an exclusive Hyperion recording artist, has made many of these neglected works central to his concert and recording programmes, alongside the more familiar repertoire of Charles-Valentin Alkan, Nikolai Medtner and others. The genre's social and commercial counterpart, the parlour music tradition of Britain and North America, has likewise received renewed scholarly and performance attention.

== See also ==
- Character piece
- Parlour music
- Romantic music
- Salon (gathering)
- Salonnière
