= List of compositions by Clémence de Grandval =

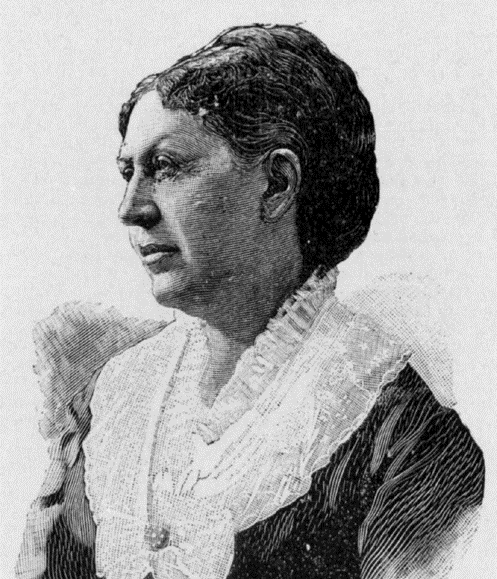
Clémence de Grandval

This is a list of compositions by Clémence de Grandval (1828–1907), also known as Marie Grandval and Marie Félicie Clémence de Reiset, Vicomtesse de Grandval.

== Opera ==
- Le sou de Lise (1859)
- Les fiancés de Rosa (1863), libretto by Adolphe Choler
- La comtesse Eva (1864), libretto by Michel Carré
- Donna Maria Infanta di Spagna (1865), libretto by Leiser
- La pénitente (1868), libretto by Henri Meilhac and William Bertrand Busnach
- Piccolino (1869), libretto by Achille de Lauzières. f.p. Paris, Théâtre Italien, 5 January 1869, with Gabrielle Krauss (title role)
- La forêt: poème lyrique (1875), libretto by Clémence de Grandval.
- Atala: poème lyrique (c. 1888), libretto by Louis Gallet
- Mazeppa (1892), libretto by Charles Grandmougin and Georges Hartmann. f.p. Bordeaux, Grand Théâtre Municipal, April 1892, Ch. Haring, cond. with Maurice Devriès (title role), and Bréjean Bravière.
- Le bouclier de diamant

== Liturgical choral ==
- Mass (1867)
- Stabat mater (1870), cantata
- Agnus dei
- Gratias
- Kyrie
- Pater noster
- O salutaris

== Other choral ==
- Jeanne d'Arc: scène (1862), libretto by Casimir Delavigne
- Regrets: scène-mélodie (1866)
- Sainte-Agnès (1876), oratorio, libretto by Louis Gallet
- Villanelle (1877), duet with flute
- La ronde des songes: scène fantastique (1880), libretto by Paul Collin
- La fille de Jaïre (1881), oratorio, libretto by Paul Collin
- Heures, for 4 voices

== Symphonies ==
One symphony, tried at the Société des Concerts du Conservatoire and performed in 1851 by Berlioz's Société Philharmonique, is lost.

== Concertante ==
- Gavotte for piano and orchestra (1885)
- Concertino for violin and orchestra
- Oboe concerto in D minor, Op. 7

== Other orchestral ==
- Esquisses symphoniques (1874)
- Ronde de nuit (1879)
- Divertissement hongrois (c. 1890)

== Chamber ==
- Suite de morceaux for flute and piano (1877)
- Chanson suisse for cello and piano (1882)
- 3 pieces for cello and piano (1882):
  - Andante con moto
  - Sérénade
  - Chant serbe
- 2 pieces for violin and piano (1882)
- Prelude and variations for violin and piano (1882)
- Ronde de nuit (1883), arrangement for 2 pianos
- 2 pieces for oboe, cello and piano (1884):
  - Romance
  - Gavotte
- Gavotte for cello, double bass and piano (1885)
- 2 pieces for clarinet and piano (1885):
  - Invocation
  - Air slave
- Morceaux for cor anglais and clarinet (c. 1900)
- 2 piano nocturnes, Opp. 5 and 6
- Sonata for violin and piano, Op. 8
- Mazurka du ballet for 2 pianos
- Musette for violin
- Offertoire for violin, cello, harp and piano
- 4 pieces for cor anglais and piano
- Romance for cello, double bass and piano
- Septet
- Trio for oboe, bassoon and piano
- Trio for oboe, cello and piano
- 2 trios for piano, violin and cello
- Valse mélancolique for flute and harp

== Songs ==
- Collection of c. 50 songs (c. 1860):
  - "Trilby", text by P. S. Nibelle
- "Le bohémien" (1864), text by Michel Carré
- "La délaissée" (1867), text by J. du Boys
- "Avril" (1869), text by Rémy Belleau
- "Eternité" (1883), text by Paul Collin
- Six poésies de Sully Prudhomme (1884)
- "Noël!" (1901), text by Sully Prudhomme
- "Menuet" (1902), text by Fernand Gregh
- "Fleur de matin", duet
- "Les lucioles"
- "Rose et Violette", duet
