= Marmontel =

Marmontel is a surname. Notable people with the surname include:

- Jean-François Marmontel (1723–1799), French literary figure
- Antoine François Marmontel (1816–1898), French pianist and musicographer
