= Paul Bernard =

Paul Bernard may refer to:

- Paul Bernard (composer) (1827–1879), French composer
- Paul Bernard (actor) (1898–1958), French actor
- Paul Bernard (director) (1929–1997), English TV director
- Paul Bernard (archaeologist) (1929–2015), French archaeologist
- Paul Bernard (footballer) (born 1972), Scottish footballer
- Paul Bernard, Psychiatrist, a 1971–72 Canadian television series
