= Auguste O'Kelly =

French music publisher (1829–1900)

Auguste O'Kelly (13 July 1829 – 16 February 1900) was a Franco-Irish music publisher in Paris between 1872 and 1888.

== Life ==
Auguste O'Kelly was born as Louis Auguste Kelly in Boulogne-sur-Mer as the second son of the Dublin-born piano teacher Joseph Kelly (1804–1856). His brothers included the composers Joseph O'Kelly (1828–1885) and George O'Kelly (1831–1914). Around 1835 the family moved to Paris, where they lived in the Faubourg Poissonnière area of the 9th arrondissement. Nothing is known of his early education, but it may be presumed that he received piano lessons by his father. His name appears in the membership lists of the Association des artistes musiciens for four years from 1850 and again from 1862 to 1864. Like his brothers, he went to Boulogne-sur-Mer in 1859 to have his name officially changed from Kelly to O'Kelly. The manufacturing register of the Paris piano maker Pleyel suggests that he sold pianos for them (or at least acted as an intermediary between the manufacturer and dealers) mainly between 1867 and 1871.

In May 1872 O'Kelly took over the music publishing business Magasin de Musique du Conservatoire on 11 rue du Faubourg Poissonnière in the 9th arrondissement of Paris. This was active until late 1888 (see below). From 1872 until 1881 he also ran a piano shop at the same premises, where he sold pianos that were branded with the name of his publishing business. Most likely, however, he was not a piano maker but a dealer only.

In October 1872 his son Gustave O'Kelly (1872–1937) was born, the (unmarried) mother being Juliette Patinier, at 25 years of age 18 years younger than Auguste. She died less than two years later (in May 1874). Auguste then married Fanny Vincent (1827–1901) on 3 December 1874.

After O'Kelly closed down his publishing business he was active in various functions at the Conservatoire in Paris, including as Bibliothéquaire-adjoint and as secretary of the committee for admissions et propaganda. He retired from these positions in 1892 and appeared forthwith as secretary of the Association des artistes musiciens. He died in Paris, aged 70, on 16 February 1900 in the home of his son in Avenue Trudaine, 9th arrondissement. His funeral service was held in Notre-Dame-de-Lorette, and he was buried on the Père Lachaise cemetery, where the grave is still extant (in Division 74).

== Magasin de Musique du Conservatoire ==
Auguste O'Kelly's company was initially founded in 1794 as Magasin de musique à l'usage des fêtes nationales, to which was added ou Imprimerie du Conservatoire in August 1797. Originally it was the publishing arm of the Conservatory of Music in Paris, publishing works and teaching material by the Conservatory's professors. It was taken over in 1826 by Janet et Cotelle and again in April 1831 by Eugène Troupenas (1798–1850), after whose death it went to Brandus et Cie. Brandus was interested in the published repertory only, not in the premises and the brand name. These were taken up by a new publisher, Madame Célèste Cendrier, who had been publishing music since 1841. The Magasin again changed hands after Cendrier's death in 1859, now to Edme Saint-Hilaire, further on to Émile Cellerin in late 1868, who had to close down as a consequence of the Franco-Prussian War in 1871. O'Kelly came into business on 1 May 1872. Within the next 16 and a half years he published about 1,500 pieces of music. His catalogue consisted mainly of piano music and songs, for which there was a great demand both for professional and home use. It also included some chamber music, didactic works, quite a few vocal scores of operas and operettas, also a limited amount of orchestral music in full score. He started by reprinting some of Cendrier's and most of Saint-Hilaire's and Cellerin's pieces. This is how, for example, one-act operas such as Victor Massé's Miss Fauvette (Mme. Cendrier, 1855), Louis Deffès's Les Bourguignonnes (Saint-Hilaire, 1863), or Léo Delibes's Les Eaux d'Ems (Cellerin, 1872) enter O'Kelly's catalogue.

As for his original publishing activity, O'Kelly mainly published music by young French talents, for which he was awarded a bronze medal at the Paris World Exhibition in 1878. In fact, the vast majority of the composers he published are today forgotten, exceptions being some works by Debussy's teacher Albert Lavignac (1846–1916) and some composers who enjoyed some popularity at their time such as Antoine Marmontel (1816–1898), Henri Duvernoy (1820–1906), Georges Mathias (1826–1910), Georges Pfeiffer (1835–1908), Alphonse Hasselmans (1845–1912), Théodore Lack (1846–1921) or Marie Jaëll (1846–1925).

Among the larger scores published by O'Kelly there are a number of operas (in vocal scores), ranging between 50 and 300 pages of content. Examples are Marc Chautagne's La Veuve Malbrough (1872), Ferdinand Poise's Les Trois souhaits (1873), Delphine Ugalde's Seule (1875), Adrien Talexy's Garçon de cabinet (1877), Joseph O'Kelly's La Zingarella (1878) and La Barbière improvisée (1884), Avelino Valenti's Embrassons-nous, Folleville (1879), Pauline Thys's Le Mariage de Tabarin (1885) and quite a number of voluminous scores in 1881 by the recently deceased Maurice Bourges who must have left a considerable amount of money behind to have his music published posthumously. Another large-scale vocal composition was the oratorio Agar (1875) by Georges Pfeiffer for soli, chorus and orchestra, which was published in full score. Other orchestral scores include a number of works by Anaïs de Perrin de Lange in 1877 and 1880, an 1880 reprint of the Fantaisie fantastique op. 12 (1856) by Ninette Nicolò, the third piano concerto, Op. 86 (1883) by Georges Pfeiffer and Stances for violin and orchestra (1887) by Jules Auguste Wiernsberger.

Like some other Paris publishers, O'Kelly brought out several series of music edited by prominent music teachers. The best-known and longest running was the École du Piano: Choix de Concertos des Maîtres. Premiers Solos, edited by Émile Decombes, a teacher at the Conservatoire, which reached 50 volumes between 1875 and 1888. Another was a series of works for trombone and piano, edited by Paul Delisse, and he took over a series called Les Maîtres Classiques du Violon, edited by Delphin Alard, that had previously appeared elsewhere.

On occasion, O'Kelly bought complete or partial catalogues from publishers who closed down. Thus he took over the publisher Fernand Schoen in 1877 and parts of Gambogi (1877), Aulagnier (1880) and Escudier (1882, including the piano music by Louis Moreau Gottschalk). He also had short-time partnerships with Ikelmer (1874 only), Rouget in Toulouse (1874–84), Lissarrague in Versailles (1877 only) and Naus in Paris (1880-1).

== Plate numbers ==
As it was usual among French music publishers in the 19th century, printed publications are not dated. Therefore, the plate numbers at the bottom of printed pages are a reliable hint at dating compositions. As a reference library, the Bibliothèque nationale de France operates a dépôt legal which obliged all French publishers to submit their works, and the library dated them.

O'Kelly's plate numbers begin with his initials, either "A.O.K." or "A. O'K.", in the early years sometimes "O'K" only. For the purpose of simplicity these are all generalised below as A.O.K.

1872: A.O.K. 1–94

1873: A.O.K. 95–133

1874: A.O.K. 134–160

1875: A.O.K. 161–267

1876: A.O.K. 268–337

1877: A.O.K. 338–701

1878: A.O.K. 702–753

1879: A.O.K. 754–819

1880: A.O.K. 820–879

1881: A.O.K. 880–941

1882: A.O.K. 942–1074

1883: A.O.K. 1075–1121

1884: A.O.K. 1122–1179

1885: A.O.K. 1180–1278

1886: A.O.K. 1279–1327

1887: A.O.K. 1328–1404

1888: A.O.K. 1405–1428

In a number of cases O'Kelly used other plate numbers than A.O.K. ones. Most refer to the initials of a composer's name, indicating that these are prints which were paid for by the composer and published at the composer's financial risk. Together with these prints O'Kelly's catalogue exceeded the number of 1,428 pieces suggested above, but amount to some 1,500.

== Bibliography ==
- Anik Devriès & François Lesure: Dictionnaire des éditeurs de musique français, vol. 2: De 1820 à 1914 (Geneva: Minkoff, 1988).
- Axel Klein: O'Kelly. An Irish Musical Family in Nineteenth-Century France (Norderstedt: BoD, 2014), chapter 4 (pages 215–234); ISBN 978-3-7357-2310-9.
