= Georges Pfeiffer =

French pianist and composer

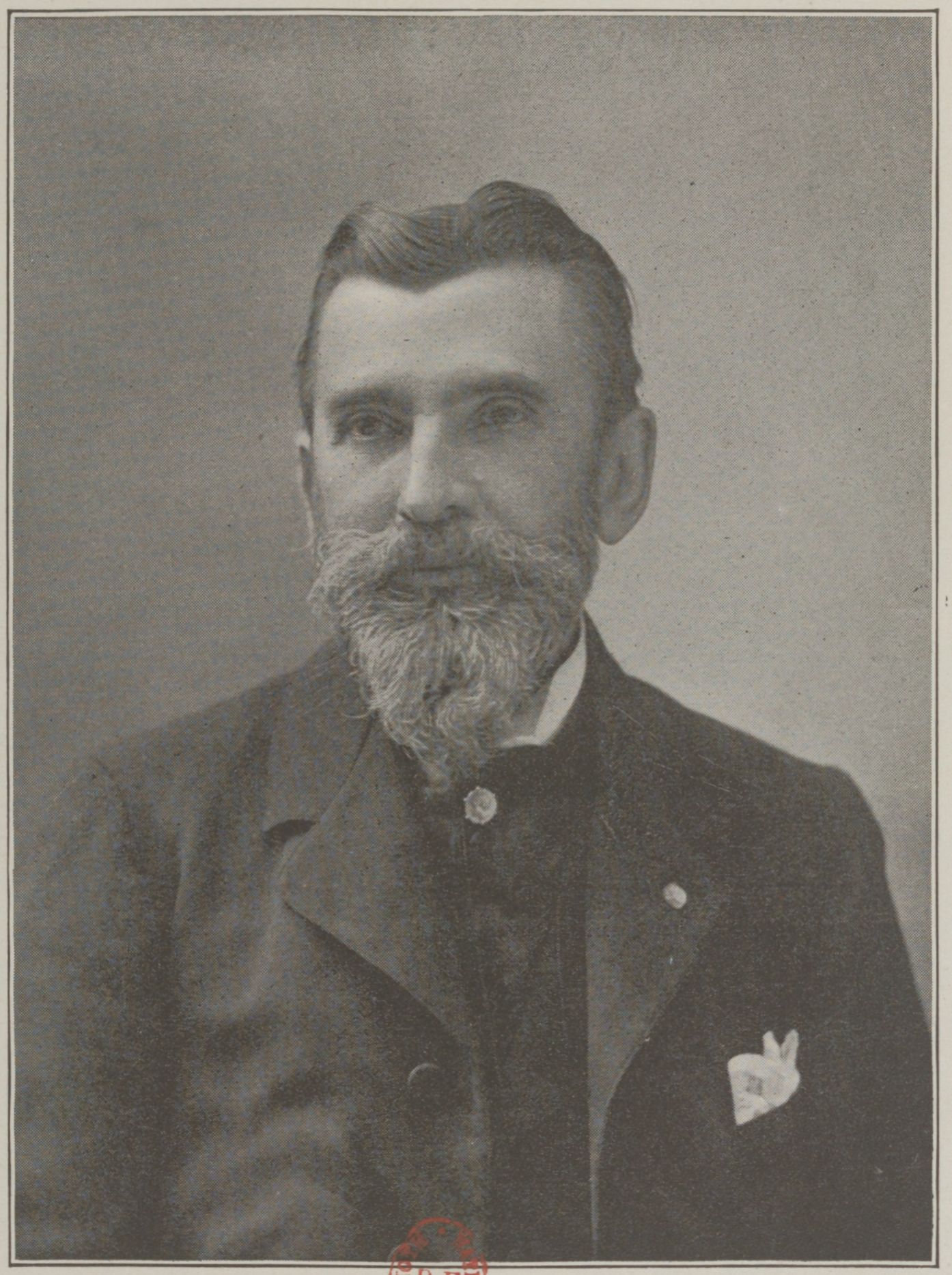
Georges Jean Pfeiffer

Georges Jean Pfeiffer (12 December 1835 – 14 February 1908) was a French composer, pianist, and music critic. He was a much sought-after chamber music partner in the second half of the nineteenth century in Paris.

== Life ==
Pfeiffer was born in Versailles. Both his grandfather and his father Émile were piano makers. His mother Clara had been a pupil of Frédéric Kalkbrenner and Henri Bertini; at his parents' home in Paris, the Pfeiffers were regular hosts to musical salon events. Pfeiffer received his piano tuition from his mother, and he studied composition privately with Pierre Maleden and Berthold Damcke.

In a self-organised concert in 1862, his operetta Le Capitaine Roche and the Piano Trio, Op. 14 were performed. At the London International Exhibition in the same year, Pfeiffer performed the piano part in his own Second Piano Concerto. Like his Franco-Irish friend Joseph O'Kelly, Pfeiffer was a partner in the piano and harp making firm Pleyel, Wolff, Lyon & Cie. Pfeiffer's piano work Babillage, Op. 74 is dedicated to O'Kelly's second wife, Marie. In mid- to late nineteenth-century Paris, he was much in demand as a pianist in chamber music events, performing in high-profile recitals with Pablo Sarasate, Auguste Franchomme, and others.

As a composer, Pfeiffer received several awards, including the Prix Chartier (for the Piano Quintet, Op. 41) and one by the Société des compositeurs de musique whose president he was. As a music critic, he wrote for the journals Voltaire and La Mode illustrée, also a number of longer articles for the Revue musicale.

== Music ==
Pfeiffer wrote four light operas, two ballet compositions, three piano concertos, a number of chamber and piano works, as well as pedagogical works. They were renowned for their refined melodic creativity and elegant classical forms. His "opéra bouffe" Le Légataire universel (1897) featured a number of sentimental arias reminding of operettas. Pfeiffer's music was favourably received by his contemporary audiences, but is now largely unperformed and forgotten.

== Selected works ==
=== Stage works ===
- Le Capitaine Roche, Op. 19 (libretto by Cléon Galoppe d'Onquaire), operetta in 1 act (1862)
- L'Enclume (Pierre Barbier), comic opera in 1 act (1884)
- Le Baron Frick (Ernest Depré, Clairville), operetta in 1 act (1885), written in collaboration with Ernest Guiraud, Victorin de Joncières, and Francis Thomé
- Le Légataire universel (Jules Adenis, Lionel Bonnemère, after Jean-François Regnard), "opéra bouffe" in 3 acts (1897)
- two ballets: Madame Bonaparte and Cléopâtre

=== Vocal music ===
- Agar (Paul Collin), "poème lyrique" for soloists, mixed chorus and orchestra (1875)
- Wilda (Édouard Guinand), "scène" for soprano and mixed chorus (1883)
- Villanelle et ronde champêtre(É. Guinand), for baritone and women's chorus (1889)

=== Orchestral music ===
- Piano Concerto No. 1, Op. 11 (1859)
- Piano Concerto No. 2, Op. 21 (1864)
- Jeanne d'Arc, Op. 43, symphonic poem (1872)
- Piano Concerto No. 3, Op. 86 (1883)
- Marine, Op. 131 for violin and orchestra (1893)
- Légende, subtitled Fantaisie symphonique, Op. 138 for piano, organ and orchestra (1894)

=== Chamber music ===
- Piano Trio in G minor, Op. 14 (1862)
- Cello Sonata, Op. 28 (1866)
- Piano Quintet in C minor, Op. 41
- Sonata for two pianos (1877)
- Violin Sonata, Op. 66 (1879)
- Sonata, Op. 76 (1881)
- Concertstück, Op. 120 for horn and piano (1889)

=== Piano music ===
- 1re Étude de salon, Op. 4 (1856)
- 3me Mazurka de salon, Op. 10 (1860)
- Roquefavour, feuillet d'album, Op. 15 (1862)
- 6 Romances sans paroles, Op. 27 (1865)
- Marguerite à la fontaine, Op. 29 (1866)
- Nocturne, Op. 36 (1869)
- Polonaise, Op. 39 (1869)
- Valse de salon, Op. 48 (1872)
- Berceuse, Op. 53 (1874)
- Morceau espagnol, Op. 61 (1877)
- Scènes de chasse, Op. 64 (1879)
- 25 Études servant de préparation aux études de Cramer, Op. 70 (1880)
- Ronde turque, Op. 72 (1880)
- Babillage, Op. 74 (1880)
- Gigue dans le genre ancien, Op. 77 (1881)
- Mon moulin, Op. 85 (1882)
- Paquerette, Op. 97 (1884)
- 2 Légendes, Op. 109 (1887)
- Sérénade tunisienne, Op. 111 (1887)
- Styrienne, Op. 112 (1887)
- Impromptu-Ballet, Op. 143 (1896)

=== Educational writings ===
- Enseignement du piano. Doigters simplifiés des gammes en tierces diatoniques et chromatiques (Paris: A. O'Kelly, 1882)
- "La Classe d'ensemble instrumental au Conservatoire", in: La Revue musicale, 3 February 1903, pp. 65–66
- "De l'interprétation des signes d'ornements chez les maîtres anciens", in: La Revue musicale, 15 September 1903, pp. 513–517
- "A propos de harpe", in: La Revue musicale, 1 February 1905, pp. 84–86
