= Charles-Édouard Lefebvre =

French composer (1843–1917)

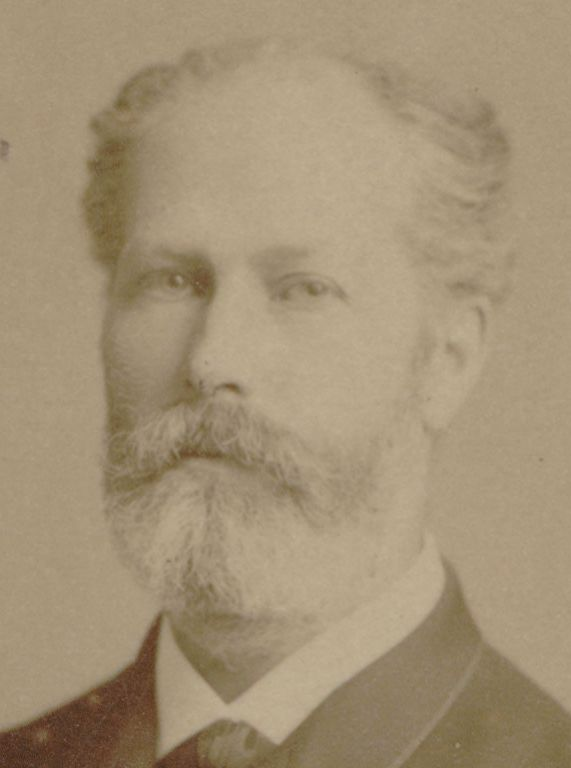
photograph of Charles Lefebvre

Charles-Édouard Lefebvre (19 June 1843 – 8 September 1917) was a French composer.

Lefebvre was born in Paris, the son of painter Charles Lefebvre, and studied with Charles Gounod and Ambroise Thomas at the Paris Conservatoire. In 1870, he was awarded the Prix de Rome together with Henri Maréchal (1842–1924) for the cantata Le Jugement de Dieu. He was awarded the Prix Chartier for his compositions twice, in 1884 and 1891. In 1895 he succeeded Benjamin Godard as director of the Paris Conservatoire's chamber music class. According to Elaine Brody's entry on him in The New Grove Dictionary of Music and Musicians (1980), "In his own words, he worked in pastels rather than oils." He died in Aix-les-Bains, Savoie, aged 74. He is buried in Pere Lachaise cemetery (division 18), in Paris.

== Works ==
- Le Jugement de Dieu (1870)
- Le Chant du cavalier (Duo for Cello (or Bassoon) and Piano (or Organ), 1876)
- op. 46: 3 Pièces (Duos for Cello and Piano, 1877)
- Lucrèce (opera, 1878)
- op. 53: Le Trésor (comic opera in 1 act, libretto by François Coppée, premiered 1883 in Angers)
- op. 57: Suite (for Flute, Oboe, Clarinet in Bb, Bassoon and Horn) (1884)
- op. 66: Zaïre (opera in 4 acts, libretto by P. Collin based on the homonymous play by Voltaire, premiered 1887 in Lille)
- op. 68: Méditation (for Organ and Orchestra, arranged for Harmonium, Piano, Violin and Cello in 1899 by A. Jeanbernat)
- Djelma (opera in 3 acts, libretto by Charles Lomon, premiered on May 25, 1894, at the Théâtre de l'Opéra in Paris)
- Andante (for 2 Celli, 1895)
- op. 98: Sonate pour violoncelle et piano (in a minor, dedicated to Mme. Félix Guyon, 1896)
- op.102: Dieu Pieces pour hatbois et piano (Andante et Allegro)
- op. 118: Fantaisie Caprice (for Clarinet in Bb and Piano)
- Psalm, for choir and orchestra
- Judith, lyrical drama
- Dalila, oratorium
- Melka, oratorium
- Eloa, oratorium
- Sainte-Cécile, oratorium
- La Fille de Jephthe, oratorium
- La Messe du Fantôme, oratorium
- Toggenburg, oratorium

== Bibliography ==
- Bio in Maîtres contemporains de l'orgue by Joseph Joubert, 1911.
