= Paul Wachs =

French composer

Paul Étienne Victor Wachs (19 September 1851 – 6 July 1915) was a French composer, organist and pianist. He is most remembered for his salon compositions for piano.

== Biography ==
Born in Paris, Wachs was the son of the French composer Frédéric Wachs (1825–1899). He was a student at the Conservatoire de Paris, where his teachers included François Benoist and César Franck for organ and Victor Massé and Antoine François Marmontel for composition.

After his studies, he became the second organist at the Church of Saint-Sulpice. In 1874, he left this position to be the choirmaster at the Church of Saint-Merri. This position had previously been held by Camille Saint-Saëns. He held this position until 1896. In 1908, Wachs bought a large property in Saint-Mandé, which he named Les Myrtles after one of his compositions. He lived there with his family until his death at age 63.

Among his works for piano, the most famous is Promenade à Âne.

== List of compositions ==
Alphabetical list based on IMSLP.

- Angélus
- Au matin
- Baliverne
- Les Blés sont mûrs
- Boléro
- Brin de paille
- Capricante
- Carillonnettes
- Chanson du rouet
- Cœur léger
- Deux Pièces pour orgue
- Dormez, Ninon!
- Douce gaîté
- Doux aveu
- Hosanna
- Le Joyeux rémouleur
- Le Kangourou
- Madrileña
- Marche triomphale
- Les Myrtes
- Le Pas des bouquetières
- Rose et papillon
- Te Deum
- Une Noce au village
- Valse interrompue
- Valse parisienne
