= Cléon Galoppe d'Onquaire =

French writer and playwright (1805–1867)

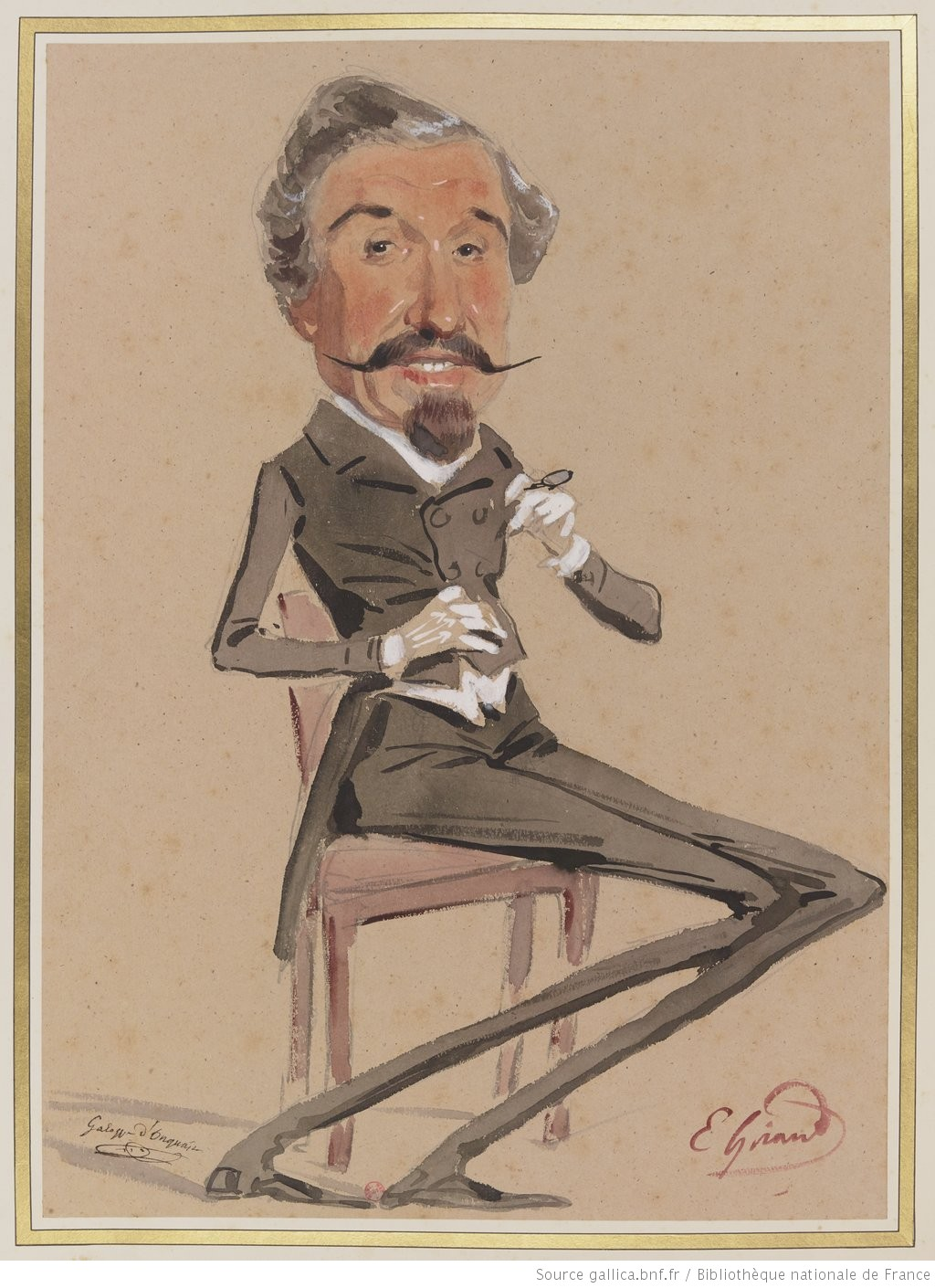
Cléon Galoppe d'Onquaire par Eugène Giraud

Pierre Jean Hyacinthe Adonis (or Antoine) Galoppe d'Onquaire (16 April 1805 – 9 January 1867) was a French writer and playwright.

== Career ==
He was born in Montdidier, the son of Louis-Joseph Hyacinthe Galoppe-Donquaire, a merchant draper. After a brief spell as a military officer, he became a writer, under the nickname his father had given him of "Cléon" Galoppe d'Onquaire. He also wrote poetry and articles in Mémoires de l'Académie de la Somme. He died in Le Vésinet.

He wrote opera libretti for Jean-Baptiste Weckerlin, including his setting of La Laitière de Trianon, a salon opera in 1 act. It is the best remembered, along with one song, "Ça fait peur aux oiseaux" from the operetta Bredouille, set to music by Paul Bernard (composer).

== Works ==
=== Poetry, as Cléon Galoppe d'Onquaire, or "Pétrus Noël" ===
- Fumée, 1838
- Feuilles volantes, 1839
- Le Whist, "poème didactique en 4 chants", 1841
- Mosaïque, 1842
- Le Siège de la Sorbonne, ou le Triomphe de l'Université, "Poème héroï-comique en six chants", 1844

=== Comedies ===
- Une Femme de quarante ans, verse comedy in 3 acts; Théâtre-français, 20 November 1844
- Jean de Bourgogne, verse drama in 3 acts, with Pitre-Chevalier; Théâtre-français, 7 February 1846
- Les Trois roses, 1849
- Les Vendeurs du Temple, "satire réactionnaire", 1849
- Le Château de Coetaven, sung comedy in 1 act, with Achille d'Artois and Charles de Besselièvre; Paris, Variétés, 24 March 1852
- Le Chêne et le roseau, "comédie-vaudeville", with A. Decourcelle; Paris, Théâtre Vaudeville, 21 November 1852
- L'Amour pris aux cheveux, "pochade" in 1 act; Paris, Palais-Royal, 6 November 1852
- Les Vertueux de province, comedy in 3 acts; Paris, Odéon, 3 October 1860
- Le Capitaine Roche, operetta in 1 act to music by Georges Pfeiffer, 1862
- Bredouille, operetta in 1 act to music by Paul Bernard, 1864 (unperformed?)
- La Mort de Socrate, comic opera in 1 act, 1864 (unperformed?)
- La Bourse ou la vie, comic opera, 1865 (unperformed?)
- L'Eau de jouvence, comedy in 1 act, 1865 (unperformed?)
- La Laitière de Trianon, opera in 1 act to music by Jean-Baptiste Weckerlin (unperformed?)

=== Other ===
- Les Fêtes de l'église romaine, avec l'explication de l'origine de chaque solennité (1854)
- Le Livre des sacrements, avec notice historique et poème sur chaque sujet (Paris: C. Maillet-Schmitz, 1857)
- Le Diable boiteux à Paris (Paris: Librairie nouvelle, 1858)
- Le Diable boiteux en province (Paris: Librairie nouvelle, 1858)
- Le Diable boiteux au village (Paris: A. Bourdilliat, 1860)
- Le Diable boiteux au château (Paris: Michel Lévy, 1863)
- Hommes et bêtes, physiologies anthropozoologiques mais amusantes (Paris: Amyot, 1862)
