= Prix Chartier =

French music award

The Prix Chartier (Chartier Prize) was a musical composition prize established in 1859 and awarded by the Académie des beaux-arts of the Institut de France. It was awarded annually from 1861 to 1942 and was intended to reward excellence in chamber music.

== History ==
This prize owes its name and existence to Charles-Hyacinthe-Suzain-Jean Chartier, a music lover living in the commune of Breteil, in the first arrondissement of Paris, who died on 7 July 1858. The funds came from the sale of autograph letters by Nicolas Poussin, purchased from Chartier by the Bibliothèque impériale. In his will, he wrote:

"I give and bequeath to the Academy of Fine Arts of the Institut de France an annual income of seven hundred francs, for one hundred years, in favor of the best works of chamber music, trios, quartets, etc., that most closely approach the masterpieces of this genre."

The bequest was validated by imperial decree on 15 January 1859 and formalized at the annual public meeting of the Académie des beaux-arts on 12 October 1861:

"The Academy, having had two of these annuities at its disposal this year, awarded on February 23 last the prize founded by M. Chartier to M. Charles Dancla, professor at the Imperial Conservatory of Music. At its meeting on September 28 last, it awarded this prize to Mme. Farrenc, professor at the Imperial Conservatory. It appreciated in M. Ch. Dancla's compositions an elegant, correct style, inspired by the best traditions; in those of Mme. Farrenc, several of whose works were applauded at the Conservatory's concerts, a lofty and masterful style."

The first two recipients were Charles Dancla, for the year 1860, and Louise Farrenc for 1861. Farrenc was also awarded the prize in 1869, and was one of only three women to receive the prize (along with Clémence de Grandval (1890) and Henriette Renié (1916)).

== See also ==
- Prix Rossini
