= Ernest Guiraud =

French composer and music teacher

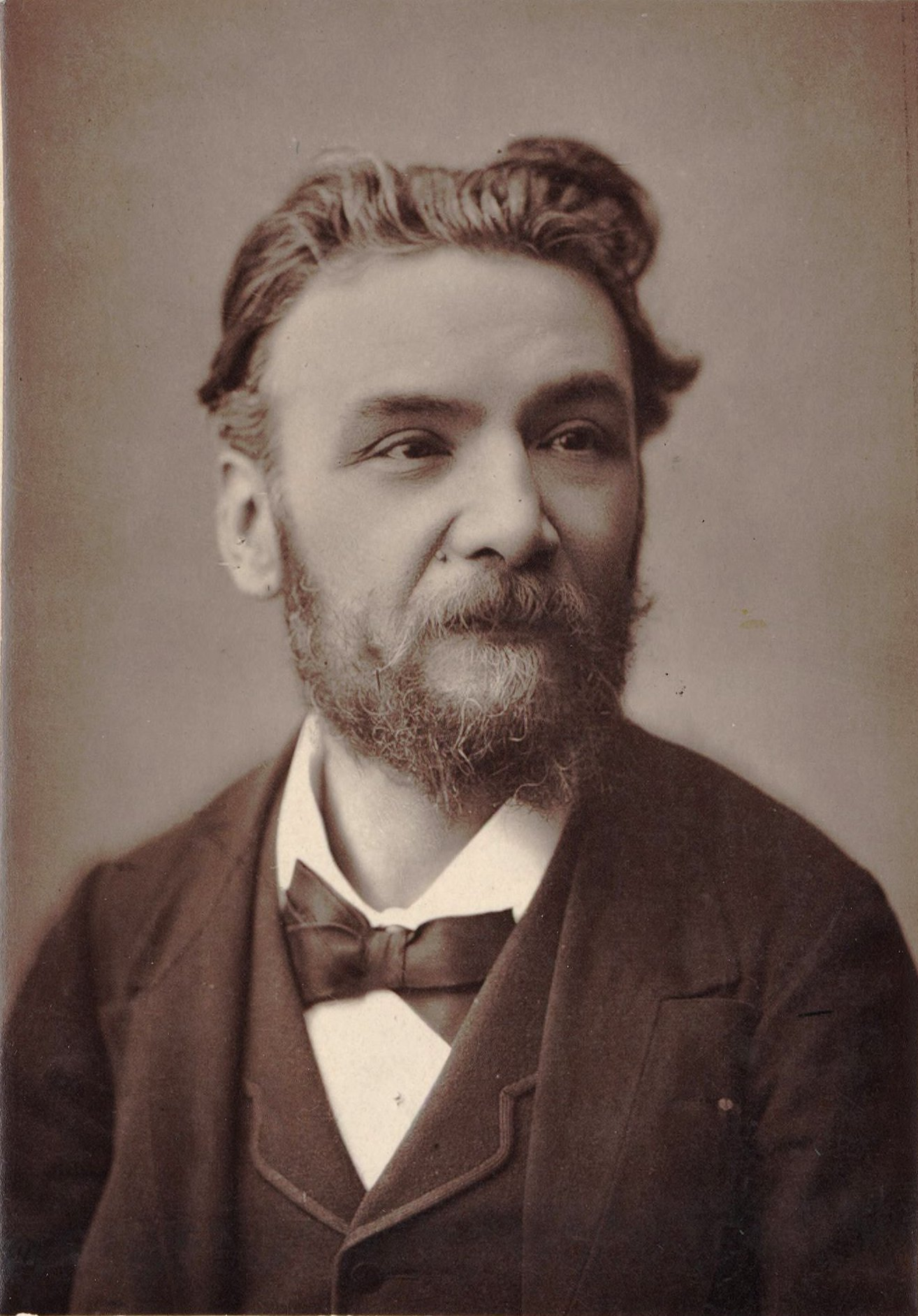
- Guiraud, photograph by G. Camus, c. 1890
- Born: 23 June 1837; New Orleans, Louisiana, US
- Died: 6 May 1892 (aged 54); Paris, France
- Occupations: Composer; Academic teacher

Ernest Guiraud (French: [ɛʁnɛst ɡiʁo]; 23 June 1837 – 6 May 1892) was an American-born French composer and music teacher. He is best known for writing the traditional orchestral recitatives used for Bizet's opera Carmen and for Offenbach's opera Les contes d'Hoffmann (The Tales of Hoffmann).

== Biography ==
Guiraud was born in New Orleans, Louisiana. He began his schooling in Louisiana under the tutelage of his father, Jean-Baptiste-Louis Guiraud, who had won the Prix de Rome in 1827. At age 15, he set to music a full-length libretto about King David, which he and his father had found on a trip to Paris. The result was David, an opera in three-acts, which had a resounding success at the Théâtre d'Orléans in New Orleans in 1853, sealing his future.

In December of the same year, Guiraud sailed back to France to continue his musical education. He studied piano under Marmontel and composition under Halévy at the Paris Conservatoire. Remarkably gifted as a student, he was awarded first prize for piano in 1858. He won the Prix de Rome the next year, notably, the only instance of both father and son obtaining this prize. He became close friends with Camille Saint-Saëns, Emile Paladilhe, Théodore Dubois, and especially Georges Bizet.

Guiraud entered his profession by writing one-act stage works that served as "curtain raisers" for evenings of theatrical entertainment. His first important stage work, Sylvie, which premiered at the Opéra Comique in 1864, was a popular success and established his reputation in Paris. In August 1870, the impact of the Franco-Prussian War hit Paris while his opéra-ballet Le Kobold was only 18 days into its run. All of the theaters closed their doors. Guiraud enlisted in the infantry and fought for France to the war's end in 1871.

Although Guiraud's primary interest was the composition of operas, most of them were not a success. Madame Turlupin (1872) was a succès d'estime, but it was hampered by an old-fashioned libretto. Piccolino, his three-act opéra comique first performed in 1876, represents the peak of his career. An appealing sorrentino sung by Célestine Marié, known as Galli-Marié, and a brilliant and effective ballet entitled Carnaval (a movement from his "First Orchestral Suite") enabled the work to achieve a long run. However, the opera was never revived.

After Bizet's death, Guiraud collected Bizet's original scores and arranged the frequently performed L'Arlésienne Suite No. 2. He also arranged twelve numbers from Bizet's opera Carmen into two Carmen Suites. Guiraud is perhaps most famous for constructing the recitatives—both beloved and criticized—that replaced the spoken dialogue in performances of Carmen for more than a century. He also wrote the recitatives and completed the score of Jacques Offenbach's masterpiece Les contes d'Hoffmann (The Tales of Hoffmann) which was left unfinished at Offenbach's death. Guiraud's version was very popular but it was not exclusively performed because Offenbach left an enormous number of sketches that various composers and arrangers have used to make their realisations of the opera.

The amount of Guiraud's own musical output is small, probably due to his desire to help his friends as well as demands from his teaching career. Of his compositions in other forms, his ballet Le Forgeron de Gretna Green, given at the Salle Le Peletier of the Paris Opéra (5 May 1873), Caprice for violin and orchestra (1885), and Chasse fantastique, a symphonic poem (1887), are best known. (He also made a popular piano arrangement, for four hands, of Saint-Saëns's Danse macabre.) Beginning in 1876, Guiraud taught at the Paris Conservatoire. He was a founding member of the Société Nationale de Musique and the author of a treatise on instrumentation. In 1891, Guiraud was elected member of the Académie des Beaux-Arts and was appointed professor of composition at the Conservatoire to replace Victor Massé. Guiraud's teaching methods for harmony and orchestration were highly respected and recognized in musical circles. His musical theories had a strong and beneficial influence on Claude Debussy, whose notes were published by Maurice Emmanuel in his book devoted to Pelléas et Mélisande. André Bloch, Mélanie Bonis, Paul Dukas, Achille Fortier, André Gedalge and Erik Satie are also counted among his students. There have been rare revivals of his final opera Frédégonde, in Ho Chi Minh City in 2017 and at Oper Dortmund in 2021 and 2022.

Guiraud devoted the years 1891 and 1892 to completing the orchestration for Kassya, a five-act opera by Léo Delibes. However, it was left unfinished due to his own death in Paris at age 54.

== Operas ==
- David, opéra (3 acts, after A. Soumet & F. Mallefille: Le roi David), first performed (f.p.) 14 April 1853, Théâtre d'Orléans, New Orleans, USA.
- Gli avventurieri, melodrama giocoso (1 act), ms. 1861, unperformed.
- Sylvie, opéra comique (1 act, J. Adenis & J. Rostaing), f.p. 11 May 1864, Opéra-Comique (second Salle Favart), Paris.
- Le Coupe du roi de Thulé, opéra (3 acts, L. Gallet & Blau), ms. 1869-69, unperformed.
- En prison, opéra comique (1 act, T. Chaigneau & C. Boverat), f.p. 5 March 1869, Théâtre Lyrique, Paris.
- Le Kobold, opéra-ballet (1 act, Gallet & Charles-Louis-Etienne Nuitter), f.p. 26 July 1870, Opéra-Comique (Favart), Paris.
- Madame Turlupin, opéra comique (2 acts, E. Cormon & C. Grandvallet), f.p. 23 November 1872, Théâtre de l'Athénée, Paris.
- Piccolino, opéra comique (3 acts, Sardou & Nuitter, after Sardou), f.p. 11 April 1876, Opéra-Comique (Favart), Paris.
- Le Feu, opéra (Gondinet), incomplete, f.p. 9 March 1879, Paris.
- Galante Aventure, opéra comique (3 acts, L. Davyl & Silvestre), f.p. 23 March 1882, Opéra-Comique (Favart), Paris.
- Le Baron Frick (Ernest Depré, Clairville), operetta in 1 act (1885), written in collaboration with Georges Pfeiffer, Victorin de Joncières, and Francis Thomé.
- Frédégonde, drame lyrique (5 acts, Gallet, after A. Thierry: Les récits des temps mérovingiens), incomplete; Acts 1–3 orch. by Paul Dukas, Acts 4–5 & ballet completed by Camille Saint-Saëns; f.p. 18 December 1895, Opéra at the Palais Garnier, Paris.
