= Herman Bemberg =

German-Argentine composer

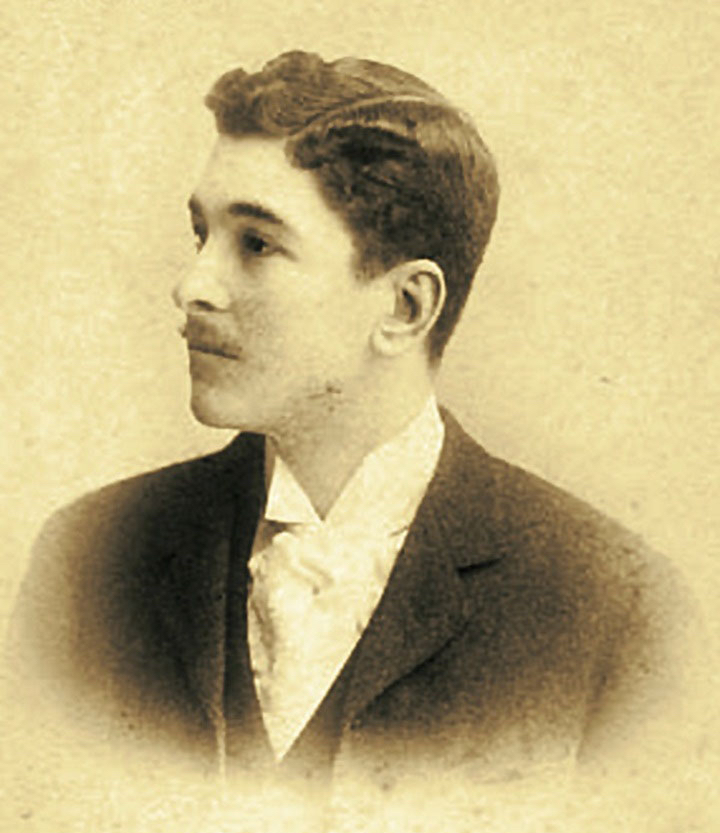

Herman Emanuel Bemberg Ocampo (29 March 1859 – 21 July 1931) was a German-Argentine composer.

== Life ==
He was born in Paris (or most probably in Buenos Aires) of German Argentine parents (Otto Bemberg 1827–95 and Luisa Bernabela Ocampo Regueira 1831–1904) and studied at the Paris Conservatoire, under Massenet, whose influence, with that of Gounod, is strongly marked in his music. He won the Rossini Prize in 1885. As a composer, he was known by numerous songs and pieces for the piano, as well as by his cantata La Mort de Jeanne d'Arc (1886), the comic opera Le Baiser de Suzon (1888), and the grand opera Elaine (produced at Covent Garden and starring the great Australian soprano Nellie Melba in 1892).

Among Bemberg's songs the dramatic recitative Ballade du Desespere was well known, and Chant Hindou was quite popular and frequently included in anthologies. He died in Bern, Switzerland.
