= Zulema Garcia Olsen =

American musician and composer

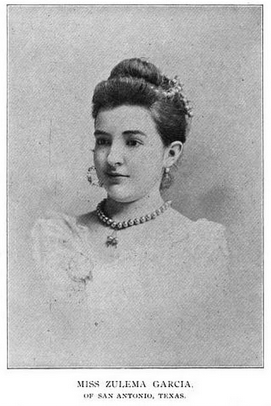
Zulema Garcia, from an 1891 publication.

Zulema Garcia Olsen (1873 — April 1907) was an American musician and composer, and represented "Spanish Texan" women at the World's Fair in Chicago in 1893.

== Early life ==
Zulema Garcia was born in San Antonio, Texas, the daughter of Jose Maria Garcia de Villarreal and Florencia Leal de Garcia. Her father was a landowner and rancher on the Mexican border. Her mother's Leal ancestors came from the Canary Islands.

She was declared a musical prodigy by the local newspaper, and by her first instructor, R. G. Guerrero, in 1884. Her first composition came at age 11, when she wrote "Un Suspiro", a waltz. At age 13, she wrote a military march. She studied music in Paris with Antoine François Marmontel. While a student in Paris, she performed at the Mexican embassy.

== Career ==
Garcia was known as a pianist, a violinist and a composer. Her compositions included "Our Wedding March" (performed at her own wedding); "The Columbian March (Columbus Landing in America)," which was performed by John Philip Sousa's band at the World's Columbian Exposition in Chicago; "On the Death of Prince Napoleon", "The Spring Palace Waltz", and "The Mockingbird". She represented "Spanish Texans" on the State Board of Lady Managers for the Texas World's Fair Exhibit Association, the organization tasked with creating a state display at the World's Columbian Exposition in 1893. She was the youngest Lady Manager appointed from any state. She performed at a dinner with the Mexican National Band in Chicago in 1892, with many dignitaries of the Exposition present. English writer and Texas newspaperman Henry Ryder-Taylor dedicated a song, "The Snake Ring Song", to Zulema Garcia in 1895.

== Personal life ==
Zulema Garcia married J. J. Olsen in 1896. In their eleven years of marriage, they had seven children. On their wedding day, Garcia walked down the aisle while her composition “Wedding March” played. She had composed the piece for the occasion and it is her last known composition. Zulema Garcia Olsen was 33 years old at the time of her death from typhoid fever in April 1907. Some of her photographs and papers are archived with the Garcia-Smith Family Collection at Texas A&M University in Kingsville, Texas.
