= George O'Kelly =

Franco-Irish pianist and composer (1831–1914)

George Alexandre O'Kelly (12 October 1831 – 2 September 1914) was a Franco-Irish pianist and composer, who spent much of his career in Boulogne-sur-Mer. A member of a family of musicians, he was the only one with several orchestral scores to his credit. Another notable work is an opera on an Irish theme, performed in Boulogne in 1878.

== Life ==
George O'Kelly was born as George Alexandre Kelly in Boulogne-sur-Mer. Unusually, his first name was spelled in the English way (without an 's' at the end). His father was an Irish emigrant, the Dublin-born pianist Joseph Kelly (1804–1856); his brothers included the composer Joseph O'Kelly (1828–1885) and the music publisher Auguste O'Kelly (1829–1900). Around 1835, when he was still very young, the family moved to Paris where he grew up in the Faubourg Poissonnière area of the 9th arrondissement. Nothing is known of his musical education, but it can be presumed that he received early lessons from his father and later some more advanced training from others. His earliest public record is his membership in the 'Association des Artistes Musiciens', where he is listed in the annual membership lists for the years 1848–52. For the last three of these years he was listed as pianist employed at the Théâtre Historique (1850–1) and its successor, the Théâtre Lyrique (1852).

Together with another brother, the business man Charles (Frédéric) O'Kelly (1830–1897), he returned to Boulogne-sur-Mer in 1852 and established himself there as a piano teacher and composer/performer. An 1851 concert review mentioned his impending move to Boulogne: "O'Kelly est une jeune pianiste qui est venu se fixer ici, et qui est arrivée précédé d'une reputation qui la soirée de lundi n'a fait que justifier". Frequently, George was involved in the activities of the local Société Philharmonique. In 1853, he seems to have persuaded the local music shop of B. Filliette to publish his first two piano compositions. Other early scores were an Overture (1853) for orchestra, performed by Société Philharmonique in April 1853, and the opera Une Nuit au bal, performed at the Théâtre Municipal in December 1853.

George married a widow with two sons in January 1856 and had two sons of his own, born in 1858 and 1860. For many years, the family lived in the historic walled town centre of Boulogne, in Rue du Puits d'Amour (1861–mid-1870s) and Rue de la Balance (until c.1881). In 1871, two works for piano and orchestra were performed in Boulogne, but his largest works were two scores, both performed in September 1878 on the occasion of the laying of the foundation stone to the new deep-sea harbour of Boulogne. One was the one-act comic opera Le Lutin de Galway and the other the cantata Le Port en eau profonde for baritone, chorus and orchestra. Although both works were well received by the press they were not taken up again in the following years. Seeking more artistic success may therefore have been one of the reasons why he moved back to Paris around 1881.

Although he had a number of performances of small-scale compositions in Paris, and although his brother Auguste published many of his songs and piano works, establishing himself in the highly competitive environment of Paris proved difficult. He ran a small Académie Artistique in the Ternes area of the 17th arrondissement, and the dedications on his published works indicate that he had a number of wealthy pupils. Yet, step-by-step he moved out of the city, probably due to increasing rents. Having been widowed in 1884, he married again in the same year. His works of the 1890s were self-published, and in his last creative years (1903–9) his compositional activity focused on music for children that was published in magazines such as the Journal des demoiselles and for which he wrote both music and words. He spent his last years in the Paris suburb of Asnières-sur-Seine, where he died in 1914.

== Music ==
As a composer, George O'Kelly always stood in the shadow of his brother Joseph, to the extent that some of his works were perceived as works by the latter. For instance, Le Lutin de Galway appears in some contemporary operatic catalogues as a work by Joseph O'Kelly. This work plays in 18th-century county Galway in Ireland, although the plot is not particularly Irish. Unfortunately, the music has not survived, so it is not possible to say whether there were any Irish influences in the score. George was the only member of the O'Kelly family in France, who wrote orchestral music, but this music, too, does not seem to have survived.

His published music includes 26 works for piano (dating 1853 to 1909) and 24 songs (1874 to 1909). His early piano music is quite attractive, although it quite strictly follows established role models (sonata form). It is in a romantic language and includes polkas, mazurkas, waltzes and marches. His most ambitious piano work is the Marche funèbre (1876), an extended work written in memory of his father. He clearly developed stylistically: his Folâtres gazelles op. 20 (published in 1904), for instance, sounds as if influenced by Scott Joplin.

Although he performed with singers from the early 1850s, George O'Kelly's songs constitute a considerably later part of his worklist, the earliest pieces appearing in 1874. He took a while to develop, his best vocal music can be found in Le Camoëns mourant (1880) and his 1890s settings of poems by Alphonse de Lamartine and François Coppée. For Le Camoëns mourant, a work commemorating the anniversary of the Portuguese poet Luis de Camões, he was awarded the Brazilian national order of merit, the Order of the Rose. His last songs are attractive little miniatures that appeared in children's journals, often to his own words.

== List of works ==
Opera

- Une Nuit au bal (libretto by Antoine Obert), 1 act, performed Boulogne-sur-Mer, Théâtre Municipal, 24 December 1853.
- Le Lutin de Galway (libretto by Ernest Deseille and Henri Bauhin), 1 act, performed Boulogne-sur-Mer, Théâtre Municipal, 9 September 1878.

Voice and orchestra

- À l'oasis (Émile Lafarge) for baritone and orchestra (1854)
- Le Port en eau profonde for baritone, chorus and orchestra (1878)

Orchestral

- Ouverture (1853)
- Fantaisie sur le Pré-aux-Clercs for piano and orchestra (1871)
- Marche triomphale for piano and orchestra (1871)

Piano music

- Deux Pensées caractéristiques: 1. Nocturne; 2. Tarantelle. Boulogne-sur-mer: B. Filliette & Paris: A. Grus, 1853 (No. 1 B.F. / No. 2 B.F.)
- Étude-galop (1856). Unpublished.
- Bathilde. Mazurka. Paris: Mme Cendrier, before 1857
- Valse de salon (1857). Unpublished
- Souvenirs de Paraguassú. Fantaisie op. 4. Paris: Choudens, 1860 (A.C. 687)
- Matinée de printemps. Valse op. 5. Paris: Saint-Hilaire, 1861 (E.St.H. 127)
- Triste adieu. Mélodie [pour piano] op. 6. Paris: Saint-Hilaire, 1862 (E.St.H. 197)
- Prière op. 7. Paris: Saint-Hilaire, 1863 (E.St.H. 251)
- Souviens-toi. Rêverie op. 8. Paris: A. O’Kelly, 1873 (A.O.K. 142)
- Harmonie des bois op. 9. Paris: A. O’Kelly, 1874 (A.O.K. 155)
- Au moulin. Caprice op. 10. Paris: A. O’Kelly, 1874 (A.O.K. 157)
- Après le combat. Marche triomphale op. 11. Paris: A. O’Kelly, 1875 (A.O.K. 200)
- Le Casino du Ploegsteert. Polka op. 12, Paris: A. O’Kelly, 1875 (A.O.K. 264)
- Marche funèbre op. 13. Paris: F. Schœn, 1876 (F.294.S.)
- Danse des Crénées (Nymphes des fontaines). Mazurka op. 14. Paris: A. O’Kelly, 1878 (O. 737)
- Sentiers perdus. Grande valse de salon. Paris: A. O’Kelly & Naus, 1880 (A.O.K. 873)
- La Kalenda. Danse des nègres. Caprice op. 15. Paris: A. O’Kelly, 1884 (A.O.K. 1142)
- Six Petites pièces faciles op. 16. Paris: A. O’Kelly, 1887 (A.O.K. 1384). Contains: Le Sommeil de bébé. Berceuse; Les Petits bataillons. Marche; La Leçon de aïeule. Gavotte; Mariquita et Periquito. Boléro; Chant du petit gondolier. Barcarolle; Danse des pantins hongrois. Caprice
- Folâtres gazelles. Bluette op. 20, Paris: Journal des Demoiselles, 15 Sep. 1904
- Lointain souvenir. Paris: Journal des Demoiselles, 1 July 1907
- Caprice-Boléro. Paris: Journal des Demoiselles, 1 Feb. 1909
- Caprice-Gavotte. Paris: Journal des Demoiselles, 15 May 1909

Songs for voice and piano

- Rapelle-toi. Mélodie (Alfred de Musset), Paris: A. O’Kelly, 1874 (A.O.K. 137)
- Stances au soleil (Henri Bauhin), Paris: A. O’Kelly, 1877 (A.O.K. 683)
- Surrexit. Chant de Pâques (Désirée Pacault), Paris: A. O’Kelly, 1880 (A.O.K. 840)
- Le Camoëns mourant. Élégie (Désirée Pacault), Paris: A. O’Kelly, 1880 (A.O.K. 860)
- Le Vieux drapeau (René Asse), Paris: A. O’Kelly, 1883 (A.O.K. 1113)
- O salutaris (biblical), Paris: A. O’Kelly, 1884 (A.O.K. 1153)
- Autant dire. Mélodie (Louise d’Ernesti Bader), Paris: A. O’Kelly, 1886 (A.O.K. 1304)
- Sur un album (Alphonse de Lamartine), Paris: Journal des Demoiselles, Aug. 1892
- Ave Maria (biblical), Paris: Mackar et Noël, 1894 (M.&N. 1585)
- La Harpe des cantiques (Alphonse de Lamartine), Paris: F. Laurens, 1895 (G.O.)
- Le Livre de la vie (Alphonse de Lamartine), Paris: [no name of publisher], 1896; also Paris: Journal des Demoiselles, 15 March 1905
- Notre drapeau! Chant patriotique (L. Reyne), Paris: F. Laurens, 1898 (G.O'K.)
- Juin (François Coppée), Paris: F. Laurens, 1901 ([G.O'K.])
- Dans la nuit calme et pure. Valse Rêverie (A. Deval), Paris: Journal des Demoiselles, 15 Nov. 1903
- Quel ennui de travailler (A. Deval), Paris: Journal La Poupée Modèle, 15 Dec. 1903
- Noël. Conte primitif, d'après la princesse Bruhyères (Pierre Meissonnier), Paris: l'auteur, 1904
- En offrant un rameau bénit. Mélodie (George O'Kelly), Paris: E. Costil, 1904 (G. O'K)
- Le Sillon (G. O’Kelly), Asnières-sur-Seine: La Ruche d'Asnières, 1904
- Après la dinette ... on dansera! (G. O'Kelly), Paris: Journal La Poupée Modèle, 15 June 1904
- La Révolte des poupées (G. O'Kelly), Paris: Journal La Poupée Modèle, 15 Dec. 1904
- Mon Minet (G. O'Kelly), Paris: Journal La Poupée Modèle, 15 Feb. 1906
- Le Sommeil (G. O'Kelly), Paris: Journal des Demoiselles, 15 Sep. 1906
- Je suis en pénitence! (L. Reyne), Paris: Journal La Poupée Modèle, 15 Feb. 1908
- Une Petite fille a sa poupée. Gronderie Maternelle (G. O'Kelly), Paris: Journal La Poupée Modèle, 15 Nov. 1909

== Bibliography ==
- Axel Klein: O'Kelly. An Irish Musical Family in Nineteenth-Century France (Norderstedt: BoD, 2014), ISBN 978-3-7357-2310-9.
