= Désirée Pacault =

French poet and composer (1798–1881)

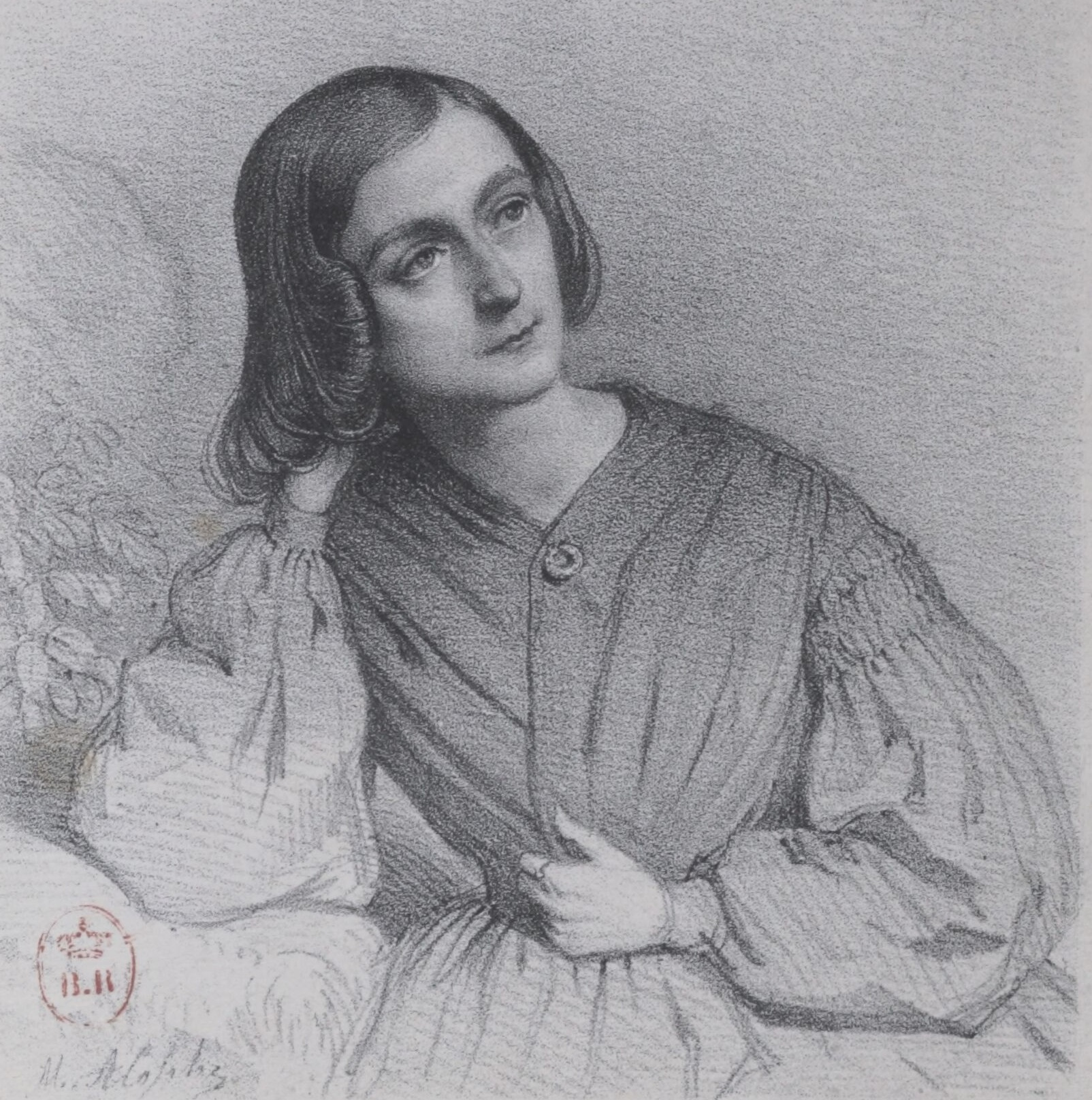
- Born: 29 January 1798; Beaune, France
- Died: 25 January 1881 (aged 82); 17th arrondissement, Paris, France
- Occupations: Poet; composer; journalist; author

Désirée Pacault (29 January 1798 – 25 January 1881) was a French poet, composer, journalist and writer.

== Biography ==
Pacault was the daughter of a rhetoric professor, Désirée Pacault was born in Beaune on the 11th pluviôse of the Year 6.

Based at the Hôtel d'Aligre, at 123 rue Saint-Honoré in Paris, in 1825 she sold the book Le Participe français mis à la portée de tous les âges, written by the schoolteacher A. Riby and reissued in 1829. She obtained a bookseller's patent on 18 July 1828 and published in 1831 the prospectus Écho littéraire, album poétique.

Member in 1831 of the Athénée des arts, sciences et belles lettres de Paris, in 1832 of the Société d'enseignement universel, she intervened on 29 October 1832 during a literary evening of the Athénée des arts to read one of her texts entitled "L'Inspiration".

In 1837, she wrote a poem in honour of the marriage of Duke of Orléans and Hélène of Mecklenburg-Schwerin. In December, she replaced Théodore Poupin as editor-in-chief of La Capricieuse, journal des modes parisiennes, where she gave more space to reviews of shows. In 1838, she was a literary critic for the magazine La France littéraire.

Member in 1839 of the academies of sciences in Vienna and of letters in Florence, in 1840 of the Academy of Sciences of Siena (first female member), in 1846 of the Society of Artist Musicians of Paris, she obtained in 1842 a silver medal from the Society Racinienne for a cantata in honour of Racine. Freemason, she set some of her poems to music, such as "C'était les ciels", which she dedicated to the lodge Les Amis fidèles de l'Orient de Paris. · She also composed art songs ("mélodies" on poems by Alphonse de Lamartine and Jean Reboul.

An ode to Luís de Camões that she wrote, set to music by George O'Kelly, was sung at a literary and artistic festival organized in Paris on 10 June 1880, for the three-hundredth anniversary of the death of the Portuguese poet.

She died in Paris on 25 January 1881, at 47 Rue des acacias in the 17th arrondissement.
