= L'Art musical =

L'Art musical was a French music magazine founded in 1860 by Léon Escudier, which was published until 1894.

== History ==
L'Art musical was founded in 1860 by Léon Escudier, with the collaboration of Oscar Comettant. Initially a weekly publication, it became monthly and then bi-monthly from 1884 to 1893, before reverting to a weekly format.

It was published in Paris from 6 December 1860, to 27 September 1894, with an interruption of several months between August 1870 and January 1872 due to the Franco-Prussian War of 1870-71.

The journal's director was Léon Escudier until his death in 1881. L'Art musical was then taken over by the Girod publishing house, and Paul Girod became its director until December 1883, when Alphonse Leduc, of Éditions Leduc, succeeded him. Leduc remained director until his death in 1892. During Leduc's tenure, the editor-in-chief was Henri Jahyer.

Upon Leduc's death in 1892, the journal's management announced its discontinuation in June, but publication continued from October 1892 to July 1893 under the title "Bulletin périodique des Nouveautés musicales" (Periodic Bulletin of Musical Novelties), appearing quarterly. Leduc's widow, Emma Ravina-Leduc, daughter of the pianist Jean-Henri Ravina, took over the management of the company. From 14 September 1893, L'Art musical was published again in weekly format until October 1894, when it was absorbed by the Belgian weekly Le Guide musical.

== Contents ==
L'Art musical's motto was "Progress," and its ambition was to be "a friendly force" in the artistic arena, driven solely by the desire to serve the interests of art without bias or pedantic scholasticism. The musicologist Adélaïde de Place notes that the journal particularly championed "major causes stirring the musical world, such as the decentralization of opera or the development of popular classical music concerts."

Each issue of the journal included reviews of operas and concerts, one or more feature articles, news items, and advertisements. For Adélaïde de Place, L'Art musical thus offers "a remarkable panorama of the period: in-depth articles, historical or organological articles, reviews of theaters and concerts, obituaries, analyses of new works, legal chronicles, sections on musical life abroad, news from the Paris Conservatory, schools, choral societies and military music, commentaries on exhibitions, the publisher L. Escudier's catalog, etc.".

Oscar Commetant, Léon Escudier, and Paul Girod were major contributors. Among the topics covered by their writing were articles on Danish music and musicians, the management of French opera houses and the use of dissonant harmony, reviews of Bizet's Carmen, the Cairo premiere of Verdi's Aida, performances of Verdi's Requiem at the Théâtre-Italien and in London, obituaries, writings on the Concours de Rome, the reform of the Paris Conservatory, the creation of the Théâtre-Lyrique, and reviews of concerts and operas. Under Leduc's guidance, L'Art musical also took an interest in Russian music.

Other contributors to the journal included Achille de Lauzières de Thèmines, a prolific writer of articles, Arthur Pougin, Edmond Neukomm, and Franz de Villars.

== Sources ==
de Place, Adélaïde (2003). "Art musical, L'". In Fauquet, Joël-Marie (ed.). Dictionnaire de la musique en France au XIXe siècle. Fayard. p. 63. ISBN 2-213-59316-7.
