= Gustav Lange =

German composer (1830–1889)

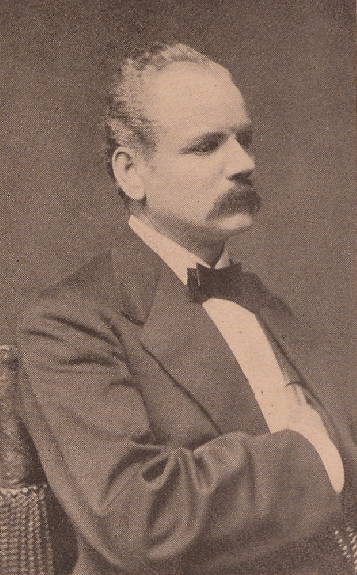
Image of Gustav Lange

Gustav Lange (13 August 1830 – 20 July 1889) was a German composer known mainly for his melodious salon music for the piano.

== Life ==
Lange was born in Schwerstedt, near Erfurt, Prussian Saxony, in 1830. He received initial musical training from his father on the piano and organ, followed by conservatory studies in piano, organ, thorough bass, and composition – probably at the Royal Institute for Church Music in Berlin. His teachers included August Wilhelm Bach, Eduard Grell, and Albert Löschhorn.

He lived for many years in Berlin and died at Wernigerode in 1889.

== Music ==
Encouraged by the success of some 1860s compositions, Lange produced a large number of works, most of which were light and popular piano pieces, of which he wrote around 500. Edelweiss op. 31 and Blumenlied op. 39 (alternatively known as Flower Song in English) are perhaps two of his best-known works today.

A contemporary English source says: "Many of these pieces are very pleasing and pretty in character, but they are not marked by any very striking features".

== Selected compositions (piano) ==
- Lamentation d'une jeunne fille op. 10
- Farewell! op. 15
- Prière à la Madonne op. 17
- Fête militaire op. 18
- Le Retour de soldat op. 19
- Sehnsuchtsklänge op. 20
- Die Libelle op. 24
- Jägerfahrt op. 26
- Dolorosa op. 28
- Edelweiß op. 31
- Blumenlied op. 39
- Fischerlied op. 43
- Langage d'amour op. 45
- Au bivouac op. 47
- Fleurs fanées op. 48
- Minnelied op. 51
- Einsame Tränen op. 52
- Hortensia op. 53
- Dein Eigen op. 54
- Liebesahnung op. 75
- Heidenröslein op. 78
- Aus Herzensgrunde op. 85
- Blumenmärchen op. 93
- Immortellen op. 94
- Mein Sohn, wo willst du hin so spät? Op.165

(Arrangement of Felix Mendelssohn's Winterlied (No.3) from 6 Gesänge, Op.19a for single piano)

- Drei Fantasie-Transkriptionen über Opernarien von G. Meyerbeer op. 207
- Offenbach-Fantasien op. 208
- Valse mélancholique op. 210
- Zwei Waldidyllen op. 211
- Vier Lieder von Anton Rubinstein frei übertragen op. 212
- Fantasie-Transkriptionen über drei Lieder von Franz Abt op. 213
- Paraphrase über die Schlummerarie aus der Oper 'Die Stumme von Portici' von D.F.E. Auber op. 214
- Paraphrase über die Romanze der Ines aus der Oper 'Die Afrikanerin' von G. Meyerbeer op. 215
- Fantasie-Polonaise nach Motiven von B. Bilses beliebter Königs-Polonaise op. 216
- Drei Fantasie-Transkriptionen über Lieder und Arien von W.A. Mozart op. 217
- Die Maccabäer op. 237
- Das goldene Kreuz op. 254
- Der Landfriede op. 255
- Sérénade irlandaise op. 409
- Melitta op. 417
- Almröschen op. 418
- Im Ahnenschloss op. 419
- Blumenklage op. 420
- Begegnung auf der Alm op. 421
- Les Pages de la Reine op. 422
- Aus der Kindheit frohen Tagen op. 427
- Frohes Wandern op. 428
- Die Lotosblume op. 429
- Marguerite op. 430
- Lieb' Mütterlein op. 431
- Marcella op. 432
- L'Adieu op. 433
- Gitanella op. 434
- La Danse au Tyrol op. 435
- Après le travail op. 436
- Plaisirs de l'automne op. 437
- Im Zwielicht op. 445
- Von Zweig zu Zweig op. 447
- Graziosa op. 448
- Sérénade du gondolier op. 451
- La jeunne fille de Pologne op. 453
- Liebesreigen op. 455
- Gavotte favorite op. 457
- Heckenrosen op. 462
- Les Grenadiers du Roi op. 464
- Marche des Mineurs op. 474
- Calme-toi! op. 475
- La Petite flatteuse op. 480
- Jour de répos op. 485
- Fleur printanière op. 487
- Danse des fleurs op. 489
- Folâtrerie op. 491
- Les Mois de roses op. 493
