= Berthold Damcke =

German conductor and composer (1812–1875)

- Born: February 6, 1812
- Died: February 15, 1875 (aged 63)
- Occupations: Composer; conductor; music educator and critic
- Instrument: Piano

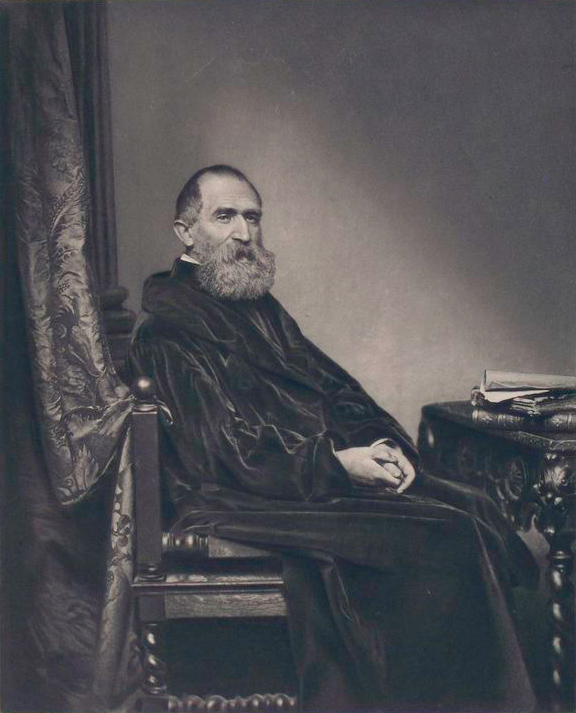
Berthold Damcke after a photograph by Pierre Petit, engraved by P. Dujardin

Berthold Damcke (6 February 1812 – 15 February 1875) was a German composer, pianist, conductor, music educator, music critic and newspaper correspondent.

== Life ==
Damcke was born in the so-called "French period" in Hannover. He first studied theology and later music in Frankfurt as a pupil of Aloys Schmitt who was appointed court organist and chamber musician of the Duke Adolph von Cambridge in Hanover in 1826 as well as Ferdinand Ries. In 1834, Damcke made an appearance in his hometown "[...] probably for a short time" as violist in the Kingdom of Hanover court orchestra, which at that time still existed in the Schlossopernhaus and was located in the east wing of the Leineschloss. However, he continued to study the piano and organ, also composing his first choral works.

Later, Damcke moved to Bad Kreuznach where he conducted the local Musikverein and the Liedertafel and wrote the Oratorio Deborah. In 1837, Damcke went to Potsdam, where he conducted the Philharmonische Gesellschaft Potsdam as well as the Gesangsverein für Opernmusik, with which he performed his Christmas Oratorio in 1840 and in the following year the Psalm 23 as well as an Ave Maria. Also still in 1841, Damcke took over the position of conductor in Königsberg. There, his opera Das Käthchen von Heilbronn after Heinrich von Kleist was premiered in 1845. (Note: Notwithstanding this, up to this point there have been considerable deviations and/or additions to Damcke's vita in contemporary sources such as the stays in Berlin and the award of a gold medal for art; see, for example, Carl Friedrich von Ledebur: Tonkünstler-Lexicon Berlin's from the oldest times to the present. Unchanged reprint of the original edition, Ludwig Rauh, Berlin 1861; H. Schneider, Tutzing/Berlin 1965, p. 103; online on Google Books)

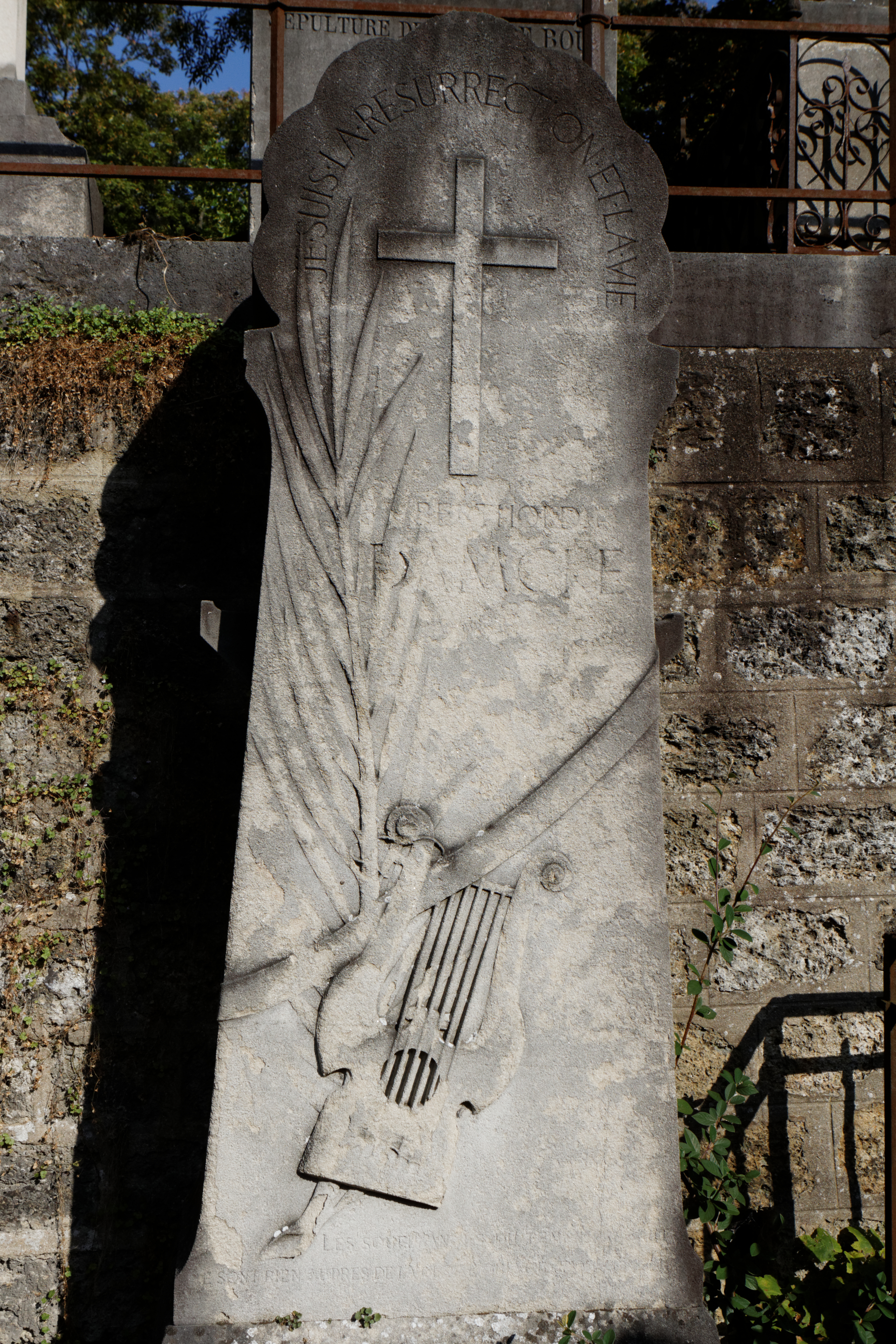
Damcke's grave at Père Lachaise Cemetery in Paris

In 1845, Damcke went to St. Petersburg as a piano teacher, where he also developed a rich activity as a sensitive music critic and wrote extensive articles for the German-language St. Petersburgische Zeitung. In 1855, he moved to Brussels. From 1859, Damcke lived and worked in Paris, where he wrote for various German and Russian journals. He also worked as a teacher, both privately and at the Conservatoire de Paris. One of his private pupils was Georges Pfeiffer. Damcke was friends with Hector Berlioz whom he had sponsored and whom he had already met in 1847 on the occasion of his guest performance in St. Petersburg. In Paris, he also taught under the later patronage of Fanny Pelletan, who conceptually developed the complete edition of Christoph Willibald Gluck's works, suggested by Berlioz, and presented its first three volumes, on which Damcke collaborated.

Damcke died in Paris at age 63 and is buried at Père Lachaise Cemetery.

== Bibliography ==
- Carl Friedrich von Ledbur: Tonkünstler-Lexicon Berlin’s von den ältesten Zeiten bis auf die Gegenwart. Unchanged reprint of the original edition by Ludwig Rauh, Berlin 1861, H. Schneider, Tutzing/Berlin, 1965, p. 103f.; online
- Grove Dictionary of Music and Musicians 5, p. 171 (with a catalogue of works)
