= Francis Thomé =

French pianist and composer

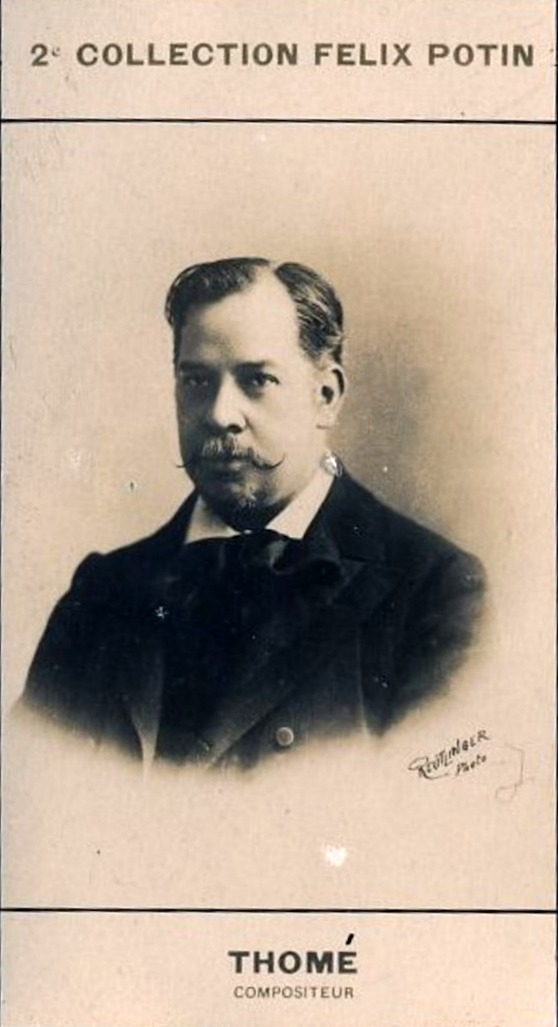
Portrait c. 1909

Francis Thomé (18 October 1850 – 16 November 1909), was a French pianist and composer.

He was born in Port Louis, Mauritius, and studied at the Paris Conservatoire with Jules Duprato and Ambroise Thomas. After leaving the Conservatoire, he became well known as a composer of salon pieces and was in demand as a pianist and teacher. His music was particularly successful in the French provinces, and two of his operas were first performed outside Paris. He became popular towards the end of the 19th century as a composer of accompanied poems, but is also known for his stage works, which encompassed various genres, including ballet, pantomime, incidental music (for a wide range of plays), bluettes, and operettas, such as Le Baron Frick (1885), the latter collaboration with Ernest Guiraud, Georges Pfeiffer, and Victorin de Joncières.

== Sources ==
- Article by David Charlton in the New Grove Dictionary of Opera, edited by Stanley Sadie (London, 1992). ISBN 0-333-73432-7 and ISBN 1-56159-228-5
