= Marc Delmas =

French composer (1885–1931)

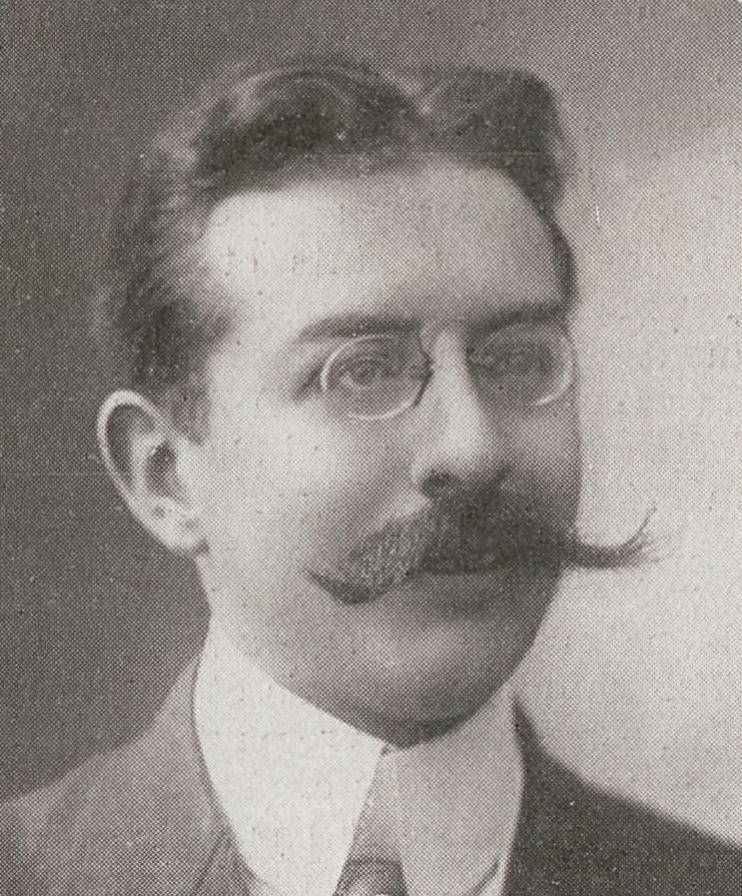
Marc Delmas

Marc Marie Jean Baptiste Delmas (28 March 1885 – 30 November 1931) was a French expressionist composer and writer.

== Life and career ==
Marc Delmas was born in Saint-Quentin, Aisne, France, and studied at the Conservatoire de Paris with Xavier Leroux and Paul Vidal. He won the Prix Rossini in 1911 with Anne Marie, Second Grand Prix de Rome with his cantata Le et la Fée Poète and later the Prix Cressent and Prix Ambroise-Thomas. In 1914 Delmas and Marcel Dupré were tied for first prize on the first ballot of the Prix de Rome, and Camille Saint-Saëns was called in to break the tie. He voted for Dupré, and Delmas took second prize.

Delmas taught music in Paris, and was a biographer of noted musicians. He took part in the choral movement and participated in the Conseil Superieur de la Musique Populaire. He died in Paris at the age of 46.

== Works ==
Delmas was a prolific composer, known primarily for his stage works, but he was also author of choral, solo and chamber music. Selected works include:

- Laïs, opera 1908
- Sylvette, operetta 1932
- Camille, opera comique
- Balade féerique for French Horn and piano
- Promenade for Clarinet and Piano (1920)
- Lusacienne, rhapsody for violin and orchestra (1928)
- Choral et Variations Op.37 for trumpet and piano
- Messe de requiem
- Le Masque for solo voice
- Fantaisie Italienne for clarinet and piano

His music was used in the film The Little Thing in 1923, and recorded and issued on CD including:

- Recital Favorites for Clarinet and Piano by Eugene Bozza, Gabriel Grovlez, Andre Bloch, Philippe Gaubert and Marc Delmas (2005)
- Musique Française pour Cuivres et Piano by Andre Chpelitch, Marc Delmas, Henri Dutilleux, Pierre Gabaye and Pierick Houdy (2007)
- Solos de Concours II: Music from the Premier Prix by Charles-Marie Widor, Arthur Coquard, Charles Edouard Lefebvre, Max D'Ollone and Marc Delmas (2005)

Delmas also wrote books including:

- Gustave Charpentier et le Lyrisme Francais (1931)
- Georges Bizet, 1838–1875 (1930)
