= Léon Escudier =

French journalist and music publisher (1821–1881)

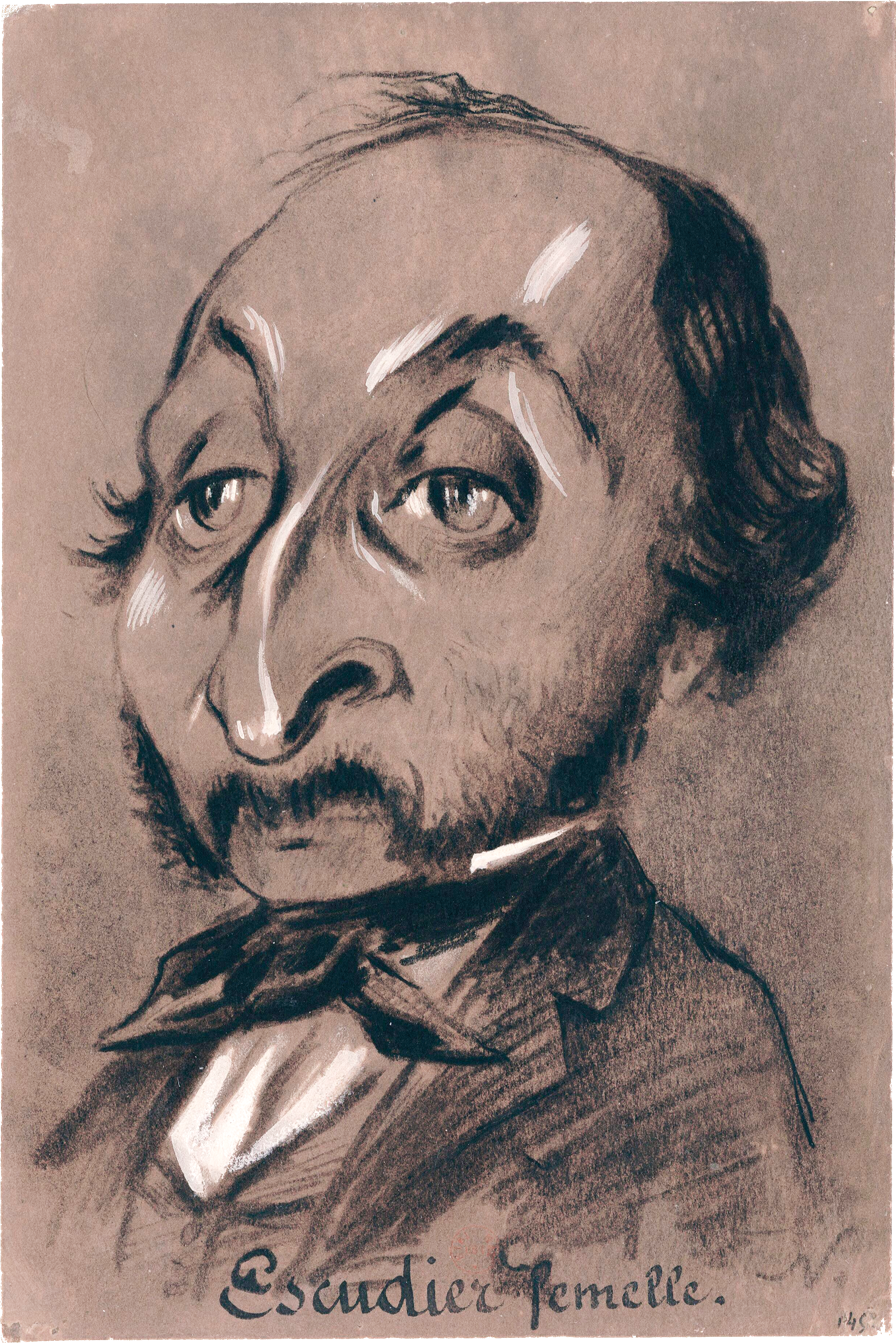
Caricature of Léon Escudier in the 1850s by Nadar

Jacques Victor Léon Escudier (17 September 1821 – 22 June 1881) was a prominent French journalist, music critic and music publisher.

== Career ==
Escudier was born in Castelnaudary. In 1837, together with Marie Escudier, his brother, and Jules Maurel he founded the weekly La France musicale as well as a music publishing company. In December 1860, he founded the journal L'Art musical. From 1850 to 1858, he worked for Le Pays and Journal de l'Empire.

Escudier was the French publisher of Giuseppe Verdi's works. All Verdi's works were apparently included in the Escudier catalogue. The Escudier brothers helped to establish Verdi's reputation across Europe as the leading composer of Italian opera.

From 1876 to 1878, Léon Escudier directed the Théâtre italien de Paris at the Salle Ventadour, where he staged some of Verdi's operas. On 22 April 1876 he mounted the first Paris production of Verdi's Aida, with elaborate sets and top singers, at a cost of 120,000 francs. Verdi was present and supervised the rehearsals.

He wrote, in collaboration with his brother, Études biographiques sur les chanteurs contemporains (1840), Dictionnaire de musique (1844), Vie et aventures des cantatrices célèbres (1856), and his autobiography, Mes souvenirs (1870).

After he died in Paris, his catalogue came up for auction and was bought by a range of French music publishers including E. & A. Girod, Louis Gregh, Léon Grus, Georges Hartmann, Henri Heugel, Auguste Le Bailly, Alphonse Leduc, Henry Lemoine, and Auguste O'Kelly.
