= Paul Bernard (composer) =

French composer

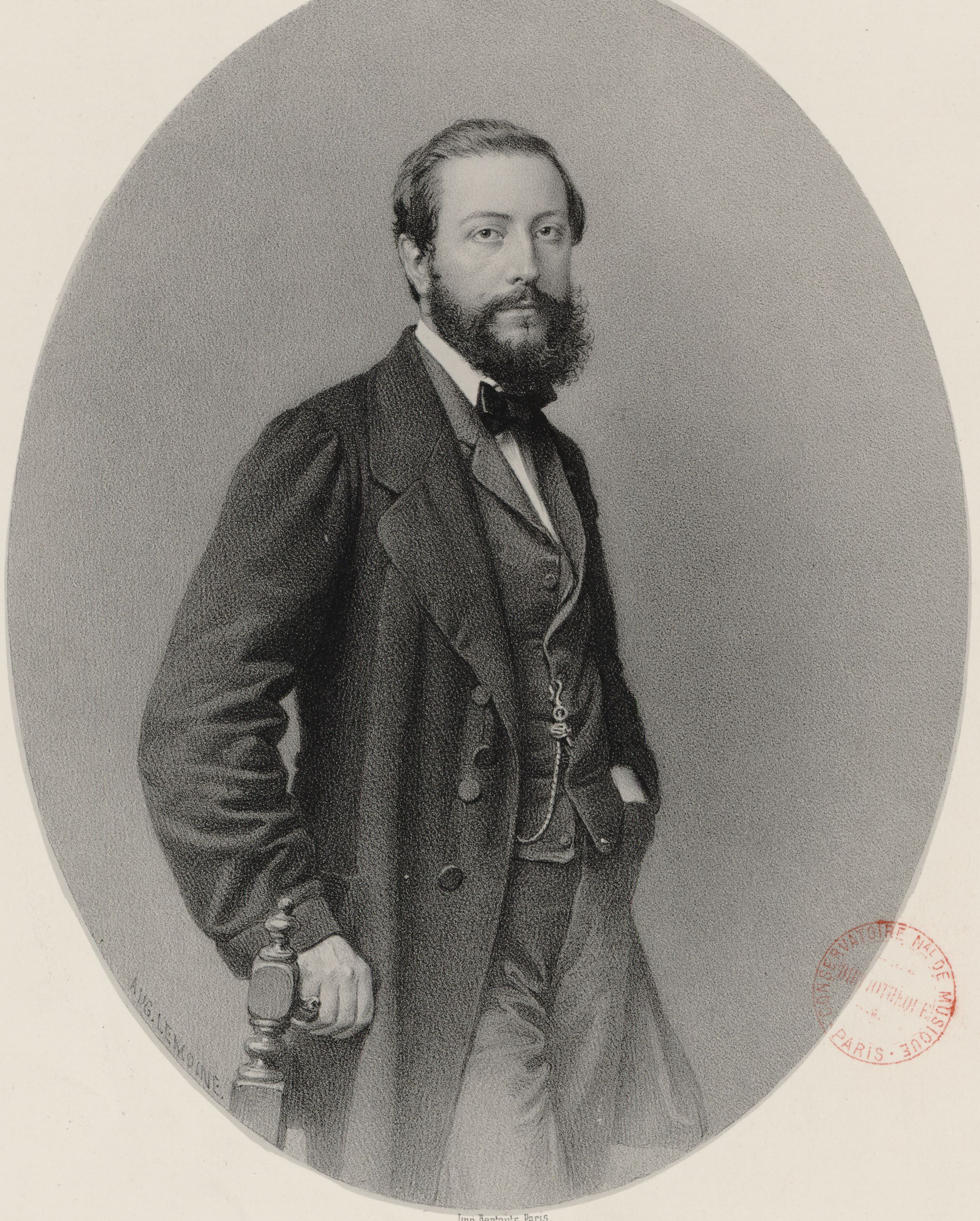
Paul Bernard Portrait

Paul Bernard (1827–1879) was a French composer.

His best remembered work is the song "Ça fait peur aux oiseaux" from the operetta Bredouille, to a libretto by Galoppe d'Onquaire (1805–1867).

Songs composed my Paul Bernard:

A

- Air danois, Op.89
- L'amour captif

B

- Badinage, Op.27
- La ballade du page, Op.47
- Ballade, Op.110
- Barcarolle et chanson de 'Fortunio', Op.61

C

- Ça fait peur aux oiseaux, Op.108
- Capriccio, Op.104
- La carriole
- La chanson du puits
- Le chant des feuilles, Op.35
- Charmant caprice
- Consolation, Op.66

D

- Le départ des conscrits, Op.36

E

- Les elfes, Op.25
- Essais pour le piano
- 3 Etudes Caractéristiques
- Evohé

F

- Fantaisie de salon No.1 sur 'Le château de la Barbe-bleue', Op.20
- La faucheuse
- Fleurs et pleurs, Op.36
- Fontaine aux perles, Op.31

G

- Grande valse de salon, Op.86

H

- L'hirondelle du clocher, Op.33

I

- Impromptu, Op.111

L

- Lolita

M

- Marche aux lampions
- Marche ottomane, Op.100

N

- La noisette

O

- L'oiselet et l'amour

P

- Piano Sonata, Op.28
- Plaintes à l'amour

Q

- Quand on s'adore

R

- Romanza, Op.106

S

- Sérénade, Op.39
- Souvenez-vous, Op.88
- Styrienne originale variée, Op.93
- Suite concertante sur 'L'oca del Cairo', Op.91
- Suite Pittoresque No.1
- 2 Suites concertantes sur 'Don Juan', Op.85
- 2 Suites concertantes sur 'Mignon', Op.90
- Sylvana, Op.103

T

- Tarentelle, Op.101
- Transcription variée sur 'La légende de Saint Nicolas', Op.83
