= Joseph O'Kelly =

Irish composer and pianist in France (1828–1885)

Joseph O'Kelly (29 January 1828 – 9 January 1885), composer, pianist and choral conductor, was the most prominent member of a family of Irish musicians in 19th- and early 20th-century France. He wrote nine operas, four cantatas, numerous piano pieces and songs as well as a limited amount of chamber music.

== Life ==
O'Kelly, the first child of the Dublin-born piano teacher Joseph Kelly (1804–1856) and his wife Marie Duval (1803–1889), was born as Joseph Toussaint Kelly on 29 January 1828 in Boulogne-sur-Mer. Of his four brothers, two also became notable musicians: the music publisher Auguste O'Kelly (1829–1900) and the composer and pianist George O'Kelly (1831–1914).

Around 1835 the family moved to Paris, where they lived at various addresses in the Faubourg Poissonnière area of the 9th arrondissement. Joseph received his early musical training from his father. As a foreign national he was not allowed to attend the Paris Conservatoire, instead he continued his education on the piano with George Alexander Osborne (1806–1893) (before 1844) and Frédéric Kalkbrenner (1785–1849) (mid-1840s) and in composition with Victor Dourlen (1780–1864) and Fromental Halévy (1799–1862). His earliest published compositions date from 1847. He has always used the name O'Kelly in his public appearances, although the official change of name from Kelly to O'Kelly did not occur before January 1859 when all brothers O'Kelly took this step simultaneously before a 'Tribunal Civil' in Boulogne-sur-Mer. Until 1855, his vocal output consisted exclusively of salon romances; after a break in vocal writing he returned in the 1860s with a series of settings of poems by Victor Hugo. In these considerably more ambitious pieces he dispenses with a strophic structure, employs more dramatic development and some technically advanced piano writing. His music for piano solo is altogether more ambitious and was influenced not only by his piano teachers Osborne and Kalbrenner, but also by Field, Berlioz and particularly Chopin, whom he greatly admired. With influences such as these, O'Kelly did not belong to the modernists in French music, which contributed to his early neglect. Nevertheless, his music is always tastefully written, technically demanding and rewarding for performers.

Throughout his life O'Kelly showed a keen interest in opera. All of his nine operas are one-act comic operas, four of which were published. Stella (1859) was expressly written as a salon opérette, but his best-known works were La Zingarella (1878, libretto by Jules Adenis and Jules Montini), performed in February and March 1879 at the Opéra Comique in Paris, and La Barbière improvisée (1882, libretto by Paul Burani and Jules Montini), performed in April and May 1884 at the Bouffes-Parisiennes. Of his four cantatas, the first, Paraguassú (1855, Théâtre Lyrique), was the most extended piece, dealing with a 16th-century episode from Brazil, for which he was awarded with the Knighthood of the Order of the Rose by the Brazilian emperor Don Pedro II. The third, the Cantate des Irlandais de France au Centenaire d'O'Connell, to words by another Franco-Irishman, the Viscount O'Neill de Tyrone, was performed in excerpts at the O'Connell Centenary in Dublin in 1875 – the only instance when O'Kelly visited Ireland. The fourth, Justice et Charité (1878) was a commission to celebrate the renovation of the chapel at the Castle of Versailles. Although O'Kelly never assumed French citizenship, according to J.P. Leonard, he "didn't speak a word of English". Yet he clearly identified himself as Irish: the change of name in 1859 is one proof for it, but he was also a member of the 'Anciens Irlandais' community of Irishmen in France and composed works relating to Ireland such as the Mac-Mahon Marche op. 41 (1871) and an Air irlandais op. 58 (1877). He also dedicated several of his works to members of the Irish community in Paris.

Besides the 1859 award from Brazil, O'Kelly was also decorated with Portugal's national order of merit, the Order of Christ (in 1865) and became a Chevalier of the Légion d'Honneur in 1881. Joseph O'Kelly died of bowel cancer on 9 January 1885 in Paris, in the apartment of his brother George in the 17th arrondissement. Camille Saint-Saëns played the organ at his funeral mass in the church of St. Ferdinand. He was buried on the Cimetière de Passy, but the grave is no longer extant. One of his sons, Henri O'Kelly (1859–1938), became a noted pianist, organist and composer.

== Compositions ==
For details of performances, publications, dedications etc. see the O'Kelly Catalogue of Works (OKC), Appendix 2 in Klein (2014; see References below)

Operas

- La Chasse du roi. Opéra-comique 1 act (Théodore Labourieu) (1849), unpublished
- Stella. Salon opérette, 1 act (Jules Montini) (1859), unpublished
- L'Arracheuse de dents. Opérette (Bernard Lopez) (1868), unpublished
- Ruse contre ruse. Opéra comique, 1 act (Michel Carré) (1873), Paris: Journal des demoiselles (1873 + 1877)
- Le Mariage de Martine. Opérette (text author?) (1874), unpublished
- La Zingarella. Opéra comique en 1 acte (Jules Adenis, Jules Montini), Paris: A. O'Kelly (A.O.K. 748) (1878)
- Les Secondes noces de bourgmestre. Opéra comique (text author?) (1881), unpublished
- Bibi-tapin. Opérette, 1 act (Auguste Erhard) (1882), unpublished
- La Barbière improvisée. Opéra comique, 1 act (Paul Burani, Jules Montini) (1882), Paris: A. O'Kelly (A.O.K. 1159) (1884)

Choral music

- Paraguassú: Chronique brésilienne. Poème Lyrique en trois parties (Junius de Villeneuve), for S, A, T, B, chorus, orch (1855), Paris: Choudens (1855), libretto published Paris: Bolle-Lassalle (1855)
- Gloire aux Gaulois. Chœur pour quatre voix d’homme (Gustave Chouquet), Paris: Gambogi frères (G.G. 1507) (1863)
- Chant du travail (text author?), ttbb (1863), unpublished
- Berceuse brésilienne (text author?), Bar, ttbb (1867), unpublished
- 1° Cantate (‘pour le fête de S. M. l’Impératrice’) (Bernard Lopez) (1867), unpublished
- Cantate des Irlandais de France au Centenaire d’O’Connell (François-Henry Viscount O’Neill de Tyrone, incl. translations from Thomas Davis and Thomas Moore) (1875), unpublished
- Noël. Cantique avec accompt. d’orgue & chœur ad libitum (Jules Montini), Paris: A. O'Kelly (A.O.K. 322) (1876)
- Justice et Charité. Cantate réligieuse (Eugène Adenis) (1878), unpublished

Songs

- L'Heure fatale. Duo (Jules Montini) (1847), unpublished.
- Fleur d'Andalousie (Ludovica Delestra Regnault), Paris: Bernard Latte (1848)
- Floritta (L. Delestra Regnault), Paris: E. Mayaud (E.M. 3065) (1849)
- La Gitana (L. Delestra Regnault), Paris: E. Mayaud (E.M. 3137) (1849)
- Rêverie. Mélodie (L. Delestra Regnault), Paris: E. Mayaud (E.M. 3138) (1849)
- L'Heure du soir. Mélodie (Théodore Labourieu), Paris: E. Mayaud (E.M. 3139) (1849)
- Il faut partir. Romance dramatique (Victor Doinet), Paris: E. Mayaud (E.M. 3168) (1849)
- La Fleur du Moine. Mélodie (author unknown), Paris: E. Mayaud (1849)
- Un Ange. Mélodie (Jules Montini), Paris: J. Meissonnier fils (J.M. 995) (1850)
- Tout par amour (Jules Montini), Paris: J. Meissonnier fils (J.M. 1038) (1851)
- Celle que j'aime tant. Romance (L. Delestra Regnault), Paris: E. Mayaud (E.M. 3167) (1851)
- Ne me dis pas jamais (Jules Montini), Paris: J. Meissonnier fils (J.M. 1060) (1851)
- Un Souvenir. Mélodie (Jules Montini), Paris: J. Meissonnier fils (J.M. 1198) (1854)
- Mes bluets. Romance (author unknown), Paris: Journal des Demoiselles (1855)
- Album de la Légion d’Honneur (Jules Montini): 1. Chantez toujours. Ariette; 2. Les Frères soldats. Romance; 3. Le Papillon. Mélodie; 4. La Fille du ciel. Historiette; 5. Qui vent trop prouver. Chansonnette; 6. Les Étoiles. Nocturne à deux voix égales; Paris: J. Meissonnier fils (J.M. 1240 – 1245) (1855)
- La Légende du colibri (Junius de Villeneuve), Paris: Choudens (A.C. 340) (1856)
- Vieille chanson du jeune temps (Victor Hugo), Paris: Gambogi frères (G.G. 1393) (1862)
- Faisons un rêve. Mélodie (Victor Hugo), Paris: Gambogi frères (G.G. 1807) (1866)
- Les Adieux de Valentin. Chanson (Henri Murger), Paris: E. Heu (E.H. 271) (1866)
- Tristesse d’Olympio. Méditation (Victor Hugo), Paris: Choudens (A.C. 1320) (1866)
- À une mère. Mélodie (Victor Hugo), Paris: H.L. d’Aubel (H.L. 127) (1867)
- Chanson d’une mère (Alfred des Essarts), Paris: Ch. Gambogi et Cie. (G.G. 2044) (1869)
- Dernier chant! (Victor Hugo), Paris: Ch. Gambogi et Cie. (G.G. 2045) (1869)
- Hymne au printemps. Mélodie avec accompagnement d’orgue ab libitum (Amédée Burion), Paris: Ch. Gambogi et Cie. (G.G. 2051) (1869)
- Sous les branches. Mélodie (François Coppée), Paris: Ch. Gambogi et Cie. (G.G. 2123) (1870)
- Stances à l'immortalité (Alfred de Musset), Paris: Au Ménestrel, Henri Heugel (H. 4016) (1871)
- Clair de lune. Méditation (Paul Juillerat). Paris: Au Ménestrel, Henri Heugel (H. 4042) (1871)
- En avril (André Theuriet), Paris: G. Hartmann (G.H. 496) (1872)
- Le Rhin allemand (Alfred de Musset), Paris: A. O'Kelly (1872)
- Ne touchez pas à la France (Bernard Lopez), Paris: A. O'Kelly (A.O.K. 64) (1872)
- La Voix de l'heure (Edouard Turquety), Paris: A. O'Kelly (A.O.K 85) (1873)
- Le Nid (Paul Celieres), Paris: A. O’Kelly (A.O.K. [s.n.]) (1874)
- Trois Mélodies (1: Hosannah!, 2: Séguidille, 3: C'est toi que j'aime) (Edouard Turquety), Paris: A. O'Kelly & Versailles: Lissarague (A.L. 26–28) (1876)
- Madrid (Alfred de Musset), Paris: A. O'Kelly (A.O.K. 408) (1877)
- Aurore (Edouard Turquety), Paris: A. O'Kelly (A.O.K. 700) (1877)
- En mer (Joséphin Soulary), Paris: A. O'Kelly (A.O.K. 701) (1877)
- Le Nid de la fauvette (Charles Cabot). Paris: L. Bathlot (L.B. 1803) (1878)
- Valse des fleurs. Chantée dans la Barbière Improvisée (Paul Burani, Jules Montini), Paris: A. O'Kelly (A.O.K. 1159[5.]) (1884)
- Adieu (Alfred de Musset) (n.d.)
- Agnus Dei (biblical), Paris: A. O'Kelly (A.O.K. 1160) (1884)
- L'Immortalité de l'âme (text author?), Paris: Au Ménestrel, Henri Heugel (1884?)
- Six Mélodies (1: C'est le printemps [Louis Tiercelin], 2: Une Chanson pour toi [Auguste Erhard], 3: Savez-vous que l'on vous adore? [Auguste Erhard], 4: Gazhel [Théophile Gautier], 5: Aube d'avril [A. Lambert], 6: Chant du conscript [Louis Tiercelin]). Paris: Au Ménestrel, Henri Heugel (H.5871–5882) (1884)

Piano music

- Bouton d'or. Polka. Paris: Mme. Cendrier (Mme. C. 500) (1847)
- Rêverie op. 2. Paris: Mme. Cendrier (Mme. C. 527) (1848)
- Six Études de salon. Paris: Alexandre Grus (A.G. 972) (1848)
- La Rosée. Impromptu de salon op. 3. Paris: Alexandre Grus (A.G. 973) (1848)
- Deux pensées caractéristiques op. 4: 1: Aveux du soir. Melodie (M.C. 527); 2: Les caquets. Étude (M.C. 554). Paris: Mme. Cendrier (1850)
- Metiva. Mazurka op. 5. Paris: Choudens (1850–1)
- Fantaisie brillante sur une mélodie (La truite) de Fr. Schubert op. 6. Paris: Richault (11210. R.) (1852)
- Souvenir de Fontainebleau: La Roche qui pleure. Caprice-nocturne op. 7. Paris: J. Meissonnier fils (J.M. 3252) (1853)
- Grande valse brillante op. 8. Paris: Chabal (Ch. 849) (1850)
- Le Lac (de Niedermeyer). Transcrit et varié op. 9 (185?)
- Chant du départ. Fantaisie. Paris: Richault (mid-1850s)
- La Mare aux fées, Souvenir de Fontainebleau. Caprice op. 11. Paris: H. Lemoine (4112. HL) (1855)
- Rêverie d’automne. Nocturne op. 12. Paris: H. Lemoine (4190. HL) (1857)
- Rayons de printemps. Morceau de salon op. 13. Paris: H. Lemoine (4191. HL) (1857)
- Le Beïja-flor (Colibri). Caprice-étude op. 14 Paris: Choudens (A.C. 344) (1857)
- Dis-le moi!, de Schubert. Paris: Richault (c1857)
- Fantaisie sur l’opéra Falstaff d’Adolphe Adam op. 16. Paris: Richault (13200. R.) (1857)
- Souvenir du bal. Mazourka op. 17. Paris: H. Lemoine (5694. HL) (1860)
- Naples. Tarantelle op. 18. Paris: H. Lemoine (6013. HL) (1862)
- Au Bord de la mer. Méditation op. 19. Paris: Gambogi frères (G.G. 1261) (1860)
- Les Oiseaux de Trianon. Idylle op. 20. Paris: Gambogi frères (G.G. 1163) (1859)
- Les Bluets. Morceau de salon op. 21. Paris: E. Gérard & Cie. (C.M. 9425) (1861)
- La Bruyère. Caprice suédois op. 22. Paris: G. Brandus & S. Dufour (B. et D. 10470) (1862)
- Plainte de l’exilé. Cantabile op. 23. Paris: Schonenberger (S. 2702) (1862)
- L'Enrôlement. Marche op. 24. Paris: Gambogi frères (G.G. 1492) (1862)
- Fusées volantes op. 25. Paris: Gambogi frères (G.G. 1493) (1862)
- Les Soirées enfantines. Transcriptions faciles. Paris: Gambogi frères (1863–64). Numbers 2, 3, 4, 7, 10, 11 (1863): G.G. 1518–1523 [in this order]. Numbers 1, 5, 6, 8, 9, 12 (1864): G.G. 1668, 1671, 1669, 1672, 1670, 1673
- Valse des nymphes op. 27. Paris: Colombier (C. 2866) (1864)
- Une Matinée rose. Idylle op. 28. Paris: E. & A. Girod (E. et A.G. 4794) (1864)
- Cavatine de la favorite (Ange si pur) op. 29. Paris: Léon Grus (L.G. 2812) (1866)
- Marcha da exposicão portuensa. Marche de l’Exposition de Porto [op. 30?]. Paris: F. Mackar et Gresse (F.M. et G. 13) (1865). Republished as Souvenir de Lisbonne (1877).
- Maria pia. Valsa para piano [op. 31?]. Paris: F. Mackar et Gresse (F.M. et G. – H.B.) (1866)
- Les Soirées enfantines. Transcriptions faciles. Deuxième série. Paris: Gambogi frères (G.G. 1885–1890) (1866)
- Le Menuet de la reine op. 32. Paris: E. & A. Girod (E. et A.G. 5152) (1867)
- Les Castagnettes. Caprice espagnol op. 33. Paris: E. & A. Girod (E. et A.G. 5153) (1868)
- Les Soirées intimes. Transcriptions faciles. Paris: Ch. Gambogi et Cie. (G.G. 2037–42) (1868)
- La Noce de village. Caprice villageois pour le piano sur le chœr de Laurent de Rillé op. 34. Paris: Ch. Gambogi et Cie. (G.G. 2046) (1868)
- La Retraite. Fantaisie militaire sur le chœur de Laurent de Rillé op. 35. Paris: Léon Grus (L.G. 3004) (1868)
- La Permission de dix heures. Chanson Louis xv. op. 36. Paris: E. Cellerin (E.C.N. (1)) (1868)
- Pavane dansée à la cour du roi Henri iii op. 37. Paris: G. Flaxland (G.F. 1175) (1869)
- La Vague et la perle. Traduction Musicale op. 38. Paris: E. Cellerin (E.C.N. 40) (1869)
- Bertha. Valse de salon. Paris: Félix Mackar (F.M. 263) (1870). Reprinted 1877.
- Nouvelles mélodies de François Schubert. Paris: Schonenberger (S.2973) (1870)
- Mac-Mahon Marche op. 41. Paris: Choudens (c1871)
- Berceuse op. 42. Paris: E. Heu (E.H. 1872) (1871)
- Arlequin et Colombine. Passacaille (Air de danse ancien) op. 43. Paris: E. Heu (E.H. 1874) (1871)
- Chemin faisant. Souvenir op. 44. Paris: E. Heu (E.H. 1873) (1871)
- Romance de Joconde de l'opéra de J. Nicolo op. 45. Paris: A. O'Kelly (A.O.K. 83) (1872)
- Deux Romances de Beethoven: 1. en sol op. 46 No. 1; 2. romance en fa op. 46 No. 2. Paris: A. O'Kelly (A.O.K. 84 and 86) (1872)
- Marivaudage. Souvenir du 18ème siècle op. 47. Paris: A. O'Kelly (A.O.K. 100) (1872)
- 1ère Mazurka op. 48. Paris: E. et A. Girod (E. et A.G. 5523) (1874)
- Valse de printemps op. 49. Paris: E. et A. Girod (E. et A.G. 5522) (1874)
- Vingt-cinq études récréatives op. 50. Paris: F. Schoen (F.225.S.) (1875)
- Au bal. Souvenir op. 51. Paris: A. O'Kelly (A.O.K. 263) (1875)
- En 1795. Interméde-gavotte op. 52. Paris: A. O'Kelly (A.O.K. 316) (1876)
- Après la tempête. Élégie dramatique op. 53. Paris & Versailles: A. O'Kelly & Lissarague (A.L. 21) (1876)
- Rêves du soir. Nocturne op. 54. Paris: Choudens père et fils (A.C. 2728) (1877)
- Le Timbre d’argent. Opéra fantastique de C. Saint-Saëns. Fantaisie, transcription pour piano op. 55. Paris: Choudens père et fils (A.C. 3676) (1877)
- Carmen. Opéra-comique de G. Bizet. Fantaisie op. 56. Paris: Choudens père et fils (A.C. 3689) (1877)
- Martha. Fantaisie. Paris: Choudens père et fils (c1877)
- Capriccio (avec pédale tonale) op. 57. Paris: A. O'Kelly (A.O.K. 393) (1877)
- Air irlandais op. 58. Paris: A. O'Kelly (A.O.K. 399) (1877)
- Gavotte op. 59. Paris: A. O'Kelly (A.O.K. 400) (1877)
- Le Déserteur. Opéra de Monsigny. Fantaisie Transcription à 2 Mains op. 60. Paris: A. O'Kelly (M.D. 9) (1877)
- Le Déserteur. Opéra de Monsigny. Transcription sur d'autres Motifs à 4 Mains op. 61. Paris: A. O'Kelly (M.D. 9) (1877)
- Ballet des muses. Caprice op. 62. Paris: Félix Mackar (F.M. 663) (1878)
- Les Fils d'automne. Harmonie Poétique op. 63. Paris: Félix Mackar (F.M. 664) (1878)
- Esquisses mythologiques op. 64. Paris: A. O'Kelly & Naus (A.O.K. 879) (1881)
- À l'aventure. Chanson op. 65. Paris: Léon Grus (L.G. 3858) (1884)
- Vingt-cinq études de mécanisme & de style op. 66. Paris: A. O'Kelly (A.O.K. 1145) (1884)

Chamber music

- Grand duo sur les Noces de Jeannette, Opéra de Victor Massé op. 10 (for vn, pf; written together with Jean-Pierre Maurin), Paris: Mme. Cendrier (Mme. C. 635) (1854)
- Trio pour piano, violon et violoncello op. 15. Paris: Richault (148 R.) (1858)
- Ouverture de Zampa de F. Hérold. Paris: E. Gérard et Cie. (C.M. 10691) (1868)
- Ouverture de Don Juan de Mozart. Paris: E. Gérard et Cie. (C.M. 10719) (1868)
- Ouverture du Freyschutz de C. M. Weber. Paris: E. Gérard et Cie. (C.M. 10808) (1868)
- Ouverture de Le jeune Henri de Méhul. Paris: E. Gérard et Cie. (C.M. 10809) (1868)
- Ouverture d’Oberon, de C.M. de Weber. Paris: E. Gérard et Cie. (C.M. 10846) (1869)
- Ouverture de Sémiramide de G. Rossini. Paris: E. Gérard et Cie. (C.M. 10863) (1869)
- Mac-Mahon Marche. For military band (c1871-3); version of piano piece op. 41. Unpublished.
- Menuet, pour flûte, hautbois, cor, alto, violoncelle et contrebasse (performed in March 1880 – a version of his Menuet de la Reine op. 32 of 1868). Unpublished.

== Bibliography ==
- Axel Klein: O'Kelly. An Irish Musical Family in Nineteenth-Century France (Norderstedt: BoD, 2014), ISBN 978-3-7357-2310-9.
- –– : "Joseph O'Kelly and the 'Slings and Arrows of Fortune'", in: Études irlandaises 39.1 (2014), pp. 23–39.
