= Heugel (music publisher) =

French music publisher

- Founded: 1839
- Founder: Jacques-Léopold Heugel; Jean-Antoine Meissonnier
- Defunct: 12 December 2014
- Successor: Éditions Alphonse Leduc (2014)
- Country of origin: France
- Headquarters location: Paris
- Key people: Henri Heugel; Jacques Heugel; François Heugel
- Publication types: sheet music

Heugel was a French music publishing company, founded in 1839, that became one of the most prolific and ubiquitous businesses of its kind in the nineteenth and early twentieth century. It was taken over in 1980 by Alphonse Leduc and dissolved in 2014.

== Founding years ==
The French music publishing house of Heugel was founded on 1 January 1839 in Paris by Jacques-Léopold Heugel (1 March 1815 – 12 November 1883) and Jean-Antoine Meissonnier (1783–1857). Heugel was born in La Rochelle and was active as a music teacher in Nantes before he came to Paris. The company branded initially as "A. Meissonnier et J. L. Heugel". Until 1974, the seat of the company was at 2bis, rue Vivienne. After four years, Meissonnier sold his share to Heugel to concentrate on his own business, which was brought to success by his son, Jean-Racine Meissonnier. From then on, the company added "Au Ménestrel" to its name, alluding to the weekly music journal Le Ménestrel, which was founded in 1833 by Joseph Hippolyte L'Henry at the same address and that had been taken over by Heugel and Meissonnier. Le Ménestrel provided a convenient publicising forum for the music publishing business, also including, for a time, music supplements for the journal's subscribers. It was published by Heugel and his successors until 1940, with only a short interruption during World War I.

After Meissonnier's departure, Heugel ran the company on his own for eight years, joined in July 1850 by Aimé Iweins d'Hennin, and the company was rebranded "Heugel et Cie.". In its first years, the company focused on pedagogical works, romances, collections of dance music and the series "Les Clavecinistes" that was edited by Amédée de Méreaux. It also bought the rights to works originally published by other companies, such as Le Désert by Félicien David (originally with Léon Escudier). This was followed by new works, mainly operas, by composers such as Jacques Offenbach, Ambroise Thomas, and Léo Delibes, which proved very successful. In 1863, d'Hennin sold his share at three times the price he paid twelve years before. Heugel prudently continued the business, and also became a strong advocate for copyright issues as one of the first administrators of SACEM. For his services to French music, Heugel was made a Chevalier of the Légion d'honneur in August 1870.

== Era of Henri Heugel ==
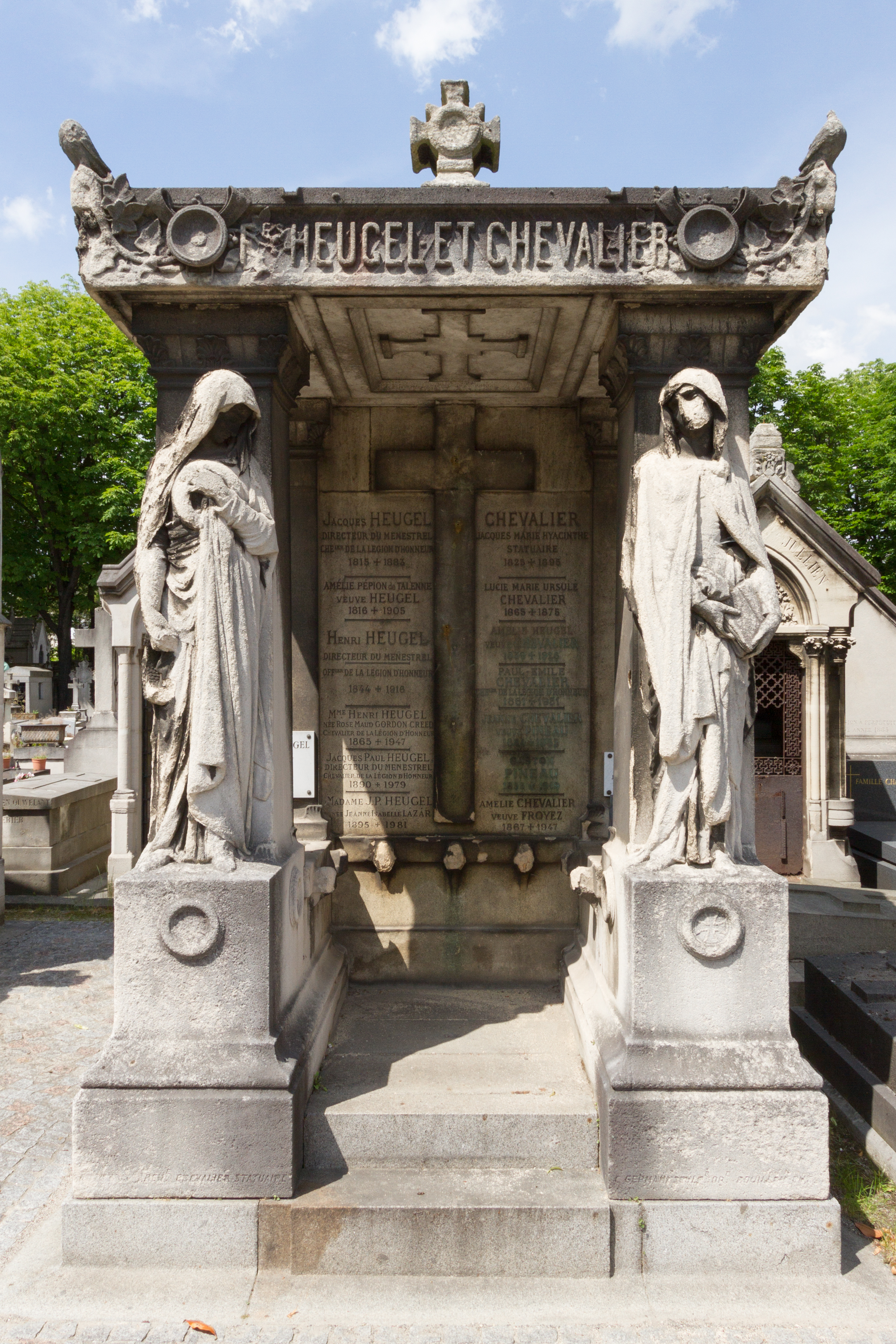
Family tomb of Heugel-Chevalier on the Passy Cemetery (Division 4), Paris

Jacques-Léopold's son Henri-Georges, known as Henri Heugel (3 May 1844 – 11 May 1916) entered the company around 1869, but it was not until 1876 that the company was eventually renamed to "Heugel et fils", with Henri acquiring one third of the shares. Henri expanded the house considerably by acquiring collections to further enrich the catalogue. He was able to publish works by Gustave Charpentier, Gioachino Rossini and Giuseppe Verdi, as well as some of the great French composers of his time including Gabriel Fauré, Édouard Lalo, and Jules Massenet. He became known as a specialised publisher of opera scores, besides continuing to publish a large number of works for piano and songs for which there was a great demand. His success enabled him to acquire the catalogues of Georges Hartmann and Tellier (in 1891) and parts of the catalogues of Léon Escudier (1882), E. Gérard (1882–90), Louis Gregh (1884), Egrot (1884), Bruneau et Cie. (1891), and Pérégally & Parvy (1904). In July 1892, Heugel's employee and nephew, Paul-Émile Chevalier (1861–1931) became a co-owner of the company, and it was renamed to "Heugel et Cie.". In 1912, they renewed their contract until 1924, but Heugel's death in 1916 cut this short. Chevalier continued until 1919, when Jacques-Paul Heugel took over.

== Jacques Heugel ==
Jacques-Paul Heugel, known as Jacques Heugel (25 January 1890 – 21 October 1979) successfully continued in the family's footsteps, transforming it to a publicly listed company in March 1944. He attracted some of the most gifted French composers of the beginning of the twentieth century, including Georges Auric, Reynaldo Hahn, Jacques Ibert, André Jolivet, Darius Milhaud, Francis Poulenc, and Florent Schmitt. In 1948, Jacques withdrew from the business, leaving it to his two sons, François and Philippe.

== Last years ==
François Heugel (22 August 1922 – 2010) as commercial director and Philippe Heugel (8 July 1924 – 13 July 1991) as artistic director continued the business, taking on works by Gilbert Amy, Pierre Boulez, Henri Dutilleux, Betsy Jolas, and others. In 1967, the company started a new series of early music edited by François Lesure and Kenneth Gilbert. In 1980, the company was taken over by Éditions Alphonse Leduc. They sold their considerable archives at a public auction in 2011. On 12 December 2014, the company, which was heavily in deficit, was dissolved.

== Bibliography ==
- Daniele Pistone and François Heugel: Heugel et ses musiciens: lettres à un éditeur parisien (Paris, 1984).
