= Prix Rossini =

French music award

The Prix Rossini for composition was a prize for young librettist and composers which was granted by the French Académie des Beaux-Arts. The prize was funded by a provision in composer Gioachino Rossini's will which took effect in 1878 after the death of his widow. First and second prize winners received funding for their winning work to be performed in a prestigious ceremony which was managed by the Société des Concerts of the Institut de France, also associated with the Paris Conservatoire. The first award of the prize in 1881 was to librettist Paul Collin and composer Marie, Countess of Grandval for the oratorio La fille de Jaïre.

It was first planned to present the works in a concert two weeks post-season every two years, but because of the expense and difficulty of producing the large-scale events, it was decided to award the prize on three year cycle instead. In 1893 the presentation was moved to two weeks pre-season. The Société des Concerts presented six productions between 1885 and 1911, all for composers who went on to establish successful careers. In 2004 the prize was still awarded to musicians.

== Winners ==
Winners of the Prix Rossini include:

- Clémence de Grandval (1828–1907)
- Paul Collin (1843–1915)
- Will Chaumuet (1842–1903)
- Auguste Chapuis (1858–1933)
- Henri Hirschmann (1872–1961)
- Marcel Rousseau (1882–1955)
- Marc Delmas (1885–1931)
- Louis Fourestier (1892–1976)
- Gaston Litaize (1909–1991)
- Marcel Tournier (1879–1951)
- Herman Bemberg (1859–1931)
- Lucien-Léon Guillaume Lambert (1858–1945)
