= Paul Collin =

French poet and writer

Paul Collin (12 July 1843 – 5 February 1915) was a French poet, writer, translator and librettist.

== Life and career ==
Collin was born in Conches-en-Ouche. In the 18th and early 19th centuries, his family produced administrative officers in the military, mail and law service as well as physicians. He started a professional career as a lawyer before marrying one of the daughters of the French chemist Theodore Gobley.

Poetry proved to be Collin's real vocation, and he went on to write libretti and song lyrics for a number of operas and cantatas, collaborating with contemporary composers of the second half of the 19th century including Tchaikovsky, who used several of his shorter poetry works for songs. Collin published a collection of his works in 1886. The first award of the Prix Rossini in 1881 was awarded to Paul Collin and the composer Marie, Countess of Grandval for the oratorio La Fille de Jaïre. Collin also wrote as a music critic for the journal Le Ménestrel.

== Works ==
Selected works include:

- Agar, "poème lyrique" for soloists, mixed chorus and orchestra, music by Georges Pfeiffer (1875)
- Narcisse: Idylle antique pour solo et choeur, opera, music by Jules Massenet (1878)
- Ulysse a l'ile des Sirenes, cantata, music by Jules Massenet (1879)
- La Ronde des songes: scène fantastique, music by Clémence de Grandval (1880)
- Rébecca, cantata, music by César Franck (1880–81)
- La Fille de Jaïre, oratorio, music by Clémence de Grandval (1881)
- Eternité, song, music by Clémence de Grandval (1883)
- Déception, No. 2 of the Six French Songs, Op. 65, music by Pyotr Ilyich Tchaikovsky (1888)
- Sérénade ("J'aime dans le rayon"), No. 3 of the Six French Songs, Op. 65, music by Tchaikovsky (1888)
- Qu'importe que l'hiver, No. 4 of the Six French Songs, Op. 65, music by Tchaikovsky (1888)
- Rondel, No. 6 of the Six French Songs, Op. 65, music by Tchaikovsky (1888)
- Attala, music by Juliette Folville (1890)
- Zaire, opera, music by Charles Lefebvre (1890)
- La Naissance de Vénus, music by Gabriel Fauré (1900)
- Amica, opera, music by Pietro Mascagni (1905)

== Published books ==
- Musique de chambre, poems, ed. Hachette
- Glas et carillons, poems, ed. Hachette
- Du grave au doux, poems, ed. Hachette, 1878
- Les Heures Paisibles, poems, ed. Hachette
- Judith, dramatic opera, music by Charles Lefebvre, ed. Mackar
- Poèmes Musicaux, ed. Tresse et Stock, 1886
- Poèmes sacrés et profanes
