= Clémence de Grandval =

French composer (1828–1907)

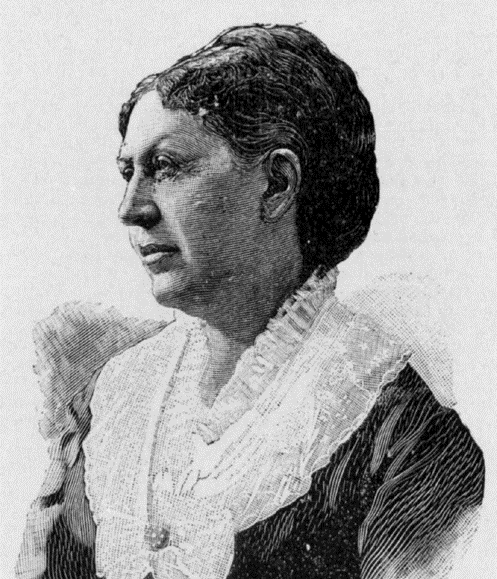
Clémence de Grandval

Clémence de Grandval (21 January 1828 – 15 January 1907), born as Marie Félicie Clémence de Reiset and also known as Vicomtesse de Grandval and Marie Grandval, was a French composer of the Romantic era. She was a person and composer of stature during her life, although less remembered subsequently. Many of her works were published under pseudonyms.

== Biography ==
Marie Félicie Clémence de Reiset was the youngest of four children, born in 1828 into a well-to-do family in the Chateau de la Cour du Bois at Saint-Rémy-des-Monts. Her father was an Officier de la Légion d'honneur and a talented pianist, while her mother wrote and published stories. Her parents received many composers and artists, including Jean-Baptiste-Philémon de Cuvillon, Auguste-Joseph Franchomme, Louis-Nicolas Cary and Paul Scudo.

At a very young age, she received composition lessons from composer and family friend Friedrich Flotow, and later studied with Frédéric Chopin. Because her family was wealthy, she was able to work as a composer without financial concerns. She married the Vicomte de Grandval and they had two daughters, Isabelle and Thérèse. She subsequently studied for two years with Camille Saint-Saëns (he dedicated his Oratorio de Noel to her), and continued to work as a composer after her marriage. However, her social position led her to publish several of her works under pseudonyms. These included Caroline Blangy, Clémence Valgrand, Maria Felicita de Reiset, and Maria Reiset de Tesier.

Grandval was a vegetarian and a spiritualist, and for this was deemed eccentric. She performed her own compositions extensively; Cecile Chaminade also gave a performance consisting exclusively of Grandval's music.

Grandval was the recipient of the inaugural Prix Rossini, winning in 1881 with her librettist Paul Collin. Her earliest works were sacred and performed in churches, but she went on to write a number of operas and various popular songs and instrumental works, including many pieces for oboe. Unfortunately, the orchestral scores of some of her pieces have been lost.

During the 1870s, Grandval played a major role in the Société Nationale de Musique, and was the most played composer in this society. She also gave much money to the organisation. During the second part of the 19th century, she was a very popular composer who was admired by many critics. She died in Paris in 1907.

== Notable compositions ==
Unlike many of her contemporaries, Grandval wrote many pieces for oboe, and wrote several operas.

=== Opera ===
- Le sou de Lise (1860)
- Les fiancés de Rosa (1863)
- La comtesse Eva (1864
- La pénitente (1868)
- Piccolino (1869)
- Mazeppa (1892)

=== Choral ===
- Mass (1867)
- Stabat mater (1870), cantata
- Sainte-Agnès (1876), oratorio
- La fille de Jaïre (1881), oratorio

=== Concertante ===
- Oboe concerto in D minor, Op. 7

=== Chamber ===
- 2 pieces for clarinet and piano (1885)
- 4 pieces for cor anglais and piano
- Deux Pieces, ob, vc, pf, 1884; published by June Emerson: WP references: https://www.juneemersonwindmusic.com/DEUX-PIECES-Romance-Gavotte.html

=== Songs ===
- "Noël!" (1901)

== Awards ==
- 1880: Concour Rossini, for her oratorio La fille de Jaïre.
- 1890: Cartier Prize, Conservatoire de Paris, for her chamber music.
