= Antoine François Marmontel =

French pianist, composer, teacher and musicographer (1816–1898)

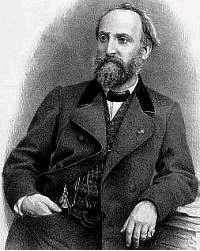
- Born: Antoine François Marmontel; 18 July 1816
- Died: 16 January 1898 (aged 81)

Antoine François Marmontel (French pronunciation: [ɑ̃twan fʁɑ̃swa maʁmɔ̃tɛl]; 18 July 1816 – 16 January 1898) was a French pianist, composer, teacher and musicographer. He is mainly known today as an influential teacher at the Paris Conservatory, where he taught many musicians who became leading voices of French music in the late 19th and early 20th century.

== Life and career ==
Marmontel was born in Clermont-Ferrand. He entered the Paris Conservatory in 1827. His teachers were Pierre Zimmerman in pianoforte, Victor Dourlen in harmony, Jacques Fromental Halévy in fugue and Jean-François Le Sueur in composition. He achieved a First Prize for his piano playing (1832). In 1837, he became professor of singing at the Conservatory. In 1846, Marmontel married Françoise Mélanie Pelletier, and in 1848 Marmontel succeeded Zimmerman as professor of piano, beating his former teacher Charles-Valentin Alkan, and as a consequence derailing the latter's career. His memoir of Alkan in his book Les Pianistes célèbres is nonetheless one of the most valuable sources for Alkan's biography.

Marmontel achieved renown as an effective and imaginative teacher. He had many pupils including Isaac Albéniz, Georges Bizet, Claude Debussy, Louis Diémer, Théodore Dubois, Dominique Ducharme, Gustave Gagnon, Ernest Guiraud, Vincent d'Indy, Albert Lavignac, Marguerite Long, Edward MacDowell, Zulema Garcia Olsen, Émile Paladilhe, Gabriel Pierné, Francis Planté, Maria Luisa Ponsa, Paul Rougnon, Paul Wachs, Józef Wieniawski, André Wormser, and Antoine Simon. See: List of music students by teacher: K to M#Antoine François Marmontel.

Marmontel's career is marked by a great number of educational works (more than 200 opus numbers) as well as nocturnes, romances and many other pieces. His musicographical works number among the best sources for the history of piano and pianists, particularly for the 19th century.

Marmontel died in Paris aged 81. His son Antonin Marmontel (1850–1907) was also a piano teacher at the Conservatoire. He wrote many salon pieces.

== Selected works ==
=== Educational works ===
- Grammaire populaire de musique ou théorie raisonnée des principes (1840)
- L'Art de déchiffrer (Cent études faciles)
- École élémentaire de mécanisme et de style (1847)
- Étude de mécanisme
- Cinq études de salon
- 24 Études d'agilité et d'expression, Op. 45 (1857)
- École élémentaire et progressive de musique concertante. L'Art de déchiffrer à 2 mains, Op. 60, 2 volumes (1862)
- 24 Grandes études de style et de bravoure, Op. 85 (1866)
- L'Art de déchiffrer à quatre mains. L'Art de déchiffrer à 4 mains, Op. 111 (1872)
- 50 Études de salon, Op. 108 (1875)
- Enseignement progressif et rationnel du piano, Op. 157 (1887)

=== Books ===
- L'Art classique et moderne du piano, 2 volumes (1876)
- Les Pianistes célèbres (1878)
- Symphonistes et virtuoses (1881)
- Virtuoses contemporains (1882)
- Éléments d'esthétique musicale et considérations sur le beau dans les arts (1884)
- Histoire du piano et de ses origines (1885)

== Bibliography ==
- Patrick Bourgois: Antoine Marmontel (1816–1898). L'Homme et l'œuvre (PhD dissertation, Paris: Université Paris-Sorbonne, 1993).
