= Dimitri (Joncières) =

1876 grand opera in five acts by Victorin de Joncières

- Opera by Victorin Joncières
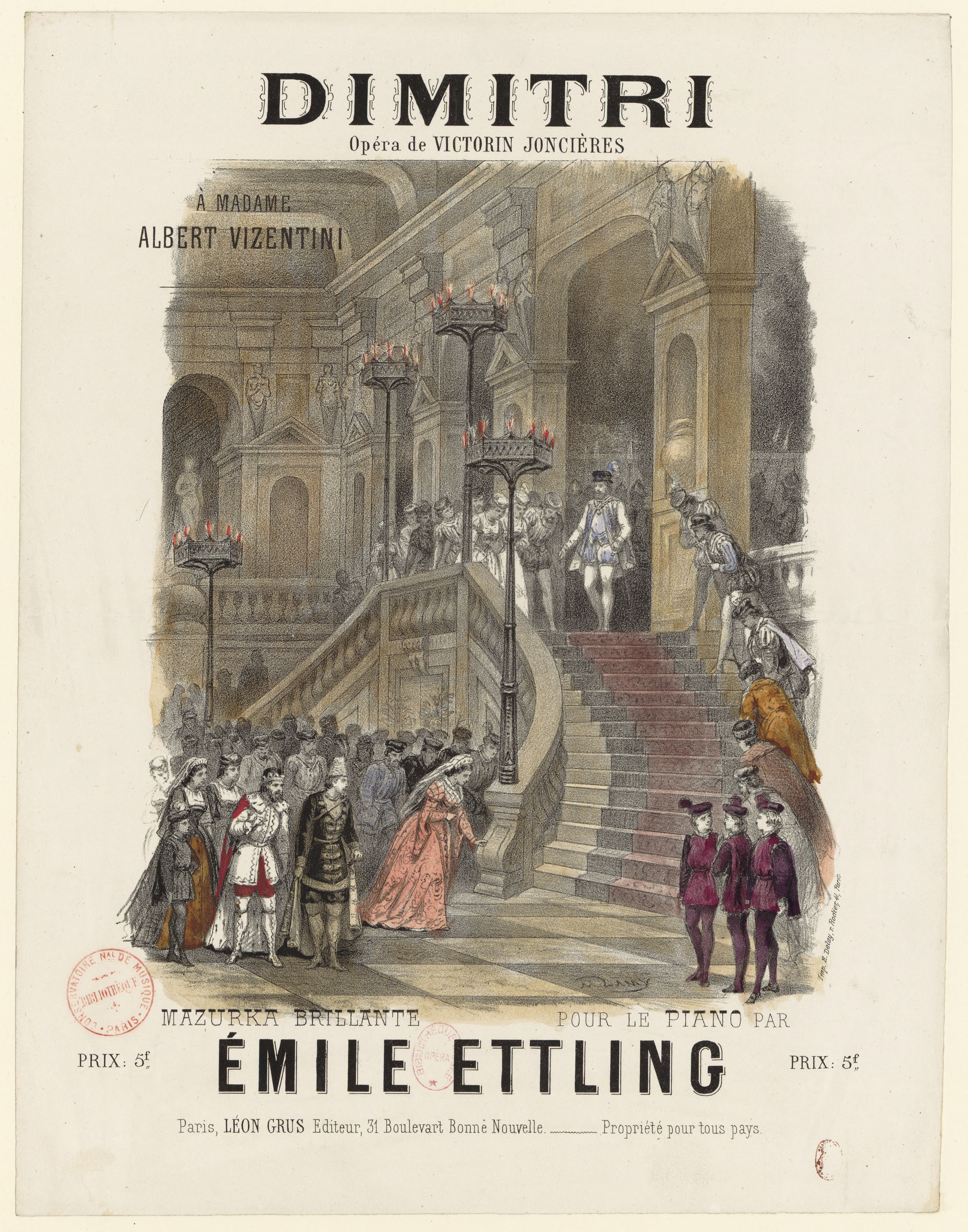
- Librettist: Henri de Bornier; Paul Armand Silvestre
- Language: French
- Based on: Demetrius by Friedrich Schiller
- Premiere: 5 May 1876; Théâtre National Lyrique, Paris

Dimitri is an 1876 French-language grand opera in five acts by Victorin de Joncières to a libretto by Henri de Bornier and Paul Armand Silvestre after Schiller's incomplete play Demetrius, a story based on the life of the Russian pretender False Dmitriy I (reigned 1605–1606). The opera was first performed in Paris at the Théâtre National Lyrique. Dvořák's 1881 opera Dimitrij was also based on Schiller's play.

== Synopsis ==
Act 1

Vasili (Dimitri) returns to a Polish monastery on the Don and greets the Abbot who raised him. He recounts how he was helped by Vanda, cousin of the Polish King, and fell in love with Marina. A gypsy troupe come and go, Marina has fled her father and an arranged marriage to the Count of Lusatia by disguising herself as one of them. She and Vasili recognise each other and reaffirm their love. The Count of Lusatia arrives and tells the Abbot that the boy Vasili is in fact Dimitri, youngest son of Ivan IV and Tsar of Russia. The Count comes upon Dimitri and Marina embracing.

Act 2

Vanda and Lusatia conspire to get Dimitri to leave Marina (who has fled to Russia to find Marpha, widow of Ivan IV) and marry Vanda, making her Tsarina. When the King of Poland arrives surrounded by his court, Vanda asks him to grant her hand to Dimitri. Dimitri, terrified, is told by Lusatia that he has no other option.

Act 3

Scene 1: Marina reveals to Marpha that her son Dimitri is alive. In an interview with the Patriarch of Moscow, Job, Marpha refuses to either reject or accept the young man as her son.

Scene 2: News arrives at Dimitri's camp outside Moscow that the citizenry have executed his rival, Boris Godunov. Lusatia recognises Vanda, who has followed Dimitri disguised as a soldier and realises that he does not love her.

Act 4

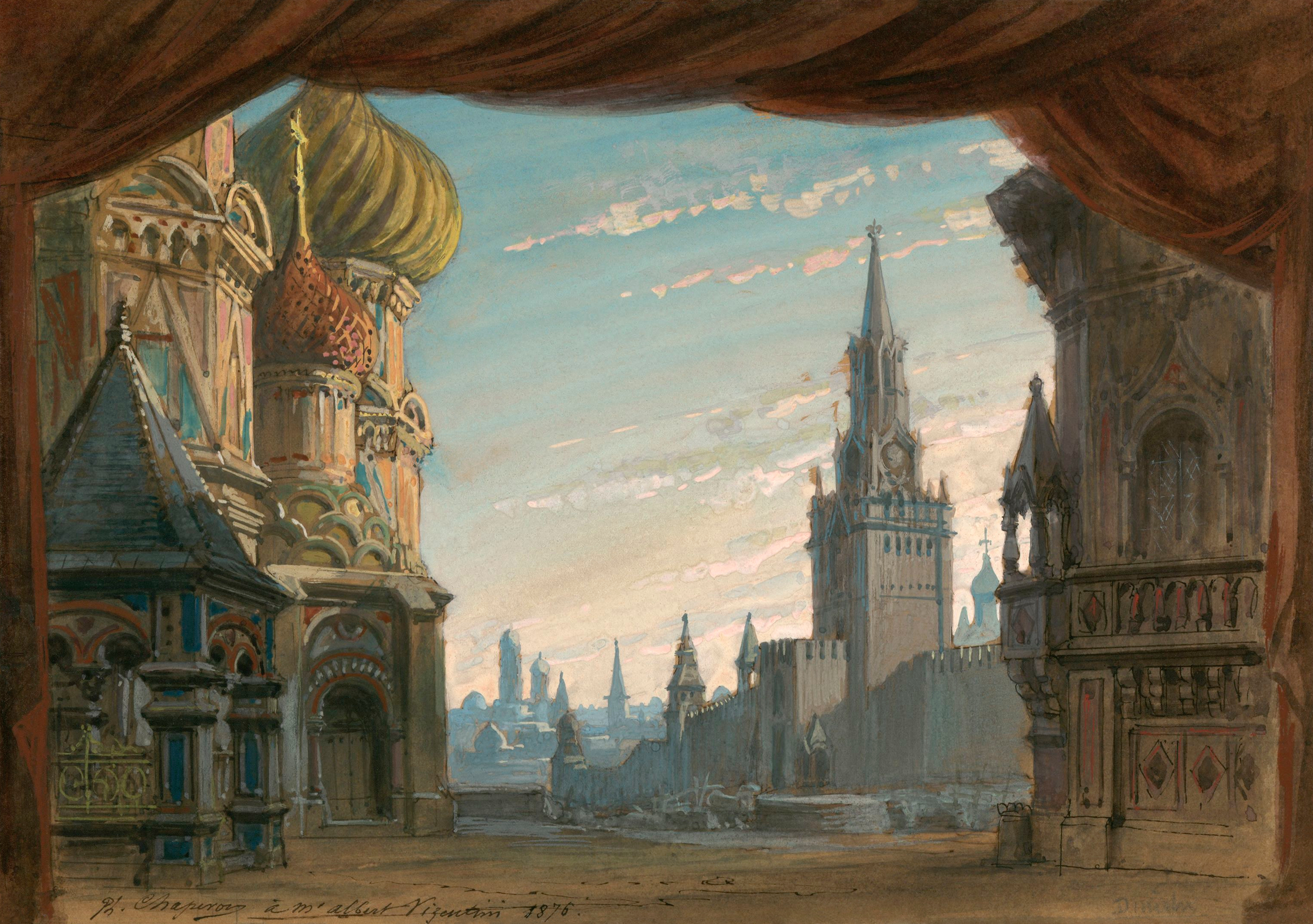
Set design by Philippe Chaperon for Act V in the première production

Scene 1: Lusatia tells Dimitri that he murdered the real Dimitri many years before. Dimitri stabs him and orders his body be carried out as Marpha arrives and recognises both Lusatia as her son's kidnapper and Dimitri as her son.

Scene 2: The Polish troops and the Moscovite Boyars acclaim Dimitri as their leader. Vanda swears revenge for her spurned affections.

Act 5

Vanda has nursed Lusatia back to health. Seeing Dimitri and Marina on a balcony the night before their coronation in Moscow, she plots with Lusatia. The Coronation procession is stopped by Patriarch Job, who demands that Marpha swear that Dimitri is her son. She hesitates—just as she is about to swear, she sees Lusatia taking out a pistol from a balcony above. Dimitri is mortally wounded and dies surrounded by Marina and Marpha, asking along with the Moscovites for God to reveal the truth.

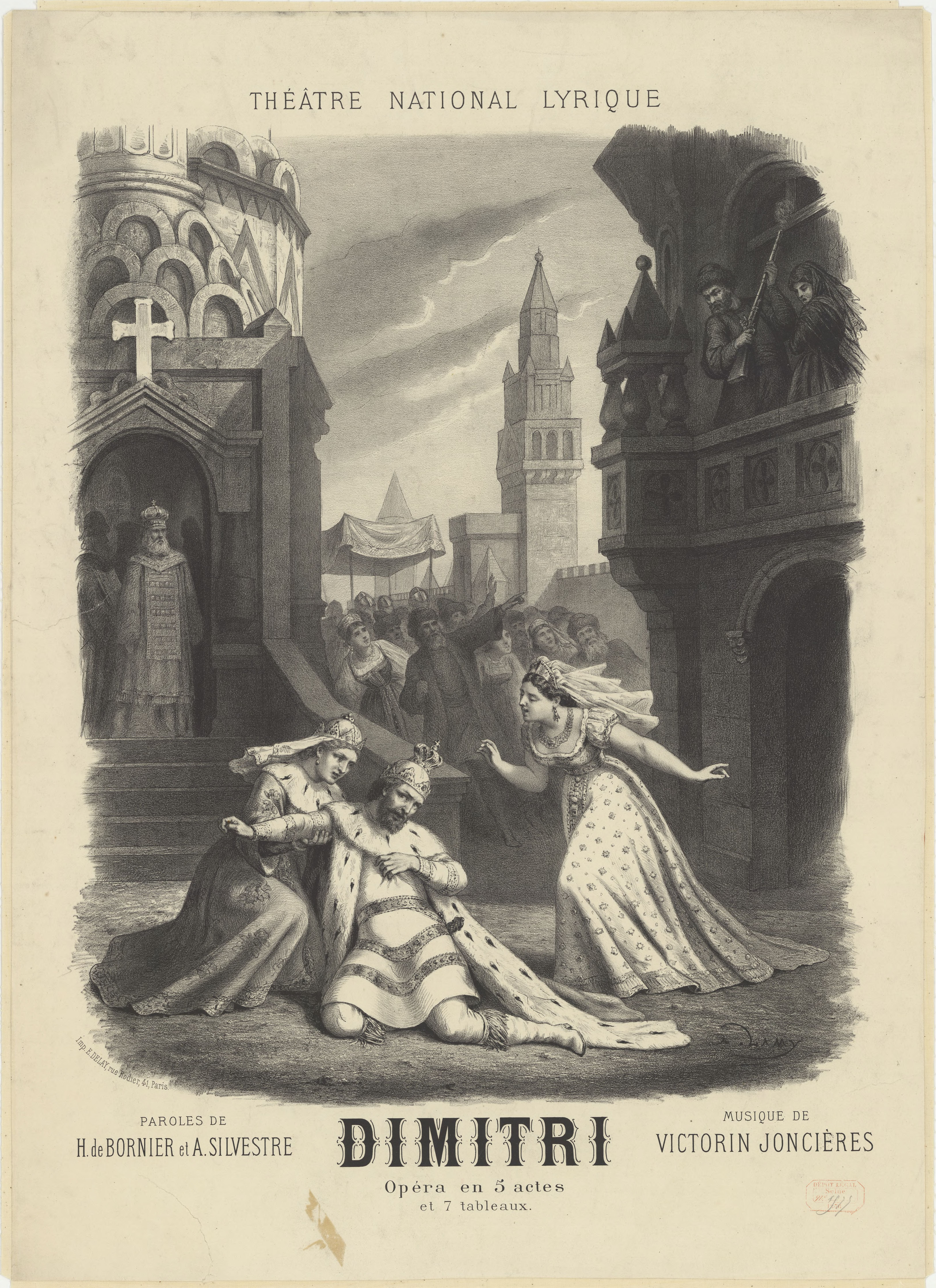
Dimitri's death, in a poster by Pierre-Auguste Lamy

== Recordings ==
- 2014: DDD, Gabrielle Philiponet, Nora Gubisch, Philippe Talbot, Andrew Foster-Williams, Flemish Radio Choir, Brussels Philharmonic, Hervé Niquet (conductor)
