= Étienne Gibert =

French tenor (1859–1929)

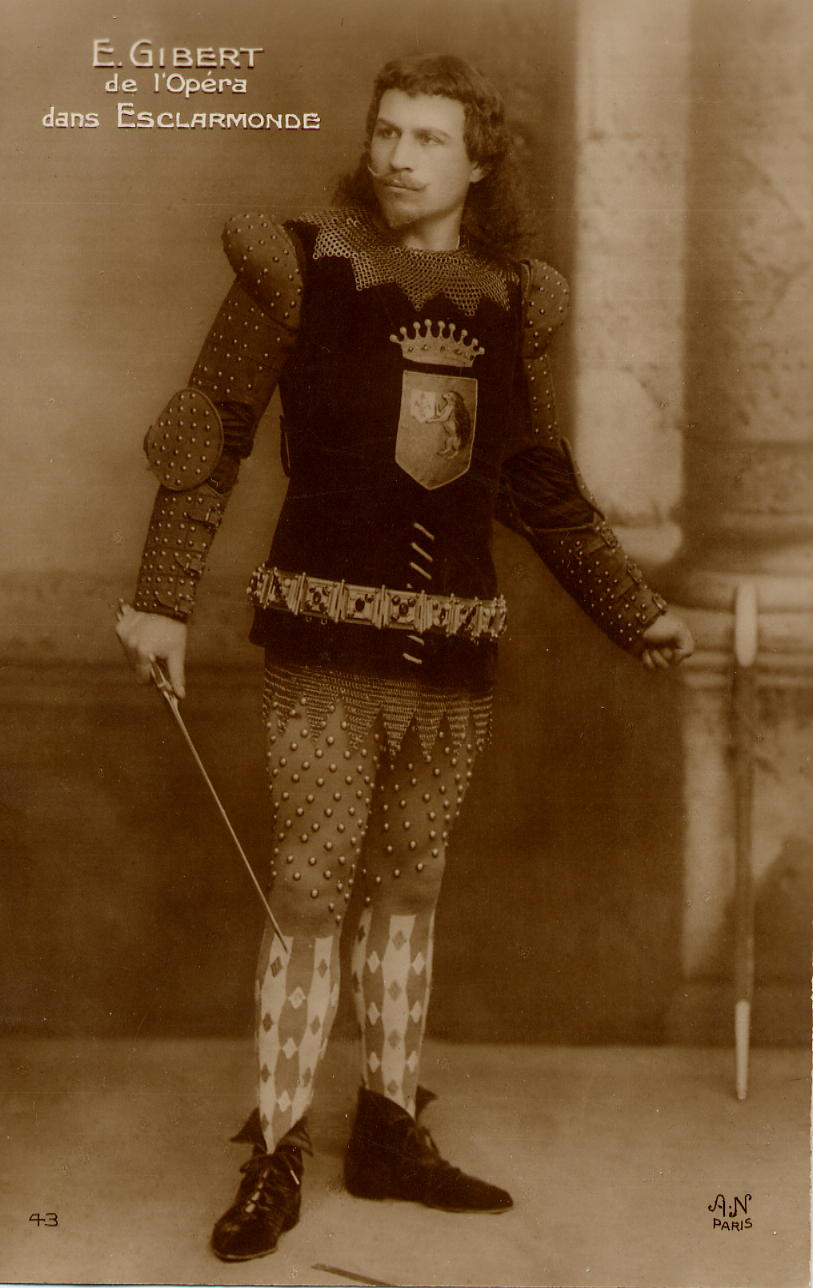
Étienne Gibert (1859-1929) as knight Roland in Esclarmonde (Jules Massenet) (1889) - Opéra comique, Paris - post card AN - Paris - liméro 43

Étienne Gibert (1859-1929) was a French opera tenor.

== Biography ==
Étienne Gibert was born on December 3 or 4, 1859, in a village called Jonquières, located between Beaucaire and Nîmes. His formal education, which was quite limited, was provided by the local friars at the village school. He became a peasant until one day, the local baker heard him sing while he was working in the fields. The baker introduced him to a singer at the theatre in Nîmes around 1882. After taking some music lessons, he was sent to Paris, where he was admitted to the Conservatory in October 1884. There, he studied singing with Eugène Crosti, opera with Louis-Henri Obin, and music theory with Joseph Heyberger. He sang at the same time in the choir of Saint-Roch, "sometimes skipping classes at the Conservatoire for a funeral" (for which he was paid). He won an honourable mention in singing in 1885, second prize in singing in 1886 and came very close to winning first prize in 1887, leaving the Conservatoire with "only" an honourable mention in opera and first prize in music theory.

He was immediately recruited by the Rouen Opera House. In his first year, he performed in the local premieres of Le Tribut de Zamora and Le Cid, chosen by Jules Massenet, who did not want any other Rodrigue. He then sang in l'Africaine, Roméo, Faust, le Trouvère, Lucie and les Huguenots, with resounding success, and word spread to Paris. Massenet made sure that the Opéra-Comique recruited him for the role of Knight Roland in his new opera, Esclarmonde (1889), alongside Sibyl Sanderson. It was performed a hundred times in a row. In 1890, Gibert premiered another role, as Dante, in Benjamin Godard's Dante et Béatrice (1890).

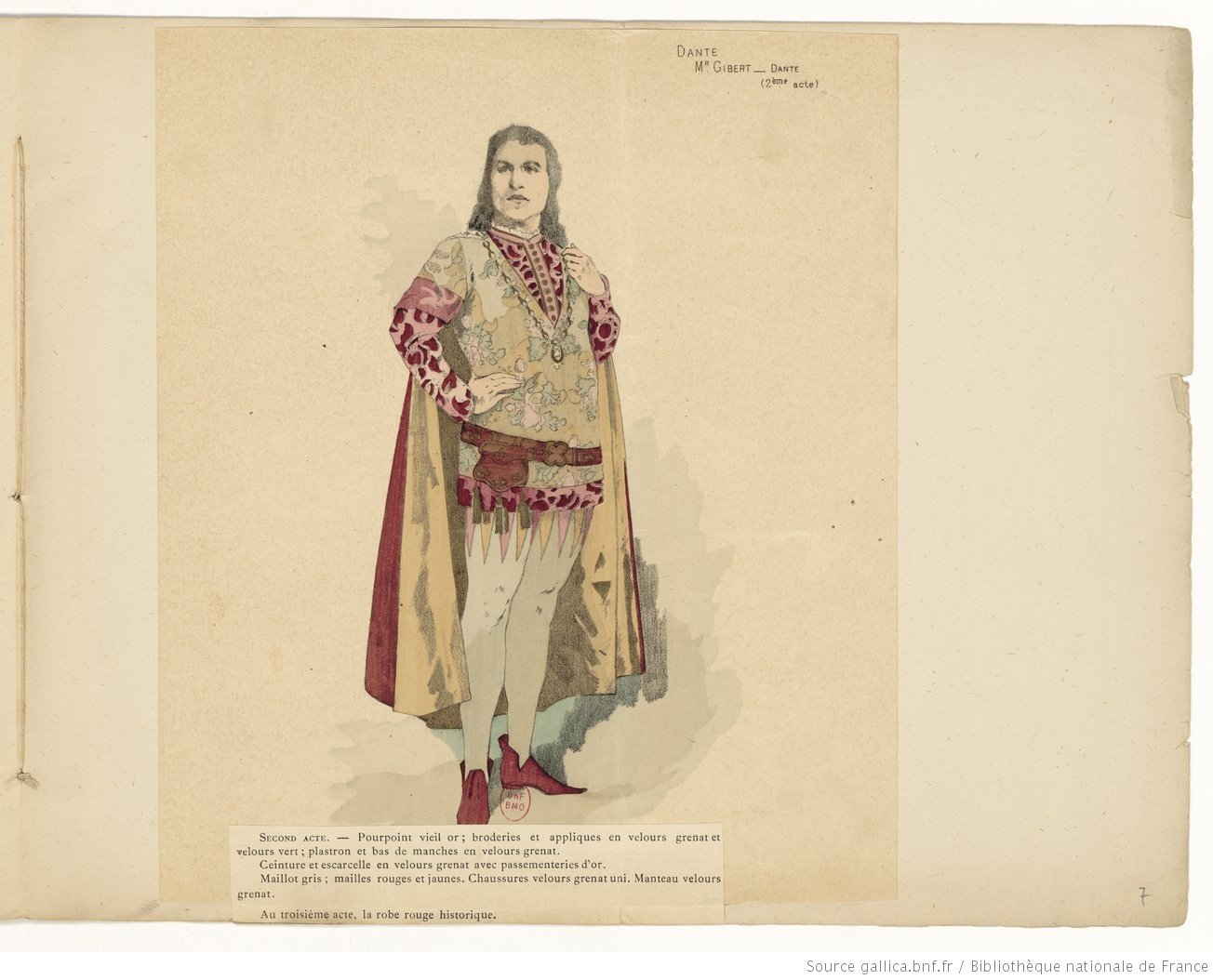
Étienne Gibert - Dante - Act 2 - print by Alphonse Mucha

New first performances followed, in Kassya (by Léo Delibes); Enguerrande, by Auguste Chapuis, first performed at the Opéra-Comique on 2 May 1892; in Cavalleria Rusticana, by Mascagni, he masterfully plays the role of Turrido alongside Emma Calvé (Santuzza) and Max Bouvet. He was then recruited by the Opéra de Nice (1899-1901 ?). In 1899 he sang as Tristan in Tristan et Yseult, the major artistic event of the year in Paris (organised by Countess Élisabeth Greffulhe, directed by Charles Lamoureux), with Félia Litvinne, Marie Brema, MM. Vallier et Sainprey). He was recruited by La Monnaie for one season, and then left to the USA and sang in Roméo et Juliette and Faust at the Metropolitan opera during the 1901–1902 season. He was then first enor in Bordeaux, again in Nice, and in 1907 at the Municipal Theatre of Algiers In November 1909, at the Trianon-Lyrique, he sang the role of Richard in a revival of Richard Cœur de Lion. In 1912 he and Jeanne Leclerc (also a former singer at the Opéra-Comique) opened a singing class "salle Dupeyron, 80, rue Taitbout" (Square d'Orléans). Gibert was living at the time at villa Jonquières (16, Rue de Verrières), in Antony. Étienne Gibert died at his home on 28 July 1929.

His voice has been compared to that of Villaret. Some critics said that "along with Van Dyck and Jean de Reszke, Étienne Gibert alone could sing the Wagnerian repertoire with any credit."
