= Enguerrande =

1892 opera by Auguste Chapuis

Enguerrande is a lyrical drama in four acts and five scenes with music by Auguste Chapuis and libretto by Victor Wilder based on the poem by Émile Bergerat. First performed at the Opéra-Comique (Paris) on 2 May 1892, conducted by Jules Danbé, with Henri Carré as choir director and costumes by Charles Bianchini

== Roles ==
Roles, voice types, premiere cast
Role	Voice type	Premiere cast, 2 May 1892 Conductor: Jules Danbé
Enguerrande	dramatic soprano	Miss Boucart
Gaëtan	tenor	Étienne Gibert
Noéma, a flower girl	soprano	Jane Horwitz (1866–1909)
A woodcutter	bass or baritone	René Fournets
Arias	tenor	Mr. Julien
Mélibée	baritone	Lucien Fugère
Orlitz	bass	C. Bernaert
The archbishop	lyric bass	(Hippolyte ?) Fierens
Chorus: Notables of Palermo, courtiers, courtesans, commoners, soldiers

Costumes for the 1892 production of Enguerrande, designed by Charles Bianchini

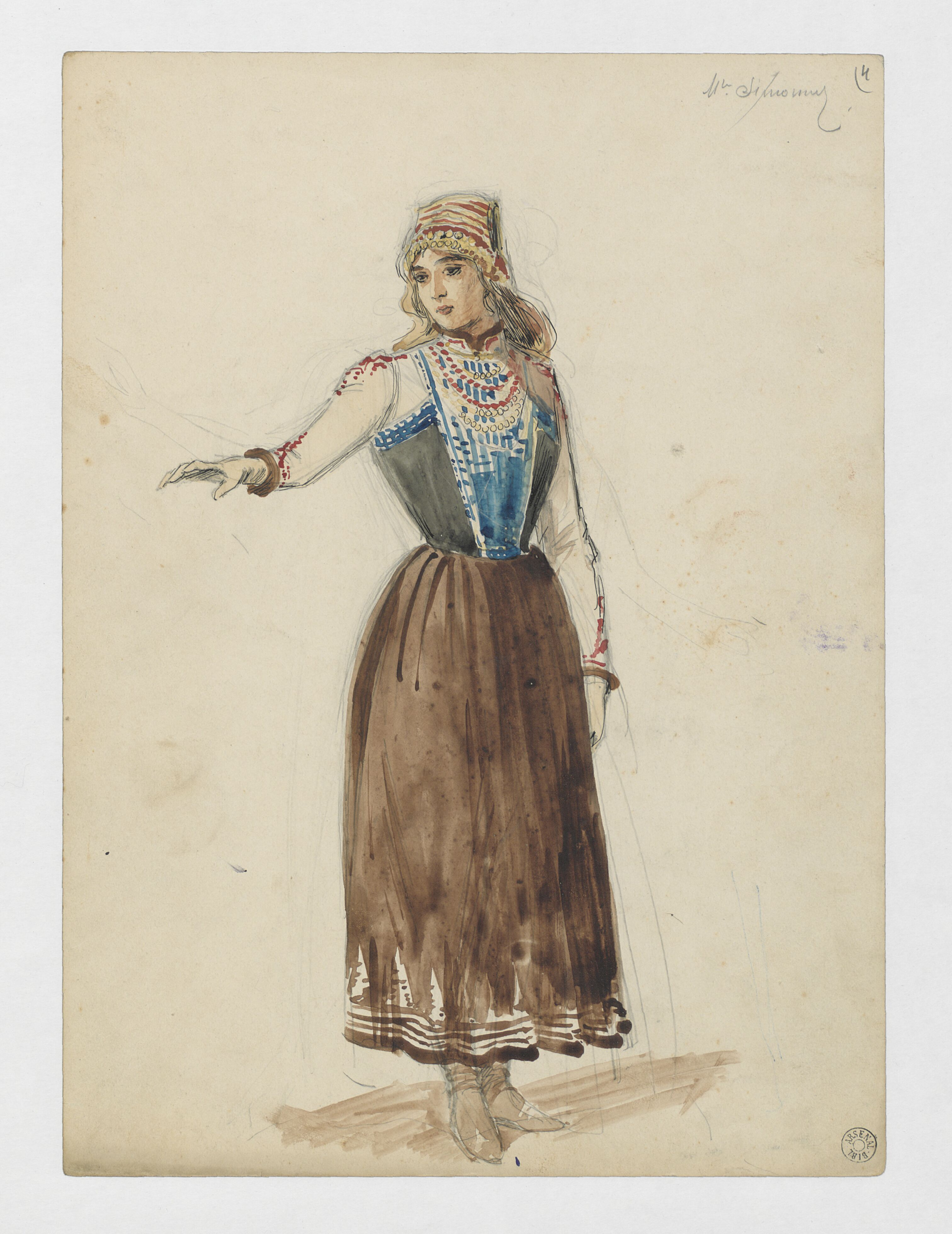

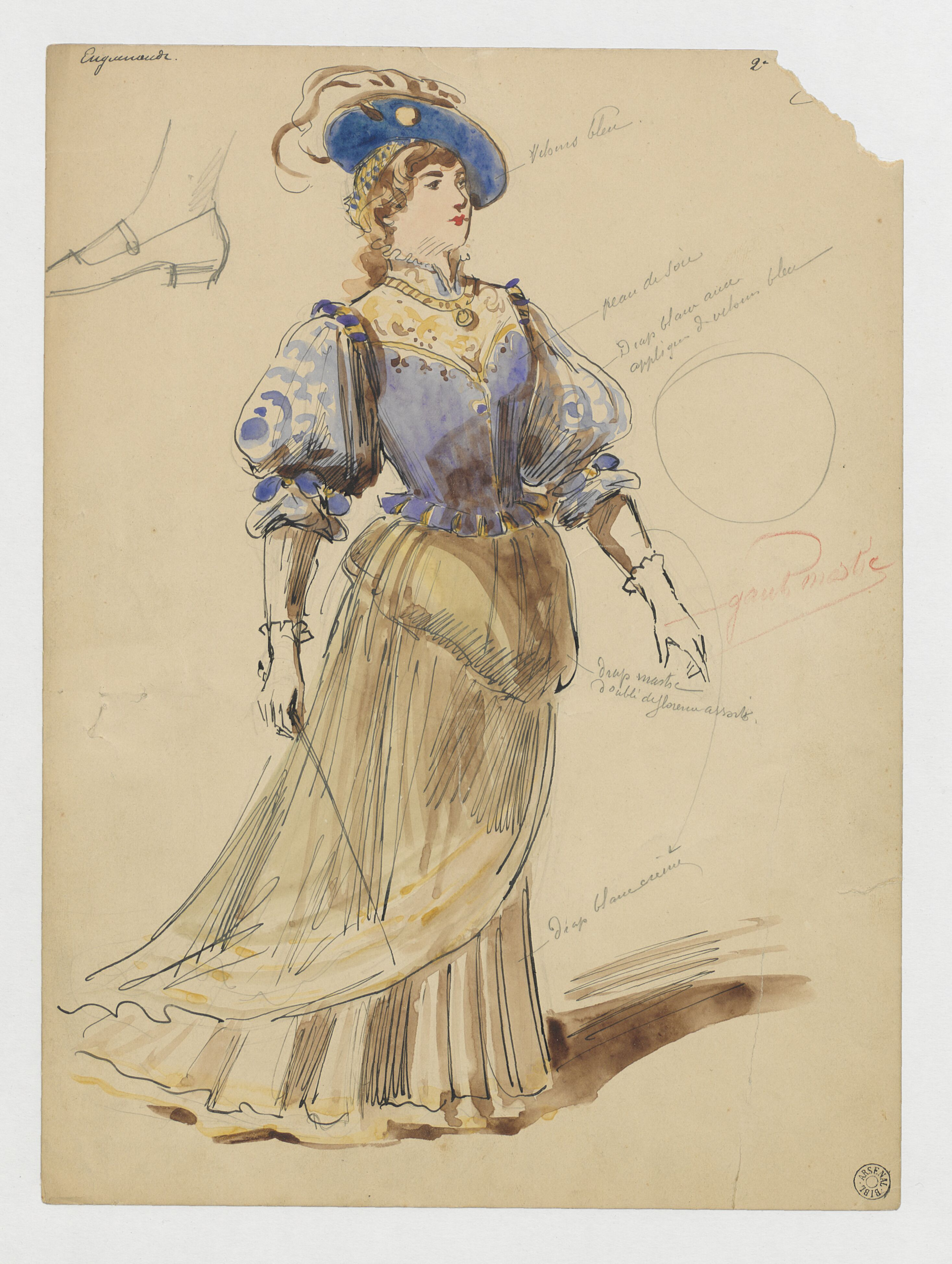

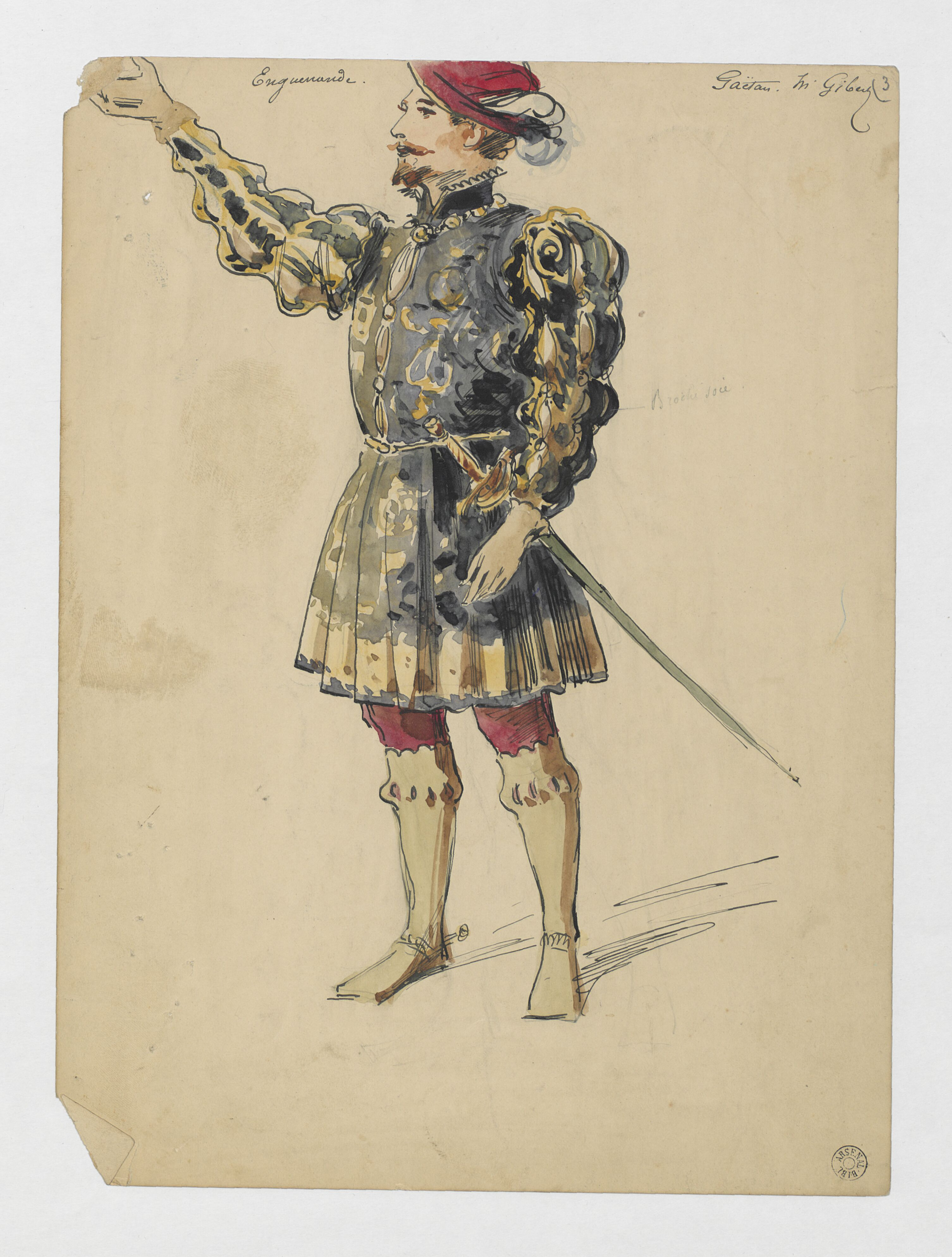

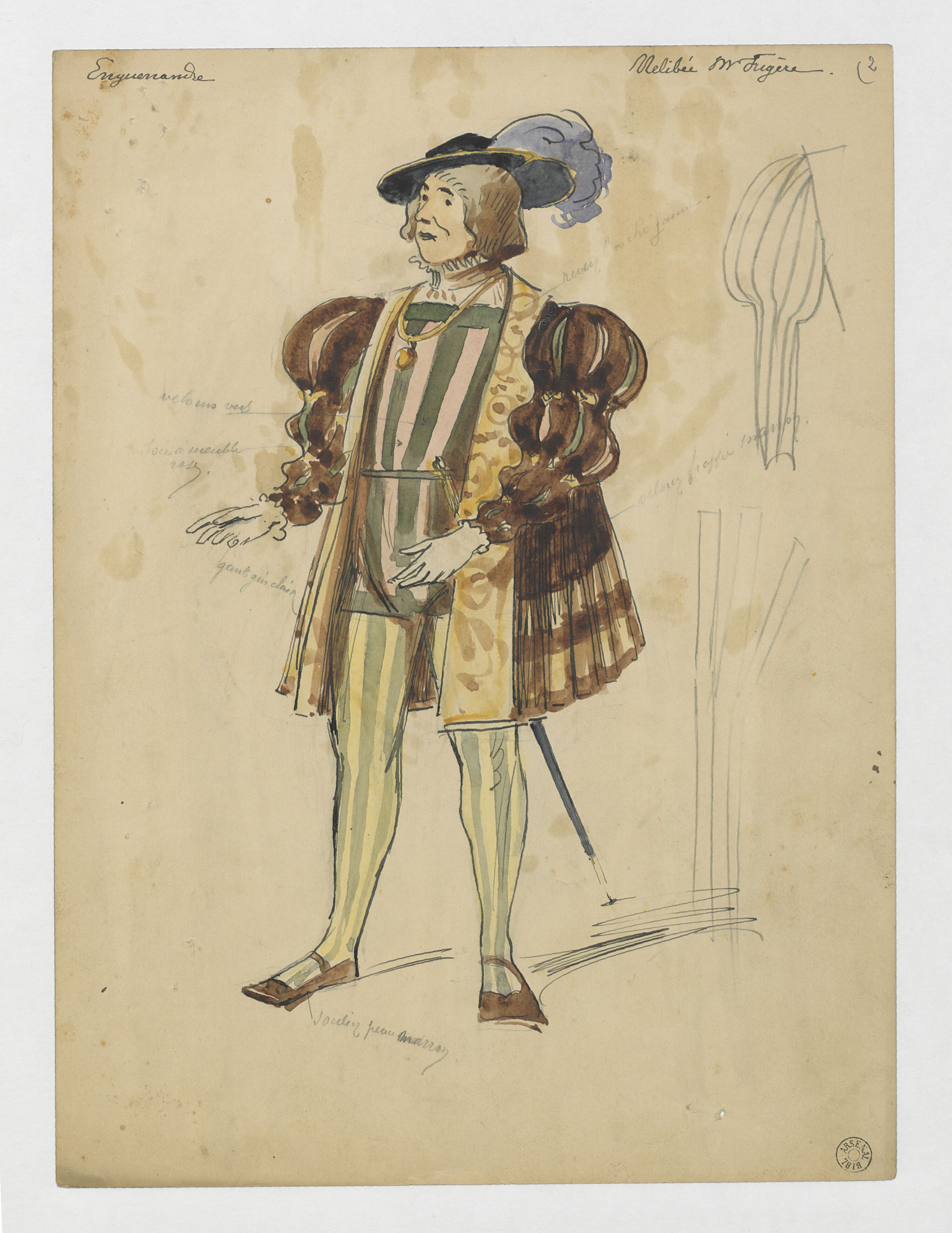

== Reception ==
The author of the libretto, Victor Wilder, was a Belgian musicologist, librettist, and journalist who wrote music reviews for several newspapers, notably Le Ménestrel and then Gil Blas. He was best known as the translator and adapter of numerous opera libretti into French, including those of Richard Wagner. As a critic, he was well known for his harshness. At the time of the premiere of Enguerrande, he was a former member of Le Ménestrel, where there were still people who had scores to settle with him. He was also active in the Wagnerian camp. The review of Enguerrande in Le Ménestrel was signed by Henri Moreno—alias Henri Heugel, son of the founder of Le Ménestrel. Le Ménestrel defended traditional French musical art and was critical of the aesthetic excesses of Wagnerism (and the composer, Théodore Dubois, was an anti-wagnerian). One columnist summed up this trend by stating that "Wagner brought boredom to the theater on a truly epic scale." In his article, Moreno recalls one of Wilder's caustic remarks at the premiere of Aben-Hamet (Théodore Dubois's opera on a libretto by Léonce Détroyat) on 16 December 1884: "Zulema, the mother, is a silly old goose, and Alfaïma and Bianca are two gobbling turkeys. As for Aben-Hamet, he's not just the last of the Abencerrages — he's also the biggest donkey you'll ever see on stage."

The harshest criticisms on Enguerrande undoubtedly come from Moreno, in Le Ménestrel: he recalls that while the public and critics had praised Dubois's opera, "the small clan of certified Wagnerians had vilified it, particularly those Wagnerians who were exclusive and close-minded, grumpy and arrogant", undoubtedly a description of Wilder. The premiere of Enguerrande thus gave anti-Wagnerian critics the opportunity for a rematch. Moreno criticised the libretto, stating that "His 'drama' Enguerrande is nothing more than old Scribe, minus the skill and finesse that this author, so despised by the new decadent classes, knew how to bring to this kind of thing." In this libretto, Moreno recognised "two distinct currents, each following its own path without ever uniting or merging": the one due to Bergerat ("impulsive, more than brilliant, dazzling, casually throwing around rare terms and picturesque rhymes, full of exuberance and fantasy"); the other due to a man "who never quite managed to shed his Flemish roots, despite more than twenty years of Parisian asphalt, stale common sense, pondering over each point and every comma, never uttering a word without having carefully weighed it, a solid fighter, with a somewhat limited, yet not insignificant, vocabulary."

The audience's reaction was not enthusiastic. Even during the dress rehearsal, they laughed a little too much. Moreno regrets that the authors did not "push things even further." He adds: "They would have had the chance to repeat the legendary success of L'Auberge des Adrets [by Benjamin Antier, Polyanthe and Saint-Amand], which is famous for its character Robert Macaire, which was initially a dark drama lacking any kind of spice, and which Frédérick Lemaître's verve transformed, in a stroke of genius, into an epic comedy. The transformation would have been just as easy for Enguerrande, and it is regrettable that the authors did not think of it. It is so good to laugh a little!"

Moreno has reservations about the quality of the performance: "The singers were thrown off balance by the sarcasm of the audience, who had decided to laugh at everything rather than be bored." A. Ragourd, the critic of La Diane, is less harsh, noting that "Mr Gibert is improving; he sings the role of Gaëtan with accents of tenderness to which his brilliant but somewhat rough voice has adapted." Ragourd also compliments the orchestra and its conductor, but begins by pointing out that "the play flopped from the very first night." He added: "The play was staged without much expense or care by the management; then, having searched in vain for an Enguerrande in Paris, they fell back on a provincial singer who was not up to the task of playing such a role; finally, the libretto, which had been reworked and reworked, was too fanciful; so the enthusiastic audience laughed at everything, listening for the slightest word to make fun of." The critic of La Cocarde notes that "in many places, the 'lyrical' (?) version is written in a form and language that are not worthy of the purest poetry", which undoubtedly reveals his consummate mastery of understatement.

The critics hailing the new opera are essentially those writing in Gil Blas, Théodore Massiac and Richard O'Monroy. They are conscious of some weaknesses but do not really acknowledge them. O'Monroy attempts to justify the libretto's excessive fantasy by placing it within a grand tradition that includes Shakespeare and Molière: the libretto says that the story is set in a fantastical version of Sicily during an imagined time. He reminds his readers of the historical and cultural significance of Italy, especially Sicily, as a setting for lyrical poetry and drama. The island's diverse and dramatic landscapes have inspired poets, including Shakespeare and Molière. The article specifically mentions Molière's Le Sicilien ou l'Amour peintre, a play full of fantasy and imagination, which was soon to be revived at the Comédie-Française.

His colleague takes issue with the staging – but in a light-hearted, humorous way: "I seem to remember seeing the backdrop in Cavalleria rusticana, and the palace on the left in Benvenuto Cellini, but hey, Italy is still Italy."

Basically, what bothered them most was the music. For Massiac there were in the past too many "pages without real meaning, without sincerity, without depth." He concludes that "art needed to be reformed and renovated, and powerful minds came along and sparked a 1789-style revolution in dramatic music." The French are at the forefront of this movement, and Chapuis "is one of the best in this noble battalion." This explains why some (not real musicians) may not have loved the opera : "Furthermore, although the young musician's work as a whole may be a little dense, heavy and overflowing, it nonetheless contains remarkable qualities, qualities of the highest order for any musician." The work is therefore a great success, even if the young Chapuis still has room for improvement: "If only the orchestration were not so abundant! Mr Chapuis, like all beginners, has yet to learn the art of moderation; he wants to say everything, and say it all at once! Nevertheless, his score is of the utmost interest..."

In the second article devoted to Enguerrande in that day's edition of Gil Blas, O'Monroy begins by mentioning the presence of notable figures, the Prince of Sagan and the Marquis de Beauvoir, and later places himself under the authority of the very popular Rodolphe Salis (owner of Le Chat Noir) to win over the audience. He then recounts the plot of the opera, highlighting the encores and curtain calls that certain numbers elicited.

The critic of La Diane points out, however, that it was the composer whose name "was applauded when the curtain fell", while Moreno emphasises the fact that although the libretto gave Chapuis a hard time, he managed quite well: "His score, somewhat dull on the whole and often disjointed, nonetheless contains passages that do him credit. The choruses are remarkably well handled and beautifully sonorous. We love the entire beginning of the work, solidly grounded with its pretty ballad of the Seagulls, the Woodcutter's song in the second act, which has style, the entire vigorous finale of the call to arms, and the love duet in the fourth act. At times, there is a little muddiness in the orchestration, and at other times, inexplicable gaps. In summary, it is a work that shows promise for the future, without being subversive in any way."

== Summary ==
The first act begins in a public square in Palermo. King John III is dying. In the cathedral, the people sing a "Kyrie eleison" to thank the Lord for finally delivering them from this "fatal tyrant whom no friend mourns", has caused the deaths of many innocents, has sold justice, and has exiled his best subjects. However, the archbishop emerges from the palace and touches the hearts of the people with his words of charity. They follow him to the cathedral, where he prays for the dying man. Only Noema, a young flower girl, remains behind, unwilling to join the others. Her father is exiled. When will she see him again? She abandons herself to a touching, melancholy reverie, which is interrupted by a gentleman who questions her. The king's heir is Gaetan XII. He is beloved in Palermo, and Noema herself speaks enthusiastically of him. Everything is fine; he will be king. But Noema objects, saying that Gaetan would refuse the crown. Why? Could he be in love? Without a doubt. With whom? With everyone! "He will be king!" exclaims the delighted gentleman. "I will be the one to force him to accept!"

Just then Gaetan arrives, accompanied by his friends Arias, Orliz, and several beautiful and honest ladies. Noema greets him with a cry of "Long live our king Gaetan XII!" and immediately runs away. Gaetan laughs at the child's innocence. He will not accept the throne, because one day when he was only twelve years old, his mother showed him a man being pursued by a screaming crowd and said to him: "That is a king." And she added: "My son, swear to me that you will never expose yourself to such ignominy." He swore, and he will not break his oath. His uncle John III is dying, but he, Gaétan, will be far away before the end comes. Meanwhile, the unknown gentleman approaches the prince. His name is Mélibée, ambassador of the noble princess Enguerrande of Corsica, Gaétan's cousin and, after him, the closest heir to John III. "Let her reign, then!" says Gaétan cheerfully. "There is an even better option", replies Mélibée. "Why don't you reign together?" The proposal surprises Gaétan for only a moment, and the prince dictates a sarcastic letter to his page, in which he apologizes to the princess for refusing her hand, and ends with: "Forgive this prince of fools, cousin, who loves you too much to marry you." Suddenly, the cannon booms, the crowd rushes to the square; Noéma throws herself at Gaétan's feet: "Sire, have mercy on the outlaws!" "Ask Queen Enguerrande to let them return", replies the prince, while the people cheer his name.

The second act begins in a wild location on the edge of a forest, not far from the sea, a few miles from Palermo. The only sign of human presence is a poor hut, home to a woodcutter, a rough man who is waiting for a violent storm to end so he can go to work in the woods. He is about to leave when the princess and Melibée arrive, wet from the rain and looking for shelter. Princess Enguerrande, after expressing her anger at the insolent Gaetan, whose impertinent letter Melibée has given her, enters the woodcutter's hut. Mélibée begins to reflect on the very nature of women and would continue to do so for a long time if he did not notice a couple approaching : Gaétan and Noéma. Mélibée immediately sends the rustic to deliver a note to the mayor of Palermo, then hides.

Gaétan appears, holding Noéma by the hand. He means no harm; he met the young girl in the woods and protected her as best he could from the storm. Now she is returning to the city. She asks Gaëtan once again for her father's forgiveness, tells him of her good fortune, refuses him a kiss, and leaves. It is then that Mélibée appears, leading Gaëtan to look through a crack in the shutter of the cabin window. "Heavens!" cries the prince, "is it possible? What have I seen? Gaëtan cannot contain his excitement, he expresses it in fiery terms, when Princess Enguerrande interrupts him as she emerges from her retreat. At first surprised to meet this stranger, she becomes furious when she learns that this man has dared to look at her. He must die. He does not defend himself. He presents his dagger to the princess and says, "Strike!" She is about to do so, but an unexpected turmoil stops her. She cannot kill this guilty man who offers himself so humbly to her blows. However, she will only forgive him on condition that he marries her. And to marry her, he only has to avenge the insult that Gaëtan has inflicted on her. The prince can no longer resist, he betrays himself: Gaëtan is him! You! Gaëtan? Wretch! Suddenly, footsteps, a procession. It is the notables, the standard-bearers, the soldiers of Palermo, who come to greet the prince and once again offer him the throne of Sicily. He persists in his refusal and indicates his cousin Enguerrande as the only one worthy of wearing the crown. Enguerrande agrees, and pointing at Gaétan, she orders in a haughty voice: Seize this man, he is my prisoner.

In the third act, Gaëtan is being held prisoner. His prison is an apartment located in a wing of the queen's palace. In a superb workshop, the prince devotes himself to sculpture, his favorite art form. He has even almost completed a statue of Enguerrande in the nude. It is clear that love unites Gaëtan and Enguerrande, even though they are unaware of it. Although she admires the marble in which her beauty shines, she breaks it in a fit of anger, yet she loves him and burns with passion. Ah! If only Gaëtan would agree for a moment to be king! He will agree: Noéma will perform this miracle by reminding him that she is still waiting for her unfortunate father's pardon. She has the queen's signature; let him add his own, and the outlaw will return. Enguerrande joins her voice to Noéma's, and Gaëtan no longer resists. He signs! But he is king! He has broken the oath he swore to his mother! "No", replies Enguerrande, "for I am no longer queen. Let us leave this palace and go far away to hide our happiness!" They flee...

What a commotion! The crowd rushes to the palace, led by the woodcutter we have already seen. He comes to sound the alarm: the homeland is in danger, the Neapolitan fleet is landing an enemy army on its shores. "Where is the leader? Where is the king?" "He abdicates, he shirks his duty." "It doesn't matter", cries the fierce woodcutter, "we'll fight without him. We'll get our skins shot through for you, flag without an eagle!"

Act 4 begins in the forest at dawn. While the people of Palermo rush to arms, Gaëtan and Enguerrande, in the enchanted forest, mingle the intoxication and ecstasy of their love with the thousand melodious sounds, the breaths, and the scents of immortal nature. Entwined, distraught, they listen to everything that sings. To describe the happiness that consumes them, their souls merge with the scattered soul of things... when, suddenly, a harsh song draws nearer. It is the soldiers leaving for war, hurling insults and contempt at Gaëtan. If he stays there, he is nothing but a coward! "A coward!" He leaps up. Enguerrande holds him back at first, but then, at a new insult, she puts a sword in his hand and says, "Go fight." He rushes off. Alas! Will he return? He will return, victorious, triumphant, but mortally wounded, and will die in Enguerrande's arms. Gaëtan's end calls for hers, and she falls dead on the body of her beloved! ... Final chorus in homage to the couple, the curtain slowly descends.
