= Henry VIII (opera) =

Opera in four acts by Camille Saint-Saëns

- Opera by Camille Saint-Saëns
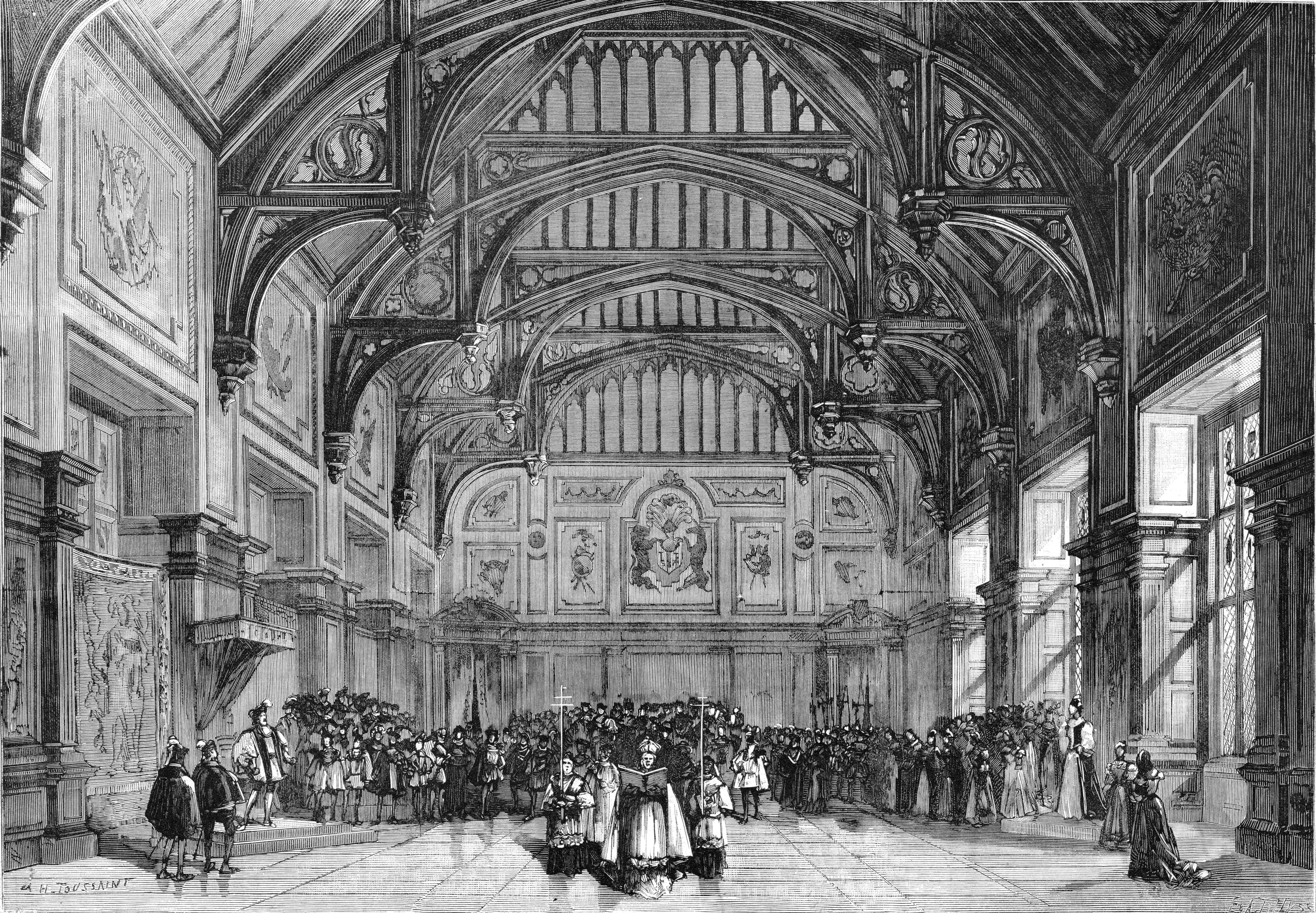
- Setting for the premiere, evoking Westminster Hall
- Librettist: Léonce Détroyat; Armand Silvestre
- Language: French
- Based on: El cisma en Inglaterra by Pedro Calderón de la Barca
- Premiere: 5 March 1883; Académie Nationale de Musique, Paris

Henry VIII is an opera in four acts by Camille Saint-Saëns, from a libretto by Léonce Détroyat and Armand Silvestre, based on El cisma en Inglaterra (The Schism in England) (1627) by Pedro Calderón de la Barca.

The opera covers the period in Henry VIII's life when the king was attempting to divorce Queen Catherine of Aragon in favour of marrying Anne Boleyn, a move rejected by the Church.

== Composition history ==
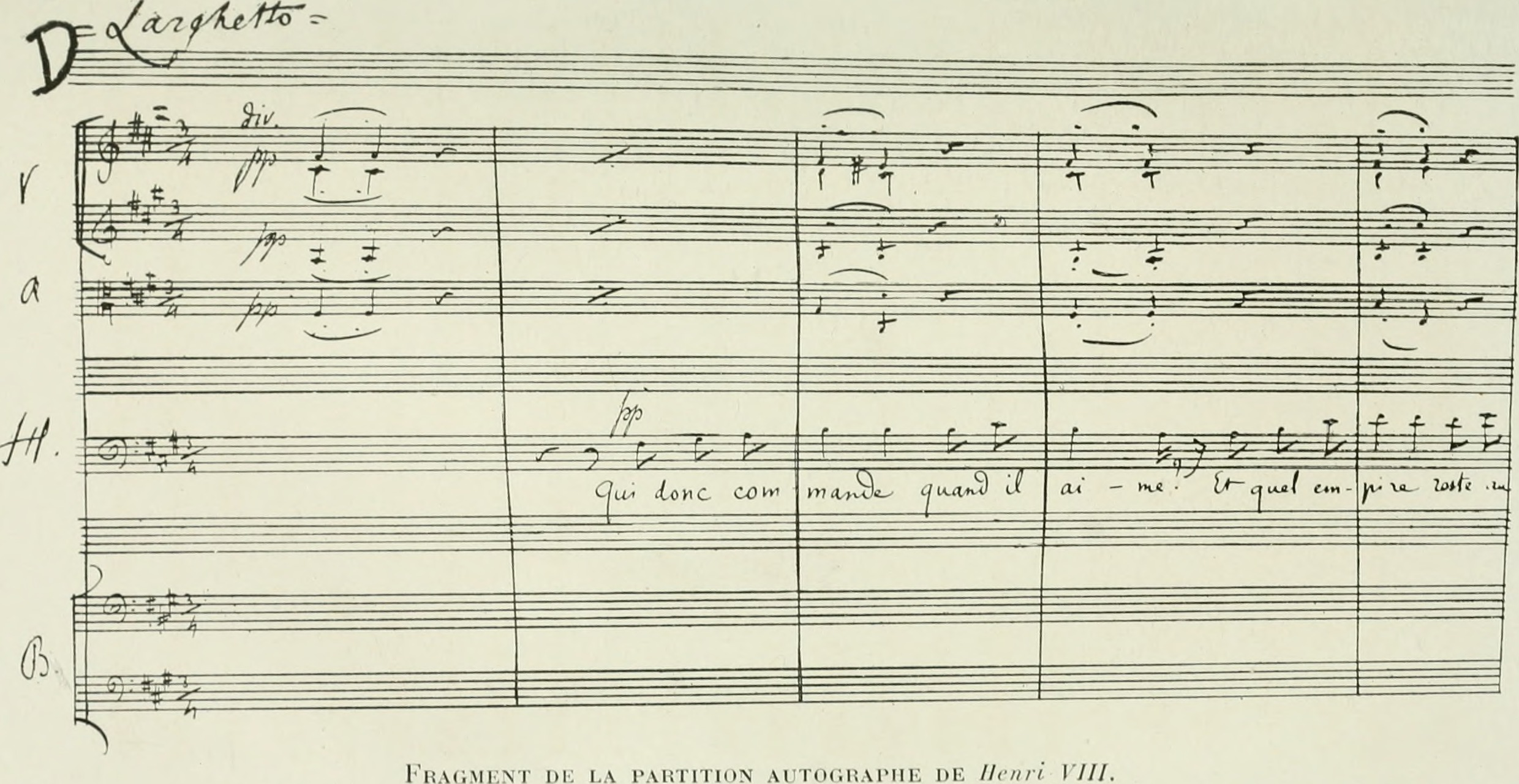
Fragment of the sheet music as depicted in Saint-Saëns (1914) by Lucien Augé de Lassus

In an effort to evoke the historical context, Saint-Saëns researched English music from the period and incorporated several English, Scottish, and Irish folk melodies into his score, as well as two airs by William Byrd (c. 1540–1623), contained in The Will Forster Virginal Book (1624), the "Carman's Whistle" and a section of a tune called "The New Medley". He also sampled from Benjamin Cosyn's Virginal Book (1620), using the opening from the tune "Mr Beauins Service", along with "Te Deum". Henry VIII died in 1547, about 70 years before these compositions were published.

== Performance history ==
Henry VIII was premiered on 5 March 1883 by the Paris Opera at the Palais Garnier in Paris. The choreography was by Louis Mérante, the costumes were designed by Eugène Lacoste, and the settings were by Antoine Lavastre and Eugène Carpezat (act 1), Jean-Baptiste Lavastre (act 2 and act 4, scene 2), and Auguste Alfred Rubé and Philippe Chaperon (act 3, scene 2, and act 4, scene 1). The opera was revived in three acts on 19 July 1889 with the ballet organized by Joseph Hansen. A new production in the original four-act version, directed by Paul Stuart, premiered on 18 June 1909, with choreography by Léo Staats, costumes by Charles Bianchini, and sets by Carpezat, Marcel Jambon and Alexandre Bailly. Henry VIII remained in the repertoire of the Opéra until 1919.

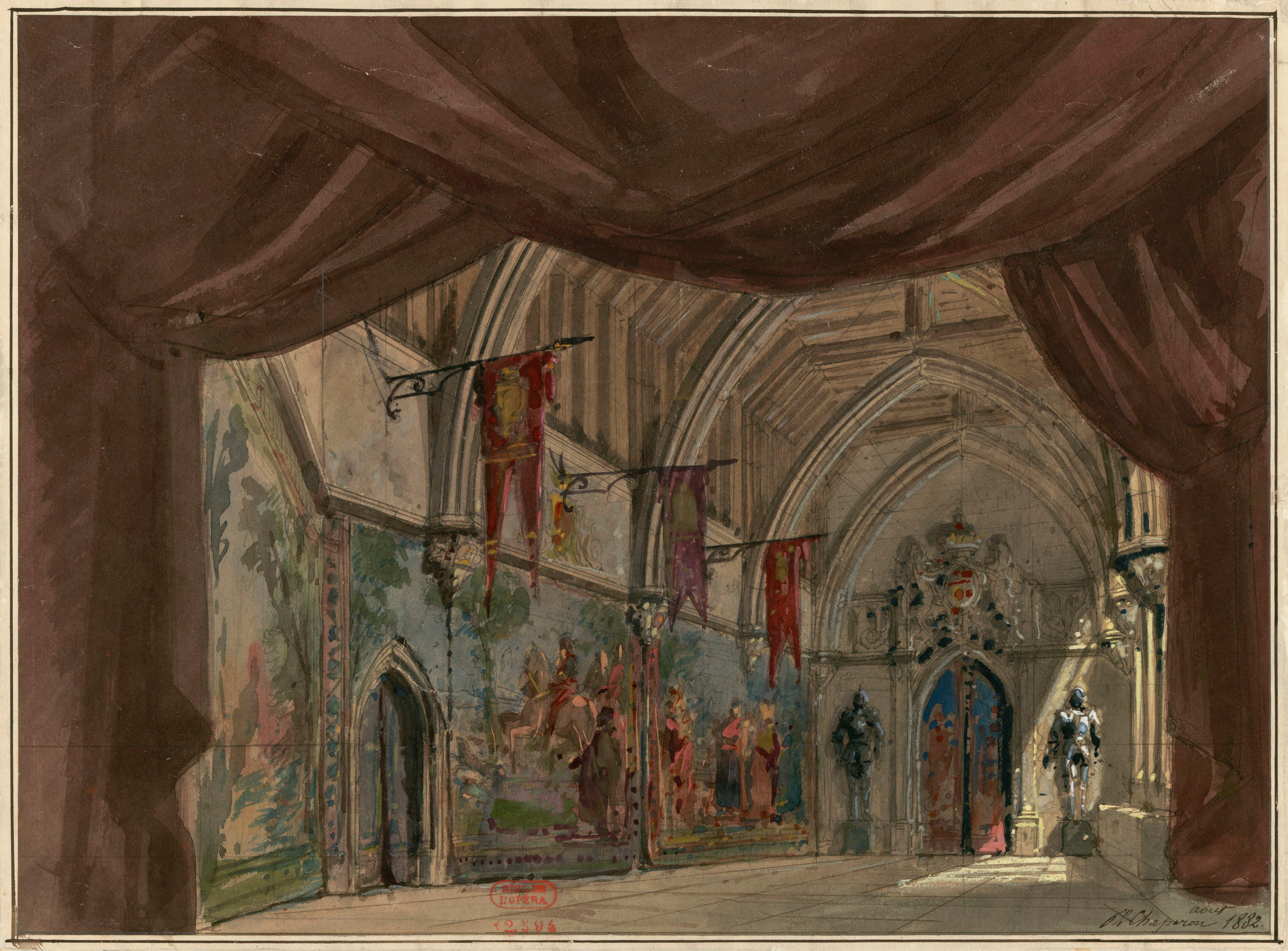
Scene design act 3 by Chaperon

It was also seen at the Royal Opera House, London, in 1889 with Maurice Renaud in the title role, Lina Pacary as Catherine d'Aragon, and Meyriane Héglon as Anne Boleyn. It was revived in 1991 at the Théâtre Impérial de Compiègne in a production by Pierre Jourdan, with Philippe Rouillon as Henry VIII, Michèle Command as Catherine of Aragon and Lucile Vignon as Anne Boleyn. The production was made into a film.

The United States premiere was presented by Bel Canto Opera in New York City on 27 April 1974 with Jason Byce as Henry VIII, Francesca Lawton-Sherman as Queen Catherine, Katherine Basler as Anne Boleyn under the musical direction of Susan Peters.

Performances were given at the Liceu in Barcelona in 2002 where it was staged once again by Pierre Jourdan with Montserrat Caballé as Catherine, Simon Estes as Henry and Nomeda Kazlaus as Anne Boleyn, with José Collado conducting.

A concert performance was given at the Bard College Music Festival, Annandale-on-Hudson, on 20 August 2012, with Ellie Dehn as Catherine, Jason Howard as Henry, and Jennifer Holloway as Anne Boleyn. Leon Botstein conducted. Botstein also conducted a fully staged performance of the work at the 2023 Bard Summerscape festival.

== Roles ==
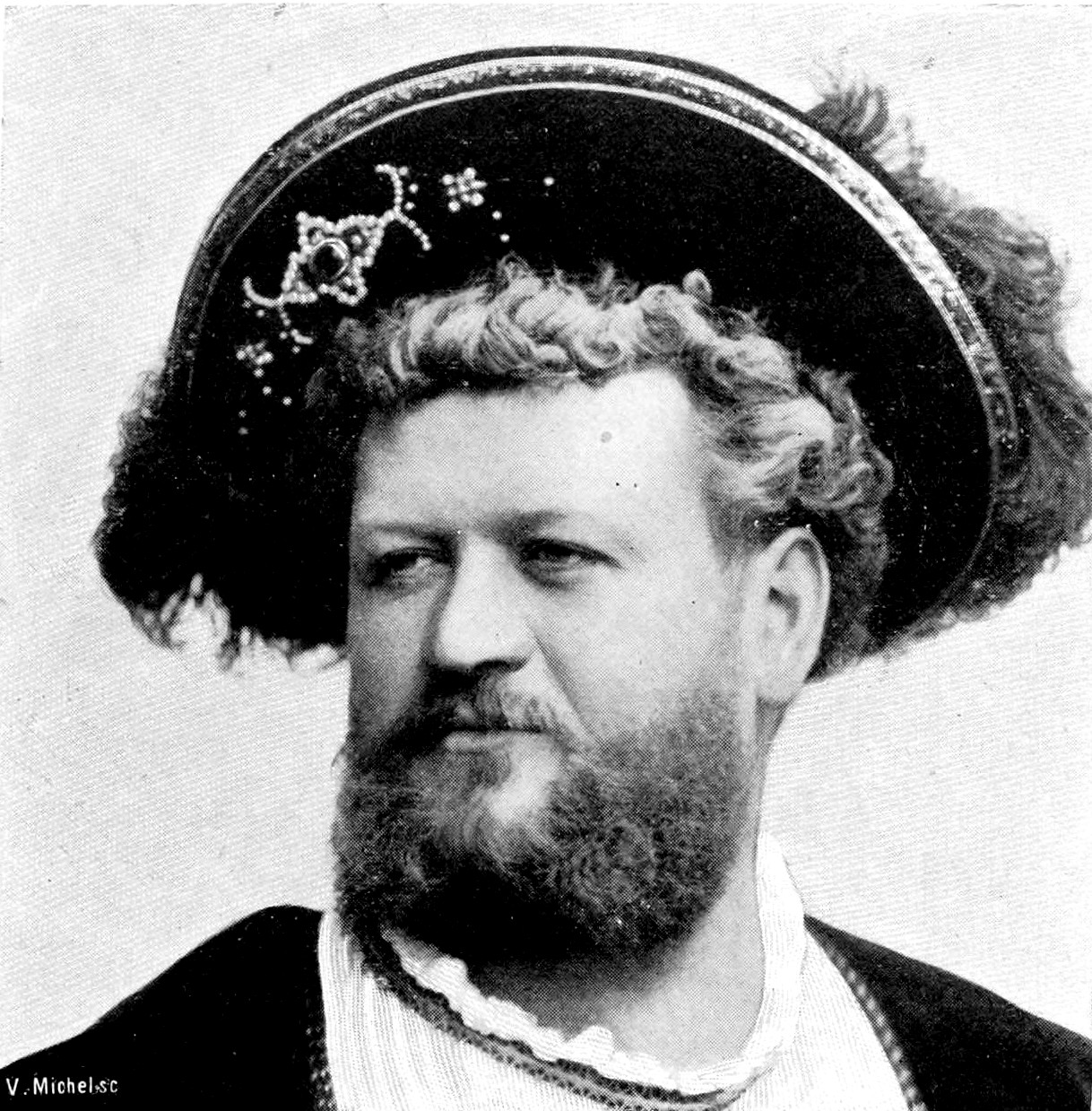
Jean Lassalle

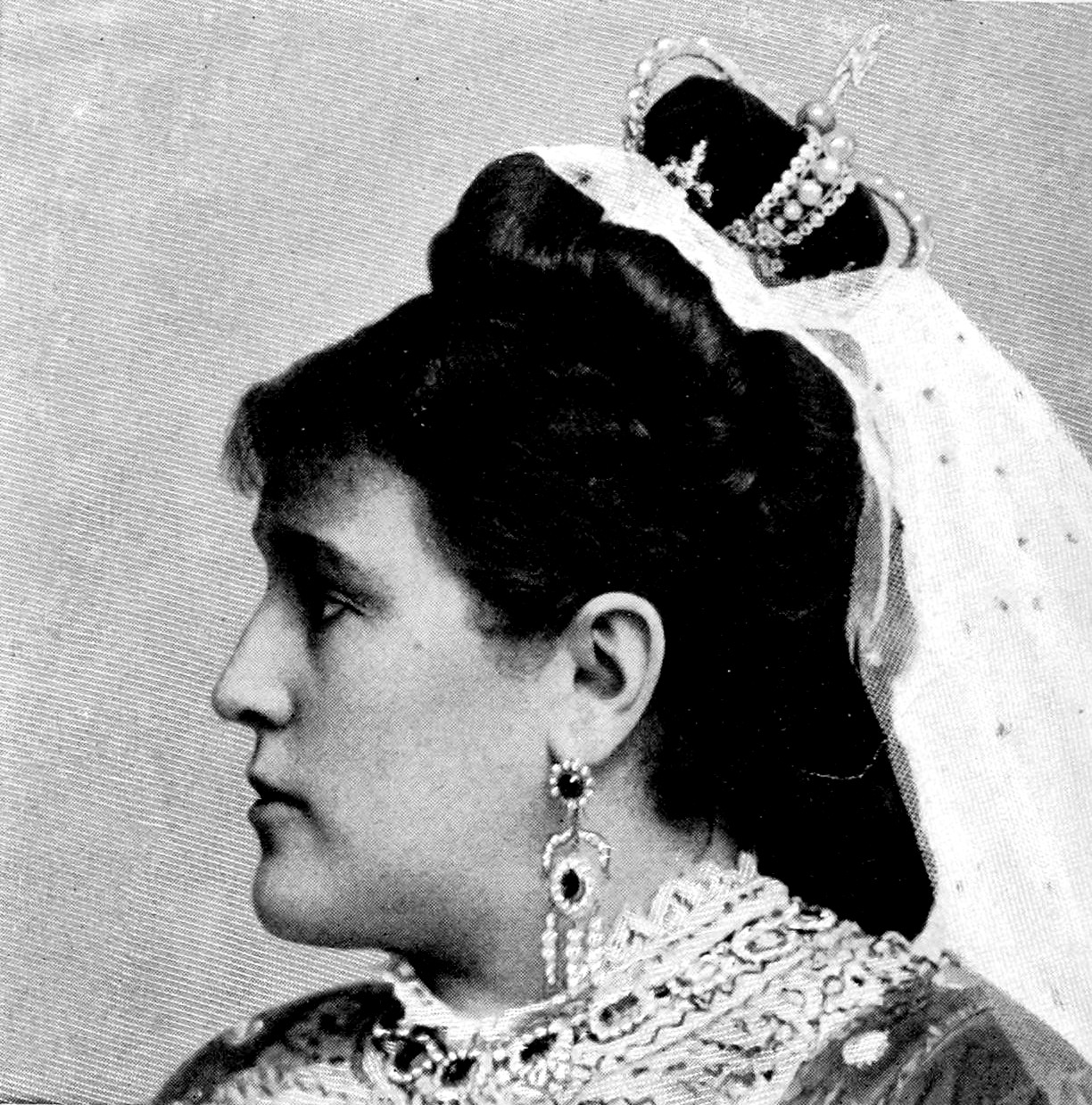
Gabrielle Krauss

Roles, voice types, premiere cast
Role	Voice type	Premiere cast, 5 March 1883 Conductor: Ernest Altès
Henry VIII	baritone	Jean Lassalle
Catherine d'Aragon	soprano	Gabrielle Krauss
Anne Boleyn	mezzo-soprano	Alphonsine Richard
Lady Clarence	soprano	Mlle Nastorg
Don Gomez de Féria	tenor	Étienne Dereims
Cardinal Campeggio, papal legate	bass	Auguste Boudouresque
Le duc de Norfolk	bass	Eugène Lorrain
Le comte de Surrey	tenor	Étienne Sapin
Cranmer, Archbishop of Canterbury	bass	M. Gaspard
Garter King of Arms	tenor	M. Malvaut
Bailiff	bass	M. Boutens

== Recordings ==
- Philippe Rouillon (Henry), Michèle Command (Catherine), Lucile Vignon (Anne Boleyn), Alain Gabriel (Don Gómez), conducted by Alain Guingal. Le Chant du monde. 1991 (also available as a DVD, Kultur International Films)
- "Ô cruel souvenir!" (Catherine) Véronique Gens on Tragédiennes 3, Les Talens Lyriques, Christophe Rousset (2011, Virgin Classics)
- Complete recording of 1883 version, 4 CDs – Michael Chioldi (Henry), Ellie Dehn (Catherine), Hilary Ginther (Anne Boleyn), Yeghishe Manucharyan (Don Gómez), Gil Rose conducting the Odyssey Opera (2022, Odyssey Opera OO1005)
