= Pedro de Zalamea =

Grand opera in 4 acts by Benjamin Godard

Pedro de Zalamea Op. 79, is an 1884 grand opera in 4 acts by Benjamin Godard to a libretto by Léonce Détroyat and Paul Armand Silvestre after Calderón's The Mayor of Zalamea. It premiered 31 January 1884 in Antwerp, at the Théâtre Royal.

== Recordings ==
- Aria from Act I: Romance. "Combien de fois j'ai rêvé d'elle" (Alvar) Cyrille Dubois, Orchestre National de Lille and Pierre Dumoussaud, Alpha 2023
