= Lancelot (opera) =

Opera by Victorin de Joncières

Lancelot is a 1900 opera by Victorin de Joncières to a libretto by Louis Gallet and Édouard Blau. Dedicated to his wife, the opera premiered on 7 February 1900 at the Académie Nationale de Musique, Paris. A revival is scheduled for May 2022 at the Opéra de Saint-Étienne, conducted by Hervé Niquet.
