= Benjamin Godard =

French violinist and composer

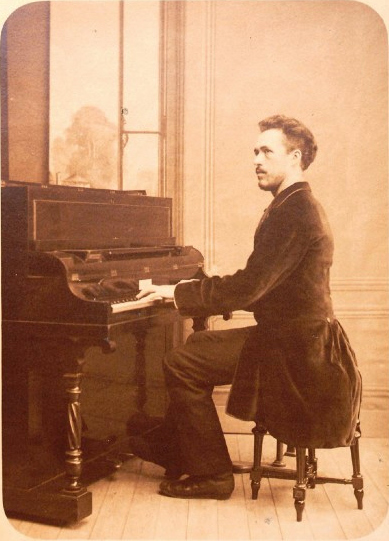
Benjamin Godard, c. 1880, Bibliothèque nationale de France

Benjamin Louis Paul Godard (18 August 1849 – 10 January 1895) was a French violinist and Romantic-era composer of Jewish extraction, best known for his opera Jocelyn. Godard composed eight operas, five symphonies, two piano and two violin concertos, string quartets, sonatas for violin and piano, piano pieces and etudes, and more than a hundred songs. He died at the age of 45 in Cannes (Alpes-Maritimes) of tuberculosis and was buried in the family tomb in Taverny in the French department of Val-d'Oise.

== Life and career ==
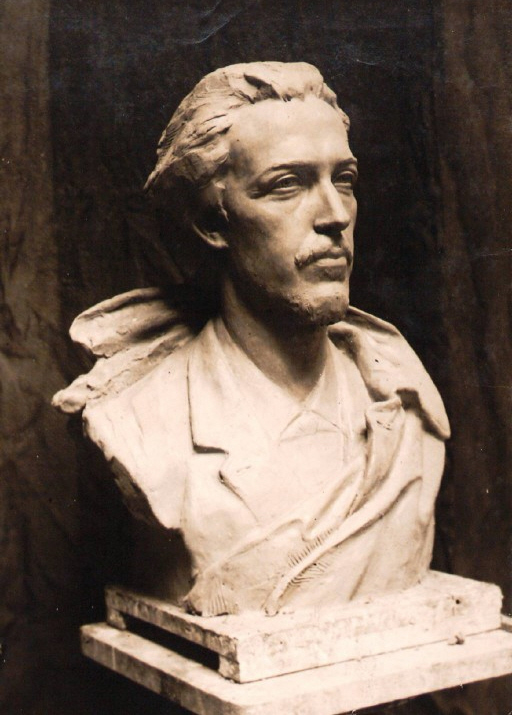
Plaster bust of Benjamin Godard by Ernest-Charles Diosi

Godard was born in Paris in 1849. He entered the Conservatoire de Paris in 1863 where he studied under Henri Vieuxtemps (violin) and Napoléon Henri Reber (harmony) and accompanied Vieuxtemps twice to Germany.

In 1876, his Concerto romantique was performed at the Concerts Populaires, and other of his large works were also performed at these concerts. In 1878, Godard was the co-winner of the Prix de la Ville de Paris. His winning composition, a dramatic symphony entitled Le Tasso, remains one of his most admired works.

From that time until his death Godard wrote a large number of compositions. These include eight operas, among them: Jocelyn (the "Berceuse" from which remains Godard's best-known composition), performed in Paris in 1888; Dante, played at the Opéra-Comique two years later; and La Vivandière, left unfinished and completed by Paul Vidal (1863–1931). The last of these was heard at the Opéra-Comique in 1895, and was played in England by the Carl Rosa Opera Company.

He became a professor at the Conservatoire de Paris in 1887, and was made a Chevalier (Knight) of the Légion d'honneur in 1889.

== Works ==
Godard's long list of works includes five symphonies: Symphonie gothique (1883), Symphonie orientale (1884), and Symphonie légendaire (1886); Concerto romantique for violin and orchestra (1876), two piano concertos, three string quartets, four sonatas for violin and piano, a sonata for cello and piano, two piano trios, and various other orchestral works. Among his piano pieces may be mentioned Mazurka No. 2, Valse No. 2, Au Matin, Postillon, En Courant, En Train, and Les Hirondelles. Florian's Song is also very popular and has been arranged for many instruments. Godard's fourth sonata for violin and piano contains a scherzo written in the unusual time signature of 5/4. He wrote more than 100 songs.

According to the Encyclopædia Britannica Eleventh Edition, "Godard's compositions are unequal, if only because his productivity was enormous. He was at his best in works of smaller dimensions. Among his more ambitious works, the Symphonie légendaire may be singled out as being one of the most distinctive."

Godard was opposed to the music of Richard Wagner and also highly critical of Wagner's antisemitism. Godard's musical style was more in tune with those of Felix Mendelssohn and Robert Schumann.

== Operas ==
Op.	Title	Genre	Subdivisions	Libretto	Première date	Place, theatre	Notes
	Les Guelfes	grand opéra	5 acts	Louis Gallet	17 January 1902	Rouen, Théâtre des Arts	composed 1880–82
	Pedro de Zalamea	opéra	4 acts	Léonce Détroyat & Paul Armand Silvestre	31 January 1884	Antwerp, Théâtre Royal	after Calderón's The Mayor of Zalamea
100	Jocelyn	opéra	4 acts	Paul Armand Silvestre and Victor Capoul, after a poem by Alphonse de Lamartine	25 February 1888	Brussels, Théâtre de la Monnaie	
111	Dante et Béatrice	drame lyrique	4 acts	Édouard Blau	13 May 1890	Paris, Opéra-Comique (Favart)	
125	Jeanne d'Arc	drame historique	5 acts	Joseph Fabre	13 January 1891	Paris, Théâtre du Châtelet	
	Ruy Blas						after Victor Hugo's Ruy Blas; composed in 1891; unperformed
	La Vivandière	opéra comique	3 acts	Henri Caïn	incomplete score: 21 March 1893	Brussels, Théâtre de la Monnaie	with orchestration completed by P. A. Vidal, 1 April 1895, Paris, Salle Favart
