= Nomeda Kazlaus =

Lithuanian opera singer

- Born: Vilnius, Lithuania
- Genres: Classical; vocal
- Occupation: Singer
- Instrument: Vocals
- Website: www.nomedakazlaus.com

Nomeda Kazlaus (born as Nomeda Kazlauskaitė in Vilnius, Lithuania) is a contemporary Lithuanian operatic soprano, an international opera diva who has appeared in leading roles in many European opera houses including the Gran Teatre del Liceu in Barcelona, the Mariinsky Theatre in Saint Petersburg, the Bolshoi Theatre in Moscow, and the Teatro Malibran in Venice. Nomeda Kazlaus is also TV host, producer, vocal professor, jury chair and member of many international competitions, laureate of four international singing competitions, winner of the Lithuanian Ministry of Culture Young Artist 2007 award.

== Biography ==
Born in Vilnius, Lithuania, on 13 February, Kazlaus has starred in international productions at venues including the St. John's Smith Square in London, the Grand Hall of the Kremlin's Gostiny Dvor in Moscow, Castel de Perelada in Spain, Moscow Tchaikovsky Concert Hall and Conservatoire Tchaikovsky Grand Hall.

She is giving guest appearances and leading role performances at Gran Teatre del Liceu, Barcelona; Moscow's Bolshoi Theater; Teatro Alighieri, Ravena; Malibran Theater, Venice; Mariinsky Theater, St. Petersburg; Pergola Opera Festival, Wroclaw; Cankarjev Dom in Ljubljana, Slovenia; Kazan Opera and Ballet Theatre, Russia; Lithuanian National Opera Theatre, Wroclaw Philharmonics, Poland; Lithuanian National Philharmonic.

She has been performing along a 20th-century opera legend Montserrat Caballe since 2000 (only one Lithuanian singer singing leading roles with M.Caballe).

Her operatic repertoire comprises title roles ranging from Wagner's Isolde and Brunhilde to Verdi's Elisabetta and Beethoven's Leonore.

Nomeda Kazlaus is author and host of the ‚Skambantys pasauliai su Nomeda Kazlaus’ (The Ringing Worlds with Nomeda Kazlaus) TV talk show series at the Lithuanian National TV where she interviews world-famous music and culture personalities like Montserrat Caballe (soprano, Spain), Andrea Bocelli (tenor, Italy), Plácido Domingo (tenor, Spain), Christoph Eschenbach (conductor, pianist), Sarah Brightman (soprano), Dmitri Hvorostovsky (baritone), Jean Michel Jarre (France), John Fisher (conductor, Metropolitan Opera Director), Sasha Walz (choreographer), Erwin Schrott (baritone), Jostein Gaarder (writer), Erwin Wurm (artist), Krzysztof Zanussi (film director), Krzysztof Penderecki (composer, conductor), Charles Castronovo (tenor), Alexander Markov (violinist), Jelena Bashkirova (pianist), Ruta Lee (actress), Constantine Orbelian (pianist, conductor), Lawrence Brownlee (tenor), Ivan Monighetti (cellist), Montserrat Marti (soprano), Eimuntas Nekrošius (stage director, Lithuania), Andrei Makarevich (singer).

In 2019 her TV Talk Show Skambantys pasauliai su Nomeda Kazlaus (The Ringing Worlds with Nomeda Kazlaus) won the name of the best TV Talk Show in 2018 in Lithuania (Lithuanian Radio and Television Commission Competition LRTK “Pragiedruliai”).

N.Kazlaus is a chair and member of J.Sibelius vocal competition JSFest in Finland (2017, 2018, 2019), a chair and member of Eurovision National Jury in Lithuania (2016, 2017); a chair of Lithuanian national singers‘ competition named after V. Jonuskaite-Zauniene; a chair of ‚Music Talent League’ (2016); jury member of the ‚Golden Voice‘ (‚Auksinis balsas‘) television project of the Lithuanian National TV (2013, 2014, 2016), jury member of Eurovision Song National Contest in Lithuania and jury chair person of the Lithuanian Jury of the Eurovision Song Contest 2016 (https://eurovisionworld.com/esc/eurovision-2016-jury-members).

Nomeda Kazlaus is a Founder and artistic director of the international annual vocal and stage acting masterclasses in Lithuania 'Nomeda Kazlaus Summer Academy of Vocal and Acting Techniques' ("Nomedos Kazlaus vokalo ir aktorinio meistriškumo vasaros akademija"), this project started in 2015 as ’Palanga Summer Academy’ (’Palangos vasaros akademija’).

In 2018 Lithuanian National TV released a documentary, The Singing Summer, about her summer academy, Nomeda Kazlaus's Summer Academy of Vocal Arts.

Kazlaus is author of singing master classes at the Lithuanian Music and Theater Academy (2014).

Her leading roles repertoire includes: Isolde in Wagner's Tristan und Isolde (Lithuanian National Philharmonic); Brunnhilde in Wagner's Die Walkure (First Lithuanian Brunnhilde, 20 premières - Teatro Alighieri, Ravenna, Italy; Cankarjev Dom, Ljubljana, Slovenia; Lithuanian National Opera Theatre); Leonore in L.van Beethoven's Fidelio (Lithuanian National Opera Theatre); Elisabetta in Don Carlo (Mariinsky Theatre in St. Petersburg, Russia); Anne Boleyn in Henry VII by C.Saint-Saens (sang with Montserrat Caballe and Simon Estes, Grand Teatre del Liceu, Barcelona, Spain); Desdemona in Otello (sang with Ian Storey, Pergola Opera Festival, Wroclaw, Poland); Sieglinde (cover) in Die Walkure (conductor Valery Gergiev, Bolshoi Theatre, Moscow, Russia); Ortlinde in Die Walkure (conductor Valery Gergiev, Bolshoi Theatre, Moscow, Russia); Marina Mnishek in Boris Godunov (Kazan Opera and Ballet Theatre, Russia); Carmen in Carmen (Kosice Opera Theatre, Slovakia); Eboli in Don Carlo (Lithuanian Lithuanian National Opera Theatre); Preziosilla in La Forza del Destino (First Lithuanian Preziosilla, sang with Sergej Larin, Lithuanian National Philharmonic).

Conductors she has worked with include Lord Yehudi Menuhin, Valery Gergiev, Constantine Orbelian, Vladimir Fedoseev, Saulius Sondeckis, José Collado, Anton Guadagno, Tugan Sokhiev, Jacek Kaspszyk, Alexander Sladkovski, Roberto Paternostro, Mikhail Sinkevich, Walter Attanasi, Miquel Ortega, Ewa Michnik, Modestas Pitrėnas, Juozas Domarkas, Robertas Servenikas, Martynas Staskus, Vytautas Lukocius.

Soloists she has performed with include Montserrat Caballe, Simon Estes, Ian Storey, Carlos Alvarez, Vasilij Gerello, Montserrat Marti, Vittorio Vitelli, Stefano Palatchi, John Keyes, Hector Sandoval, Alexander Markov, Oscar Marin, Louis Manikas, Sergejs Jegers, Olga Savova.

International reviewers (Opera News, Opera Now) describe the singer as being gifted with an impressive and powerful voice of rich and vibrant color, vast range, exceptional musicality, perfect pitch on every register, emotional precision, enchanting acting and personal charm.

The Beginning. Some important information. Kazlaus studied piano and musicology at the National M. K. Čiurlionis School of Art in Vilnius from the age of 6 and continued to the Lithuanian Academy of Music and Theatre, where she graduated with an arts licentiate degree. A professional pianist, Nomeda altered her musical career early in her studies to become an opera singer. Starting as a high dramatic mezzo-soprano, her professional debut was in the title role of Bizet's Carmen, followed by roles of Eboli in Don Carlos, Prezziosilla in La forza del destino, and others. Her current repertoire includes Brünnhilde and Sieglinde in Die Walküre, Elisabetta in Don Carlo, Desdemona in Otello and other roles in the dramatic soprano range.

Kazlaus' biggest breakthrough came in Andorra in 2000, during the master classes given by Spanish soprano Montserrat Caballé. Having witnessed her performance, Caballe greeted and complimented her: "We have a diva, a wonderful voice". The encounter led to an artistic collaboration between them, glimpses of which are featured in the documentary Caballe, Beyond Music (Morena Films, 2003) and in Montserrat Caballé 40 anys al Liceu (Fundacio Gran Teatre del Liceu, 2002). She was also a main guest at the Montserrat Caballé prasentiert Stars von Morgen (Franco-German ARTE TV) in 2001. A series of joint concerts soon followed, culminating in a Pierre Jourdan production of Henry VIII by Camille Saint-Saëns, featuring Montserrat Caballé as Catherine of Aragon, Simon Estes as Henry VIII and Nomeda Kazlaus as Anne Boleyn, conductor Jose Collado at the Grand Teatre del Liceu, Barcelona.

With an insight into the professional secrets of operatic figures such as Montserrat Caballe under her belt, Kazlaus has also gained a substantial amount of extra experience at a number of international vocal master classes with Montserrat Caballé, Anatolij Goussev, Ernst Haefliger, Francisco Araiza, Julia Hamari, Thomas Hemsley, Louis Manikas, and others. She has worked with theatre directors Pierre Jourdan, Eimuntas Nekrošius, Michal Znaniecki, Jurij Aleksandrov and others.

Kazlaus received the Richard-Wagner-Verband Bayreuth Grant (Germany) for dramatic soprano singers in 2003.

She has performed in leading roles and gala concerts at the Ravenna Festival in Italy, the Peralada Festival in Spain, Moscow Spring in Russia, Pergola Opera Festival in Wroclaw (Poland), Usedom (Germany) and other international festivals.

She has performed at St. John's, Smith Square in London, the Grand Hall of the Moscow Gostiny Dvor (with Montserrat Caballé, on the occasion of the inauguration of the hall), the Moscow Conservatory Tchaikovsky Grand Hall, the Moscow Philharmonic Grand Hall, the Wroclaw Philharmonic Hall (Poland), the Cankar Hall in Ljubljana (Slovenia), and at other international venues.

Kazlaus sang the role of Brünnhilde in more than 20 international performances of Richard Wagner's Die Walküre between August 2007 and April 2008.

In 2009, she released her solo album The Art of Dramatic Soprano with Lithuanian National Symphony Orchestra, conductor Modestas Pitrėnas.

In May 2010, Nomeda Kazlaus facilitated the arrival of Montserrat Caballé in Vilnius, where they gave a joint gala concert at the Lithuanian National Opera and Ballet Theatre to celebrate the tenth anniversary of their collaboration.

In 2013 she sang soprano part in "Polish Requiem" by Krzysztof Penderecki in Wroclaw Philharmonic Hall, Poland, 2013. 05. 24 and in Vilnius Festival, Lithuania, 2013.06.14 - the first performance of "Polish Requiem" in Lithuania on the occasion of 80 years anniversary of K.Penderecki and commemoration of the 20th anniversary of the re-establishment of diplomatic relations between Lithuania and Poland, soloists Nomeda Kazlaus (soprano, Lithuania), Agnieszka Rehlis (mezzo-soprano, Poland), Adam Zdunikowski (tenor, Poland), Liudas Mikalauskas (bass, Lithuania). Conductor - Jacek Kaspszyk (Poland, England); Wroclaw Philharmonic Symphony Orchestra, Kaunas State Choir (conductor - Petras Bingelis), State Choir "Vilnius" group of men (conductor - Povilas Gylys) at the Lithuanian National Opera and Ballet Theatre. Read more: Vilnius Festival 2013: Seven plus one for the 17th year, Gedulo ir vilties dieną skambės K. Pendereckio „Lenkiškasis Requiem“, Penderecki w Wilnie.

== Operatic repertoire ==
Verdi

- Un ballo in maschera Amelia
- Don Carlo Elisabetta
- Otello Desdemona
- Il trovatore Leonora
- Aida Aida
- La forza del destino Leonora
- Nabucco Abigaille
- Macbeth Lady Macbeth
- Attila Odabella
- A.Ponchielli La Gioconda La Gioconda

Puccini

- Tosca Floria Tosca
- Manon Lescaut Manon Lescaut
- Turandot Turandot
- Giordano Andrea Chénier Maddalena di Coigny
- Mascagni Cavalleria rusticana Santuzza

Wagner

- Die Walküre Brünnhilde, Sieglinde
- Siegfried Brünnhilde
- Parsifal Kundry
- Tannhäuser Elisabeth, Venus
- Lohengrin Elsa
- Der fliegende Holländer Senta
- Tristan und Isolde Isolde

Strauss

- Ariadne auf Naxos Ariadne, Primadonna
- Elektra Chrysothemis
- Rosenkavalier Die Feldmarschallin
- Salome Salome
- Beethoven Fidelio Leonore
- Massnet Le Cid Chimene
- Saint-Saëns Henry VIII Anne Boleyn
- Bizet Carmen Carmen

Tchaikovsky

- The Queen of Spades Lisa
- Eugene Onegin Tatjana
- Shostakovich Lady Macbeth of the Mtsensk District Katerina Izmailova
- Janáček Káťa Kabanová Káťa Kabanová
- Berg Wozzeck Marie
- Menotti The Consul Magda

== Concert repertoire ==
- Verdi Requiem
- Penderecki Polish Requiem
- Beethoven Symphony No. 9
- Strauss Vier Letzte Lieder
- Wagner Wesendonck Lieder
- Bruckner Te Deum
- Bruckner Mass No. 3 in F-minor
- Mahler Symphony No. 2

== Discography ==
- The Singing Summer (documentary film, 2018, Lithuanian National TV)
- The Art of Dramatic Soprano (Music Mills CD release 2009)
- Schubert's Mass in C-major Nr. 4, conducted by Yehudi Menuhin (live recording, Warner Classics CD release 2003)
- Recordationes de Christo moriendo by Paweł Łukaszewski (live recording, PRCD-003, Prior Musica/Prior Records CD release 2002)
