= Auguste Chapuis =

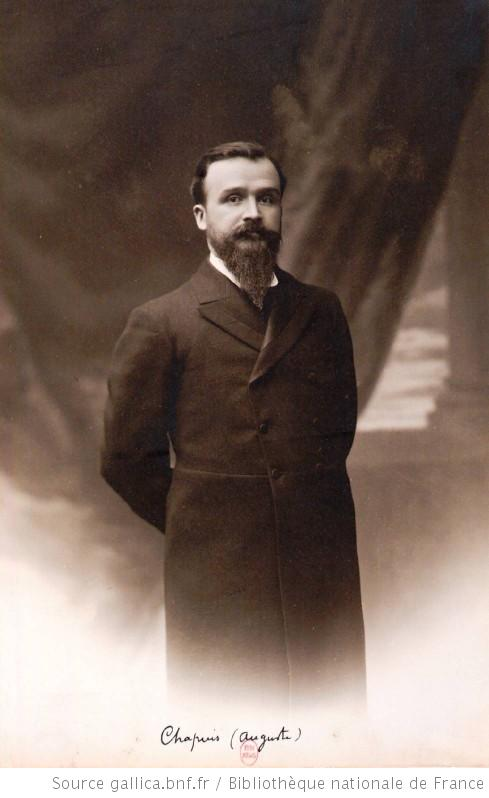
- Auguste Chapuis in 1905
- Born: 20 April 1858; Dampierre-sur-Salon
- Died: 6 December 1933 (aged 75); Paris
- Occupations: Composer, organist

Auguste Chapuis (French pronunciation: [oɡyst ʃapɥi]; 25 April 1858 – 6 December 1933) was a 19th/20th century French composer, organist, and professor. He was a student with César Franck. The rue Auguste-Chapuis in the 20th arrondissement of Paris was named after him when he died in 1933.

He was awarded the Prix Rossini in 1886 for Les Jardins d'Armide on a libretto by the playwright Émile Moreau.

In 1894, he succeeded Adolphe Danhauser as head of the municipal orphéon of Paris.

Two scores were dedicated to him, one by Jacques Charlot, Chanson (1910), for piano, and the other one by Samuel Rousseau, 12 Pièces for organ.

== Works (selection) ==
- Sept paroles du Christ, oratorio for soloists, choir, and orchestra, Notre-Dame-des-Champs Church, 1883, with Charlotte Jacquemont, a soprano student of Mr. Saint-Yves Bax, and Devineau, tenor, student of Crosti, and one hundred and fifty performers, conducted by Mr. Lucien Michelot, choirmaster.
- Les Jardins d'Armide, lyrical scene, or cantata (1886, libretto by Émile Moreau). Prix Rossini
- 2 Pièces pour violoncelle, avec piano (1890)*: Sérénade mélancolique; Badinage
- La source, three-part chorus a cappella on a poem by Théophile Gautier (1898)
- Solo de trompette en fa*, avec piano (1899)
- Enguerrande, lyrical drama in 4 acts and 5 tableaux, libretto by Victor Wilder after the poem by Émile Bergerat, created at the Opéra-Comique on 9 may 1892. Choudens 1892
- Poèmes d'amour, ten songs on poems by Rodolphe Darzens 1895
- Trimazô (Chanson de Mai). Poem by André Theuriet : P. Colin (Nîmes) 1895
- Sérénade pour violon solo et 3 violons concertants, Durand et fils, Paris, 1903
- Impressions sylvestres, 5 pieces for Cello & Piano (1906)
- Fantaisie concertante* for double bass and piano. Durand 1907
- Si mes vers avaient des ailes* and Aime celui qui t'aime, et sois heureuse (1909, poems by Victor Hugo)
- Hymne à la beauté, poem by Stéphan Bordèse (1847-1919), for high voice, Durand & fils (Paris) 1909
- En avril, dans les bois, Printemps triste, Mythologie (André Theuriet), 1909
- Le poème du travail* (1911, words by Maurice Bouchor) for tenor solo, choir and orchestra (70 pages)
- L'Alouette (Theuriet), choir for 3 voices, 1911
- Les deux ménétriers* (1912, poem by Jean Richepin), choir for 4 voices
- Piano trio* (1912)
- Méditation, for organ, 1912 in Maîtres contemporains de l’orgue, Vol.1
- La Chanson du Charbonnier (1903) - song of the Charcoal-burner (poem by André Theuriet), choir for 4 voices and orchestra
- Violin Sonata* (1921)
- * Les Demoiselles de St. Cyr, Opéra de Monte-Carlo, 19 April 1921 (composed much earlier)
- 2 Pièces pour hautbois et piano* (1922)
- Complainte de la Glu (poem by Jean Richepin), for voice and piano, 1922
- Harpe éolienne* (1923); Carillon; David devant l'arche, in Fresque marine, Vol. 1, by Alexander Rider (harp)
- Choral pour contrebasse et piano* (1924)
- 3 Pièces pour flûte et piano* (1927): Pastorale; L'étoile du berger; Faunes et dryades dansent au clair de lune
- Vocalise-Étude
- Three pieces for piano: L'Aurore sur le lac; Dans la montagne; Rondes enfantines. Durand 1931
- Ronde, score for 2 female voices or children song. Durand & Cie
- Tambourin, score for 2 female voices or children song. Durand & Cie
- Le Chêne abattu, choir for three equal voices. Score for chant. Durand & Cie
- Tercet, on a poem by A. Steenackers (Aline, Pierre Louÿs's wife?)
- Les caresses, ten songs on poems by Jean Richepin, Grus éditions, 1889
- Quatre mélodies, poems by Henri de Régnier (on lieder.net)

'*' Free scores on imslp.org
