= Pierre Léonce Détroyat =

French naval officer and politician (1829–1898)

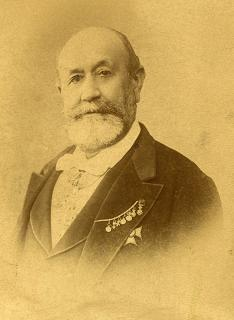

Pierre Léonce Détroyat (1829–1898) was a French naval officer, journalist, and author.

He was born at Bayonne (Basses-Pyrénées). He studied at the École Navale, took part in the Crimean War, and in the subsequent expedition to China, and accompanied Archduke Maximilian to Mexico as Under-Secretary of State for Naval Affairs and chief of the military cabinet. During the Franco-Prussian War, he was for a time in command of the camp at La Rochelle. From 1866 to 1869, he was a member of the staff of La Liberté, which he edited from 1869 to 1876. He subsequently founded Le Bon Sens, and L'Estafette, the latter a conservative and Bonapartist journal. In 1885-86 he edited the Constitutionnel.

== Works ==
His works include the following titles:

- La cour de Rome et l'empereur Maximilien (Paris, 1867)
- Du recrutement, de l'organisation et de l'instruction de l'armée française (On recruiting, organization and instruction for the French army, 1871)
- Le sénat et le scrutin de liste (1881)
- Nos possessions françaises en Indo-Chine (Our French possessions in Indo-China, 1887)
- Les chemins de fer en Amérique (Railroads in America, 1886)

=== Libretti ===
- Henry VIII, opera, 1883 (music by Camille Saint-Saëns),
- Pedro de Zalamea (with Armand Silvestre), opera, 1884 (music by Benjamin Godard),
- Aben-Hamet, opera in four acts and a prologue after Chateaubriand's The Adventures of the Last Abencerrage (music by Théodore Dubois).
