= Henri de Bornier =

French poet and dramatist (1825–1901)

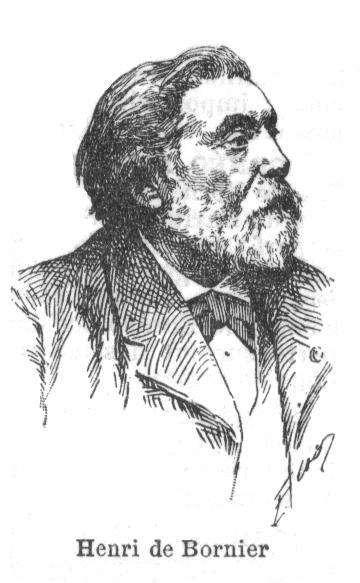
Henri de Bornier

Henri, vicomte de Bornier (French pronunciation: [ɑ̃ʁi də bɔʁnje]; 25 December 1825, Lunel – 28 January 1901, Paris) was a French poet and dramatist.

== Biography ==
He came to Paris in 1845 with the object of studying law, but in that year he published a volume of verse, Les Premieres Feuilles, and the Comédie-Française accepted a play of his entitled Le Mariage de Luther.

He was given a post in the library of the Arsenal, where he served for half a century, becoming director in 1889. In 1875, his heroic drama in verse, La Fille de Roland was produced at the Théâtre Français. The action of the play turns on the love of Gerald, son of the traitor Ganelon, for the daughter of Roland. The patriotic subject and the nobility of the character of Gerald, who renounces Berthe when he learns his real origin, procured for the piece a great success. The conflict between honor and love and the grandiose sentiment of the play inevitably provoked comparison with Corneille. The piece would indeed be a masterpiece if, as its critics were not slow to point out, the verse had been quite equal to the subject.

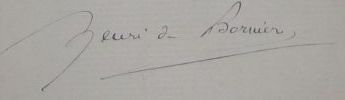
de Bornier's signature

Among the numerous other works of de Bornier should be mentioned: Dmitri (1876), libretto of an opera by Victorin de Joncières; and the dramas, Les Noces d'Attila (1880) and Mahomet (1888). The production of this last piece, on Islamic prophet Muhammad, was forbidden in 1890 in deference to the representations of the Turkish ambassador on behalf of Ottoman Sultan Abdul Hamid II. Henri de Bornier was critic of the Nouvelle Revue from 1879 to 1887. His Poésies complètes were published in 1894. He died in January 1901.

== See also ==
- Mahomet (play)
- Renée Marie Gouraud dʻAblancourt
