= Victorin de Joncières =

French composer and music critic (1839–1903)

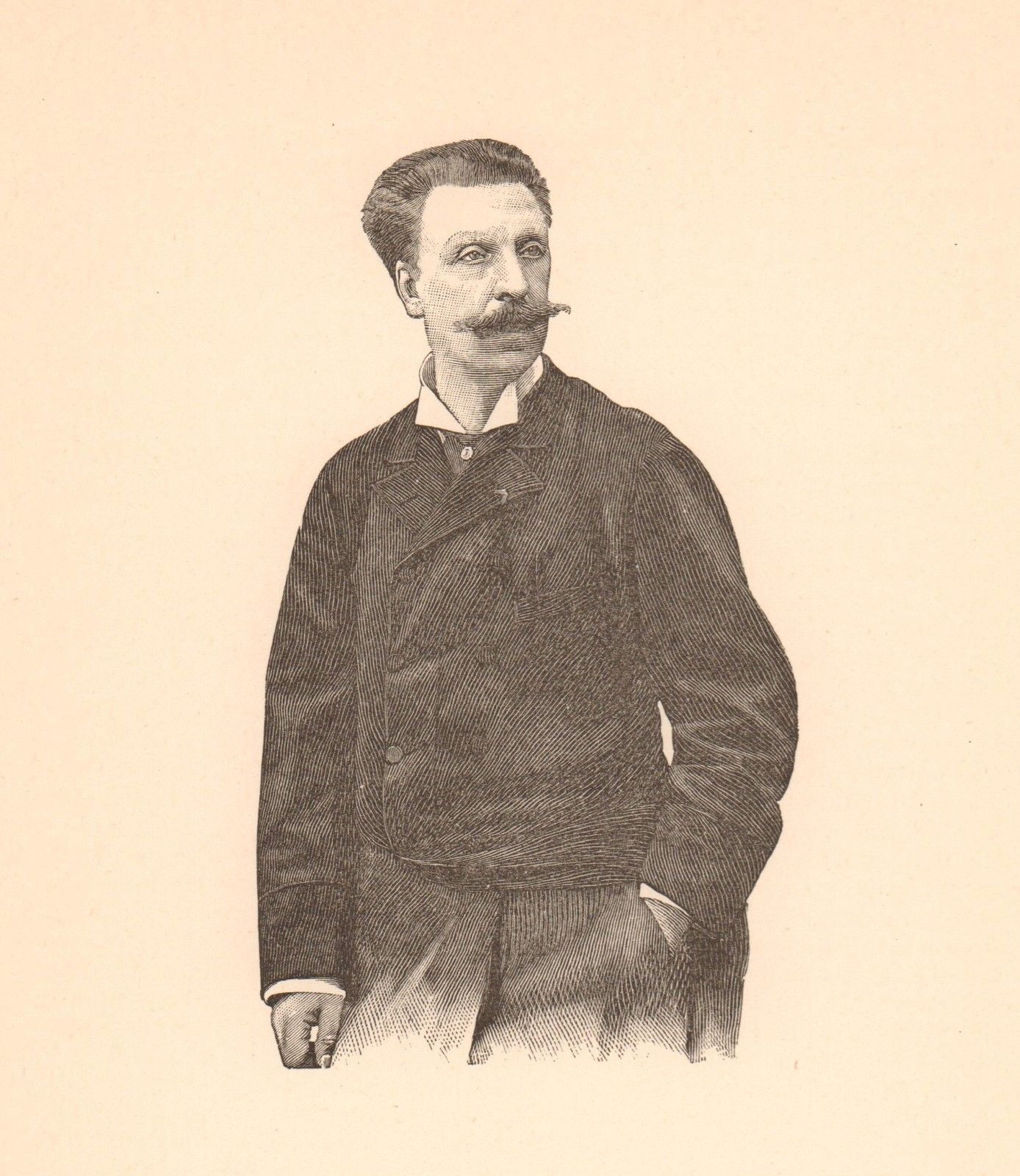
- Victorin de Joncières
- Born: 12 April 1839; Paris, France
- Died: 26 October 1903 (aged 64); Paris, France
- Education: François-Édouard Picot; Conservatoire de Paris
- Occupation: Composer

Félix-Ludger Rossignol (12 April 1839 – 26 October 1903), known as Victorin de Joncières (French pronunciation: [viktɔʁɛ̃ də ʒɔ̃sjɛʁ]), was a French composer and music critic.

== Biography ==
Son of a political writer and editor of La Patrie and Constitutionel, he was born at Paris, and his first musical lessons were from aunts. Leaving the Lycée Bonaparte at 16, he decided to study to be a painter, entering the studio of Picot. However, Joncières kept up his musical interest and had a short opéra comique performed by students of the Conservatoire de Paris, and was advised to abandon art and take up music. He entered the Conservatoire and followed the classes of Simon Leborne in fugue and counterpoint. However, after hearing one of Richard Wagner's first concerts in the French capital, he had a disagreement with the professors, and in 1860, abandoned his studies to devote himself to composition.

He composed some incidental music for Hamlet (performed both in Paris and Nantes), but found little success with two operas produced at the Théâtre Lyrique: Sardanapale (based on Byron, with Christina Nilsson, 1867) and Les Derniers jours de Pompéi (from the novel by Edward Bulwer-Lytton, 1869).

His violin concerto was played at the Conservatoire in 1870 by Jules Danbé, and a Symphonie romantique at the Concert national in 1873. His opera Dimitri (after Schiller's play Demetrius) had more success in 1876 and was revived in 1890 at the Opéra-Comique.

From 1871 to 1900, he wrote on music for La Liberté (using the pseudonym "Jennius"), penning biting criticisms of earlier opéra comique composers and of Berlioz.

Although Joncières presented his candidature for the Institut de France he was refused. He died in his native city of Paris.

== Works ==
Stage

- Incidental music for Hamlet, 1864
- Sardanapale (words by Henry Becque after Byron), Théâtre Lyrique, 8 February 1867
- Les Derniers jours de Pompéi, Théâtre Lyrique, 21 September 1869
- Dimitri (words by de Bornier, Silvestre and Carvalho after Schiller), Théâtre de la Gaîté, 5 May 1876
- La Reine Berthe (words by Jules Barbier), Opéra de Paris, 27 December 1878
- Le Chevalier Jean, (words by Gallet and Blau), Opéra-Comique, 11 March 1885
- Le Baron Frick (Ernest Depré, Clairville), operetta in 1 act (1885), written in collaboration with Georges Pfeiffer, Ernest Guiraud, and Francis Thomé
- Lancelot, (words by Gallet and Blau), Paris Opéra, 7 February 1900

Orchestral music

- Violin Concerto, Paris, 12 December 1869
- Symphonie romantique, Paris, 9 March 1873
- La Mer, ode symphonique, 1881
