= Ellie Dehn =

American soprano opera singer

- Born: Elizabeth Dehn; Anoka, Minnesota
- Education: Anoka High School, Oberlin Conservatory of Music, Academy of Vocal Arts
- Occupation: Opera singer

Ellie Dehn (born Elizabeth Dehn, 1980) is an American soprano.

== Biography ==
The daughter of Catherine Dehn and Douglas Dehn, Dehn was born and raised in Anoka, Minnesota. She is a 1998 graduate of Anoka High School, where she played flute and sang in the school choir. She received voice training from Judy Bender and sang in her high school's choir. She attended a vocal summer camp at Oberlin Conservatory of Music, where she later went to college. For graduate school, she attended the Academy of Vocal Arts in Philadelphia.

After seeing Dehn in a singing competition, Eve Queler of the Opera Orchestra of New York cast her as an understudy in Il Corsaro in 2005. Since then, Dehn has performed as Elvira in Don Giovanni at the Metropolitan Opera and the Countess in Le Nozze di Figaro at the Royal Opera House. She has been a frequent performer at San Francisco Opera, where she has performed as Musetta in La Boheme, Manon in Manon, Fiordiligi in Così fan tutte, and Arabella in Arabella. She has portrayed Donna Anna in Don Giovanni for San Francisco Opera, Opera Colorado, Michigan Opera Theatre, and Opera Memphis. Dehn has also performed on fellow Anoka native Garrison Keillor's radio show, A Prairie Home Companion.

Dehn has a daughter, Arabella, born in 2018.
