= Dante et Béatrice =

Opera in four acts by Benjamin Godard

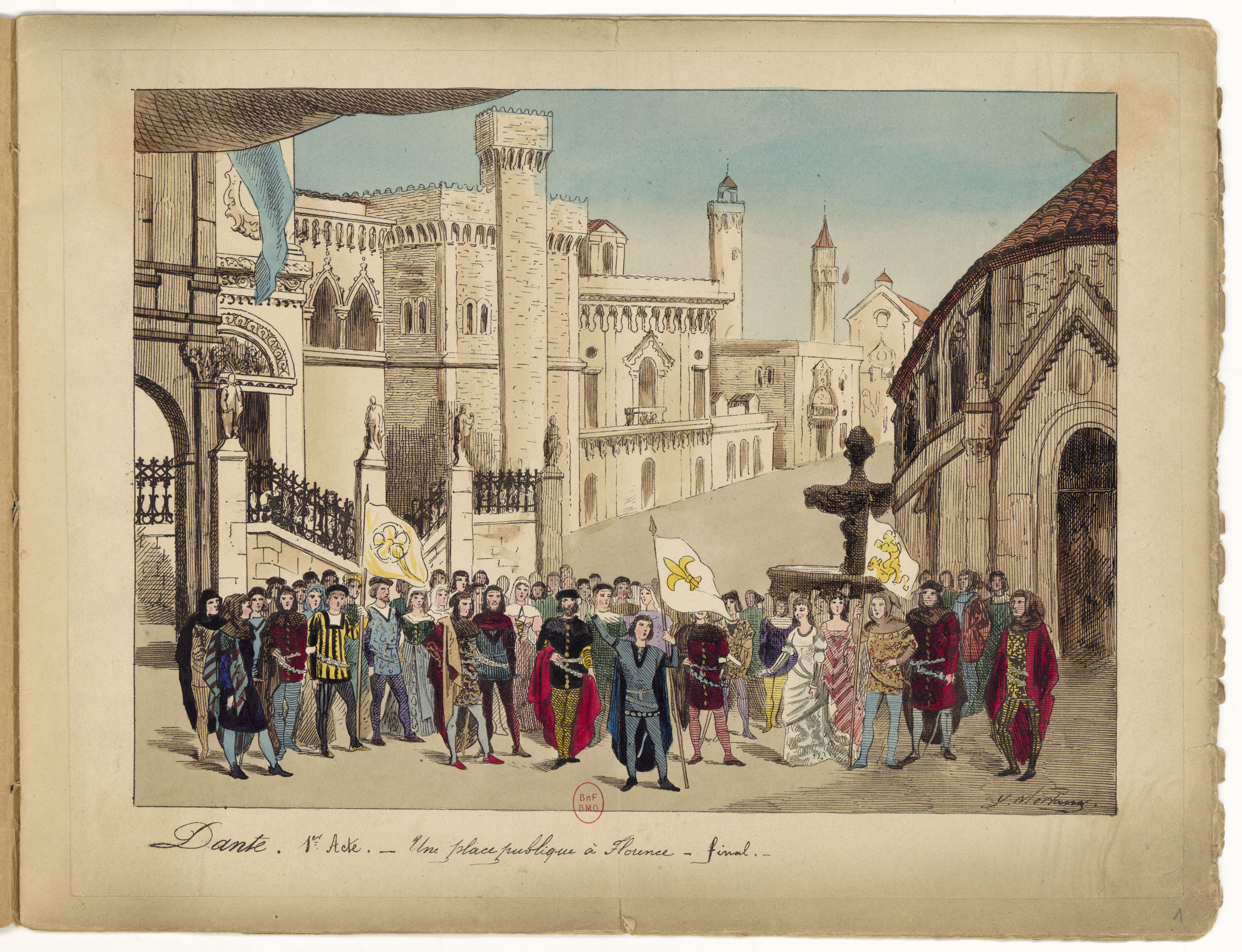
Scene from the first act (1890)

Dante et Béatrice is an 1890 opera in four acts by Benjamin Godard to a libretto by Édouard Blau which premièred at the Opéra-Comique, Théâtre de la Ville, May 13 Paris. In Godard's opera Dante is not as a famous poet, but a young man implicated in political and love intrigues in his quest for Beatrice.

Following a concert performance in Munich in 2016, the work was revived on stage at the Grand Théâtre Massenet, Saint-Étienne in March 2019 with Sophie Marin-Degor as Béatrice and Paul Gaugler as Dante, conducted by Mihhail Gerts.
