= Demetrius (play) =

Incomplete drama by Friedrich Schiller

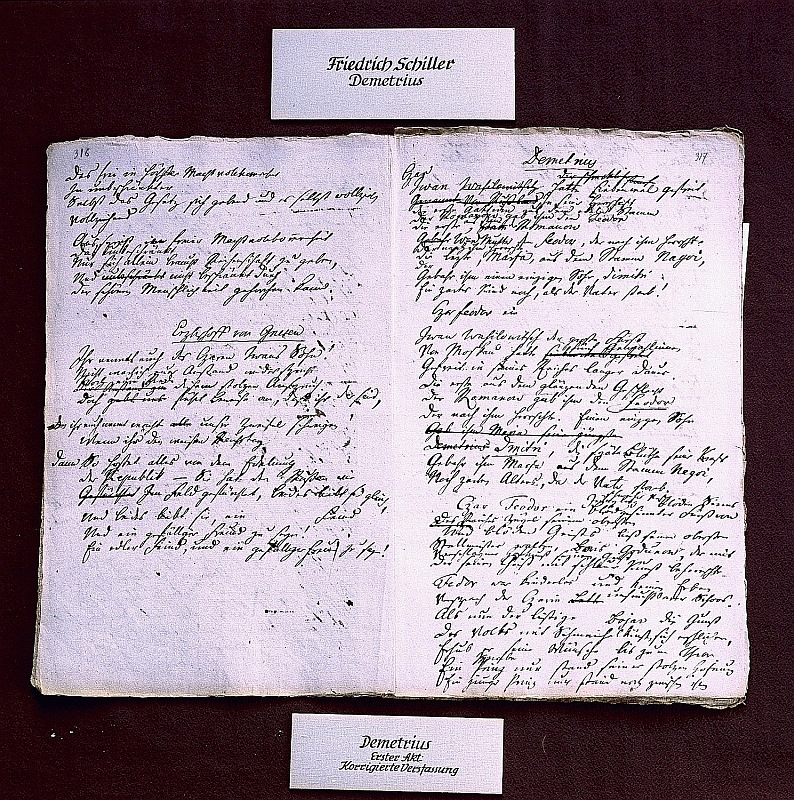
- Two handwritten pages from act 1
- Original language: German
- Written by: Friedrich Schiller
- Genre: Historical drama

Premiere
- Date: 15 February 1875
- Place: Hoftheater in Weimar

Demetrius (German pronunciation: [deˈmeːtʁiʊs]) is an incomplete drama by the German playwright Friedrich Schiller based on the life of Demetrius, briefly Russian czar between 1604 and 1605. It is a reflection on the individual's responsibility in history and on the rule of Napoleon. Schiller worked on the play from 1804 to 1805, but it was left unfinished on his death and was only premiered on 15 February 1857 at the Hoftheater in Weimar.

== Dramatis personae ==
- Sigismund, King of Poland
- Archbishop of Gniezno, Primus of the Empire
- Prince Leo Sapieha
- Demetrius, false son of Czar Ivan
- Mnischek, Prince of Sendomir
- Marina, Mnischek's daughter
- Marfa, widow of Czar Ivan

== Plot ==
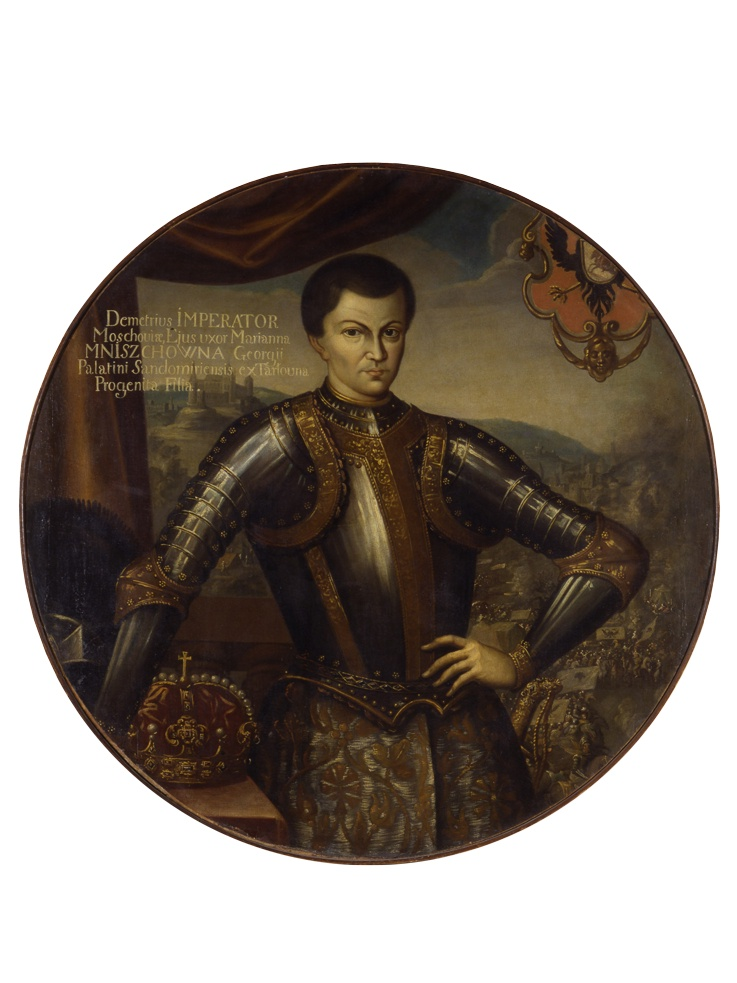
Official portrait of False Dmitry I, early 17th century

In a speech before the Polish diet, Demetrius asserts his claim to the throne of the czars. He hopes for assistance from Poland. He declares that he is the son of Ivan the Terrible and was not, as reputed, murdered in 1591 as a child, but raised in a cloister and that he afterward was in the service of the Prince of Sendomir. He asserts that he is Czar Demetrius. His impressive speech convinces both the diet and the king. Although a formal resolution is not passed by the diet because of a veto by Prince Sapiehas, Poland goes into battle against Moscow. The Poles desire to oust Boris Godunov with the help of the upstart Demetrius. The forceful spirit behind the attempt is Demetrius' fiancée Marina, Mnischek's daughter, and Czar Ivan's widow. The latter has been banned to a cloister by Godunov and has for years been grieving for her allegedly murdered son when she receives the news that Demetrius is alive, after all.

Schiller only indicated the course of the further action. Boris hears about the successes of Demetrius and commits suicide with poison. The new czar is a benevolent ruler until he discovers that his claim to the throne is not legitimate. He is not Ivan's son, but was merely used as a tool by the faction of Godunov opponents. When his mother Marfa is supposed to provide identification, she does not recognize him. Despite the lacking legitimation, Demetrius requests her to recognize him as her son. But Marfa follows her conscience and refuses.

== Schiller's work on Demetrius ==
According to his diary, his efforts can be divided into four phases:

First phase, 10 March to 21 April 1804: Schiller makes a note of the cast of Demetrius and his plans for developing the roles of Marfa and Marina.

Second phase, 22 May to 22 July 1804: Schiller collects information on the historical context of the play and continues to work on the exposition of the drama. An originally planned Sambor act was later rejected and replaced with the scene at the diet. On 22 July 1804, Schiller interrupted his work on Demetrius to begin writing The Princess of Zelle. Also because of illness he only continued working on Demetrius in mid-November 1804.

Third phase, Mid-November to 10 December 1804: Schiller debates whether to work on the “Demetrius drama” or “Warbeck” and decides in favor of the former. Before that time he had, off and on, worked on both dramatic fragments. He settled on a precise arrangement of scenes for Demetrius.

Fourth phase, 20 January to 1 May 1805: Schiller completes the first act. There are only rough outlines for the further course of the drama.
