= Armand Silvestre =

French poet (1837–1901)

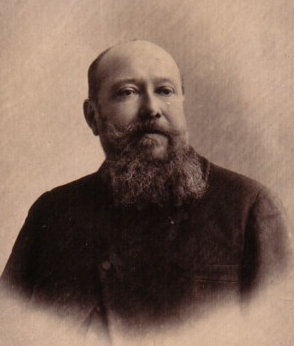
- Born: 18 April 1837; Paris
- Died: 19 February 1901 (aged 63); Toulouse
- Occupations: Choreographer; Poet; Librettist

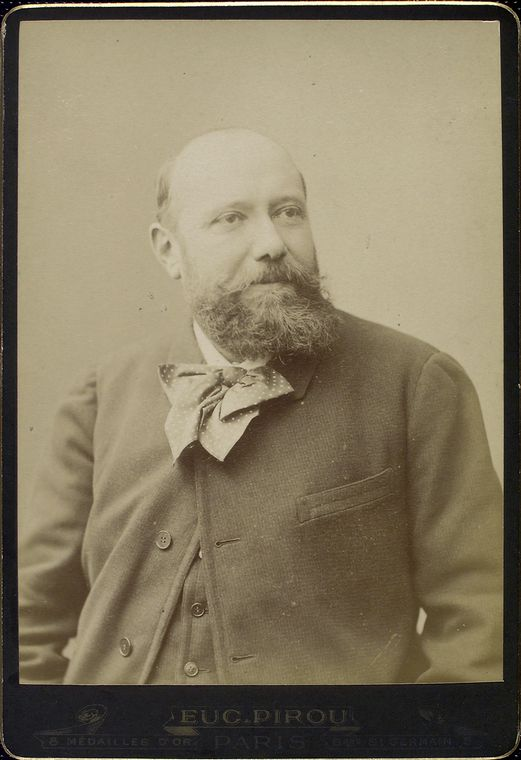
Silvestre at the peak of his career

Paul Armand Silvestre (18 April 1837 – 19 February 1901) was a 19th-century French poet and conteur born in Paris.

He studied at the École polytechnique with the intention of entering the army, but in 1870, he entered the department of finance. Silvestre had a successful civil service career, was decorated with the Legion of Honour in 1886, and in 1892 was made inspector of fine arts. Armand Silvestre made his entry into literature as a poet and was reckoned among the Parnassians.

== Works ==
Silvestre's works were published mainly by Alphonse Lemerre and Gervais Charpentier.

Some of his poems were set to music by Gabriel Fauré, under the form of mélodies for voice and piano, including Le Secret and L'Automne. Thirteen of his poems were set by André Messager. His Jours Passés was set by Léo Delibes under the title Regrets. Jeanne Rivet used Silvestre's text for her song "Notre Amour".

=== Poetry ===
- Rimes neuves et vieilles, with a preface by George Sand (1866); see on Gallica
- Les Renaissances (1870)
- La Gloire du souvenir, poème d'amour (1872)
- Poésies, 1866–1874. Les Amours. La Vie. L'Amour (1875)
- La Chanson des heures, poésies nouvelles (1874–1878) (1878)
- Le Pays des roses, poésies nouvelles, 1880–1882 (1882)
- Le Chemin des étoiles : les Adorations, la Chanson des jours, Musiques d'amour, Dernières tendresses, Poèmes dialogués, 1882–1885 (1885)
- Le Dessus du panier : Impressions et souvenirs, Soleils toulousains, Propos de saison, Au pays des rêves (1885)
- Poésies, 1872–1878. La Chanson des heures (1887)
- Les Ailes d'or, poésies nouvelles (1890)
- Roses d'octobre, poésies, 1884–1889 (1890)
- Poésies, 1866–1872. Rimes neuves et vieilles. Les Renaissances. La Gloire du souvenir (1892)
- L'Or des couchants, poésies nouvelles, 1889–1892 (1892)
- Trente Sonnets pour Mademoiselle Bartet (1896)
- Les Aurores lointaines, poésies nouvelles, 1892–1895 (1896)
- Les Tendresses, poésies nouvelles, 1895–1898 (1898)
- Les Fleurs d'hiver, poésies nouvelles, 1898–1900 (1900)

His volumes of verse include:

- Rimes neuves et vieilles (1866), to which George Sand wrote a preface
- Les Renaissances (1870)
- La Chanson des heures (1878)
- Le Chemin des étoiles (1885)

The poet was also a contributor to Gil Blas and other Parisian journals, distinguishing himself by the licence he permitted himself. To these "absences" from poetry, as Henri Chantavoine calls them, belong the seven volumes of La Vie pour rire (1881–1883), Contes pantagruéliques et galants (1884), Le Livre des joyeusetés (1884), and Gauloiseries nouvelles (1888).

=== Prose ===
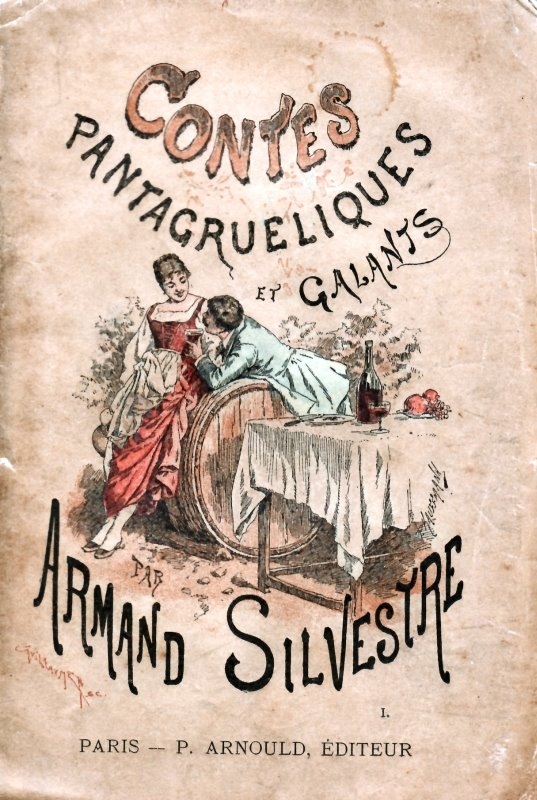
« Contes pantagruéliques et galants » (1884)

- Les Farces de mon ami Jacques (1881)
- Les Mémoires d'un galopin, suivis de Petite Histoire naturelle (1882)
- Le Péché d'Ève (1882)
- Le Filleul du docteur Trousse-Cadet, suivi des Nouveaux Malheurs du commandant Laripète (1882); see on Gallica
- Histoires belles et honnestes (1883); see on Gallica
- Madame Dandin et mademoiselle Phryné (1883)
- Contes grassouillets (1883)
- Les Mélancolies d'un joyeux (1883); see on Gallica
- Chroniques du temps passé. Le Conte de l'archer (1883)
- Pour faire rire. Gauloiseries contemporaines (1883)
- Contes pantagruéliques et galants (1884)
- En pleine fantaisie (1884)
- Les Bêtises de mon oncle (1884)
- Le Livre des joyeusetés (1884)
- Histoires de l'autre monde : mœurs américaines (1884)
- Le Falot (1884)
- Contes à la comtesse (1885)
- Les Merveilleux Récits de l'amiral Le Kelpudubec (1885)
- Joyeusetés galantes, suivies de Laripète citadin (1885)
- Les Cas difficiles (1886); see on Gallica
- Contes de derrière les fagots (1886) illustrated by Félix Lacaille
- Les Veillées de Saint-Pantaléon (1886)
- Histoires inconvenantes (1887)
- Le Livre des fantaisies. Joyeusetés et mélancolies (1887)
- Au fil du rire (1888)
- Histoires joyeuses (1888); see on Gallica
- Fabliaux gaillards (1888); see on Gallica
- Joyeux devis (1888)
- Maïma (1888); see on Gallica
- Gauloiseries nouvelles (1888); see on Gallica
- Propos grivois (1888); see on Gallica
- Rose de mai, roman (1888); see on Gallica
- Le Nu au Salon (5 volumes, 1888-1892)
- Contes à la brune (1889); see on Gallica
- Histoires scandaleuses (1889)
- Un premier amant (1889); see on Gallica
- Livre d'amour (1890); see on Gallica
- Les Facéties de Cadet-Bitard (1890)
- Qui lira rira (1890); see on Gallica
- Trente bonnes farces (1890)
- Le Célèbre Cadet-Bitard (1891); see on Gallica
- Les Malheurs du commandant Laripète, suivis de : Les Mariages de Jacques (1891)
- L'Épouvantail des rosières (1891); see on Gallica
- Contes salés (1891)
- Histoires joviales (1891)
- L'Effroi des bégueules (1891); see on Gallica
- Floréal (1891)
- Portraits et souvenirs, 1886–1891 (1891)
- Histoires extravagantes (1892)
- Pour les amants (1892)
- Au pays des souvenirs : mes maîtres et mes maîtresses (1892)
- Aventures grassouillettes (1892)
- Contes audacieux (1892); see on Gallica
- Contes divertissants (1892)
- Nouveaux contes incongrus (1892)
- La Russie, impressions, portraits, paysages (1892)
- Contes hilarants (1893)
- Histoires réjouissantes (1893)
- Amours folâtres (1893)
- Facéties galantes, contes joyeux (1893)
- Histoires abracadabrantes (1893)
- Contes désopilants (1893)
- Procès Rousseil-Tessandier et biographie de Mlle Rousseil (1893)
- La Semaine pour rire (152 fascicules, 1893–1896)
- La Kosake (1894)
- Fantaisies galantes (1894)
- Veillées joviales (1894)
- Fariboles amusantes (1895)
- Histoires gaies (1895)
- Nouvelles gaudrioles (1895); see on Gallica
- Le Passe-temps des farceurs (1895)
- La Plante enchantée (1895)
- Contes au gros sel (1896)
- Contes irrévérencieux (1896); see on Gallica
- Récits de belle humeur (1896); see on Gallica
- Les Veillées galantes (1896)
- La Semaine joyeuse, (85 fascicules, 1896–1898)
- Contes tragiques et sentimentaux (1897)
- Le Petit art d'aimer, en quatorze chapitres (1897)
- Histoires gauloises (1898)
- Belles histoires d'amour (1898)
- Les Fleurs amoureuses (1899)
- Arlette, roman (1900)
- Guide Armand Silvestre, de Paris et de ses environs et de l'Exposition de 1900 (1900)
- La Chemise à travers les âges, album (1900)
- Images de femmes (1901)
- Orfa, roman (1901)
- Les Sept Péchés capitaux. La luxure (1901); see on Gallica
- Les Dessous de la femme à travers les âges, album (1902)
- Contes incongrus (1902)
- Bibliothèque des Aventures gauloises (1902)

=== Theatre and librettos ===
- 1876: Dimitri, opera in 5 acts and 7 tableaux, with Henri de Bornier, music by Victorin de Joncières, Paris, théâtre National-Lyrique, 1 May
- 1879: Monsieur ? three-act comédie-bouffe, with Paul Burani, Athénée-Comique, 24 October
- 1879: Myrrha, saynète romaine, Paris, Cercle des arts libéraux, 20 December
- 1880: La Tempête, poème symphonique in 3 parts, after Shakespeare, with Pierre Berton, music by Alphonse Duvernoy, Théâtre du Châtelet, 18 November
- 1882: Coquelicot, three-act opéra comique, after the Cogniard brothers, music by Louis Varney, Théâtre des Bouffes-Parisiens, 2 March
- 1882: Galante aventure, three-act opéra comique, with Louis Davyl, music by Ernest Guiraud, Opéra-Comique, 23 March
- 1883: Henry VIII, opera in 4 acts and 6 tableaux, with Léonce Détroyat, music by Camille Saint-Saëns, Opéra, 5 March
- 1884: Pedro de Zalamea, four-act opera, with Léonce Détroyat, music by Benjamin Godard, Anvers, théâtre Royal, 31 January
- 1886: Les Templiers, opera in 5 acts and 7 tableaux, with Jules Adenis and Lionel Bonnemère, music by Henry Litolff, Bruxelles, Théâtre de la Monnaie, 25 January
- 1886: Le Mari d'un jour, three-act opéra comique, with Adolphe d'Ennery, music by Arthur Coquard, Opéra-Comique, 4 February
- 1887: La Tesi, four-act drama, with Georges Maillard, Bruxelles, Théâtre Molière, 29 October; directed by Paul Alhaiza (source: journal le globe illustré)
- 1888: Jocelyn, four-act opera, after the poem by Lamartine, with Victor Capoul, music by Benjamin Godard, Bruxelles, Théâtre de la Monnaie, February
- 1888: Chassé-croisé d'amour, one-act opéra-bouffe, with Édouard Cavailhon, music by Villebichot
- 1888: La Femme bookmaker, one-act opérette, with Édouard Cavailhon; music by Germain Laurens
- 1889: Sapho, February
- 1890: Le Pilote, opera in 3 acts and 4 tableaux, with A. Gandrey, music by J. Urich, Monte-Carlo, Casino, 29 March
- 1893: c, drama in 1 act and in verse, Comédie-Française, 6 March
- 1893: Les Drames sacrés, poème dramatique in 1 prologue and 10 tableaux, in verse, religious pictures after 14th- and 15th-century Italian painters, with music by Gounod with Eugène Morand, Théâtre du Vaudeville, 15 March
- 1894: Izeyl, drame en 4 actes, avec Eugène Morand, musique de Gabriel Pierné, Paris, Théâtre de la Renaissance, 24 January
- 1894: La Fée du rocher, ballet-pantomime en 2 actes et 6 tableaux, avec Francis Thomé et Jules Chéret, 1894
- 1895: Salomé, pantomime lyrique, with Meltzer, music by Gabriel Pierné, Théâtre de l'Athénée, 4 March
- 1897: Tristan de Léonois, drama in 3 acts and 7 tableaux, including 1 prologue, in verse, Comédie-Française, 28 October
- 1897: Chemin de croix, twelve religious poems after Armand Silvestre, set in music by Alexandre Georges
- 1899: Messaline, drame lyrique in 4 acts and 5 tableaux, with Eugène Morand, music by Isidore de Lara
- 1901: Charlotte Corday, drame musical in 3 acts, Opéra Populaire, February
- 1901: Grisélidis, conte lyrique in 3 acts and 1 prologue, with Eugène Morand, after the le mystery presented at the Comédie-Française, music by Jules Massenet, Opéra-Comique, 13 November
- 1908: Le Chevalier d'Éon, four-act opéra comique, with Henri Cain, music by Rodolphe Berger, Théâtre de la Porte-Saint-Martin, 10 April
- Le Chevalier aux fleurs, ballet-pantomime in 12 tableaux, music by André Messager and Raoul Pugno (s. d.)

An account of his varied and somewhat incongruous production is hardly complete without mention of his art criticism. Le Nu au Salon (1888–1892), in five volumes, with numerous illustrations, was followed by other volumes of the same type. He died at Toulouse, February 19, 1901.
