= Eugène Crosti =

French opera singer (1833–1908)

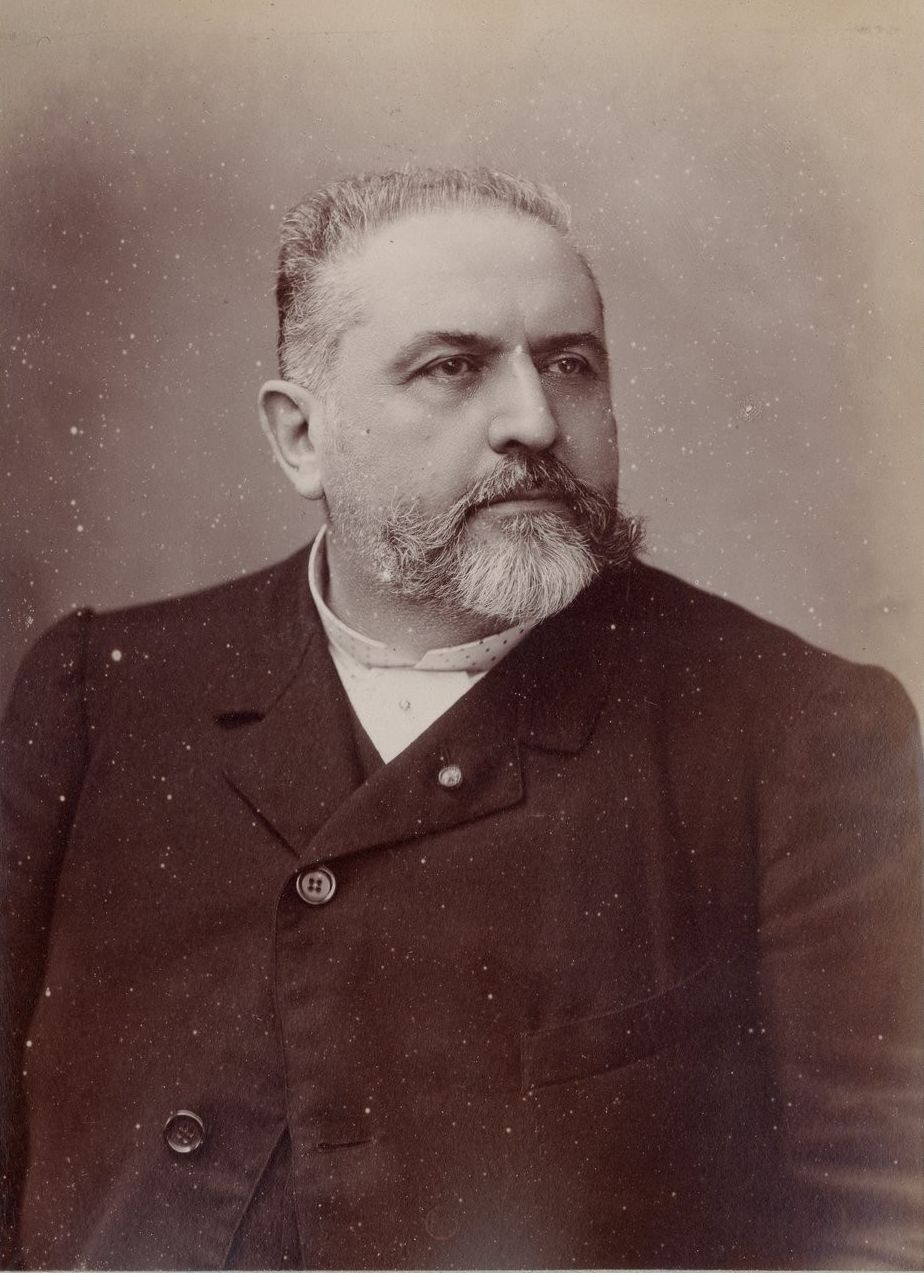
- Eugène Crosti by Nadar
- Born: 21 October 1833; Paris, France
- Died: 30 December 1908 (aged 75); Paris
- Education: Conservatoire de Paris
- Occupations: Opera singer; Baritone; Music educator
- Organizations: Opéra comique
- Awards: Ordre des Arts et des Lettres; Chevalier of the Légion d'honneur; Silver medal at the Exposition Universelle (1900)

Eugène, Charles, Antoine Crosti (21 October 1833 – 30 December 1908) was a 19th-century French baritone and singing teacher.

== Biography ==
=== Training ===
Born in Paris, Crosti was a student at the Conservatoire de Paris (Note: then called "Conservatoire national de musique et de déclamation") where he won the First prize at the singing competition in 1857.

=== Opéra-Comique (1857–1866) ===
He was introduced to the audience for the first time at the Opéra-Comique in La Gioconda.

He sang the role of the chambellan in La Fiancée by Auber in February 1858 and Les Sabots de la Marquise by Ernest Boulanger, in March 1858. He created the role of Chapelle in Chapelle et Bachaumont, 1 act comic opera, libretto by Armand Barthet, music by Jules Cressonois, on 18 June 1858.

=== Conservatoire national de musique et de déclamation (1876–1903) ===
After creating the highly acclaimed characters of certain operas, he was appointed singing teacher in October 1876, at the Conservatoire de musique et de déclamation (1836), where he had Léon Escalaïs and Maria Lureau among other students. He wrote didactic works and translates arias and operas, among others Italian: Pagliacci, La Bohème, La Martyre, Zazà, Chatterton...

A member of the Higher Council of Education, he ceased his tenure in 1903 and continued to give private lessons, singing and scenery lessons.

== Theories of voice and singing ==
For Crosti, there is not only the chest voice and head voice; there is a kind of intermediate emission that he calls palatal voice, and that is a slight modification of the breast voice. The palatal voice is produced at the glottis level following the same mechanism as the chest voice itself (vibrating strings in all their length), but it differs from the latter in that the resonance, instead of being made above all in the thorax, is supported under the palatal vault by an appropriate arrangement of the pharynx, the soft palate. The vocal breath, sent to the frontal sinuses and striking directly at the upper walls of the palate, contracts the roundness, majesty and softness to which the nasal cavities it passes, without vibrating them, however, add sound still. It is also in this register that the richest sounds of an organ occur. It is therefore necessary to take care of the production, because it is also the medium, part of the voice in which the songs to be sung are usually written.

Do not breathe by lifting your shoulders, besides that it is painful to carry out, it is very unpleasant, to see, and moreover this means, not fast, does not allow you to breathe fully and take the full dose of air that constitutes a complete breathing. Breathe from the chest as if you were lying on your back. Lie down on a bed and study what work is done when you breathe. You'll see that your shoulders don't move, only your chest is working. Well, once you're standing, make sure you get used to taking your breath as you used to take it the moment before, when you were lying on your back. It will be very important to get used to breathing through the nose without opening your mouth. In this way, in addition to taking as much air as opening your mouth, you have the advantage of not drying out your throat. When you have acquired this habit, which is not difficult to acquire by any means, you will study yourself to keep, in your chest, as deeply as possible, the breathing that you will have taken, and this, by forcing your thorax by a slight effort, a light pressure, to remain dilated, position that it will have to keep, as much as possible, as long as you sing, so that your chest, which is your body of harmony, will always be in its most beautiful position. So take a deep breath (as you always have to do, we would have only one word to say) and press constantly, but lightly on your breathing, first to prevent it from rising too early, and then to be able to spend it only with the greatest parsimony and then to force your chest to remain dilated and offer the sound the largest possible center of development. I would add that this way of breathing will allow you to take a quick and generous breath.

(Eugène Crosti. Le gradus du chanteur, 1893).

== Teaching materials ==
- 1878: Abrégé de l'art du chant
- 1878: Six exercices vocaux
- 1880: La voix des enfants
- 1893: Le gradus du chanteur
- 1894: Première années de chant
- 1896: Précis de prononciation
- 1896: Le gradus du chanteur, méthode de chant conçue sur un plan nouveau (No 1, pour basse ou contralto) available at Gallica
- 1896: Le gradus du chanteur, méthode de chant conçue sur un plan nouveau (No 3, pour ténor ou soprano) available at Gallica

== Translation ==
- Leoncavallo, Ruggero (1894). Paillasse, drama in 2 acts; French lyrics by Eugène Crosti (in French). Milan: E. Sonzogno.
