= 1710 in music =

List of years in music	(table)
- … 1700; 1701; 1702; 1703; 1704; 1705; 1706; 1707; 1708; 1709; 1710; 1711; 1712; 1713; 1714; 1715; 1716; 1717; 1718; 1719; 1720 …
- Art; Archaeology; Architecture; Literature; Music; Philosophy; Science; +...

The year 1710 in music involved some significant musical events and new works.

== Events ==
- April 18 – Probable date of the première of Johann Sebastian Bach's St Mark Passion pastiche at the chapel of Wilhelmsburg Castle (two movements by Bach).
- In Britain, the Academy of Vocal Music is founded by Johann Christoph Pepusch and others.

== Published popular music ==
- Collier, John Payne (ed.). A Book of Roxburghe Ballads (containing 1,341 broadside ballads, including "Fare Thee Well")

== Classical music ==
- Louis-Nicolas Clérambault
  - Cantates françoises, Book 1
  - Premier livre d'orgue contenant deux suites
- Georg Frideric Handel – incidental music for The Alchemist
- Michel de la Barre – Pièces pour la flûte traversière, Livre 1
- Jean Baptiste Loeillet of Ghent – 12 Recorder Sonatas, Op. 1
- Johann Pachelbel – Magnificat Fugue, P.268
- James Paisible – The Royall Galliarde. Mr. Isaac's new dance, made for Her Majesty's Birth Day, 1710...
- Johann Christoph Pepusch – 6 English Cantatas, Book 1
- Johann Schenk – L'écho du Danube, Op .9
- Johann Christian Schickhardt
  - 7 Recorder Sonatas, Op. 1
  - 6 Oboe Sonatas, Op. 8
  - 6 Sonatas à 4, Op. 14
- Jean Baptiste Senaillé – 10 Violin Sonatas, Op. 1
- Giuseppe Valentini – Concerto a Quattro Violini (12 concerti grossi), Op. 7 (Rome)

== Opera ==
- Floriano Arresti – L'enigma disciolta
- Antonio Maria Bononcini – Tigrane, re d'Armenia
- André Campra – Les Fêtes vénitiennes
- Pietro Paolo Laurenti – Sabella mrosa d'Truvlin
- Johann Mattheson – Boris Goudenow

== Births ==
- January 4 – Giovanni Battista Pergolesi, composer, violinist and organist (died 1736)
- March 12 – Thomas Arne, composer (died 1778)
- March 27 – Joseph Abaco, violoncellist and composer (died 1805)
- April 12 – Caffarelli, castrato singer (died 1783)
- August 12 - Ferdinand Rudolph Fränzl, German trumpeter and viola player (died 1782)
- November 22 – Wilhelm Friedemann Bach, composer, eldest son of Johann Sebastian Bach (died 1784)
- date unknown
  - James Oswald, composer and music publisher (died 1769)
  - Giovanni Battista Ferrandini, composer (died 1791)
  - Thomas Gladwin, organist and composer (died 1799)
  - Anton Joseph Hampel, horn player (died 1771)
  - George Alexander Stevens, actor, poet and songwriter (died 1780)

== Deaths ==
- May 10 – Georg Dietrich Leyding, organist and composer (born 1664)
- June 14 – Johann Friedrich Alberti, German composer and organist (born 1642)
- July 8 – Juan García de Salazar, choral composer (b. 1639)
- September 26 – Cardinal Vincenzo Grimani, opera librettist
- November 22 – Bernardo Pasquini, composer (born 1637)
- date unknown
  - Charles Mouton, composer and lutenist (born c. 1626)
  - Gaspar Sanz, priest and composer (born 1640)
- probable
  - Rosa Giacinta Badalla, Benedictine nun and composer (born c.1660)
  - Marcus Meibomius, historian of music (born c. 1630)
  - Camilla de Rossi, composer
