= 1711 in music =

List of years in music	(table)
- … 1701; 1702; 1703; 1704; 1705; 1706; 1707; 1708; 1709; 1710; 1711; 1712; 1713; 1714; 1715; 1716; 1717; 1718; 1719; 1720; 1721 …
- Art; Archaeology; Architecture; Literature; Music; Philosophy; Science; +...

The year 1711 in music involved some significant events.

== Events ==
- February 24 – The London premiere of Rinaldo by George Frideric Handel, the first Italian opera written for the London stage, at the Queen's Theatre, Haymarket. This is the first of at least 25 operas by Handel that will appear by 1739. John Walsh becomes Handel's regular printer beginning with the publication of Rinaldo.
- April 3 – Possible premiere of Johann Sebastian Bach's St Mark Passion pastiche at the chapel of Wilhelmsburg Castle (two movements by Bach).
- Invention of the tuning fork by John Shore.

== Classical music ==
- William Babell – Toccata No.6
- Giovanni Maria Bononcini – Idol mio, bel tesoro
- Louis-Antoine Dornel – 8 Violin Sonatas and 4 Flute Suites, Op. 2
- Sebastián Durón – Veneno es de Amor la envidia
- Christoph Graupner
  - Furcht und Zagen, GWV 1102/11b
  - Angenehmes Wasserbad, GWV 1104/11c
  - Reiner Geist lass doch mein Herz, GWV 1138/11
  - Ach Gott wie manches Herzeleid, GWV 1142/11
  - Angst und Jammer, GWV 1145/11
- George Frideric Handel
  - Siete rose rugiadose, HWV 162
  - Splenda l'alba in oriente, HWV 166
  - Oboe Sonata in F major, HWV 363a
  - Sonata for oboe in C minor, HWV 366
- Elisabeth Jacquet de la Guerre – Cantates françaises sur des sujets tirés de l’écriture, Livre II
- Barbara Kluntz – Choral Music Buch
- Leo Leonardo – Splende più dell'usato
- Francesco Manfredini – Concerto for 2 Trumpets in D Major
- Marin Marais – Pièces de Viole, Book 3
- Michele Mascitti – 14 Sonatas, Op. 4
- Alessandro Scarlatti – Miserere
- Jean-Baptiste Stuck – Les Bains de Tomery
- Joseph Valette de Montigny – Motets I
- Francesco Mario Veracini – Concerto for eight instruments in D major
- Antonio Vivaldi – L'Estro armonico (Op. 3), published in Amsterdam

== Opera ==
- Sebastián Durón – Las nuevas armas de amor
- Johann Friedrich Fasch – Clomire
- George Frideric Handel – Rinaldo
- Reinhard Keiser – Croesus
- Nicola Porpora – Flavio Anicio Olibrio

== Births ==
- January 12 – Gaetano Latilla, opera composer (died 1788)
- January 29 – Giuseppe Bonno, composer (died 1788)
- April 22 – Paul II Anton, Prince Esterházy, patron of music (died 1762)
- June 23 – Giovanni Battista Guadagnini, luthier (died 1786)
- July 26 – Lorenz Christoph Mizler, writer on music (died 1778)
- September 11 – William Boyce, composer (died 1779)
- September 18 – Ignaz Holzbauer, composer (died 1783)
- December 25 – Jean-Joseph de Mondonville, violinist and composer (died 1772)
- date unknown
  - Davide Perez, opera composer (died 1778)
  - John Francis Wade, hymnist (died 1786)
- probable – Panna Cinka, violinist (died 1772)

== Deaths ==
- January 6 – Quirino Colombani, musician, composer and music teacher, died in hunting accident (born c. 1668)
- March 19 – Thomas Ken, hymn-writer (born 1637)
- September 3 – Élisabeth Sophie Chéron, artist and musician (born 1648)
- September 27 – Christian Geist, organist and composer (born c. 1650)
- November 3 – Ferdinand Tobias Richter, organist and composer (born 1651)
- December 18 – Louis de Deyster, artist and maker of musical instruments (born 1656)
- December 25 – Johann Nikolaus Hanff, organist and composer (born 1663)
- probable – Joannes Florentius a Kempis, Dutch composer (born 1635)
