= 1709 in music =

List of years in music	(table)
- … 1699; 1700; 1701; 1702; 1703; 1704; 1705; 1706; 1707; 1708; 1709; 1710; 1711; 1712; 1713; 1714; 1715; 1716; 1717; 1718; 1719 …
- Art; Archaeology; Architecture; Literature; Music; Philosophy; Science; +...

The year 1709 in music involved some significant events.

== Events ==
- Johann Georg Pisendel leaves his post in the court orchestra of Ansbach to travel to Leipzig, meeting Johann Sebastian Bach en route.
- Antonio Stradivari makes the Viotti Stradivarius.

== Published popular music ==
- "Marlbrough s'en va-t-en guerre"

== Classical music ==
- William Babell – The Third Book of the Ladys Entertainment
- Johann Sebastian Bach
  - Alla breve in D major, BWV 589
  - Prelude and Fugue in A minor, BWV 895
  - Fugue in A major on a Theme by Tomaso Albinoni, BWV 950 (approximate date)
- Giovanni Battista Bassani – Acroama missale
- Antonio Maria Bononcini – La decollazione di S. Giovanni Batista
- Juan Cabanilles – Flores de Música
- Antonio Caldara – Il nome più glorioso
- Louis-Antoine Dornel – Livre de simphonies contenant six suites en trio avec une sonate en quatuor, Op. 1
- Francesco Nicola Fago – Il Faraone Sommerso
- Francesco Gasparini – L'Oracolo del Fato
- Christoph Graupner
  - Die Krankheit so mich drückt, GWV 1155/09b
  - Siehe selig ist der Mensch, GWV 1162/09
  - Diese Zeit ist ein Spiel der Eitelkeit, GWV 1165/09
  - (see List of cantatas by Christoph Graupner)
- George Frideric Handel
  - Irene, idolo mio, HWV 120b
  - Lungi da me, pensier tiranno, HWV 125b
  - Lungi da voi, che siete poli, HWV 126c
  - Mi palpita il cor, HWV 132
  - Pensieri notturni di Filli, HWV 134
  - Solitudini care, amata libertà, HWV 163
- Francesco Onofrio Manfredini – 12 Sinfonie da chiesa, Op.2
- Michel Montéclair – Cantata: La Mort de Didon
- Jacques Morel – Pièces de violle, Livre 1
- James Paisible - The Royal Portuguez. Mr. Isaac's new dance made for Her Majesty's Birthday 1709...
- Johann Christoph Pepusch – 6 Recorder Sonatas, Op.2a
- Giovanni Battista Reali – 10 Trio Sonatas, Op.1
- Agostino Steffani – Amor vien dal destino (Il turno)
- Giuseppe Torelli – Concerti Grossi, Op. 8: no 6 in G minor "Christmas Concerto", published posthumously
- Antonio Vivaldi – 12 Violin Sonatas, Op.2
- Jan Dismas Zelenka – Immisit Dominus pestilentiam, ZWV 58

== Opera ==
- Emanuele d'Astorga – Dafne
- Michele Falco – Lo Lollo pisciaportelle
- George Frideric Handel – Agrippina HWV 6
- Marin Marais – Sémélé
- Giuseppe Maria Orlandini – L'odio e l'amore
- Agostino Steffani – Tassilone

== Births ==
- January 1 – Johann Heinrich Hartmann Bätz, organ builder (died 1770)
- January 24 – Dom Bédos de Celles, Benedictine monk and pipe organ builder (died 1779)
- February 16 (baptised) – Charles Avison, composer and organist (died 1770)
- March 27 – William Flackton, viola player and composer (died 1798)
- April 14 – Charles Collé, songwriter and dramatist (died 1783)
- June 25 – Francesco Araja, composer (died 1762–1770)
- August 8 – Hermann Anton Gelinek, monk and musician (died 1779)
- October 25 – Georg Gebel (the younger), composer (died 1753)
- November 22 – Franz Benda, violinist and composer (died 1786)
- December 1 – František Xaver Richter, composer (died 1789)
- date unknown – Christoph Schaffrath, composer (died 1763)
- probable – Richard Charke, violinist, composer, operatic baritone, and playwright (died c. 1738)

== Deaths ==
- February 8 – Giuseppe Torelli, violinist and composer (born 1658)
- July 17 – Pascal Collasse, composer (baptized 1649)
- date unknown
  - Cristofaro Caresana, operatic tenor, organist and composer (born c.1640)
  - Giovanni Grancino, luthier (born 1637)
