= 1707 in music =

List of years in music	(table)
- … 1697; 1698; 1699; 1700; 1701; 1702; 1703; 1704; 1705; 1706; 1707; 1708; 1709; 1710; 1711; 1712; 1713; 1714; 1715; 1716; 1717 …
- Art; Archaeology; Architecture; Literature; Music; Philosophy; Science; +...

The year 1707 in music involved some significant events.

== Events ==
- George Frideric Handel meets Domenico Scarlatti in Venice.
- Antonio Caldara leaves his post in Mantua to become maestro di cappella to Prince Ruspoli in Rome.
- Domenico Zipoli becomes a pupil of organist Giovani Maria Casini in Florence.
- October 17 – Johann Sebastian Bach marries his second cousin, Maria Barbara Bach, at Dornheim.
- December 1 – English composer and organist Jeremiah Clarke commits suicide in London. He is succeeded as Master of the Children of the Chapel Royal by William Croft.

== Published classical music ==
- Tomaso Albinoni – 12 Concerti a cinque, Op. 5
- Francesco Antonio Bonporti – 10 Violin Sonatas, Op. 7
- Michel de La Barre – Pièces en trio, Livre 3
- Pierre Gautier – Symphonies divisées par suites de tons
- Elisabeth Jacquet de la Guerre
  - Pièces de clavecin, Livre 2
  - 6 Violin Sonatas
- Michele Mascitti – 12 Violin Sonatas, Op. 3
- Nicolas Siret – Pièces de Clavecin, Livre 1

== Published popular music ==
- Hymns and Spiritual Songs by Isaac Watts (including "When I Survey the Wondrous Cross")

== Classical music ==
- Johann Bernhard Bach
  - Helft mir Gottes Güte greifen
  - Jesus nichts als Jesus
- Johann Sebastian Bach
  - Christ lag in Todes Banden, BWV 4 (chorale cantata)
  - Gottes Zeit ist die allerbeste Zeit, BWV 106
  - Fugue (on the theme 'B-A-C-H') in C major, BWV Anh.107
  - Aus der Tiefe rufe ich, Herr, zu dir, BWV 131
  - Der Herr denket an uns, BWV 196
  - Prelude and Fugue in A minor, BWV 551
  - Toccata and Fugue in C major, BWV 566a
  - Fugue in G minor, BWV 578
  - Capriccio in E major, BWV 993
- Michel Richard Delalande – Cantate Domino canticum novum, S. 72
- Henri Desmarets – Confitebor tibi Domine
- Giovanni Battista Draghi – 6 Harpsichord Suites
- George Frideric Handel
  - The Alchemist, HWV 43
  - Il trionfo del Tempo e della Verità, HWV 46
  - Ah, che pur troppo è vero, HWV 77
  - Diana cacciatrice, HWV 79
  - Allor ch'io dissi addio, HWV 80
  - Alpestre monte, HWV 81
  - Aure soavi e liete, HWV 84
  - Care selve, aure grate, HWV 88
  - Clori, degli occhi miei, HWV 91a
  - Clori, mia bella Clori, HWV 92
  - Clori, Tirsi e Fileno, HWV 96
  - Il delirio amoroso, HWV 99
  - Armida abbandonata, HWV 105
  - Agrippina condotta a morire, HWV 110
  - Figli del mesto cor, HWV 112
  - Fra pensieri quel pensiero, HWV 115
  - Ne' tuoi lumi, o bella Clori, HWV 133
  - No se emenderá jamás, HWV 140
  - Non sospirar, non piangere, HWV 141
  - Notte placida e cheta, HWV 142
  - O lucenti, o sereni occhi, HWV 144
  - Occhi miei che faceste?, HWV 146
  - Poichè giuraro amore, HWV 148
  - Qualor l'egre pupille, HWV 152
  - Sarei troppo felice, HWV 157
  - La bianca rosa, HWV 160a
  - Spande ancor a mio dispetto, HWV 165
  - Stanco di più soffrire, HWV 167a
  - Tra le fiamme, HWV 170
  - Un' alma innamorata, HWV 173
  - Un sospir a chi si muore, HWV 174
  - Vedendo amor, HWV 175
  - Venne voglia ad amore, HWV 176
  - Giù nei Tartari Regni, HWV 187
  - Ah! che troppo ineguali, HWV 230
  - Dixit Dominus, HWV 232
  - Laudate pueri Dominum, HWV 237
  - Nisi Dominus, HWV 238
  - Salve Regina, HWV 241
  - Sinfonia in B-flat major, HWV 339
  - Oboe Sonata in B-flat major, HWV 357
  - Trio Sonata in G minor, HWV 391
  - Trio Sonata in F major, HWV 405
  - Keyboard Sonata in G minor, HWV 580
- Reinhard Keiser – Dialogus von der Geburt Christi
- Michel de La Barre – Suite in E minor, IMB 17
- Jean-Baptiste de Lully – Concert donné au soupé du roy
- Johann Pachelbel – Kyrie, Gott Vater in Ewigkeit, P. 233
- James Paisible – The Union. Mr. Isaac's new dance...
- Alessandro Scarlatti
  - Ahi che sarà di me, H. 19
  - Cain, overo Il primo omicidio (oratorio)
  - Il giardino di rose
- Giuseppe Torelli – Sinfonia in D major, G.29

== Opera ==
- Antonia Bembo – Ercole amante, book by Francesco Buti
- Thomas Clayton – Rosamond, book by Joseph Addison, produced in London
- Nicola Fago – Radamisto
- Handel – Rodrigo
- Johann Christoph Pepusch – Thomyris, Queen of Scythia
- Alessandro Scarlatti – Mitridate Eupatore
- Agostino Steffani – Arminio

== Births ==
- April 10 – Michel Corrette, organist and composer (died 1795)
- May 2 – Jean-Baptiste Barrière, cellist and composer (died 1747)
- December 18 – Charles Wesley, hymn-writer (died 1788)
- date unknown
  - Matthew Dubourg, violinist, conductor and composer (died 1767)
  - Zanetta Farussi, opera singer and composer (died 1776)
  - Edward Harwood (of Darwen), composer of hymns, anthems and songs (died 1787)
  - Pietro Domenico Paradisi, composer and harpsichordist (died 1791)
  - Herman Friedrich Voltmar, composer (died 1782)

== Deaths ==
- February 9 – Giuseppe Aldrovandini, composer (born 1665)
- March 30 – Henry Hall, composer of church music (born c. 1656)
- April 20 – Johann Christoph Denner, inventor of the clarinet (born 1655)
- May 9 – Dieterich Buxtehude, composer (born 1637)
- June – Gaspard Le Roux, French harpsichordist (born c.1660)
- August 20 – Nicolas Gigault, organist and composer (born 1627)
- September 5 – Daniel Speer, composer (born 1636)
- December 1 – Jeremiah Clarke, composer (born c.1674)
- date unknown – Julie d'Aubigny ("La Maupin"), opera singer (born 1670)
- probable – Henry Playford, music publisher (born 1657)
