= 1708 in music =

List of years in music	(table)
- … 1698; 1699; 1700; 1701; 1702; 1703; 1704; 1705; 1706; 1707; 1708; 1709; 1710; 1711; 1712; 1713; 1714; 1715; 1716; 1717; 1718 …
- Art; Archaeology; Architecture; Literature; Music; Philosophy; Science; +...

The year 1708 in music involved some significant musical events and new works.

== Events ==
- Alessandro Scarlatti returns to Naples from Venice.
- Johann Sebastian Bach becomes organist and concert-master at the Weimar court.
- Arcangelo Corelli returns to Rome and joins the household of Cardinal Pietro Ottoboni.

== Published popular music ==
- Lyra Davidica (hymns)
- Isaac Watts, Hymns and Spiritual Songs

== Published classical music ==
- Tomaso Albinoni – 6 Sonate da chiesa, T.So 26–31, Op. 4
- Louis de Caix d'Hervelois – Pièces de viole, Livre 1
- Andre Campra – Cantates françoises
- Francisco José de Castro – 8 Concertos, Op. 4
- Evaristo Felice Dall'Abaco – 12 Violin Sonatas, Op. 1
- Pierre Du Mage – Livre d'orgue
- Jean-Baptiste Stuck – Cantates françaises Livre II

== Classical music ==
- Johann Sebastian Bach
  - Gott ist mein König, BWV 71
  - Lobe den Herrn, meine Seele, BWV 143
  - Kyrie in F major, BWV 233a
  - Fantasia and Fugue in C minor, BWV 537
  - Prelude and Fugue in C major, BWV 545a
  - Toccata and Fugue in E major, BWV 566 (Authorship disputed)
  - Fugue on a Theme by Giovanni Legrenzi, BWV 574
  - Fugue in C minor, BWV 575
  - Passacaglia in C minor, BWV 582
  - Heut’ triumphiret Gottes Sohn, BWV 630
  - Fantasia super 'Jesu, meine Freude', BWV 713
  - Suite in A major, BWV 832
  - Praeludium et partita dei tuono terzo, BWV 833
  - Toccata in D minor, BWV 913
  - Fugue in C major, BWV 946
- Antonio Maria Bononcini
  - Mentre in placido sonno
  - La presa di Tebe
  - Tutta fiamme e tutta ardore
- Antonio Caldara – Il martirio di Santa Caterina
- Henri Desmarets – Usque quo Domine
- George Frederic Handel
  - La Resurrezione (The Resurrection) (oratorio)
  - Aci, Galatea e Polifemo, HWV 72
  - Ah, crudel! nel pianto mio, HWV 78
  - Aminta e Filide, HWV 83
  - Cuopre tal volta il cielo, HWV 98
  - Dalla guerra amorosa, HWV 102a
  - Ditemi, o piante, HWV 107
  - Lungi n'andò Fileno, HWV 128
  - Nel dolce tempo, HWV 135b
  - Nell'africane selve, HWV 136
  - Olinto pastore, Tebro fiume, Gloria, HWV 143
  - Quando sperasti, o core, HWV 153
  - Se pari è la tua fè, HWV 158a
  - Sento là che ristretto, HWV 161a
- Jacques-Martin Hotteterre – Pièces pour la flûte traversiere, Op. 2
- Elisabeth Jacquet de la Guerre – Cantates françaises sur des sujets tirés de l’écriture, Livre I
- Benedetto Marcello – 12 Concerti à 5, Op. 1
- Johann Mattheson – 12 Flute Sonatas, Op. 1
- Johann Pachelbel
  - An Wasserflüssen Babylon, P. 18
  - Plauener Orgelbuch
- James Paisible – The Saltarella. Mr. Isaac's new dance made for Her Majesty's Birthday, 1708...
- Bernardo Pasquini – Passagaglie and Variation
- Alessandro Scarlatti – Oratorio per la Passione di Nostro Signore Gesù Cristo
- Georg Philipp Telemann – Singet dem Herrn, TWV 1:1748
- Antonio Vivaldi
  - Cello Concerto in F major, RV 410
  - Concerto in A major, RV 585
  - Sonata for Violin, Oboe, Organ, Chalumeau and Continuo, RV 779

== Opera ==
- Giovanni Bononcini – Mario fuggitivo
- Antonio Caldara – Più bel nome
- André Campra – Hippodamie
- Johann Joseph Fux – Pulcheria, K.303
- George Frideric Handel
  - Daphne
  - Florindo
- Antonio Literes – Acis y Galatea
- Nicola Porpora – L'Agrippina

== Births ==
- January 26 – William Hayes (composer), organist, singer, conductor and composer (died 1777)
- February 8 – Václav Jan Kopřiva, composer (died 1789)
- February 11 – Egidio Duni, composer of opera comique (died 1775)
- February 25 – Felix Benda, composer (died 1768)
- April 6 – Georg Reutter II, composer of church music (died 1772)
- May 5 – Johann Adolf Scheibe, composer and critic (died 1776)
- June 19 – Johann Gottlieb Janitsch, composer (died 1763)
- date unknown
  - Lavinia Fenton, actress, the original Polly Peachum (died 1760)
  - Johann Adolph Scheibe, composer (died 1776)
  - William Tuckey, composer (died 1781)

== Deaths ==
- April 19 – Angiola Teresa Moratori Scanabecchi, composer and painter (born 1662)
- May 13 – Giovanni Battista Draghi, composer and keyboardist (born c.1640)
- September 3 – Christian Liebe, organist and composer (born 1654)
- September 26 - Giovanni Battista Bianchini, composer, organist, and choir conductor (born after 1650)
- October 1 (or January 10) – John Blow, composer (born 1649)
- date unknown
  - Moll Davis, singer (born c. 1648)
  - Johannes Kelpius, mystic and musician (born 1673)
  - Thomas Pereira, musician (born 1645)
  - Bernard Smith, organ maker (born c.1630)
