= Thomas Gladwin =

Thomas Gladwin may refer to:

- Thomas Gladwin (musician) (1710–1799), English composer and musician
- Thomas Gladwin (sheriff) (1629/30–1697), Sheriff of Derbyshire
