= Quirino Colombani =

Italian composer

Quirino Colombani (Correggio, c.1668 - Rome?, 6 January 1711) was an Italian composer, and cellist. He was active in both 17th and 18th centuries.

== Biography ==
Colombani was born in Correggio, but it is not known where he received his first music education. He settled in Rome and studied there with Giovanni Bicilli. His activity has been documented since 1692, when he took part as a violone player in the music for the patronal feast of S. Lorenzo in Damaso sponsored by Cardinal Ottoboni. In the Lent of 1695, he made his debut as a composer with the Latin oratorio Iahelis de Sisara triumphans (libretto by Antonio Checchi), performed in the oratory of the Crocifisso di S. Marcello. In 1696, he was a member of Francesco Maria Ruspoli's household, as we read in the printed libretto of Latin oratorio Moysis nativitas (text by Antonio Checchi). His other oratorios were regularly performed for the same confraternity until 1702.

In March 1696, he was appointed coadjutor of Giovanni Bicilli, the chapel master of S. Maria in Vallicella (the so-called Chiesa Nuova). Some of his oratories were performed at the Vallicella's oratory: La fede trionfante nella caduta di Gerosolima (1702; libretto Pietro T. Vagni); Le glorie della fede promosse da s. Filippo Neri nella compilatione degli Annali Ecclesiastici (1704; libretto Domenico De Martinis); San Lorenzo (1705; libretto Filippo Cristofari).

In 1704, his cantata Il genere umano consolato (text Pompeo Figari) was performed in the Apostolic Palace for Christmas Eve. He composed the music of the cantata L'Apollo (text Massimo Scarabelli), commissioned by the Accademia di S. Luca for the annual festival of painting, sculpture and architecture, celebrated in Campidoglio on May 6, 1706. The cantata was performed by the soprano Francesco Besci, nicknamed Paoluccio, accompanied by an orchestra conducted by the violinist Arcangelo Corelli. In 1709, on the occasion of the "birthday of Prince Alexander of Poland", he composed the cantata with three voices and instruments La gloria innamorata (text Giacomo Buonaccorsi), performed in the palace of Queen Maria Casimira of Poland.

According to the contemporary Giuseppe Ottavio Pitoni, Colombani left Rome to accept a position as a chapel master in Ronciglione; he then went to various Italian cities, including Naples, and returned to his homeland, where he entered the service of the Marquis d'Este. Later, he returned to Rome and resumed also the position of chapel master in Ronciglione. He died in Rome or nearby on 6 January 1711 due to a hunting accident.

He composed oratorios, cantatas, canons, sacred and instrumental music, including two sonatas for cello and one for oboe. The painter Pier Leone Ghezzi made two ink portraits of Colombani in Filacciano (Rome), fief of the Del Drago family, during the holiday of 1708: in the first the composer is portrayed in hunting clothes; in the second in domestic clothes.

== Bibliography ==
- Alberto Iesuè, "Colombani, Quirino", in Dizionario Biografico degli Italiani, vol. 27, Rome, 1982.
- Giancarlo Rostirolla, "Un compositore di oratori 'celeberrimo' ma 'vario di cervello': Quirino Colombani da Correggio. Appunti per una biografia", in Percorsi dell'oratorio romano: da historia sacra a melodramma spirituale, ed. by Saverio Franchi, Rome, Ibimus, 2002, pp. 199–243.

== Sources ==
- Giuseppe Ottavio Pitoni, Notitia de' contrapuntisti e compositori di musica, ed. by Cesarino Ruini, Florence, Olschki, 1988, p. 343.
- Boni, Filippo de' (1852). Biografia degli artisti ovvero dizionario della vita e delle opere dei pittori, degli scultori, degli intagliatori, dei tipografi e dei musici di ogni nazione che fiorirono da'tempi più remoti sino á nostri giorni. Seconda Edizione.. Venice; Googlebooks: Presso Andrea Santini e Figlio. p. 238.
