= Jacques-Jules Bouffil =

French musician

Jacques Jules Boufil (or Bouffil, Bouffils, Bonfil) (Muret, May 14, 1783 – Toulouse, November 1, 1868) was a French composer and clarinetist.

He was a pupil of Xavier Lefèvre at the Paris Conservatoire, gaining a First Prize in 1806, which until 1817 carried with it the award of a pair of French-made clarinets in B flat and C.

== Discography ==
- Shall-u-mo classical recordings CDC-1003
  - Trio Op.7 No.2 performed by Larry Combs, Paul Drushler, Allen Sigel
