= William Babell =

English composer & violinist (c.1690–1723)

William Babell (or Babel) (c. 1690 – 23 September 1723) was an English musician, composer and prolific arranger of vocal music for harpsichord.

== Life ==
He received his musical training from his father, Charles Babel, a bassoonist in the Drury Lane orchestra, Johann Christoph Pepusch and possibly George Frideric Handel. He played violin in the private band of George I and appeared as a harpsichordist from 1711, often appearing with William Corbett, James Paisible and later Matthew Dubourg. He was associated with Lincoln's Inn Fields Theatre. From November 1718 until his death, he was organist at All Hallows, Bread Street, and was succeeded by John Stanley.

He wrote numerous keyboard arrangements of arias from popular operas of his time. These were published in France, the Netherlands and Germany as well as in England, and formed the basis of his musical reputation. His style was strongly influenced by his close acquaintance with Handel. Johann Mattheson thought he surpassed Handel as an organ virtuoso, but music historian Charles Burney criticised his manner of playing arrangements, charging that he:

acquired great celebrity by wire-drawing the favourite songs of the opera of Rinaldo, and others of the same period, into showy and brilliant lessons, which by mere rapidity of finger in playing single sounds, without the assistance of taste, expression, harmony or modulation, enabled the performer to astonish ignorance, and acquire the reputation of a great player at a small expence … Mr Babel … at once gratifies idleness and vanity.

Despite Burney's criticism, fellow music historian Sir John Hawkins thought they 'succeeded so well ... as to make from it a book of lessons which few could play but himself, and which has long been deservedly celebrated.' Babell's transcription of arias from Handel's opera Rinaldo includes 'Vo' far guerra', which Handel intended as a showpiece for his harpsichord playing and is quite remarkable in its virtuosity; Babell's transcription was made from his memory of how Handel improvised in performances. In 1894, Friedrich Chrysander published Babell's arrangement of 'Vo' far guerra' in the Händel-Gesellschaft volume 48.

Babell also wrote original sonatas for violin or oboe and continuo, concertos and other miscellaneous works, including an Ode for St. Cecelia's day, now lost. His slow movements are thought to show valuable insight into early 18th-century practices of ornamentation and extemporization. The six Concertos op.3 in 7 parts were published in 1726 by John Walsh, three years after the composer's death. They are variously for one or more sixth flutes or soprano recorders in d”. A recording of all six by Anna Stegmann and the Ensemble Odyssee was issued in 2016.

His early death was attributed to 'intemperate habits'. He died in Canonbury, Islington and was buried in All Hallows Church, Bread Street.

== Printed works ==
- The 3rd Book of the Ladys Entertainment, or Banquet of Musick [harpsichord arrangements] (1709)
- The 4th Book of the Ladys Entertainment [harpsichord arrangements] (1716)
- Suits of the Most Celebrated Lessons [harpsichord arrangements of Handel, some original material] (1717), reprinted as Suits of Harpsichord and Spinnet Lessons (1718)
- The Harpsichord Master Improved … with a Choice Collection of Newest and Most Air'y Lessons (1718)
- Trios de diefferents autheurs choises & mis en ordre par Mr Babel [harpsichord arrangements] (1720)
- XII Solos … with Proper Graces Adapted to Each Adagio, book 1 (violin/oboe, harpsichord) (c. 1725)
- XII Solos … with Proper Graces Adapted to Each Adagio, book 2 (violin/oboe/flute, harpsichord)
- Concertos in 7 Parts for violins and small flute, or sixth flute (soprano recorder in D), op. 3 (c. 1726)
- Mariana's Charms Wound my Heart. A new Song for the Spinnet by W. B.
- Would You I the Thing Discover. A Song. Design'd to be Sung ... in the third Act of the Play called 'Tis well if it Takes, the words by Mr. Theobald, etc. (1720?)

== Works in manuscript ==
- Overture in A major, for two solo violins, solo violoncello, orchestra and continuo, with a cembalo solo part in the last movement.
- Add. MS 71209, which contains original and arranged music for harpsichord in Babell's own hand. Among the pieces are an arrangement of the allegro from Handel's Il Pastor Fido with indications for string accompaniment, and two aria arrangements each with an original prelude. The first aria being Caro bene from the pasticcio Clotilda (a similar arrangement in GB-Lfom, Coke 1257) and the second being an early version of Babell's arrangement of Handel's aria Vo' far guerra from Rinaldo found in Suits of the Most Celebrated Lessons.
- GB-Lfom, Coke 1257; contains a collection of preludes and arrangements similar to Babell's Suits of the Most Celebrated Lessons with several having original preludes unique to this collection.
- I-BGi, Ms XIV 8751 H.1 (the Bergamo manuscript) contains eleven toccatas, two suites, seven preludes, a single allemande and a fragmentary arrangement of Henry Carey's 'Sally in our alley'. Several concordances suggest Babell's authorship of most if not all of the music in the manuscript.

== Sources and references ==
- Gerald Gifford (with Terence Best): 'Babell [Babel], William', Grove Music Online ed. L. Macy, http://www.grovemusic.com/, (accessed 2007-05-01)
- J. A. F. Maitland, 'Babell, William (1689/90–1723)', rev. K. D. Reynolds, Oxford Dictionary of National Biography, Oxford University Press, 2004, http://www.oxforddnb.com/, (accessed 2007-05-01)

== Scores ==
- Free scores by William Babell at the International Music Score Library Project (IMSLP)
- Works for Organ and Harpsichord: Scores at the International Music Score Library Project - the transcriptions from Handel in the complete Handel edition (includes 'Vo' far guerra').
