= 1711 in architecture =

The year 1711 in architecture involved some significant events.

== Events ==
- Commission for Building Fifty New Churches set up in London under terms of the New Churches in London and Westminster Act 1710 (9 Ann. c. 17). Most of the nineteen churches it eventually builds or rebuilds will be designed by Nicholas Hawksmoor, with John James, Thomas Archer and James Gibbs also participating.

== Buildings and structures ==
=== New buildings ===
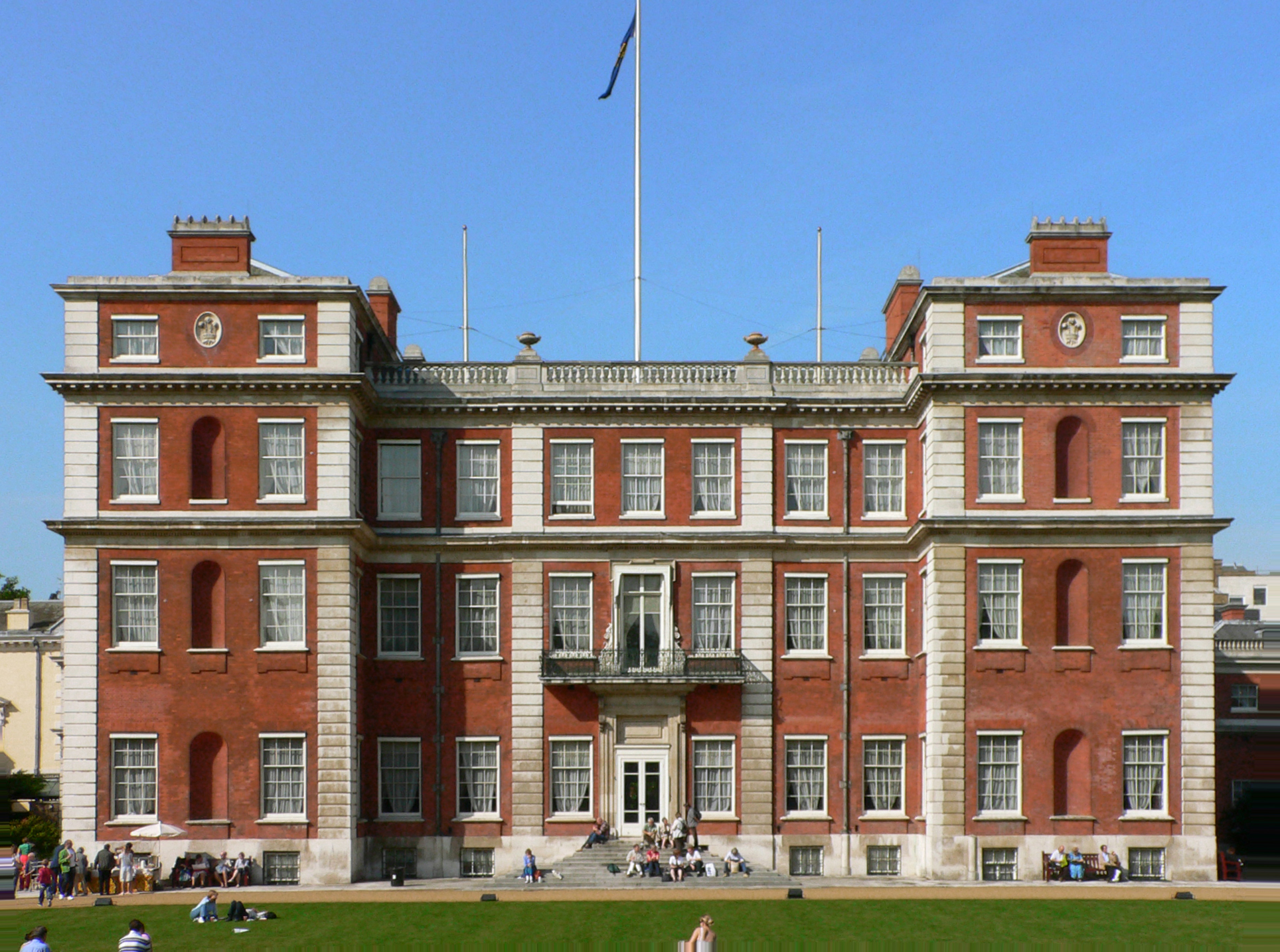
Marlborough House

- Construction begins on Schloss Weißenstein, Bavaria, palatial residence designed for Lothar Franz von Schönborn, Prince-Bishop of Bamberg and Archbishop of Mainz, by Johann Dientzenhofer and Johann Lukas von Hildebrandt.
- Marlborough House in London, designed by Christopher Wren, is completed.
- Menshikov Palace (Saint Petersburg) is opened.
- Pope Clement XI places an Egyptian obelisk in the fountain in front of the Pantheon, Rome.

== Births ==
- September 22 – Thomas Wright, English astronomer, mathematician and garden designer (died 1786)
- December 23 – Jacob Fortling, German-born Danish sculptor, architect and industrialist (died 1761)
- unknown date – Eugénio dos Santos, Portuguese architect and military engineer (died 1760)

== Deaths ==
- unknown date – Henry Bell, English architect (born 1647)
