= Agrippina condotta a morire or Dunque sarà pur vero =

Musical composition by George Frideric Handel

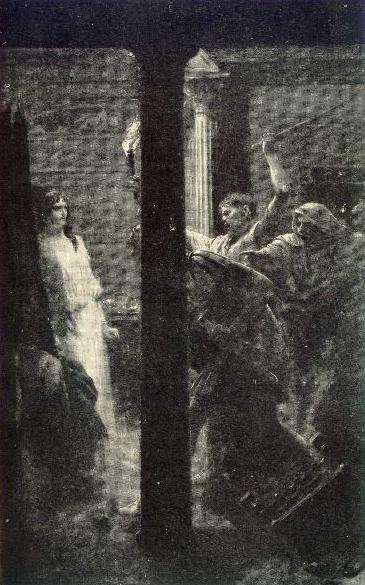
The death of Agrippina

Agrippina condotta a morire or Dunque sarà pur vero, HWV110, is a dramatic secular cantata for soprano, two violins and continuo, composed by George Frideric Handel while he was in Italy, at some time between 1707 and 1708. The anonymous text depicts Roman empress Agrippina the Younger on the way to her execution, which was ordered by her son, the emperor Nero, whom she had schemed to put on the throne. The cantata is approximately fifteen minutes in length; its title may be translated as "Agrippina condemned to die".

== Background ==
The German-born Handel spent several years of his early career living and working in Italy, first in Florence, then in Rome. Operas were banned in Rome by order of the Pope at the time Handel was resident there but the very wealthy Cardinals and leaders of the Church who were Handel's patrons in Rome presented musical entertainments for their guests at their palatial residences. For these occasions Handel composed a series of cantatas, most of them of a pastoral character, but some, as "Agrippina condotta a morire" and others, more in the nature of dramatic monologues.

== The cantata ==
It is not certain exactly when or where the cantata, to a text by an anonymous author, was first performed, but it is probable that it was one of the many secular cantatas Handel composed for entertainment at the palace of Cardinal Ruspoli in Rome, at some point between 1707 and 1708. The soloist was probably the soprano castrato Pasqualino Tiepoli.

The historical Roman empress Agrippina the Younger, wife of the emperor Claudius, had plotted to make her son by another marriage, Nero, Claudius' heir to the throne and had finally poisoned her husband, according to various Roman historians, to ensure the success of her machinations. After a few years, however, Nero tired of his powerful mother's interference and condemned her to death. Handel's cantata depicts Agrippina on the way to her execution, in a series of recitative passages, ariosos and arias, accompanied by two violins and continuo instruments. At first Agrippina bewails her cruel fate, condemned to death by her own son, who owes his position entirely to her. Her mood turning to fury, she calls on the gods to destroy the monster Nero. Torn by conflicting emotions, however, she cannot help feeling love for her son, and vacillates between praying for his success as ruler and her desire that justice should be done. Finally she reconciles herself to her death and the cantata ends with quiet resignation. The way Handel vividly portrays these contrasting emotions in his music makes the piece, in the opinion of musicologist Winton Dean, "a masterpiece".

In 1709, in Venice, Handel produced a full-length opera, "Agrippina", to huge success.

== Recordings ==
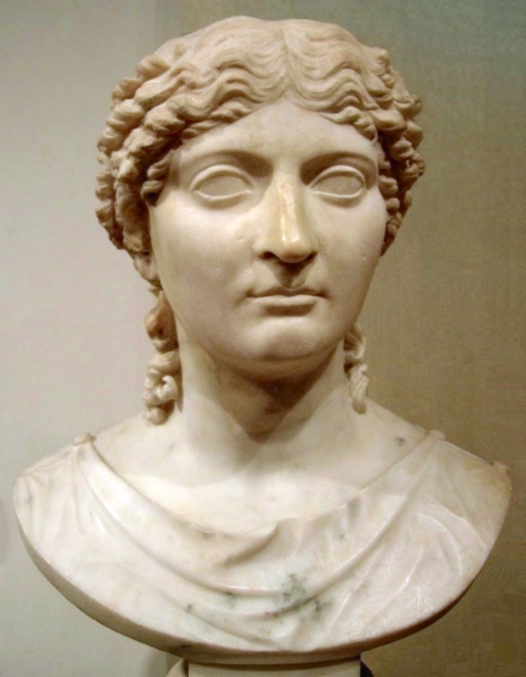
Agrippina the Younger

- Elin Manahan Thomas, soprano, with The Principals of The Symphony of Harmony and Invention, 2006, Coro Cat: COR16045
- Emma Kirby, soprano, with the London Baroque, 2008, BIS Cat:BISSACD1695
- Eva Mei, soprano, with Il Giardino Armonico, director Giovanni Antonini, Warner Classics, Cat: 2564642254
- Roberta Invernizzi, soprano, with La Risonanza, director Fabio Bonizzoni, 2009, Glossa Portrait, Cat: GCDP10002
- Johanna Koslowsky, soprano, with Musica Alta Ripa, MDG Gold, Cat: MDG3090399
- Mária Zádori, soprano, with the Concerto Armonico, director Péter Szûts, Hungaroton, Cat: HCD31534
