= Giovanni Battista Bianchini =

Italian organist, choir director, conductor, and composer of the Baroque period

Giovanni Battista Bianchini (born after 1650 – died 26 September 1708) was an Italian organist, choir director, conductor, and composer of the Baroque period. He served as maestro di cappella at the Orvieto Cathedral (1678–1684) and Rome's Archbasilica of Saint John Lateran (1684–1708). He also was director of the choir at the Oratory of Santissimo Crocifisso; a role he began in 1687. He wrote many oratorios for this ensemble; a genre of composition which was the focus of his creative output.

== Life and career ==
Giovanni Battista Bianchini was born in Rome and lived during the second half of the 17th century. The exact year of his birth is not known. In 1678 he was appointed maestro di cappella at the Orvieto Cathedral. He remained in that post until 1684 when he took the same position at the Archbasilica of Saint John Lateran in Rome. He remained in that role until his death twenty-four years later in 1708. He served simultaneously as first phonascus (a post akin to a choir director) and later "praefectus musicae" at the Oratorio of San Marcello (also known as the Oratory of Santissimo Crocifisso, an oratory connected to the San Marcello al Corso); beginning his work there in 1687. He composed many oratorios for this choir, with his first one dating to 1685, two years before he became the ensemble's director.

Bianchini was a member of the Accademia Nazionale di Santa Cecilia (then known as the Congregazione di San Cecilia). At that institution he served as maestri di cappella 1687, and again in 1691. He involved with opera performances in Orvieto in 1693 that were staged in celebration of Pentecost and Corpus Domini. He was most likely either conductor or choir master at these events. He also served as both organist and maestro di cappella at the San Salvatore in Lauro, Rome in 1694.

Bianchini died in Rome on 26 September 1708.
