= 1719 in music =

This article lists the most significant events and works of the year 1719 in music.

== Events ==
- February – George Frideric Handel leaves his employment at Cannons (the seat of the Duke of Chandos) to become musical director of the Royal Academy of Music (1719). Giovanni Bononcini is brought to London to compose for the Academy.
- August 20 – Francesco Veracini performs at the palace of Moritzburg for the wedding of the Crown Prince to Maria Josepha of Austria.
- November 29 – Domenico Scarlatti arrives in Lisbon to take up his post as kapellmeister to João V of Portugal.
- Bernhard Christoph Breitkopf founds the firm of Breitkopf & Härtel in Leipzig, the world's oldest music publisher.
- Alessandro Scarlatti arrives in Rome.
- Johann Mattheson becomes kapellmeister to the Duke of Holstein.
- Giuseppe Pitoni becomes choirmaster of St Peter's in Rome.
- Antonio Stradivarius makes the "Duke of Marlborough" cello.
- In Japan, the Kumiodori dance form is created by Chokun Tamagusuku.
- Jean-Baptiste Morin becomes "maître de musique" to Louise-Adélaïde, daughter of the Duke of Orléans.

== Published popular music ==
- Thomas Fleet – Mother Goose's Melodies For Children

== Classical music ==
- Johann Sebastian Bach – Brandenburg Concerto No. 5 (presumed date of original composition)
- Johann Joseph Fux – Gesù Cristo negato da Pietro
- Christoph Graupner – Ich bleibe Gott getreu, GWV 1106/19
- George Friedrich Handel
  - Di godere ha speranza il mio core (Oh my dearest, my lovely creature), HWV 288-7
  - Pièces à un & deux clavecins (published); Contains Keyboard Sonata in G major, HWV 579
- Johann David Heinichen – Diana sull'Elba (Serenade; premiered Sept. 18 in Paris)
- Jacques-Martin Hotteterre – L'Art de préluder sur la flûte traversière, Op. 7 (published in Paris)
- George Philipp Telemann
  - Violin Concerto, TWV 51:B1 (composed Sept. 14)
  - Machet die Tore weit, TWV 1:1074 (premiered Mar. 12 in Frankfurt)
- Antonio Vivaldi – 6 Concerti, Op.6 (RV 324, 259, 318, 216, 280, 239)

== Opera ==
- Antonio Caldara – Lucio Papirio dittatore, premiered Nov. 4 in Vienna
- Francesco Gasparini
  - L'Astianatte, premiered in Rome during Carnival
  - Lucio Vero, premiered January in Rome
- Antonio Lotti – Teofane, premiered Sept. 13 in Dresden
- Alessandro Scarlatti
  - Cambise, premiered Feb. 4 in Naples
  - Marco Attilio Regolò
- Antonio Vivaldi
  - Tito Manlio, premiered January in Mantua
  - Il Teuzzone

== Births ==
- April 2 – Vincenzo Legrenzo Ciampi
- April 17 – Christian Gottfried Krause, composer (died 1770)
- by May 4 – Antoine Mahaut, composer (died c. 1785)
- July 16 – William Walond Sr., composer (died 1768)
- September 3 – Ferdinand Zellbell the Younger, Swedish composer (died 1780)
- October 12 – Ignaz Franz, Kapellmeister and composer (died 1790)
- November 9 – Domenico Lorenzo Ponziani, polymath (died 1796)
- November 14 – Leopold Mozart, baroque composer (died 1787)
- November 23 – Johann Gottlob Immanuel Breitkopf, music publisher (died 1794)

== Deaths ==
- January 19 – Joachim Tielke, German instrument-maker (born 1641)
- May – John Lenton, violinist, singer and composer
- June 11 – Johann Abraham Schmierer, composer (born 1661)
- July – Johann Valentin Meder, organist, singer and composer (born 1649)
- July 26 – Johann Georg Christian Störl, organist and composer (born 1675)
- July 28 (buried) – Arp Schnitger, organ builder (born 1648)
- date unknown
  - Michael Mietke, maker of harpsichords and harps (born c.1656/1671)
  - Juan de Navas, harpist and composer (born c.1650)
  - André Raison, organist and composer (born 1650)
- probable
  - Johann Speth, composer
  - Francesco Antonio Urio, composer (born 1631)
