= 1783 in music =

== Events ==
- August 23 – Maria Anna Mozart marries Johann Baptist Franz von Berchtold.
- September 24 – The Bolshoi Kamenny Theatre in Saint Petersburg, Russia, opens with a performance of Giovanni Paisiello’s opera Il mondo della luna.
- John Broadwood patents a piano pedal in England.

== Classical music ==
- Johann Adolph Hasse - Missa Ultima in g minor
- Carl Friedrich Abel – 6 Symphonies, Op. 17
- Johann Georg Albrechtsberger – Mass in D major
- Carl Philipp Emanuel Bach – 2 Sonaten, 2 Fantasien und 3 Rondos für Kenner und Liebhaber, Wq.58
- Ludwig van Beethoven – Three Piano Sonatas, WoO 47 ("Kurfuerstensonaten") in E-flat, F, and D
- Muzio Clementi
  - 3 Piano Sonatas, Op.9
  - 3 Piano Sonatas, Op.10
- Carl Ditters von Dittersdorf – Six Symphonies after Ovid's Metamorphoses
- Jane Mary Guest – 6 Sonatas, Op. 1
- Joseph Haydn
  - Baryton Trio Hob. XI:101, 103, and 108
  - Cello Concerto in D
- Michael Haydn – Symphony in E-flat major
- Anton Kraft – 3 Cello Sonatas, Op. 2
- Joseph Martin Kraus – String Quartets, Op.1 (published, Berlin: J.J. Hummel, Plate 561)
- Wolfgang Amadeus Mozart
  - Luci care, luci belle, K.346/439a
  - Mia speranza adorata, K.416
  - Vorrei spiegarvi, o Dio, K.418
  - Duo for Violin and Viola, K.423
  - Duo for Violin and Viola, K.424
  - Symphony No. 36 in C major, K. 425
  - Great Mass in C minor, K. 427
  - Così dunque tradisci, K.432/421a
  - Ecco quel fiero istante, K.436
  - Mi lagnerò tacendo, K.437
  - Due pupille amabili, K.439
  - Country Dance in G major, K.610
- Giovanni Paisiello – La passione di Gesù Cristo
- Antonio Rosetti – Sextet in D major, M.B24/II:19
- Daniel Gottlob Türk – 12 Leichte Klaviersonaten
- Giovanni Battista Viotti
  - Concerto for Piano No. 7 in G
  - Violin Concerto No.10 in B-flat major
- Samuel Wesley – Magnificat

== Opera ==
- Felice Alessandri – Artaserse
- Pasquale Anfossi – La finta ammalata
- Domenico Cimarosa
  - I due baroni di Rocca Azzurra
  - Oreste
  - La villana riconosciuta
- Vincenzo Fabrizi – I tre gobbi rivali
- André Grétry – La Caravane du Caire
- Niccolò Piccinni – Didon
- Antonio Sacchini – Renaud
- William Shield – The Poor Soldier

== Published popular music ==
- "I had a horse, I had nae mair", "The Rigs o' Barley", and other songs by Robert Burns

== Methods and theory writings ==
- Anton Bemetzrieder
  - Abstract of the Talents and Knowledge of a Musician
  - New Lessons for the Harpsichord
- Johann Michael Weissbeck – Protestationschrift oder Exemplarische Widerlegung
- Georg Friedrich Wolf – Kurzer aber deutlicher Unterricht im Klavierspielen

== Births ==
- January 12 – Erik Gustaf Geijer, writer and composer (d. 1847)
- January 20 – Justus Johann Friedrich Dotzauer, German cellist and composer (d. 1860)
- January 26 – Helmina von Chézy, librettist (d. 1856)
- February 9 – Vasily Zhukovsky, librettist and poet (died 1852)
- February 15 – Johann Nepomuk Poissl, composer
- March 8 – Gottfied Wilhelm Fink, German composer (died 1846)
- March 26 – Johann Baptist Weigl, composer
- April 21 – Reginald Heber, librettist and clergyman (died 1826)
- May 10 – Niccola Benvenuti, composer
- May 14 – Jacques Jules Bouffil, composer and musician (died 1868)
- May 22 – Thomas Forbes Walmisley, composer (died 1866)
- June 29 – August Alexander Klengel, pianist, organist and composer
- September 23 – Jane Taylor, librettist and poet (died 1824)
- October 13 – Frantiszek Soltyk, composer
- December 14 – Johann Christoph Kienlen, composer
- December 28 – Wenzel Robert von Gallenberg, composer
- date unknown – Charles-François-Jean-Baptiste Moreau, French librettist (died 1832)

== Deaths ==
- January 5 – Friedrich Wilhelm Riedt, flautist, music theorist and composer (born 1710)
- January 10 – Phanuel Bacon, librettist and writer (born 1700)
- January 14 – Giacobbe Cervetto, cellist and composer (born 1682)
- January 31 – Caffarelli, castrato singer (born 1710)
- February 10 – James Nares, composer (born 1715)
- February 21 – Richard Duke, violin maker (born 1718)
- March 1 – Thomas Lowe, tenor (born c.1719)
- March 23 – Gaspard Fritz, composer
- April 7 – Franz Johann Habermann, composer (born 1706)
- April 7 – Ignaz Holzbauer, composer (born 1711)
- May 11 – Juliane Reichardt, composer and pianist (born 1752)
- May 18 – Lucrezia Aguiari, coloratura soprano (born 1741)
- July 27 – Johann Kirnberger, music theorist/violist (born 1721)
- October 7 – William Tans'ur, composer, teacher and arranger of hymn tunes (born c.1706)
- October 29 – Jean le Rond d'Alembert, music theorist and philosopher (born 1717)
- November 3 – Charles Collé, songwriter (born 1709)
- December 16 – Johann Adolph Hasse, singer, composer and music teacher (born 1699)
- December 20 – Antonio Soler, composer (born 1729)
