= 1715 in music =

The year 1715 in music involved some significant events.

== Events ==
- September – Presumed staging of first Three Choirs Festival in England.
- Comédie en vaudeville is staged for the first time in Paris.
- Francesco Geminiani performs at the court of King George I of Great Britain, accompanied by Handel.

== Classical music ==
- Tomaso Albinoni – 12 Concerti a cinque, Op. 7
- Johann Sebastian Bach
  - Der Himmel lacht! die Erde jubiliert, BWV 31
  - Bereitet die Wege, bereitet die Bahn, BWV 132
  - Nur jedem das Seine, BWV 163
  - Ach! ich sehe, itzt, da ich zur Hochzeit gehe, BWV 162
  - O heilges Geist- und Wasserbad, BWV 165
  - Barmherziges Herze der ewigen Liebe, BWV 185
  - Valet will ich dir geben, BWV 736
  - English Suites (speculated year of composition) BWV 806–811
  - Suite in F minor, BWV 823
  - Prelude and Fugue in A minor, BWV 894
  - Fugue in A major, BWV 949
- Francesco Antonio Bonporti – Concerti a quattro, Op. 11
- Antonio Caldara – Motetti a due e tre voci, Op. 4
- François Couperin Concerts royaux
- George Frideric Handel
  - Brockes-Passion, HWV 48
  - Concerto Grosso in B-flat major, HWV 313
  - Concerto Grosso in D minor, HWV 316
  - Concerto Grosso in D major, HWV 317
- Jacques Hotteterre – Pièces pour la flûte traversiere, Op. 5
- Elisabeth Jacquet de la Guerre – Cantates Françoises, Livre 3
- Jean-Baptiste Loeillet – 12 Recorder Sonatas, Op. 3
- Alessandro Marcello – Oboe Concerto in D minor, S.Z799
- Gaetano Meneghetti – Violin Concerto in A major
- James Paisible – The Friendship, Mr. Isaac's new dance for the year 1715...
- Jean-Philippe Rameau – Thétis, RCT 28
- Johann Ernst Prinz von Sachsen-Weimar – Violin Concerto in G major
- Alessandro Scarlatti
  - Sinfonie di concerto grosso
  - Stabat Mater.
- Johann Christian Schickhardt – 6 Concertos for 4 Recorders and Continuo, Op. 19
- Georg Philipp Telemann
  - 6 Sonates à violon seul accompagné par le clavessin
  - Sonata à 4, TWV 43:a5
- Carlo Tessarini – 12 Concerti a cinque, Op. 1
- Antonio Vivaldi
  - Violin Concerto in A major, RV 345
  - Violin Concerto in B-flat major, RV 363
- John Walsh (pub.) – The Bird Fancyer's Delight
- Jan Dismas Zelenka – Capriccio in D major, ZWV 182

== Opera ==
- Giovanni Bononcini – Astarto
- George Frideric Handel – Amadigi di Gaula
- Johann Augustin Kobelius – Der unschuldig verdammte Heinrich, Fürst von Wallis
- Giuseppe Maria Orlandini – Bacocco e Serpilla
- Alessandro Scarlatti – Il Tigrane
- Domenico Scarlatti – La Dirindina
- Antonio Vivaldi – Nerone Fatto Cesare

== Births ==
- January 12 – Jacques Duphly, composer (died 1789)
- January 29 – Georg Christoph Wagenseil, composer (died 1777)
- April 11 – John Alcock, composer
- April 19 – James Nares, composer (died 1783)
- April 23 – Johann Friedrich Doles, composer (died 1797)
- April 28 – Franz Sparry, composer (died 1767)
- May 11
  - Johann Gottfried Bernhard Bach, organist and son of Johann Sebastian Bach (died 1739)
  - Ignazio Fiorillo, composer (died 1787)
- November 10 – Johann August Landvoigt, librettist and musician (died 1766)
- November 16 – Girolamo Abos, composer (died 1760)
- December – Isabella Lampe, soprano and wife of John Frederick Lampe (died 1795)
- December 12 – Gennaro Manna, composer (died 1779)
- date unknown
  - Giovanni Battista Casali, musician (died 1792)
  - William Felton – (died 1769)
  - Francesco Zoppis, composer (died after 1781)

== Deaths ==
- January 15 – Caspar Neumann, hymnist (born 1648)
- January 22 – Marc'Antonio Ziani, composer (born c.1653)
- February 3 – Gottfried Vopelius, composer
- June 20 – Angelo Olivieri, composer (born c. 1636)
- July 30 – Nahum Tate, hymn-writer and lyricist (born 1652)
- September 2 – Constantin Christian Dedekind, composer
- September 6 – Basilius Petritz, German composer and Kreuzkantor in Dresden (born 1647)
- October 6 – Melchior Hoffmann, composer
- date unknown
  - Antonio de Salazar, composer (born c.1650)
  - Diego Xaraba, Spanish organist and composer (born 1652)
- probable
  - Daniel Eberlin, composer (born 1647)
  - Vasily Polikarpovich Titov, Russian composer
