= Johann Christian Schickhardt =

German composer and woodwind player (1682–1762)

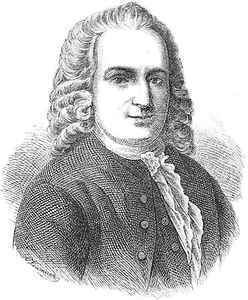
Portrait of Johann Christian Schikhardt

Johann Christian Schickhardt (or Schikardt; c. 1682 – c. 25 March 1762) was a German composer and woodwind player.

== Biography ==
Schickhardt was born in Braunschweig, Principality of Brunswick-Wolfenbüttel and received his musical education at the Braunschweig-Wolfenbüttel court under the patronage of Augustus William, third son and heir of Anthony Ulrich, Duke of Brunswick-Wolfenbüttel. In the first decade of the 18th century, he was employed in the Netherlands and associated with Friedrich of Hesse-Cassel, Henriëtte Amalia van Anhalt-Dessau (daughter of John George II, Prince of Anhalt-Dessau and widow of Henry Casimir II, Prince of Nassau-Dietz) and her son John William Friso, Prince of Orange. In the second decade of the 18th century, Schickhardt lived in Hamburg, where it is speculated by musicologist Andrew D. McCredie that he was a member of the Hamburg Opera in Gänsemarkt as a flutist or oboist. There is evidence suggesting that, in the 1720s, Schickhardt could have been an occasional oboist with the court orchestra of Leopold, Prince of Anhalt-Köthen, employer of Johann Sebastian Bach. By the 1740s, records place Schickhardt at the University of Leiden as a student, and at his death in 1762, the university described him as "a master of musical arts and a member of the Academy," although there is no surviving record of his musical activity in Leiden otherwise.

== Works ==
In the first half of the 18th century, numerous works of his, mostly chamber music featuring the treble recorder, appeared in print from publishers Estienne Roger and Le Cène in Amsterdam. At least 30 sets of musical works are known to have been published, some of which are no longer extant. A catalog of Schickhardt's published and manuscript works was published by David Lasocki in 1977. With the revival of the treble recorder in the early 20th century, a great interest in suitable repertoire for the instrument developed and some of Schickhardt's works were republished in new editions. It is predominantly through his works for recorder that Schickhardt is known today.

Schickhardt's compositions include sonatas for solo recorder and basso continuo (op. 1, op. 17 and op. 23) as well as trio sonatas for two recorders and basso continuo (op. 16). Besides these, there are also compositions that stand between the chamber and larger scale concert music styles, e.g., his op. 19, 6 concertos (C,d,G,F,e,c) for four recorders and basso continuo and his six sonatas (Op. 22) for 2 recorders, oboe, and basso continuo. Some short works by Schickhardt can also be found in The Compleat Tutor to the Hautboy, an oboe tutor published by Walsh and Hare about 1715. Additionally, Schickhardt wrote a recorder concerto in G minor and L'Alphabet de la musique (op. 30, c. 1735), which contains sonatas in all 24 keys.

== List of works ==
Source: Lasocki

Published works

- Opus 1: Seven sonatas for alto recorder and basso continuo
- Opus 2: Seven sonatas for oboe or violin and basso continuo
- Opus 3: Seven sonatas for alto recorder and basso continuo
- Opus 4: [Six?] sonatas for 2 alto recorders and basso continuo
- Opus 5: Six sonatas for alto recorder, 2 oboes or violins, viola da gamba and basso continuo
- Opus 6: Six sonatas for 2 alto recorders and basso continuo
- Opus 7: Twelve sonatas for 2 oboes or violins and basso continuo
- Opus 8: Six sonatas for violin or oboe and basso continuo
- Opus 9: Six sonatas for 2 alto recorder (basso continuo ad libitum)
- Opus 10: Six sonatas for 2 oboes or violins or flutes (basso continuo ad libitum)
- Opus 11: Recueil de Menuets à un dessus & Basse continue – a collection of minuets for a melody instrument and basso continuo.
- Opus 12: Recorder Method (includes 42 Airs for 2 recorders)
- Opus 13: Six concertos for 2 Violins, 2 oboes or violins and basso continuo
- Opus 14: Six sonates for alto recorder, oboe or violin, viola da gamba and basso continuo
- Opus 15: Oboe Method (includes Airs for 2 oboes)
- Opus 16: Twelve sonatas for 2 alto recorders and basso continuo
- Opus 17: Twelve sonatas for alto recorder and basso continuo
- Opus 18/1: A collection of Airs for alto recorder
- Opus 18/2: A collection of 146 Airs for alto recorder
- Opus 19: Six concertos for 4 alto recorders and basso continuo
- Opus 20/1: Six sonatas for flute or oboe or violin and basso continuo
- Opus 20/2: Six sonatas for flute or oboe or violin and baso continuo
- Opus 21: Airs spirituels des Luthériens for 2 alto recorders and basso continuo
- Opus 22: Six sonatas for 2 alto recorders, oboe and basso continuo
- Opus 23: Twelve sonatas for alto recorder and basso continuo
- Opus 24: Six sonatas for alto recorder and basso continuo
- Opus 25: Six sonatas for violin and basso continuo
- Opus 26: Six sonatas for 2 alto recorders
- Opus 30: L'Alphabeth de la musique – 24 sonatas for flute or violin or alto recorder and basso continuo
- Miscellaneous pieces for recorder, oboe and two recorders in: The Compleat Tutor to the Hautboy (London: Walsh & Hare, ca. 1715), The Compleat Flute Master... (London, Bennett, ca. 1760) and Airs for 2 alto recorders by Gasparo Visconti, 2nd edition "augmented by several pieces by Schickhardt"

Works preserved as manuscripts

Autographs

- Concerto in g for alto recorder with 2 oboes, 2 violins, viola, violoncello, bass and basso continuo
- Suite in F for violin, 2 oboes and 2 alto recorders with 2 violins, viola, violoncello, bass and basso continuo

Other manuscript works

- "Sonata de Monr: Schicard" in d for a melody instrument ( alto recorder?) and basso continuo
- Sonata for alto recorder and basso continuo and a sonata for violin and basso continuo
- Six trio sonatas for 2 alto recorders and basso continuo

Arrangements

- Twelve sonatas for 2 violins and basso continuo, Opus 1, by Giovanni Battista Tibaldi, arranged by Schickhardt for 2 alto recorders and basso continuo
- Six concertos for 2 alto recorders and basso continuo, arranged by Schickhardt from the Concerti Grossi Opus 6 by Arcangelo Corelli
