= Michel de la Barre =

French composer and flautist

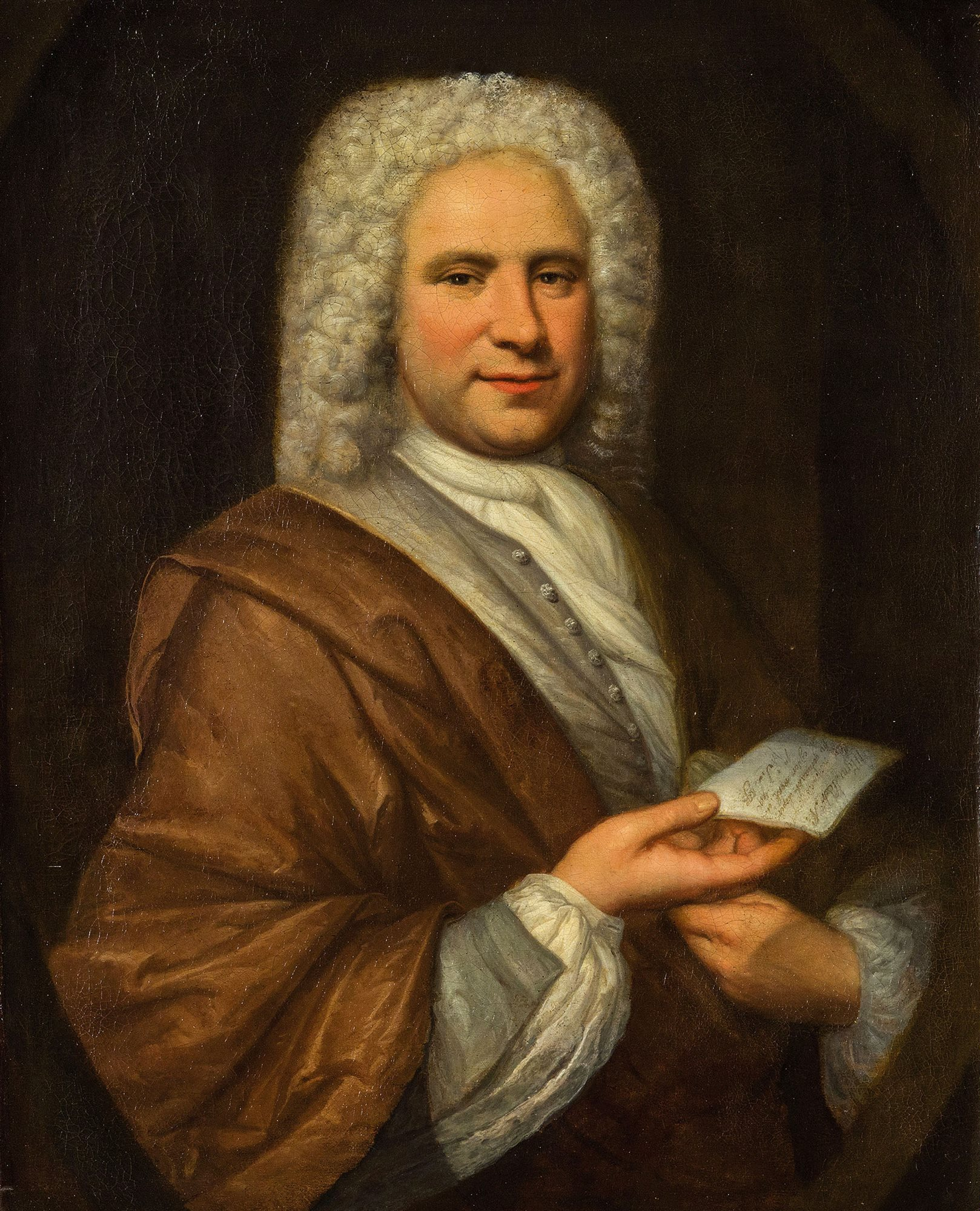
Portrait of Michel de La Barre painted by Hyacinthe Rigaud

Michel de la Barre (c. 1675 – 15 March 1745) was a French composer and renowned flautist known as being the first person to publish solo flute music. He played at the Académie Royale de Musique, the Musettes and Hautbois de Poitou and the courts of Louis XIV and Louis XV.

== Works ==
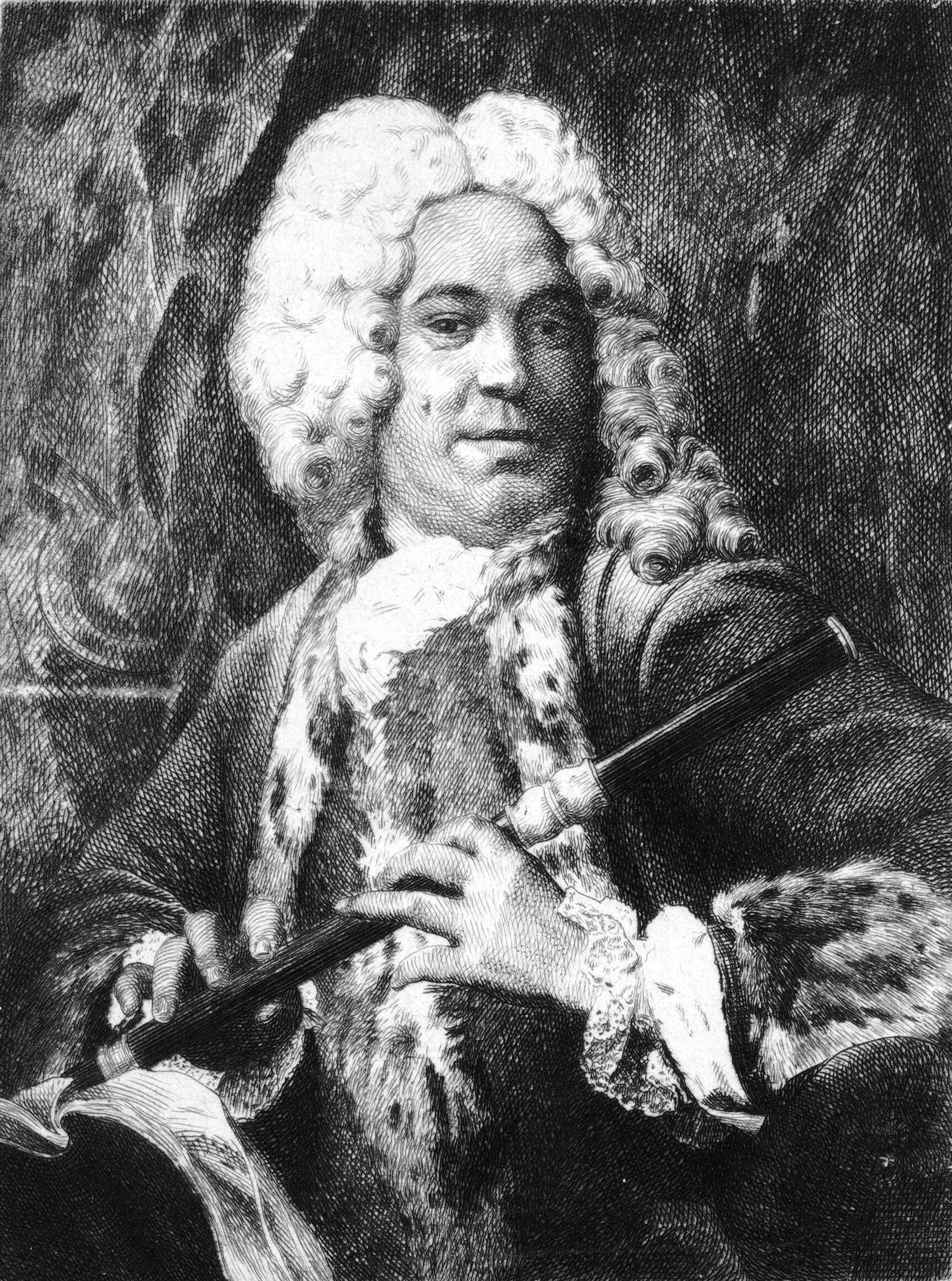
Portrait presumed to be Michel de La Barre, anonymous etching, private collection.

- 1694 : Premier Livre des Trio, pour les violons, Flûtes et hautbois, par Monsieur De La Barre, Flûte de la Chambre du Roy, Paris, Christophe Ballard, 1694; Seconde Edition, revûë & corrigée [...], Paris, Christophe Ballard.
- 1700 : Le triomphe des arts, opéra-ballet, 5 acts (without prologue), libretto by Houdar de La Motte, first performed on 16 May 1700 by the Académie Royale de Musique at the Théâtre du Palais-Royal in Paris
- 1700 : Pièces en trio pour les violons, flustes et hautbois, composées Par le sieur De La Barre, Livre Second, [...], Paris, Christophe Ballard.
- 1702 : Pièces pour la Flûte Traversière avec la Basse-Continue, [...] Œuvre Quatrième, [...], Paris, Christophe Ballard.
- 1705 : La vénitienne, comédie-ballet, prologue and 3 acts, libretto by Houdar de La Motte, first performed on 26 May 1705 by the Académie Royale de Musique at the Palais-Royal in Paris
- 1707 : Troisième Livre des Trio pour les violons, flûtes, et hautbois, mélez de Sonates pour la Flûte traversière, [...], Paris, Christophe Ballard.
- 1709 : Air dans Airs sérieux et à boire de différents auteurs [...], Christophe Ballard, mars 1709 [p. 57; PBN Vm7 542] : « Vous me parlez toujours d’Iris »
- 1709 : Première Suite de Pièces à deux flûtes traversières, [...], Paris, Foucaut.
- 1710 : Deuxième Suite de Pièces à deux flûtes traversières, [...], Paris, Foucaut.
- 1710 : Deuxième Livre de Pièces pour la flûte traversière, Avec la Basse Continuë, [...], Paris, Foucaut.
- 1711 : Troisième Suite à deux flûtes traversières sans basse, [...], Paris, Foucault.
- 1711 : Quatrième [& 5^{e}] Suite [s] à deux flûtes traversières sans basse, [...], Paris, Foucault.
- 1713 : Cinquième Livre contenant la Sixième, et la septième suite à deux flûtes traversières sans basse, [...], Paris, Foucault.
- 1714 : Sixième Livre contenant la huitième et la neuvième Suite à deux Flûtes Traversières sans basse, [...], Paris, Foucault.
- 1721 : Septième Livre contenant la Xe et la XIe Suitte de Pièces à 2 Flûtes-Traversieres fans Baße. [...], Paris, Boivin.
- 1722 : Neufième Livre contenant deux Sonates à deux flûtes traversières sans Basse. [...], Paris, Boivin.
- 1722 : Dixième Livre contenant 2 Suittes à deux Flûtes-Traversières sans Basse. [...], Paris, Boivin.
- 1722 : Huitième Livre, contenant Deux Suites pour la flûte traversière avec la basse, [...], Paris, Boivin.
- 1724 : Recueil d’airs à boire à deux parties...
- 1725 : Douzième Livre contenant Deux Suites à deux Flûtes Traversières fans Basse. [...], Paris, Boivin.
