= 1712 in music =

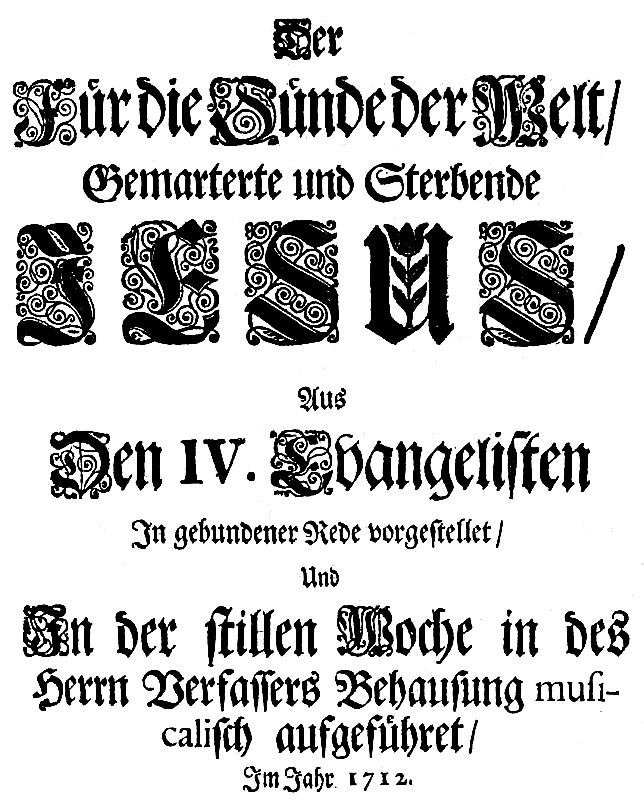
Brockes - The martyred and dying Jesus for the sin of the world - titlepage of the libretto from 1712

The year 1712 in music involved some significant events.

== Events ==
- March 18 – Georg Philipp Telemann arrives in Frankfurt to take up his new post as city director of music and Kapellmeister at the Barfüsserkirche.
- March 25 – Approximate date of the première of Johann Sebastian Bach's St Mark Passion pastiche at the chapel of Wilhelmsburg Castle (two movements by Bach).
- September – George Frideric Handel re-locates to London, with the permission of his patron, the future King George I of Great Britain.
- Johann Georg Pisendel joins the court orchestra at Dresden.

== Classical music ==
- Tomaso Albinoni – 12 Trattenimenti armonici, Op. 6
- Johann Sebastian Bach
  - Prelude and Fugue in G major, BWV 541
  - Toccata, Adagio and Fugue in C major, BWV 564
  - Fantasia in G major, BWV 572
  - Toccata in F-sharp minor, BWV 910
  - Fugue in B minor, BWV 951
  - Fughetta in C minor, BWV 961
  - Suite in E minor for lute, BWV 996
- Francesco Antonio Bonporti – 10 Inventions, Op. 10
- Pieter Bustijn – 9 Suittes pour le clavessin
- Henry Carey – Setting of "The Lord My Pasture Shall Prepare" (hymn) by Joseph Addison
- Arcangelo Corelli – Twelve Concerti Grossi, Op. 6 (composed)
- Evaristo Felice Dall'Abaco
  - Concerti a quattro da chiesa, Op. 2
  - 12 Trio Sonatas, Op. 3
- Christoph Graupner
  - Jesus ist und bleibt mein Leben, GWV 1107/12
  - Mein Gott, warum hast du mich verlassen?, GWV 1118/12a
  - Wenn wir in höchsten Nöten sein, GWV 1143/12
  - Demütiget euch nun, GWV 1144/12
  - Zähle meine Flucht, GWV 1154/12b
  - Wer da glaubet dass Jesus sei der Christ, GWV 1171/12
- George Frideric Handel – O Sing unto the Lord a New Song, HWV 249a
- Jacques-Martin Hotteterre
  - Sonates en trio pour les flûtes traversières et a bec, violon, hautbois, Op. 3
  - Suite in B minor, Op. 4
- Reinhard Keiser – Brockes-Passion (Text by Barthold Heinrich Brockes)
- Ferdinando Antonio Lazzari – Concerto in D major
- John Loeillet – Lessons for the Harpsichord or Spinet
- Benedetto Marcello – 12 Recorder Sonatas, Op. 2
- Jean-Baptiste Morin – Cantates françoises à une et trois voix, Op. 6
- James Paisible – The Gloucester. Mr. Isaac's new dance, made for Her Majesty's Birth Day...
- Anne Danican Philidor – Premier livre de pièces
- Giovanni Antonion Piani – 12 Violin Sonatas, Op. 1
- Charles Piroye – Pièces d'orgue
- Jean-Féry Rebel – Boutade
- Georg Philipp Telemann
  - Das ist meine Freude, TWV 8:17
  - Ouverture-Suite, TWV 55:A5 (approx.)
- Francesco Maria Veracini – Il trionfo della innocenza patrocinata da S. NiccoI (oratorio)
- Antonio Vivaldi – Violin Concerto in D major, RV 212
- Johann Gottfried Walther – Meinen Jesum laß ich nicht
- Jan Dismas Zelenka – Attendite et videte, ZWV 59

== Opera ==
- André Campra – Idomenée
- André Cardinal Destouches – Callirhoé
- George Frideric Handel
  - Il Pastor Fido
  - Teseo, HWV 9 (composed)
- John Hughes (1677–1720) and Johann Ernst Galliard (d. 1747) – Calypso and Telemachus (opera)
- Antonio Lotti – Porsenna

== Births ==
- January
  - David Owen, harpist (died 1741)
  - Cecilia Young, soprano, wife of Thomas Arne (died 1789)
- January 17 – John Stanley, composer and organist (died 1786)
- January 24 – Frederick II of Prussia, enthusiastic amateur musician and composer (died 1786)
- January 26 – Giacomo Puccini, Italian composer and head of a musical dynasty (died 1781)
- June 28 – Jean-Jacques Rousseau, polymath (died 1778)
- July – John Hebden, musician and composer (died 1765)
- date unknown
  - Marimutthu Pillai, Carnatic music composer (died 1787)
  - John Christopher Smith, composer (died 1795)
  - Sophia Schröder, vocalist at the Kungliga Hovkapellet (died 1750)
- probable – Kane O'Hara, playwright and musician (died 1782)

== Deaths ==
- April – Lambert Chaumont, organist and composer (born c.1630)
- April 29 – Juan Bautista Jose Cabanilles, composer
- August 7 – Friedrich Wilhelm Zachau, organist at Halle (born 1663)
- August 26 – Sebastian Anton Scherer, composer (born 1631)
- September 30 – Johann Michael Zächer, composer (born 1649)
- November 6 – Johann Bernhard Staudt, composer (born 1654)
- date unknown
  - Buhurizade Mustafa Itri, composer and performer of Turkish classical music (born c.1640)
  - Juan de Araujo, Spanish composer active in South and Central America (born 1646)
  - Carlo Alessandro Guidi, poet and songwriter (born 1650)
- probable – Carlo Ambrogio Lonati, violinist, composer and singer
