= Thomas Gladwin (musician) =

English composer and musician

Thomas Gladwin (1710–1799) was an English composer and musician. He was an organist at Vauxhall Gardens, London, England, for some time. Like many English musicians of the time, he seems to have been influenced by Domenico Scarlatti. Some of his harpsichord works have been recorded.
