= 1713 in music =

The year 1713 in music involved some significant events.

== Events ==
- Foundation of the Académie Royale de Danse by King Louis XIV of France.
- Daniel Purcell becomes organist at St Andrew's Church, Holborn, London.
- Francesco Bartolomeo Conti becomes court composer to the Habsburgs in Vienna.
- Giuseppe Tartini claims to have had a dream in which he allows the devil to play his violin.
- Antonio Stradivari makes the Gibson Stradivarius.

== Publications ==
- Giuseppe Matteo Alberti – 10 Violin Concertos, Op. 1
- Francesco Antonio Bonporti – Invenzioni a violino solo, Op. 10 (Italian edition). Venice-Trento: Giovanni Parone.
- Johann Heinrich Buttstett
  - Musicalische Clavier-Kunst und Vorraths-Kammer
  - Praeludium & Capricio
- Louis-Nicolas Clérambault – Cantates françoises, Book 2 (inc. Léandre et Héro, Alphée et Aréthuse, Pirame et Tisbé and Pigmalion)
- François Couperin – Pièces de clavecin, book 1
- William Croft – Musicus Apparatus Academicus
- Louis-Antoine Dornel – Sonates en Trio, Op. 3
- Johann Mattheson – Das neu-eröffnete Orchestre (Hamburg: Mattheson)
- Jean-Féry Rebel – 12 Violin Sonatas
- Johann Christian Schieferdecker – XII. Musicalische Concerte, bestehend aus etlichen Ouverturen und Suiten

== Classical music ==
- Johann Sebastian Bach
  - Gleichwie der Regen und Schnee vom Himmel fällt, BWV 18
  - Ich hatte viel Bekümmernis, BWV 21
  - Ich lasse dich nicht BWV Anh. 159
  - Was mir behagt, ist nur die muntre Jagd, BWV 208
  - Organ Concerto in A minor, BWV 593
  - Organ Concerto in C major, BWV 594
  - Organ Concerto in C major, BWV 595 (based on Johann Ernst Prinz von Sachsen-Weimar Op.1)
  - Organ Concerto in D minor, BWV 596
  - Herr Christ, der einge Gottessohn, BWV 601
  - Puer natus in Bethlehem, BWV 603
  - Der Tag, der ist so freudenreich, BWV 605
  - Vom Himmel hoch, da komm ich her, BWV 606
  - In dulci jubilo, BWV 608
  - Jesu, meine Freude, BWV 610
  - Helft mir Gottes Güte preisen, BWV 613
  - Prelude in C minor, BWV 921
  - 16 Konzerte nach verschiedenen Meistern, BWV 972–987
  - Trio Sonata in F major, BWV 1040
  - Canon in A minor, BWV 1073
  - Alles mit Gott und nichts ohn' ihn, BWV 1127
- Antonio Caldara – Oratorio di S. Stefano, primo re dell'Ungheria
- Christoph Graupner
  - Wie bald hast du gelitten, GWV 1109/14
  - Ich bin zwar Asch und Kot, GWV 1135/13
  - Was Gott tut das ist wohlgetan, GWV 1153/13
- George Frideric Handel
  - Ode for the Birthday of Queen Anne, HWV 74
  - Utrecht Te Deum and Jubilate
  - As Pants the Hart, HWV 251a
- Elisabeth Jacquet de la Guerre – La Musette, ou les Bergers de Suresne
- James Paisible – The Pastorall. Mr. Isaac's new dance, made for Her Majesty's Birth Day, 1713...
- Antonio Vivaldi – Beatus vir, RV 598

== Opera ==
- Francesco Feo – L'amor tirannico, ossia Zenobia
- George Frideric Handel
  - Teseo, HWV 9, Premiered January 10 in London
  - Silla, HWV 10
- Nicola Porpora – Basilio re d'oriente
- Antonio Vivaldi
  - Orlando furioso
  - Ottone in villa, RV 729

== Births ==
- January 7 – Giovanni Battista Locatelli, opera director (1785)
- February 13 – Domènech Terradellas, composer (died 1751)
- March – Giammaria Ortes, Venetian composer and polymath (d. 1790)
- March 12 – Johann Adolph Hass, clavichord and harpsichord maker (died 1771)
- April 7 – Nicola Sala, composer and music theorist (died 1801)
- April 13 – Pierre Jélyotte, operatic tenor (died 1797)
- October 3 – Antoine Dauvergne, violinist and composer (died 1797)
- October 13 – Johann Ludwig Krebs, composer (died 1780)
- October 24 – Marie Fel, opera singer (died 1794)
- December 10 – Johann Nicolaus Mempel, musician (died 1747)
- date unknown
  - Johan Henrik Freithoff, violinist and composer (died 1767)
  - Johannes Erasmus Iversen, composer (died 1755)
- probable – Robert Bremner, music publisher (died 1789)

== Deaths ==
- January 8 – Arcangelo Corelli, composer and violinist (born 1653)
- March 26 – Paul I, 1st Prince Esterházy of Galántha, composer
- March 30 – Govert Bidloo, opera librettist (born 1649)
- April 14 – Marcus Fronius, theologian, poet and musician (born 1659)
- October 28 – Paolo Lorenzani, composer (born 1640)
- October 31 – Ferdinando de' Medici, Grand Prince of Tuscany, patron of music (born 1663)
- date unknown – Ludovico Roncalli, composer for guitar (born 1654)
- probable – Stanisław Sylwester Szarzyński, composer
