= 1698 in music =

The year 1698 in music involved some significant events.

== Events ==
- Henry Purcell's widow publishes the first volume of Orpheus Britannicus.
- Antonio Stradivari makes the "Cabriac" violin.

== Classical music ==
- Johann Sebastian Bach – Ach, was soll ich Sünder machen, BWV 770
- Sébastien de Brossard – Retribue servo tuo, SdB.004
- Antonio Caldara – Maddalena ai piedi di Cristo
- Marc-Antoine Charpentier
  - Missa Assumpta est Maria, H.11
  - In nativitatem Domini canticum, H.421
- Daniel Danielis – Cœleste Convivium del Signor (Coll. Brossard)
- Michel Richard Delalande – Regina Coeli, S.53
- Sebastian Knüpfer – Ecce quam bonum et quam iucundum (Psalm 133), for 5 solo voices, 5-part choir, 2 violins, 3 violas, bassoon, and basso continuo
- Johann Krieger – Anmuthige Clavier-Übung (Nuremberg), a collection of 25 pieces for organ, including ricercars, fugues, preludes, etc.
- August Kühnel – 14 Sonate ò Partite ad una o due viole da gamba, con il basso continuo (Kassel)
- Isabella Leonarda – Salmi concertati a 4 voci con strumenti, Op. 19 (Bologna)
- Christian Liebe – O Heiland aller Welt ich muß dir sehnlich klagen
- Georg Muffat – Florilegium Secundum (Passau)
- Daniel Purcell – 6 Sonatas or Solos
- Johann Abraham Schmierer – Zodiaci musici
- Giuseppe Torelli – Concerti musicali a quattro op.6

== Opera ==
- Richard Leveridge – The Island Princess
- Luigi Manza – Tito Manlio; Partenope
- Alessandro Scarlatti
  - La donna ancora è fedele
  - Il prigioniero fortunato, R.346.36

== Births ==
- January 3 – Metastasio, born Pietro Antonio Domenico Trapassi, poet and opera librettist (died 1782)
- July 24 – František Jiránek, composer (died 1778)
- September 8 – François Francoeur, violinist and composer (died 1787)
- date unknown
  - Pietro Auletta, composer (died 1771)
  - Antonio Bioni, composer (died 1739)
  - Riccardo Broschi, composer (died 1756)
  - Célestin Harst, priest, organist and composer (died 1778)
- probable – Giovanni Battista Sammartini, composer (died 1775)

== Deaths ==
- date unknown – Thomas Connellan, composer and harpist (born c.1640)
- probable – Nicola Matteis, violinist and composer (born c.1670)
