= 1706 in music =

The year 1706 in music involved some significant events.

== Events ==
- Louis-Antoine Dornel succeeds François d'Agincourt as organist at the church of Sainte-Marie-Madeleine-en-la-Cité.
- David Tecchler makes the cello now on loan to Denis Brott from the Canada Council for the Arts Musical Instrument Bank.

== Published popular music ==
- Thomas D'Urfey – Wit and Mirth, or Pills to Purge Melancholy, vol. 4 (collection of songs)

== Classical music ==
- Johann Sebastian Bach – Fantasia in C minor, BWV 1121
- Francesco Bartolomeo Conti – Il Gioseffo
- John Gostling – the "Gostling manuscript", a collection of sixty-four anthems: seventeen by Henry Purcell, twenty-three by John Blow, three by Matthew Locke, four by Pelham Humfrey, four by William Turner, and one by William Child, one by Henry Aldrich, three by Thomas Tudway, four by Jeremiah Clarke, and a few others.
- Jean-Adam Guilain – Pièces d'orgue pour le Magnificat sur les huit tons différents de l'église
- George Frideric Handel
  - Chi rapì la pace al core, HWV 90
  - Figlio d'alte speranze, HWV 113
  - Lucrezia, HWV 145
  - Tu fedel? tu costante?, HWV 171
  - Udite il mio consiglio, HWV 172
  - Laudate pueri Dominum, HWV 236
  - Lesson in A minor, HWV 496
- Michele Mascitti – 15 Violin Sonatas, Op.2
- Francesco Nicola Fago – Confitebor tibi Domine
- James Paisible - The Britannia, Mr. Isaac's new dance, made for Her Majesty's Birth Day...
- Maria Pannina – Il trionfo dell'amor santo espresso nella conquista del cuore, a collection of canzonettas for two voices
- Michel Pignolet de Montéclair – Cantates à voix seule et avec simfonie
- Jean-Philippe Rameau – Premier Livre de Pieces de Clavecin
- Jean-Baptiste Stuck – Cantates Françaises et Italiennes
- Stanisław Sylwester Szarzyński – Trio Sonata in D major
- Giuseppe Valentini – 7 Idee per Camera, Op.4

== Opera ==
- Toussaint Bertin de la Doué – Cassandre
- Antonio Maria Bononcini – Arminio
- Francesco Mancini – Alessandro il Grande in Sidone
- Marin Marais – Alcyone
- Alessandro Scarlatti
  - Il Gran Tamerlano
  - Lucio Manlio l'imperioso
- Jean-Philippe Rameau – Nélée et Myrthis, RCT 50

== Births ==
- April 6 – Louis de Cahusac, librettist (died 1759)
- April 24 – Giovanni Battista Martini, violinist, harpsichordist and composer (died 1784)
- September 20 – Franz Johann Habermann, church musician and composer (died 1783)
- October 18 – Baldassare Galuppi, composer best known for his operas (died 1785)
- November 7 – Carlo Cecere, composer (died 1761)
- December – William Hayes, composer and organist (died 1777)

== Deaths ==
- February – Frances Purcell, widow of Henry Purcell
- March 3 – Johann Pachelbel, composer (born 1653)
- June 30 – Jacques Boyvin, French organist and composer (born c.1649)
- October 26 – Andreas Werckmeister, organist and composer (born 1645)
- December 2 – Johann Georg Ahle, organist and composer (born 1651)
- date unknown – Flavio Carlo Lanciani, opera composer (born 1667)
