= Giuseppe Ottavio Pitoni =

Italian composer

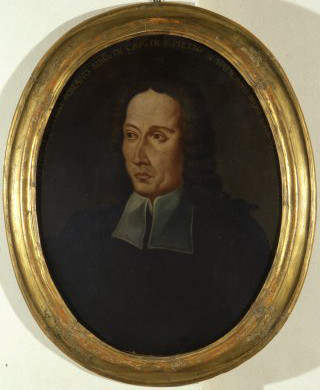
Giuseppe Ottavio Pittoni

Giuseppe Ottavio Pitoni (Rieti, 18 March 1657 – Rome, Papal States, 1 February 1743) was an Italian organist and composer. He became one of the leading musicians in Rome during the late Baroque era, the first half of the 18th century.

== Life ==
Born in Rieti, his family moved to Rome when he was an infant. He began vocal study with Pompeo Natali at the age of five and sang in the choir of San Giovanni dei Fiorentini from age eight. At Santi Apostoli he sang and studied counterpoint with Francesco Foggia, where his early compositions were performed. By age sixteen he was maestro di cappella at Santa Maria Maggiore, Monterotondo, a historic church near Rome. In 1673 as maestro for the cathedral at Assisi he began intensive study of the works of Palestrina, and in 1676 moved to the cathedral at Rieti.

In 1677 he returned to Rome for a lifelong appointment as maestro di cappella at the Basilica of San Marco. In addition he held a series of prestigious positions as maestro for Basilica dei Santi Apostoli, Rome (from 1686), at St. John Lateran (from 1708, where Palestrina had served from 1555 to 1560), and for the Cappella Giulia at St. Peter’s (from 1719, immediately following Domenico Scarlatti), and maestro di cappella at the Collegium Germanicum in Rome. For the chapter of San Lorenzo in Damaso, he produced major performances over thirty-five years for the music-loving Cardinal Pietro Ottoboni, whose extensive circle of artists included Arcangelo Corelli, George Frideric Handel, both Alessandro and Domenico Scarlatti, Bernardo Pasquini, and Filippo Amadei.

== Works ==
His contributions to liturgical music in Rome were profound as composer, organist, maestro di capella, writer on music theory and history, and as esaminatori dei maestri for the Academy of St. Cecilia. He was extremely prolific, with some 325 masses, 800 Psalm settings and 235 motets among the 3500 compositions listed by his pupil and biographer, Girolamo Chiti. He prepared a complete year of music for St. Peter’s, with settings for the masses and offices of every Sunday and holy day.

Pitoni’s early works are brilliant examples of his genius in the Roman contrapuntal style of Palestrina. In later years he moved toward more homophonic textures with polychoral elements. His use of stile concertato also included solo sections and concertante instrumental parts. It is said that his immense facility allowed him to compose the parts of a 16-voice mass separately, without use of a score. To modern ears and eyes these compositions may seem dull and even repetitious. However, given typical performance practices in the early 18th century – vocal ornamentation ("divisions"), instrumental participation, antiphonal location for polychoral elements, just intonation, and varied vocal colors – even the homophonic works must have made a strong impression in the highly reverberative church interiors of Rome. At the end of his life he was preparing a mass for twelve choirs, left incomplete at his death. He was buried in the Pitoni family vault in the Basilica of San Marco, where he had served for some 66 years. His best known work is the Dixit Dominus a 16 in 4 choirs.

== Music theory ==
Guida armonica … libro primo (Rome, c1690); ed. F. Luisi (Bologna, 1989) Notitia de contrapuntisti e de compositori di musica (c1725); ed. C. Ruini (Florence, 1988) Regole di contrappunto (Mss Rome, Conservatorio di Musica S Cecilia) Aggiunte alle Regole di contrappunto di Giulio Belli (Mss Bologna, Civico Museo Bibliografico Musicale)

== Works, editions and recordings ==
Several volumes of his unpublished autograph compositions are in the library of the Cappella Giulia, Rome, and the Bibliotheca Santini at Münster.

- Cantate Domino
- Laudate Dominum
- Dixit Dominus Tölzer Knabenchor Gerhard Schmidt-Gaden

== Sources ==
- Chisholm, Hugh, ed. (1911). "Pitoni, Giuseppe Ottavio" . Encyclopædia Britannica. Vol. 21 (11th ed.). Cambridge University Press. p. 667.
- Grove, George, ed. (1900). "Pitoni, Giuseppe" . A Dictionary of Music and Musicians. London: Macmillan and Company.
- Herbermann, Charles, ed. (1912). "Joseph Pitoni" . Catholic Encyclopedia. Vol. 13. New York: Robert Appleton Company.
- Oxford Music Online
