= Francesco Antonio Bonporti =

Italian composer (1672–1749)

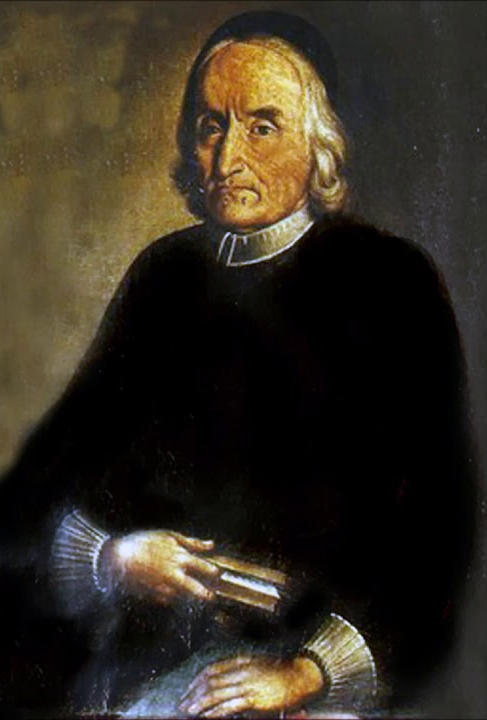
Francesco Antonio Bonporti

Francesco Antonio Bonporti (11 June 1672 – 19 December 1749) was an Italian priest and amateur composer.

Born in Trento, he was admitted in 1691 to the Collegium Germanicum in Rome, where he studied theology. While in Rome, he also studied composition under the guidance of Giuseppe Ottavio Pitoni and possibly (since this is unconfirmed) violin with Arcangelo Corelli.

Moving back to Trento, he was ordained in 1695.

Bonporti's musical work consists of twelve opera, published between 1696 and 1736. He influenced Johann Sebastian Bach in the development of the invention, and several of his works were mistakenly included in a set of Bach's inventions. In reality, Bach had transcribed for harpsichord four violin pieces from Bonporti's op. X (1712).

He lived in Padua from 1740 until his death in 1749.

== Works ==
This is a listing of his twelve opera, first the Italian original, generally by Giuseppe Sala in Venice, then the French edition as published by Estienne Roger in Amsterdam, and finally the English edition, by John Walsh in London. Not every opus seem to have survived in all three languages, as listed in an article published by Studi Trentini in 1973 by Clemente Lunelli. His sources on European editions are François Lesure's Bibliographie des éditions musicales publiées par Estienne Roger..., Paris, 1969, and William C. Smith's A bibliography of the musical works published by John Walsh..., London, 1968.

- Op. 1 Suonate a Tre. Due violini, e violoncello obligato..., 1696. Four parts.
  - Antoine Bomporti Gentilhomme di Trento opera prima, Sonate à tre, due Violini, Violoncello e basso continuo. N. 101, 1706, f. 4.0
- Op. 2
  - Antonio Bomporti di Trento, opera seconda, Sonate da Camera à tre, due Violini e Basso continuo. N. 292, 1701, f. 3.10
  - Bonporti's Sonata or Chamber Aires in three Parts for two Violins and a Through Bass compos'd by Francisco Antonio Bomporti Opera Seconda (...) N. 266, c. 1708
  - Bomporti's Sonata or Chamber Aires (...) Opera Seconda. (...), N. 482, c. 1715
- op. 3 Motetti a canto solo, con violini (...), 1702. Five parts.
- op. 4
  - Antonio Bomporti Opera Quarta, Sonate da Camera à tre, due Violini e basso continuo, N. 38, 1706, f. 40
  - Bomporti's Sonata or Chamber Aires (...) Opera Quarto (sic) (...), N. 267, c. 1708
- op. 5 Arie, baletti e correnti c. 1704 (not extant)
- op. 6
  - Antonio Bomporti, opera sexta, Sonate da Camera à tre, due Violini e basso continuo, N. 38, 1706, f. 4.0
- op. 7
  - Bomporti opera settima sonate à Violino solo e basso continuo, N. 303, c. 1707-1708, f. 3.0
  - 10 Solos by Bomporti for a Violin and a Bass, (Walsh, P. Randall, J. Hare) N. 277d, 1708
  - (?)Bomportis Solos, for a Violin and a Bass, 4s. od., (Walsh) N. 603, c. 1720 or earlier
- op. 8 (given as lost)
  - Antonio Bomporti opera ottava, le Triomphe de la grande Aliance à Violon et basse continue, N. 120, c. 1708-1712, f. 2.0; also mentioned as Le Triomphe de la grande Aliance, consistent en cent Menuets, composez par Mr. Bomporti opera VIII
- op. 9
  - Bomporti opera nona, Baletti à Violino solo e basso continuo, N. 413, f. 1.0; after 1716
- op. 10 Invenzioni a violino solo del (...), Venice-Trento, Giovanni Parone, 1713. Partiture.
  - Bomporti opera dècima inventione a Violino solo, e basso contin. (La Pace), N. 404, c. 1712-1715, f. 4.0
- op. 11 Concerti a quattro, due violini, alto viola, e basso con violino di rinforzo Trento, Giambattista Monauni, circa 1715. Five parts
- op. 12 Concertini e serenate con arie variate, siciliane, recitativi, e chiuse a violino, e violoncello, o cembalo, Habsburg, Johann Christian Leopold. Partiture.
- Aria cromatica, e variata a violino violoncello, e cembalo..., manuscript in the library of the Bruxelles conservatoire, dated 1720. Partiture.
- Sonata di Buonporti, manuscript, same as above. Two parts.
- Six Sonate à deux Flutes et Basse continue, composées par Bomporti et transposées sur la Flute par Corbet, N. 65, c. 1707-1708, f. 3.0

== Bibliography ==
Franco Ballardini, Storia e storiografia: il caso Bonporti, in Musica e società nella storia trentina, a cura di Rossana Dalmonte, Trento UCT 1994, pp. 281-306 https://www.academia.edu/113815352/Storia_e_storiografia_il_caso_Bonporti.

Antonio Carlini, Francesco Antonio Bonporti, Gentilhuomo di Trento – La vita e l'opera con catalogo tematico, Edizioni de I Solisti Veneti, Padova, 2000, ISBN.

AA.VV., Bonporti oggi - Studi e ricerche su Francesco Antonio Bonporti a 250 anni dalla morte, Quaderni del Conservatorio "F. A. Bonporti", Trento, 2002 https://conservatorio.tn.it/wp-content/uploads/2015/12/Bonporti-oggi-2002-atti-convegno-1999.pdf.
