= Wilhelmsburg Castle =

- Schloss Wilhelmsburg
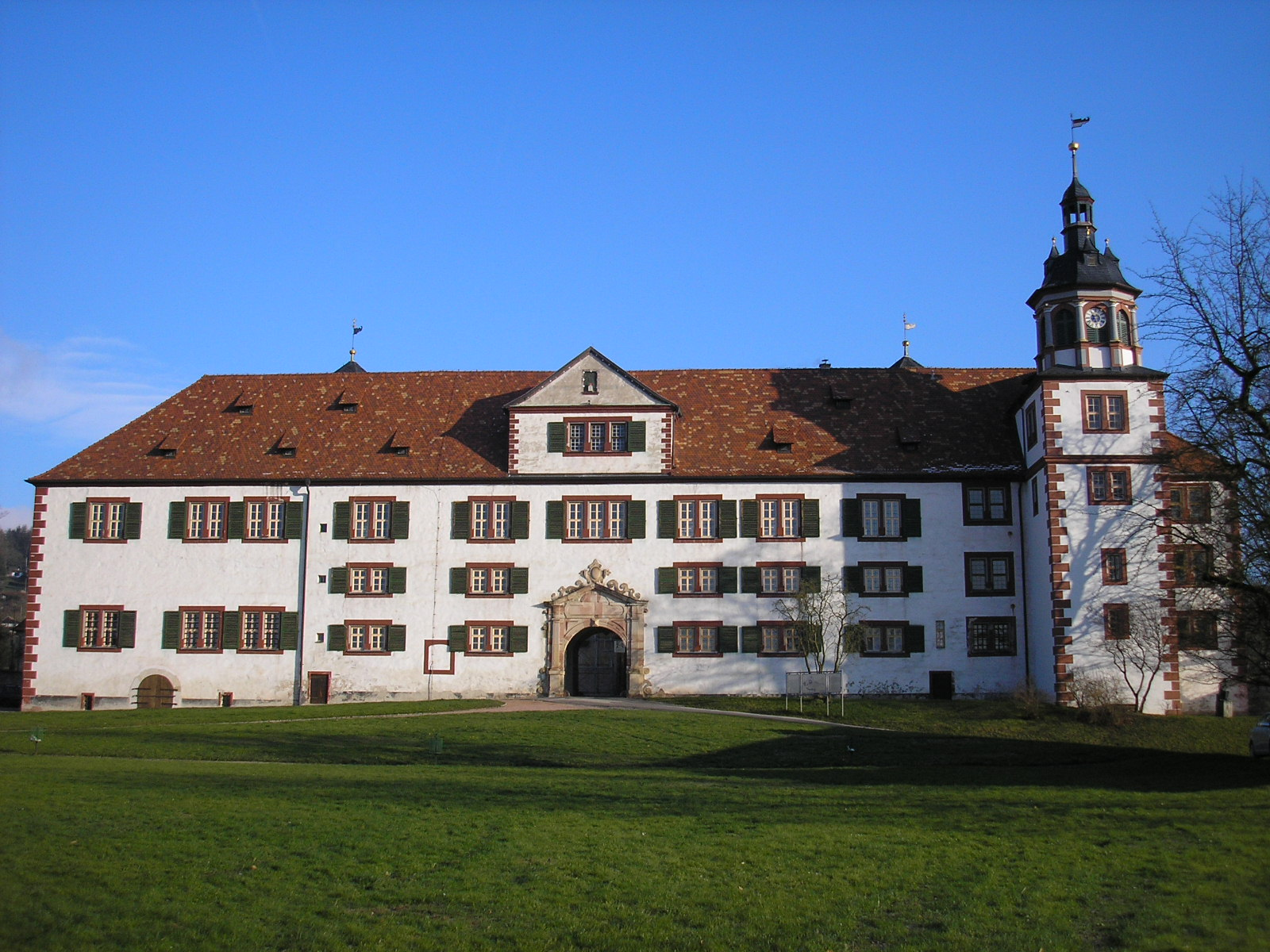
- Southwest facade of the castle
- Interactive map of the Wilhelmsburg Castle area

General information
- Location: Schmalkalden, Germany
- Coordinates: 50°43′23″N 10°27′21″E
- Construction started: 1584
- Completed: 1618
- Inaugurated: 23 May 1590

The Wilhelmsburg Castle in the city of Schmalkalden was a secondary residence of the Landgraves of Hesse. It is one of the most important Renaissance buildings in central Germany, which has experienced no structural changes to this day and is preserved in almost its original condition.

== History ==
In 1583, the Landgrave of Hesse-Kassel became the sole owner of the Lordship of Schmalkalden, which had been shared with the Counts of Henneberg until then. Landgrave William IV immediately decided to make the city one of his secondary residences. He had the 12th Century Waltaff Castle demolished and began the construction of the castle named after him on the same location. The castle was inaugurated on 23 May 1590, although it had not yet been completed. The interior was procured from Kassel. William's son Maurice often stayed at Wilhelmsburg castle. During his reign, the castle was finally completed in 1618. His successors used the castle less and less and in the early 19th Century the castle was abandoned altogether. In 1873, the Association for Henneberg History and Geography purchased the castle and began using it as a museum.

== Building ==
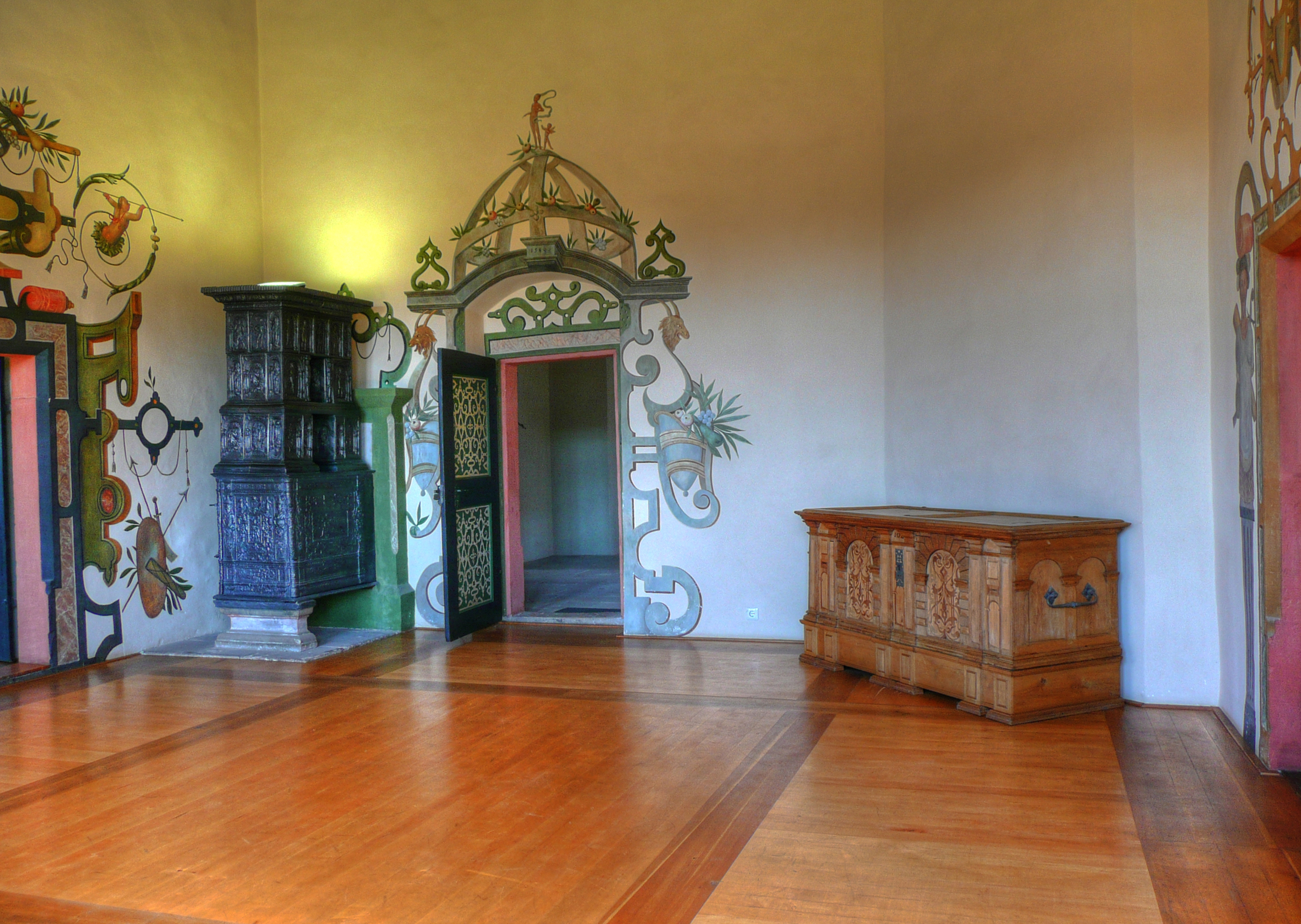
One of the many indoor spaces

The palace is a four-winged structure with a nearly square floor plan. The comprehensive facilities include an outdoor parade grounds, a gatekeeper's house, pleasure gardens, a kitchen garden, a prison tower, stables, a bakery and a brewery. The spatial arrangement is typical for a residential palace. The halls were decorated with scrollwork and strapwork and adorned with decorative paintings, including a copy of the Iwein epos by Hartmann von Aue the basement.

Located on the City Palace is a four-winged structure with a nearly square floor plan. The comprehensive facilities include outdoor parade ground, gatekeepers house, pleasure gardens, kitchen garden, prison tower, stables and bakery and brewery. The spatial arrangement corresponds to a representative of the Royal Palace. The halls were labeled with Roll - equipped and strapwork, just as they are adorned with decorative paintings - which includes a copy of the Iwein epic in Hartmann von Aue the basement.

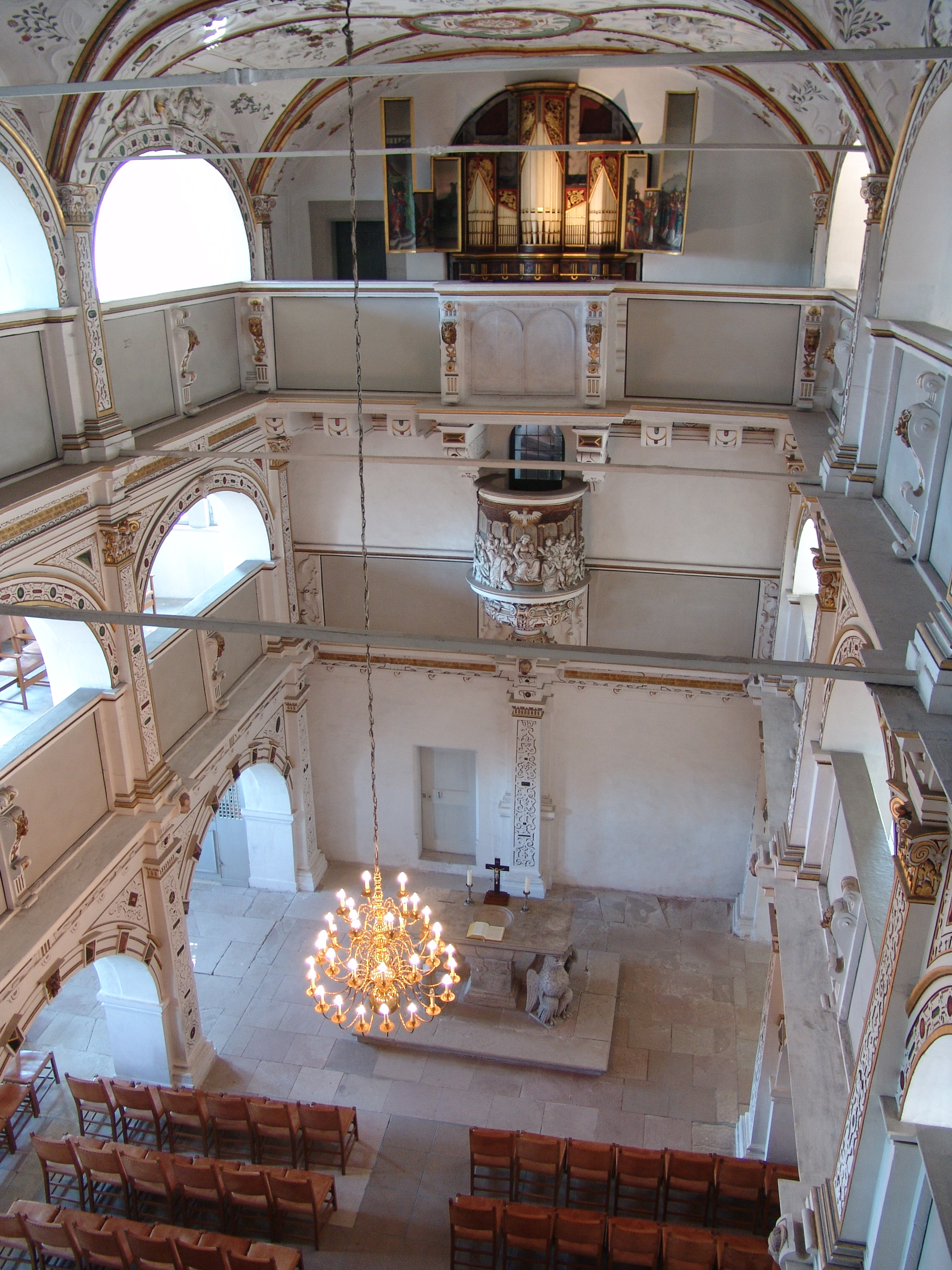
Interior of the castle church

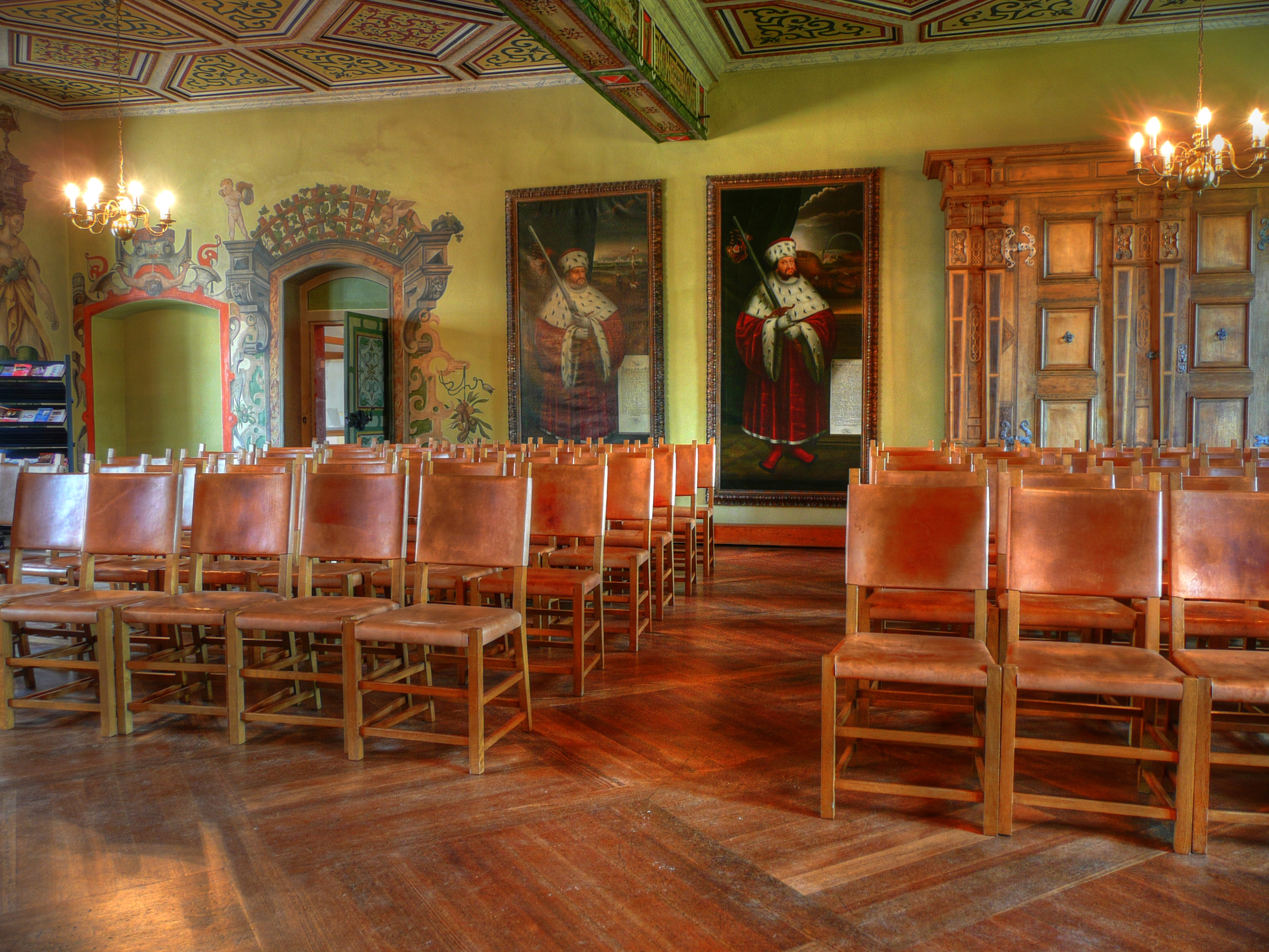
Ballroom

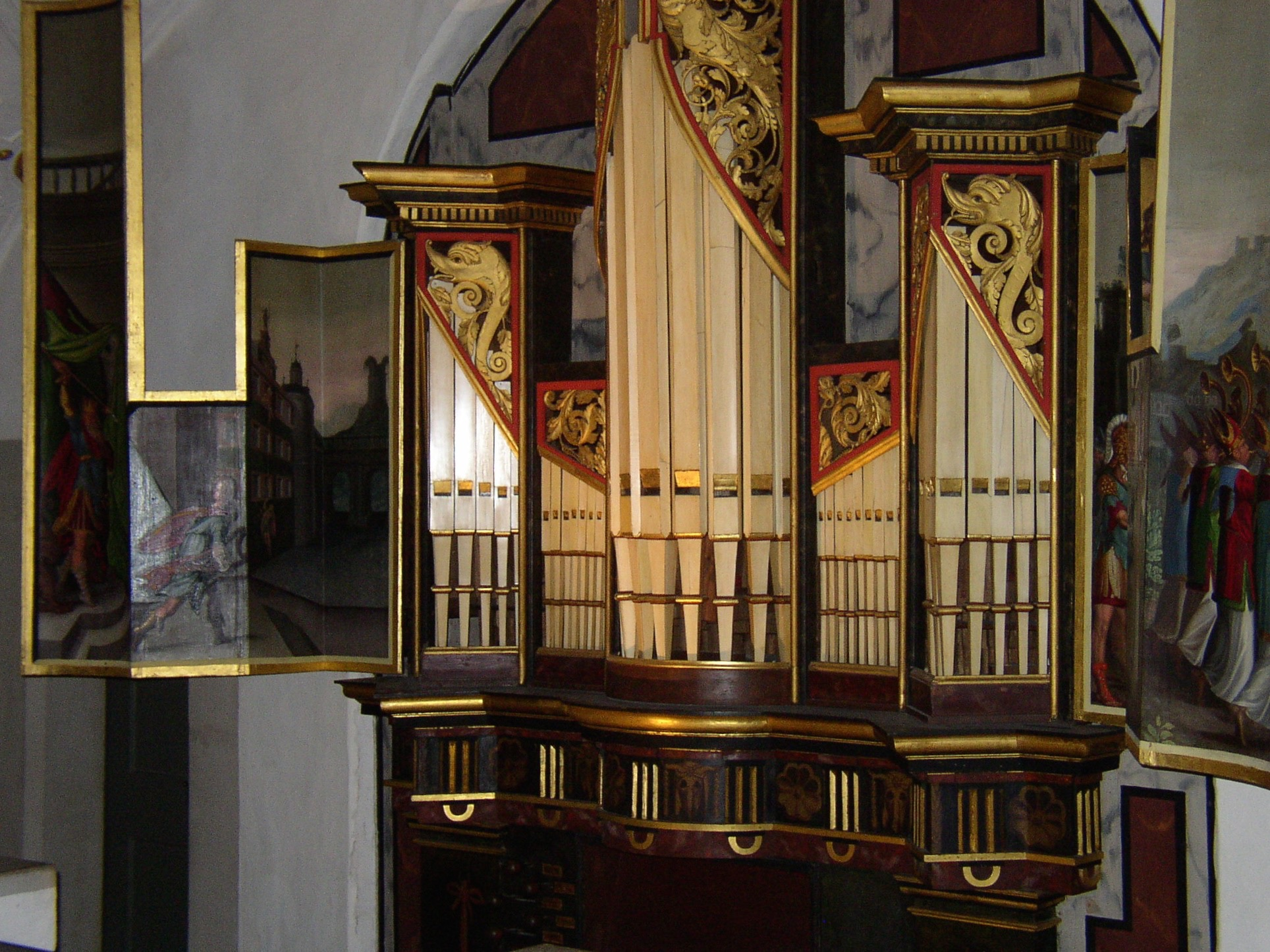
Renaissance organ

The magnificent castle church, built by Dutch architect Willem Vernukken in 1590, is one of the oldest and most beautiful newly built Protestant churches in Germany. Many German Lutheran churches of the 18th century followed its example with the connection of altar with baptismal font, pulpit and organ in a vertical axis; central paintings above the altar were replaced with pulpits.

== Organ ==
The Renaissance organ in the chapel is one of the oldest instruments of this kind in Central Europe that is still playable. It was commissioned by Landgrave William IV and built by Daniel Meyer in Göttingen. The organ receives its special timbre from 252 wooden pipes, six registers and its so-called bird cry. It was played for the first time on 23 May 1590 when the castle church was consecrated during the inauguration of the castle.

== Museum ==
The castle houses the permanent exhibition Dawn of a new era, with the main topics Renaissance, Reformation and Schmalkaldic League.

== See also ==
- Renaissance architecture
- Northern Renaissance
- The Reformation and its influence on church architecture
