= 1702 in music =

The year 1702 in music involved some significant events.

== Events ==
- 13 March – A month after commencing his university education, 17-year-old George Frideric Handel accepts the position of organist at Halle Cathedral, replacing J. C. Leporin, for whom he had acted as assistant.
- Johann Sebastian Bach concludes his musical education at St. Michael's School in Lüneburg.
- Georg Philipp Telemann becomes director of Leipzig opera, and founds Leipzig Collegium Musicum.
- Alessandro Scarlatti leaves Naples and seeks the patronage of Prince Ferdinando de' Medici.
- Michel de Saint-Lambert publishes Les principes du clavecin.
- Probable year – German Baroque composer Jakob Greber moves from Italy to London – accompanied by his mistress, operatic soprano Margherita de L'Épine – where he will remain for three years composing incidental music for plays and arias for L'Épine, including those for this year's première of Nicholas Rowe's play The Fair Penitent.

== Published popular music ==
- Tavern Bilkers, burlesque by John Weaver

== Classical music ==
- Giovanni Henrico Albicastro – Sonate a violino solo col basso continuo
- Tomaso Albinoni
  - Lontananza crudel, mi squarci il core, T.204.04 (Op. 4)
  - Poiché al vago seren di due pupille, T.205
- Friedrich Nicolaus Brauns – St John Passion (formerly attributed to Reinhard Keiser)
- Marc-Antoine Charpentier
  - Extremum Dei judicium, H.401
  - Judicium Salomonis, performed for the opening of the French parliament
- François Couperin
  - Quatre versets d'un motet composé et chanté par ordre du roy
  - Qui dat nivem sicut lanam
- Johann Caspar Ferdinand Fischer
  - Ariadne musica
  - Tafelmusik
- Louis Marchand – Pièces de clavecin, Livre 1
- James Paisible
  - 6 Sonatas of Two Parts
  - Airs for the play King Edward the Third
  - Airs for the comedy She Would and She Would Not
- Alessandro Scarlatti – Mottetti sacri ad una, due, trè, e quattro voci con violini
- Francesco Scarlatti – Dixit dominus (Psalm 110)
- Johannes Schenck – Le nymphe di Rheno, 12 sonatas and suites for 2 violas da gamba, Op. 8 (Amsterdam)
- Johann Speth – Ars Magna Consoni et Dissoni
- Francisco Valls – Missa Scala Aretina
- Friedrich Wilhelm Zachow – Danksaget dem Vater

== Opera ==
- François Bouvard – Médus
- André Campra – Tancrède
- Pietro Torri – Torneo

== Births ==
- January 6 – José de Nebra, composer (died 1768)
- February 7 – Carl August Thielo, composer (died 1763)
- February 27 – Johann Valentin Görner, composer (died 1762)
- March 5 – Michael Mietke II, German harpsichord maker (died 1754)
- March 13 – Burkat Shudi, Swiss-born harpsichord maker (died 1773)
- March 27 – Johann Ernst Eberlin, composer (died 1762)
- July 22 – Alessandro Besozzi, oboist and composer (died 1793)

== Deaths ==
- July 6 – Nicolas Lebègue, French harpsichordist, composer and organist (born 1632)
- July 16 – Étienne Loulié, musician, pedagogue and musical theorist (born 1654)
- September 17 – Olaus Rudbeck, composer (born 1630)
- December – José de Cascante, organist and composer (born 1646)
