= 1703 in music =

The year 1703 in music involved some significant events.

== Events ==
- January – Johann Sebastian Bach is appointed court musician in the chapel of Duke Johann Ernst III in Weimar, his first such professional appointment, although probably including menial duties.
- by July – George Frideric Handel takes a position as violinist and harpsichordist in the orchestra of the Hamburg Oper am Gänsemarkt.
- 14 August – J. S. Bach accepts the post of organist at the New Church, Arnstadt.
- September – Antonio Vivaldi, newly ordained as a priest, is appointed maestro di violino (master of violin) at the Ospedale della Pietà orphanage in Venice, for which he begins teaching and composing.
- ca. December – Alessandro Scarlatti becomes maestro di cappella at Santa Maria Maggiore in Rome.
- Nicolas Bernier publishes his first cantatas, the earliest in the French language.

== Classical music ==
- Henricus Albicastro – 6 Violin Sonatas, Op.5
- Johann Sebastian Bach
  - Concerto and Fugue in C minor, BWV 909
  - Denket doch, ihr Menschenkinder, BWV 1122
  - Wo Gott zum Haus nicht gibt sein Gunst, BWV 1123
  - Ich ruf zu dir, Herr Jesu Christ, BWV 1124
  - O Gott, du frommer Gott, BWV 1125
- Giovanni Bononcini – Proteo sul Reno
- Sébastien de Brossard
  - Abraham ou le sacrifice d'Isaac
  - Judith ou la mort d'Holopherne
- Antonio Caldara – La castità al cimento
- André Campra – Motets, Livre 3
- Gaspard Corrette – Messe du 8e Ton pour l’Orgue
- François Couperin – Quatre versets d'un motet (sacred music)
- George Frideric Handel – Keyboard Sonata in C major, HWV 577
- Christian Liebe – Machet die Tore weit
- Louis Marchand – Pièces de clavecin, Livre 2
- James Paisible - Six sonatas of two parts for two flutes, Op. 1
- Andrew Parcham – Recorder Sonata in G major
- Alessandro Scarlatti – S. Casimiro, re di Polonia
- Andreas Heinrich Schultze – 6 Recorder Sonatas

== Opera ==
- Antonio Caldara
  - Farnace
  - Gli equivoci del sembiante
- Francesco Gasparini – Amor della patria
- Antonio Quintavalle – Il trionfo d'amore
- Domenico Scarlatti – Il Giustino

== Musical theater ==
- William Corbett – As You Find It

== Births ==
- 20 January – Joseph-Hector Fiocco, composer and violinist (died 1741)
- 29 January – Carlmann Kolb, priest, organist and composer (died 1765)
- date unknown
  - Jean-Marie Leclair the younger, composer (died 1777)
  - John Frederick Lampe, musician (died 1751)
  - John Travers, organist and composer (died 1758)
  - Johann Gottlieb Graun, German Baroque/Classical era composer and violinist (died 1771)

== Deaths ==
- March 31 – Johann Christoph Bach, organist and composer (born 1642)
- September 14 – Gilles Jullien, composer and organist (born 1639)
- October 3 – Alessandro Melani, composer (b. 1639)
- November 30 – Nicolas de Grigny, organist and composer (born 1672)
- probable – Jacek Różycki, composer (born c.1635)
