= Louis-Antoine Dornel =

French composer, harpsichordist, organist and violinist (1680-1757)

Louis-Antoine Dornel (30 March 1680 in Presles, Val-d'Oise near (Beaumont-sur-Oise) – 22 July 1757) was a French composer, harpsichordist, organist and violinist.

== Biography ==
Dornel was probably taught by the organist Nicolas Lebègue. He was appointed organist at the church of Sainte-Marie-Madeleine-en-la-Cité in 1706, where he took over from François d'Agincourt. He was runner-up in the competition for the post to Jean-Philippe Rameau, who eventually refused the terms set by the church authorities. He occupied several organist posts in Paris over a period from 1714 to 1748. In 1719 he was appointed to the abbey of Sainte-Geneviève, following the death of André Raison.

From 1725 to 1742, Dornel was appointed successor to du Boussetto as the music master of the Académie Française. He was required to compose a large-scale motet for choir and orchestra to be performed by the Académie each year on the feast of Saint Louis (August 25), but none survive. Dornel's works for harpsichord and for organ were well regarded at the time, the Mercure de France stating that they were "fort estimées et de très facile exécution" (well regarded and easy to play).

We know little more about the rest of his career, other than that his last surviving organ manuscript is dated 1756. A hand written inscription on the cover gives his birth and death date as 1691 and 1765.

As Dornel was not a salaried court musician, he had to respond to the tastes of the concert societies set up by the French aristocracy, and in particular to the popularity of the sonata form promoted by the Italian-educated Marc-Antoine Charpentier, as well as traditional suites of French dances.

== Works ==
His surviving work includes:

- four books of chamber music - Livre de simphonies contenant six suites en trio avec une sonate en quatuor (1709), Sonates à violon seul et suites pour la flûte traversière avec la basse (1711), Sonates en trio pour les flûtes allemandes, violons, hautbois (1713), and Concerts de simphonies (1723);
- a collection of pieces for harpsichord (1731) filled with pieces of character - miniature movements with evocative titles beloved by the bourgeoisie as made popular by Couperin;
- vocal music entitled airs sérieux, published by Ballard in 1706;
- four cantatas, and a series of unpublished organ pieces.

He was also author of a book of music theory published 1745: Le tour du clavier sur tous les tons.

== Dornel organ pieces ==
A series of unpublished organ pieces (c. 1756) survive in manuscript (Bibliothèque Ste-Geneviève, Paris), and were published by Norbert Dufourcq in 1965 (ed. Schola Cantorum, Paris).

== See also ==
- List of French harpsichordists
- French organ school
