= 1704 in music =

The year 1704 in music involved some significant events.

== Events ==
- Johann Christoph Pepusch arrives in London.
- Following her husband's death, Elisabeth-Claude Jacquet de la Guerre begins hosting concerts in her home.
- Antonio Vivaldi becomes general superintendent of music at the Ospedale della Pietà, Venice.
- Johann Jacob Bach becomes an oboist in the army of King Charles XII of Sweden, inspiring Johann Sebastian to write a Capriccio on the Absence of His Most Beloved Brother.
- During a performance of Johann Mattheson's opera Cleopatra, the composer almost kills his friend, Georg Frideric Handel, in a violent quarrel.

== Classical music ==
- Henricus Albicastro – [12] Concerti, Op.7
- Attilo Ariosti – La madre dei Maccabei
- Johann Sebastian Bach
  - Nach dir, Herr, verlanget mich, BWV 150 (or 1707)
  - Toccata and Fugue D Minor BWV 565 (poss.)
  - Ach Herr, mich armen Sünder, BWV 742
  - Sonata in D major, BWV 963
  - Capriccio in B-flat major, BWV 992
- Antonio Caldara – Il trionfo dell'innocenza (Second edition)
- Louis-Nicolas Clérambault – Livre de pièces de clavecin
- François Couperin – 7 Versets du motet composé de l'ordre du roy, 1704
- William Croft – 6 Sonatas of Two Parts
- Michel Richard Delalande – Dominus regnavit, S.65
- George Frideric Handel – Oboe Concerto in G minor, HWV 287
- Reinhard Keiser – Der blutige und sterbende Jesus (by Christian Friedrich Hunold)
- Michele Mascitti – [12] Sonate, Op.1
- Jean-Baptiste Morin – Motets à une et deux voix, Livre I
- James Paisible – Musick perform'd before Her Majesty and the new King of Spain
- Alessandro Scarlatti
  - Perdono, Amor, perdono, H.554
  - S. Casimiro, re di Pononia
- Johann Schenck – 2 Sonatas for 2 Viols
- Giovanni Battista Tibaldi – 12 Trio Sonatas, Op.2

== Opera ==
- Attilo Ariosti – I gloriosi presagi di Scipione Africano
- Giovanni Bononcini
  - Il fiore delle eroine
  - Il ritorno di Giulio Cesare
- Francesco Bartolomeo Conti – Alba Cornelia
- Johann Mattheson – Die unglückselige Cleopatra
- Carlo Francesco Pollarolo – Irene (revised by Domenico Scarlatti for performance at Naples).

== Births ==
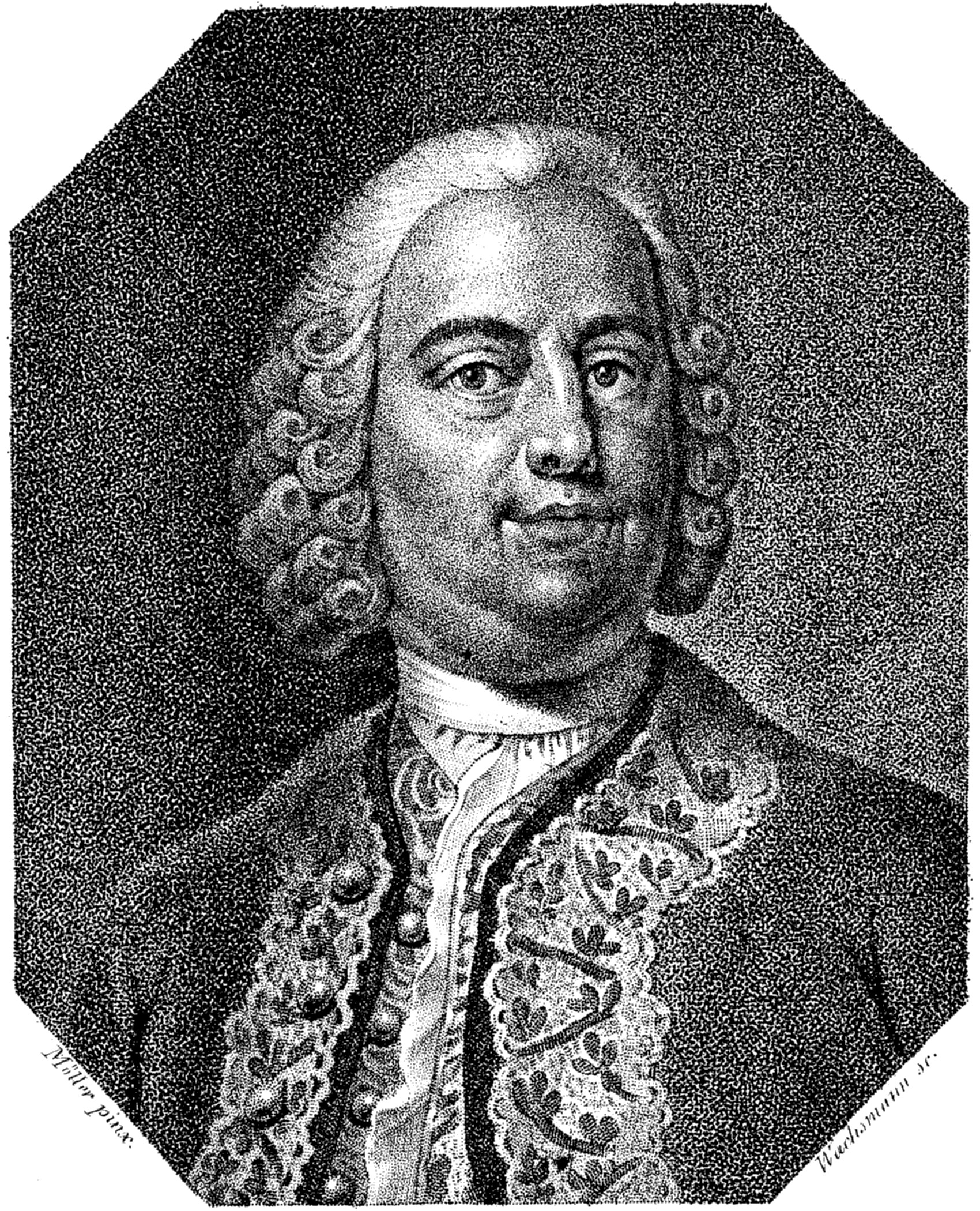
Carl Heinrich Graun

- May 7 – Carl Heinrich Graun, composer and singer (died 1759)
- June 11 – Carlos Seixas, composer (died 1742)
- October 2 – František Tůma, organist and composer (died 1774)
- December 31 – Carl Gotthelf Gerlach, organist (died 1761)
- probable – Claude Parisot, organ builder (died 1784)

== Deaths ==
- February 7 – Lady Mary Dering, composer (born 1629)
- February 23 – Georg Muffat, composer (born 1653)
- February 24 – Marc-Antoine Charpentier, composer (born 1643)
- February 25 – Isabella Leonarda, composer of church music (born 1620)
- April – Georg Christoph Strattner, friend and colleague of Bach at Lüneburg (born c. 1644)
- May 3 – Heinrich Ignaz Biber, violinist and composer (born 1644)
- September 6 – Francesco Provenzale, composer (born 1624)
- November 2 – Johann Jakob Walther, violinist and composer (born 1650)
- November 16 – Chikka Devaraja, ruler of Mysore, composer and music theorist (born 1673)
- December 14
  - Selim I Giray, Crimean khan, also known as a poet and musician (born 1631)
  - Joseph-François Duché de Vancy, librettist (born 1668)
