= 1705 in music =

The year 1705 in music involved some significant events.

== Events ==
- Johann Sebastian Bach travels to Lübeck to hear Dieterich Buxtehude perform.
- Alessandro Scarlatti notes that he has written 88 operas in the past 23 years.
- William Croft marries Mary George.
- Jean-Féry Rebel joins Les Vingt-quatre Violons du Roi.
- The earliest fandango melody is recorded in the anonymous Libro de diferentes cifras de guitarra.

== Classical music ==
- Johann Michael Bach – Gelobet seist du, Jesu Christ (formerly attributed to JS Bach, BWV 723)
- Johann Sebastian Bach
  - Prelude and Fugue in E minor, BWV 533
  - Prelude and Fugue in G minor, BWV 535a
  - Prelude and Fugue in C minor, BWV 549
  - Prelude in G major, BWV 568
  - Prelude in A minor, BWV 569
  - Fantasia in C major, BWV 570
  - Wie schön leuchtet der Morgenstern, BWV 739
  - Suite in A minor, BWV 818
  - Overture in F major, BWV 820
  - Suite in G minor, BWV 822
  - Sonata in A minor, BWV 965
  - Sonata in C major, BWV 966
  - Sonata in A minor, BWV 967
- Friedrich Nicolaus Brauns – St Mark Passion (formerly attributed to Reinhard Keiser)
- Sébastien de Brossard – Samson trahi par Dalila
- Dietrich Buxtehude – Prelude in G minor, BuxWV 150
- Antonio Caldara – Kyrie in A minor
- François Campion – Nouvelles découvertes Sur la Guitarre
- François Couperin
  - Mottets à voix seule, deux et trois parties et symphonies
  - 7 Versets du motet composé de l'ordre du roy, 1705
- Michel Richard Delalande – Mottets de Monsieur de La Lande
- Jean Gilles – Requiem
- George Frideric Handel
  - Chaconne in G major, HWV 442
  - Air in A major, HWV 468
  - Gavotte in G major, HWV 491
- Johann Kuhnau – Gott sei mir gnädig
- Gaspard Le Roux – Pièces de clavessin
- Antonio Lotti – Duetti, terzetti, e madrigali a più voci
- Johann Pachelbel – Toccata in C major, P.455-6
- Bernardo Pascoli – Moteti sagri a voce sola..., Op. 1
- John Christopher Pepusch – 6 Record Sonatas, Op.1
- Alessandro Scarlatti – Solitudini amene, bersaglio d'empia sorte, H.664
- Georg Philipp Telemann – Ich hebe meine Augen auf zu den Bergen, TWV 7:17
- Antonio Vivaldi – 12 Trio Sonatas, Op.1

== Opera ==
The following operas were composed:

- Tomaso Albinoni – L'Eraclea
- Antonio Caldara – L'Arminia
- Thomas Clayton, Nicola Haym, & Charles Dieupart – Arsinoe, Queen of Cyprus, produced at the Drury Lane Theatre in London
- Francesco Gasparini
  - Ambleto
  - Antioco
- George Frideric Handel – Almira, premièred in Hamburg
- Reinhard Keiser – Octavia (or Die römische Unruhe, oder Die edelmühtige Octavia)
- Alessandro Scarlatti
  - Alle Troiane antenne, H.30
  - Il Sedecia, re di Gerusalemme

== Theoretical Writings ==
- Jacques Boyvin – Traité abrégé de l’Accompagnement
- Johann Peter Sperling – Principia Musicæ

== Births ==
- De: Johann Elias Bach January 24 – Farinelli, celebrated castrato (died 1782)
- February 20 – Nicolas Chédeville, composer, musette player and maker (died 1782)
- September 19 – Marguerite-Antoinette Couperin, French harpsichordist (died 1778)
- September 28 – Johann Peter Kellner, organist and composer (died 1772)
- November 5 – Louis-Gabriel Guillemain, composer and violinist (died 1770)
- November 29 – Michael Christian Festing, violinist and composer (died 1752)
- date unknown
  - Louis Archimbaud, organist and composer (died 1789)
  - Nicola Sabatino, composer (died 1796)
- probable – Joseph-Nicolas-Pancrace Royer, composer and harpsichordist (died 1755)

== Deaths ==
- February – Pierre Beauchamp, dancer, choreographer and composer (born 1631)
- February 5 – Jean Gilles, composer (born 1668)
- June 13 – Nicholas Staggins, composer, Master of the King's Musick
- April 17 – Johann Paul von Westhoff, violinist and composer (born 1656)
- December 1 – Jeremiah Clarke, composer (born c. 1674)
- probable – Giovanni Battista Rogeri, luthier (born c. 1650)
