= 1701 in music =

The year 1701 in music involved some significant musical events and new works.

== Events ==
- Georg Philipp Telemann matriculates in law at the University of Leipzig. In the same year, he meets George Frideric Handel for the first time.
- Founding of the Slovenian Philharmonic Society (orchestra)
- In a competition held in Dorset Gardens, London, for the best musical setting of the masque 'The Judgement of Paris' by William Congreve, John Weldon emerges victorious, with John Eccles second and Daniel Purcell third.
- The semi-opera Acis and Galatea, with music by John Eccles and text by Peter Anthony Motteux, is staged in London.
- Domenico Scarlatti is appointed organist and composer of the vice-regal court in Naples

== Published popular music ==
- "Captain Kidd"

== Classical music ==
- Domenico Sarro - Di tre Dee su l’Ida
- Giovanni Henrico Albicastro – XII Suonate a tre, due violini et violoncello col basso per l'organo
- Tomaso Albinoni – 12 Balletti de Camera, Op. 3
- Carlo Ambrogio Lonati – 12 Violin Sonatas
- Giovanni Bononcini
  - La conversione di Maddalena
  - Duetti da camera, Op.8
- Michel Richard Delalande – Venite exultemus Domino, S.58
- Charles Dieupart – 6 Suittes
- Gottfried Finger – 10 Recorder Sonatas, Op.3
- Johann Joseph Fux – Concentus Musico-Instrumentalis, Op.1
- Louis Heudelinne – 3 Suites, Livre 1
- Giuseppe Maria Jacchini – Concerti per camera a 3. e 4. strumenti, Op.4
- Marin Marais
  - Domine salvum fac regem (lost)
  - Pièces de viole, Livre II
- Carlo Antonio Marino – 12 Sonatas, Op.6
- Georg Muffat
  - "Auserlesene Instrumentalmusik" (Selected Instrumental Music)
  - Exquisitioris harmoniae instrumentalis gravi-jucundae
- Sybrandus van Noordt – Sonate per il cimbalo appropriate al flauto & violino
- Johann Christoph Pez – 12 Sonatas 'Duplex Genius', Op.1
- Michelangelo Rossi – Toccata No.14 in C major
- Alessandro Scarlatti – Tu sei quella che al nome, H.743
- Domenico Scarlatti – Antra, valles, divo plaudant montes colles
- Johann Schenck – Scherzi musicali, Op.6
- George Philipp Telemann – Ach Herr, strafe mich nicht, TWV 7:3
- Tomaso Antonio Vitali – Concerto di sonate a violino, violoncello e cembalo, Op.4

== Opera ==
- Antonio Caldara
  - Costanza in amor vince l'inganno (Includes arias "Selve Amiche" and "Sebben, Crudele")
  - La Partenope
- Andre Campra – Hésione (final revised version)
- Theobaldo di Gatti – Scylla
- Reinhard Keiser – Störtebecker und Jödge Michaels
- Tomás de Torrejón y Velasco – La púrpura de la rosa

== Theoretical writings ==
- Johan Georg Ahlens musikalisches Winter-Gespräche by Johann Georg Ahle, on intervals and modes. This is the fourth and final part of Ahle's Musikalische Gespräche series of treatises in form of dialogues.
- Dictionnaire de musique by Sébastien de Brossard.
- Principes d'acoustique et de musique by Joseph Sauveur

== Births ==
- January 10 – Johann Caspar Simon, organist and composer (died 1776)
- February 1 – Johan Agrell, German composer and violinist (died 1765)
- June 19 – François Rebel, French composer (died 1775)
- September 22 – Anna Magdalena Bach, second wife of Johann Sebastian Bach, to whom he dedicated several of his works (died 1760)

== Deaths ==
- February 15 – Adam Drese, composer and bass viol player (b. c.1620)
- March 10 – Johann Schelle, composer (b. 1648
- October 13 – Andreas Anton Schmelzer, composer (b. 1653)
- probable
  - Carolus Hacquart, composer (b. c.1640)
  - Servaes de Koninck, composer (b. c.1654)
