= Jacques Paisible =

French composer (1656–1721)

Jacques Paisible (ca. 1656 – 1721), also known as James Peasable or James Paisible, was a French baroque composer and recorder virtuoso who lived and worked in London for about forty years.

Paisible arrived in London from France in September 1673, one of the four oboists among the musicians accompanying Robert Cambert. He married Moll Davis, singer and mistress of Charles II, in 1686. He made his living playing the bass violin and composing theater music. He developed a reputation as a first-rate performer on the recorder. Most of his surviving compositions use the recorder in various combinations. His music has been characterized as "craftsmanlike and idiomatic, with no virtuoso pretensions."

Paisible was a contemporary of Henry Purcell (1659–1695), one of England's great composers, and long outlived him in years, if not in reputation.

== Works (selection) ==
- “Rare en tout”, Comédie-Ballet (1677)
- “The Humor of Sir Falstaff” (1700)
- “King Edward III” (ca 1700)
- “Love’s Stratagem” (1701)
- “She Wou'd & She Wou'd not”
- “The Complete Flute-Master” (1695)
- Six Sonatas for flute [recorder] Op. 1 (1702)
- “Mr. Isaak's New Dances Master for her Majesty's Birthday” (1704)
- “Six Setts of Aires” for 2 flutes [recorders] and B.C. Op. 2 (1720)
