= 1759 in music =

List of years in music	(table)
- … 1749; 1750; 1751; 1752; 1753; 1754; 1755; 1756; 1757; 1758; 1759; 1760; 1761; 1762; 1763; 1764; 1765; 1766; 1767; 1768; 1769 …
- Art; Archaeology; Architecture; Literature; Music; Philosophy; Science; +...

== Events ==
- Johann Friedrich Agricola succeeds Carl Heinrich Graun as director of Frederick the Great's royal opera.
- Castrato Gaspare Pacchierotti makes his debut at the Perugia carnival, in a female role.
- Tommaso Traetta becomes court composer at Parma.

== Popular music ==
- None listed

== Opera ==
- Johann Ernst Eberlin – Demofoonte (lost)
- Baldassare Galuppi – La clemenza di Tito
- Florian Leopold Gassmann – Gli uccellatori
- Christoph Willibald Gluck – L'Arbre enchantée; Cythère Assiégée
- François Danican Philidor – Blaise le savetier
- Niccolò Piccinni – Ciro riconosciuto
- Tommaso Traetta – Ippolito ed Aricia
- Johann Adolph Hasse
  - La clemenza di Tito
  - Achille in Sciro

== Classical music ==
- Carl Friedrich Abel – 6 Symphonies, Op. 1
- Carl Philipp Emanuel Bach – Viola da Gamba Sonata in G minor, H.510
- Wilhelm Friedemann Bach – Pieces for Musical Clock
- Claude-Bénigne Balbastre – Pièces de clavecin
- William Boyce – "Heart of Oak"
- François Joseph Gossec – Sei sinfonie a più stromenti, op.4
- Joseph Haydn
  - Divertimento in G major, Hob.II:G1
  - Symphony no 1 in D Major Hob.I:1
- Leopold Mozart
  - Der Morgen und der Abend (pieces for keyboard)
  - Nannerl's Music Book
- Johan Helmich Roman – Concerto Grosso, BeRI 45
- Georg Philipp Telemann – Der Messias, TWV 6:4

== Methods and music theory ==
- Pietro Gianotti – Le guide du compositeur
- Cornforth Gilson – Lessons on the Practice of Singing
- Antoine Mahaut – Nouvelle Méthode pour jouer la Flûte Traversière
- Friedrich Wilhelm Marpurg – Kritische Einleitung in die Geschichte und Lehrsätze der alten und neuen Musik
- Robert Smith – Harmonics, or The Philosophy of Musical Sounds

== Births ==
- January 19 – Karl Alexander Herklots, librettist and author (died 1830)
- January 20 – Giuseppe Bertini, composer, choral conductor, music lexicographer, and priest (d. 1852)
- January 24 – Francesco Saverio Salfi, librettist and writer (died 1832)
- January 25 – Robert Burns, Scottish poet and lyricist (died 1796)
- January 31 – François Devienne, composer (died 1803)
- February 1 – Karl Friedrich Hensler, librettist and author (died 1825)
- February 11 – Ernst von Gemmingen, composer and diplomat (died 1813)
- February 27 – Johann Carl Friedrich Rellstab, music editor and composer (died 1813)
- April 18 – Jacques Widerkehr, Alsatian composer and cellist (died 1823)
- 15 May – Maria Theresia von Paradis, musician and composer (died 1824)
- May 22 – Gervais-François Couperin, French composer (died 1826)
- June 19 – Helen Maria Williams, librettist and writer (died 1827)
- 19 July – Marianna Auenbrugger, composer (died 1782)
- July 29 – Antonio Simone Sografi, librettist and playwright (died 1818)
- November 10 – Friedrich Schiller, librettist and poet (died 1805)
- November 27 – Franz Krommer, composer (died 1831)
- December 25 – John Beckwith, composer and musician (died 1809)
- unknown date
  - Franz Gleissner, German composer (died 1818)
  - William Matthews of Nottingham, composer

== Deaths ==
- March 19 – Sebastian Bodinus, German composer (born c. 1700)
- April 14 – George Frideric Handel, composer (born 1685)
- June 12 – William Collins, librettist and poet (born 1721)
- June 22 – Louis de Cahusac, librettist (born 1706)
- July 25 – Johann Christoph Altnickol, organist, singer and composer (born 1719)
- August 8 – Carl Heinrich Graun, composer (born 1704)
- August 24 – Ewald Christian von Kleist, librettist and poet (born 1715)
- September 4 – Girolamo Chiti, composer
- October 18 – Louis de Caix d'Hervelois, French composer (born c. 1680)
- date unknown – Gustavus Waltz, singer
