= 1761 in music =

List of years in music	(table)
- … 1751; 1752; 1753; 1754; 1755; 1756; 1757; 1758; 1759; 1760; 1761; 1762; 1763; 1764; 1765; 1766; 1767; 1768; 1769; 1770; 1771 …
- Art; Archaeology; Architecture; Literature; Music; Philosophy; Science; +...

== Events ==
- Francesco Geminiani visits Dublin, where he is robbed of a valuable manuscript.
- Domenico Cimarosa enters the Conservatorio di Santa Maria di Loreto.
- Joseph Haydn enters the service of the Esterházy family

== Popular music ==
- Mme Papavoine – '"Reviens, aimable Thémire" (Paris)
- John Parry – A collection of Welsh, English & Scotch airs with new variations, also four new lessons for the harp or harpsichord... to which are added twelve airs for the guitar (London: John Johnson)

== Opera ==
- Charles-Guillaume Alexandre – George et Georgette
- Johann Christian Bach – Catone in Utica, W.G 2
- Pasquale Cafaro – Ipermestra (revised version, premiered Dec. 26 in Naples)
- Florian Leopold Gassmann – Catone in Utica
- Baldassare Galuppi
  - Demetrio (revised version, premiered June in Padua)
  - Le Tre Amante Ridicoli (premiered Jan. 18 in Venice)
- Christoph Willibald Gluck – Le cadi dupé, Wq.29
- Niccolò Jommelli – L'Olimpiade
- Tommaso Traetta – Armida
- Johann Adolf Hasse – Zenobia

== Classical music ==
- Thomas Arne – Judith (oratorio) (first published; first performed 1744)
- Charles Avison – 6 Sonatas for Harpsichord, 2 Violins and Cello, Op. 8
- Carl Philipp Emanuel Bach
  - La Philippine, H.96
  - La Gabriel, H.97
  - La Caroline, H.98
  - La Complaisante, H.109
  - La Louise, H.114
  - La Xénophon et la Sybille, H.123
  - L'Ernestine, H.124
- Christoph Willibald Gluck – Don Juan (ballet)
- François Joseph Gossec – Sei sinfonie a più stromenti, Op. 5
- Joseph Haydn
  - Symphony No. 6 ("Le matin")
  - Symphony No. 7 ("Le midi")
  - Symphony No. 8 ("Le soir")
  - Symphony No.11
- Michael Haydn – Symphony in C major
- Gottfried August Homilius – 32 Praeludia zu geistlichen Liedern vor zwey Claviere und Pedal
- Wolfgang Amadeus Mozart –
  - Andante in C major for harpsichord, K. 1a
  - Allegro in C major for harpsichord, K. 1b
  - Allegro in F major for harpsichord, K. 1c
  - Minuet in F major for harpsichord, K. 1d
- Simon Simon – Pièces de clavecin, Op. 1
- Ludwig Zoschinger – Concors digitorum discordia seu 4 Partiæ
- Johann Adolph Hasse
  - La Scusa
  - Il Nome

== Methods and theory writings ==
- Jean-Philippe Rameau – Origine des sciences

== Births ==
- January 20 – Giovanni Domenico Perotti, composer (died 1825)
- January 22 – Georg Nikolaus von Nissen, biographer of Mozart (died 1826)
- January 23 – Friedrich von Matthisson, librettist (died 1831)
- January 26 – Jens Zetlitz, songwriter (died 1821)
- February 15 – Jacob Kimball, Jr., composer (died 1826)
- February 20 – Johann Christian Ludwig Abeille, pianist and composer
- February 22 – Erik Tulindberg, composer (died 1814)
- April 20 – Johann Gottlieb Karl Spazier, composer
- May 3 – August von Kotzebue, librettist (died 1819)
- June 13 – Antonín Vranický or Wranitzky, violinist and composer (died 1820)
- June 15 – Charles Henry Wilton, British musician (died 1832)
- July 20 – Joseph Lefebvre, composer
- September 24 – F.L.Æ. Kunzen, composer
- October 9 – Pierre Gaveaux, composer and operatic tenor (died 1825)
- date unknown
  - Antoine Hugot, composer (died 1803)
  - John Andrew Stevenson, composer (died 1833)

== Deaths ==
- January 3 – Willem de Fesch, violinist and composer (born 1687)
- January 18 – Francesco Feo, opera composer (born 1691)
- February 15 – Carlo Cecere, composer (born 1706)
- March 7 – Antonio Palella, composer
- March 27 – Johann Ludwig Steiner, composer
- April 10 – Cecilia Elisabeth Würzer, German-Swedish singer
- June 12 – Meinrad Spiess, composer
- July 9 – Carl Gotthelf Gerlach, organist (born 1704)
- October 7 – Johann Pfeiffer, German composer (born 1697)
- date unknown
  - Adam Falckenhagen, lutenist and composer (born 1697)
  - Newburgh Hamilton, librettist (born 1691)
