= 1771 in music =

List of years in music	(table)
- … 1761; 1762; 1763; 1764; 1765; 1766; 1767; 1768; 1769; 1770; 1771; 1772; 1773; 1774; 1775; 1776; 1777; 1778; 1779; 1780; 1781 …
- Art; Archaeology; Architecture; Literature; Music; Philosophy; Science; +...

== Events ==
- March 28 – Mozart returns to Salzburg from a tour of Italy but is back in Milan for the premiere of his opera Ascanio in Alba on October 17.
- Foundation of the Royal Theatre Ballet School in Copenhagen, Denmark.
- The Chevalier de Saint-Georges is appointed maestro of the Concert des Amateurs in Paris.
- Probable – Carl Ditters von Dittersdorf becomes Hoffkomponist (court composer) to Philipp Gotthard von Schaffgotsch, Prince-Bishop of Breslau, at château Jánský Vrch (Johannesberg) in Javorník.

== Classical music ==
- Carl Friedrich Abel
  - 6 Trio Sonatas, WK 86-91 Op. 9
  - 6 Easy Sonatas, WK 141–146
- Carl Philipp Emanuel Bach
  - 6 Harpsichord Concertos, Wq.43
  - Ich will dem Herrn lobsingen
- Luigi Boccherini
  - Cello Sonata in A major, G.4
  - 6 String Quintets, G.265-270, Op. 10
  - 6 String Quintets Op. 11 (with the famous minuet, No. 5 (G 275))
  - Symphony in D major, Op. 12 no 1/G 503
  - Symphony in E-flat major, Op. 12 no 2/G 504
  - Symphony in C major, Op. 12 no 3/G 505
- František Xaver Brixi – Pastorella in C major for organ
- Muzio Clementi – 6 Piano Sonatas, Op. 1
- Ernst Eichner
  - 3 Harpsichord Trios, Op. 3
  - Harp Concerto in D major, Op. 9
- Baldassare Galuppi
  - Confitebor tibi Domine in G major
  - Jephte et Helcana (oratorio)
- Tommaso Giordani – 6 Harpsichord Quintets, Op. 1
- Joseph Haydn
  - Baryton Trio in A major, Hob.XI:7
  - Baryton Trio in A major, Hob.XI:9
  - Baryton Trio in B minor, Hob.XI:96
  - Piano Sonata in C minor Hob. XVI:20
  - Keyboard Concerto in C major, Hob.XVIII:10
  - Symphony No. 42
  - Symphony No. 43
- James Hook – 6 Keyboard Concertos, Op. 1
- Thomas Linley Jr – Violin Concerto in F major
- Leopold Mozart – Missa brevis in C major (formerly attributed to W.A. Mozart as K. 115)
- Wolfgang Amadeus Mozart
  - Aria for soprano and orchestra, “Non curo l’affetto”, K. 74b
  - Symphony No. 12
  - Symphony No. 13
  - Symphony No. 14
  - Symphony in F, “No. 42”, K. 75/75
  - Symphony No. 46 in C major, K.96/111b
  - Symphony No. 50 in D major, K.161/141a
  - Divertimento No. 1 in E-flat major, K. 113
  - Regina coeli for soprano, chorus and orchestra in C major, K. 108/74d
  - Litaniae Lauretanae in B-flat major, K. 109/74e
  - Betulia liberata, oratorio K. 118/74c
- Johann Gottfried Müthel – Keyboard Duet in E-flat major
- Josef Mysliveček – Veni sponsa Christi
- Johann Gottfried Wilhelm Palschau – Harpsichord Concertos No.1-2
- Niccolo Piccinni – Le finte gemelle, intermezzo premiered Jan. 2 in Rome
- Johann Baptist Wanhal
  - 6 String Quartets, Op. 6
  - 6 Oboe Quartets, Op. 7

== Opera ==
- Pasquale Anfossi
  - Lucio Papirio
  - Quinto Fabio
  - I visionari
- Thomas Arne – The Fairy Prince
- André Grétry
  - L'ami de la maison
  - Zémire et Azor
- Johann Adolph Hasse – Il Ruggiero
- Wolfgang Amadeus Mozart – Ascanio in Alba
- Josef Mysliveček – Il Gran Tamerlano
- Giovanni Paisiello
  - Annibale in Torino
  - Artaserse, R.1.30
  - Demetrio, R.1.25
  - I scherzi di amore e di fortuna, R.1.28
- Antonio Salieri – Armida

== Methods and theory writings ==
- Anselm Bayly – A Practical Treatise on Singing and Playing
- Anton Bemetzrieder – Leçons de clavecin, et principes d’harmonie
- Charles Burney – The Present State of Music in France and Italy
- Johann Kirnberger – Die Kunst des reinen Satzes in der Musik

== Births ==
- February 9 – Daniel Belknap, composer (d. 1815)
- February 24 – Johann Baptist Cramer, pianist (d. 1858)
- March 19 – Frederik Høegh-Guldberg, poet and librettist (died 1852)
- March 21 – Thomas John Dibdin, dramatist and songwriter (d. 1841)
- May 13 – Siegfried August Mahlmann, librettist and poet (died 1826)
- June 1 – Ferdinando Paër, Italian composer (died 1839)
- August 15 – Walter Scott, librettist and novelist (died 1832)
- August 27 – Friedrich Methfessel, composer (died 1807)
- September 17 – Johann August Apel, librettist (d. 1816)
- October 1 – Pierre Baillot, violinist and composer (d. 1842)
- October 3 – Auguste Creuzé de Lesser, librettist and politician (died 1839)
- October 9 – Charles-Augustin Bassompierre (Sewrin), librettist (died 1853)
- October 29 – Anna Leonore König, member of the Royal Swedish Academy of Music (d. 1854)
- November 1 – Stephan Schütze, librettist (died 1839)
- November 4 – James Montgomery, librettist and editor (died 1854)
- November 17 – Jonathan Huntington, composer (d. 1838)
- December 26 – Heinrich Joseph von Collin, librettist and poet (died 1811)

date unknown:

- Marie Antoinette Petersén, singer and member of the Royal Swedish Academy of Music (d. 1855)
- Margareta Sofia Lagerqvist, opera singer (d. 1800)

== Deaths ==
- January 23 – Martin Berteau, composer and musician (born 1691)
- March 11 – Christoph Birkmann, hymnist and pupil of JS Bach (born 1703)
- March 30 – Anton Joseph Hampel, horn player (b. 1710)
- May 20 – Christopher Smart, poet and hymn-writer (b. 1722; possible liver failure)
- May 29 – Johann Adolph Hass, clavichord and harpsichord maker (b. 1713)
- July 30 – Thomas Gray, librettist and poet (born 1716)
- August 19 – Daniel Schiebeler, librettist and hymnist (born 1741)
- October – René de Galard de Béarn, Marquis de Brassac, composer (born 1699)
- October 14 – František Brixi, composer (b. 1732)
- October 28 – Johann Gottlieb Graun, composer (b. 1703)
- November 4 – Pierre Nicolas Brunet, librettist and playwright (born 1733)
- November 18 – Giuseppe de Majo, Italian composer (born 1697)
- date unknown – Andrea Soldi, copyist and portraitist (born 1703)
