= Nannerl Notenbuch =

Music collection for Maria Anna Mozart

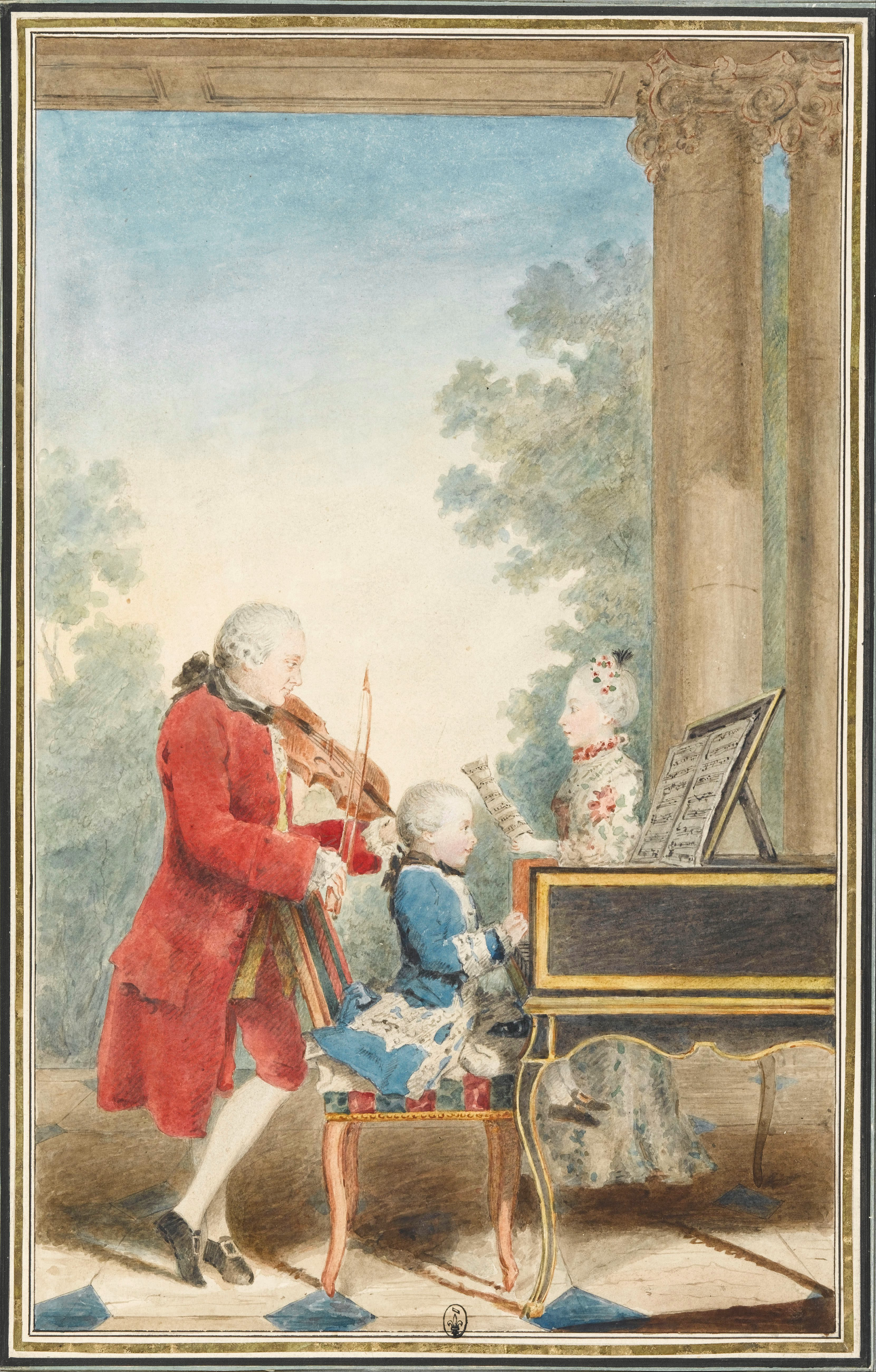
Carmontelle's 1763–64 Mozart family portrait

The Nannerl Notenbuch, or Notenbuch für Nannerl (English: Nannerl's Music Book) is a book in which Leopold Mozart, from 1759 to about 1764, wrote pieces for his daughter, Maria Anna Mozart (known as "Nannerl"), to learn and play. His son Wolfgang also used the book, in which his earliest compositions were recorded. The book contains simple short keyboard (typically harpsichord) pieces, suitable for beginners; there are many anonymous minuets, some works by Leopold, and a few works by other composers including Carl Philipp Emanuel Bach and the Austrian composer Georg Christoph Wagenseil. There are also some technical exercises, a table of intervals, and some modulating figured basses. The notebook originally contained 48 bound pages of music paper, but only 36 pages remain, with some of the missing 12 pages identified in other collections. Because of the simplicity of the pieces it contains, the book is often used to provide instruction to beginning piano players.

== Description of the Notenbuch ==
Originally the Notenbuch was a bound volume of forty-eight pages of blank music paper, with eight staves on each page. Inscribed with the words Pour le clavecin (French: For the harpsichord), it was presented to Nannerl on the occasion of her eighth name day on 26 July 1759 (or possibly her eighth birthday, which fell on the 30th or 31st day of the same month). Over the course of the next four years or so, the notebook was gradually filled with pieces written out by Leopold and two or three anonymous Salzburg copyists. Wolfgang is thought to have written out four pieces. Curiously none of the pieces were inscribed by Nannerl herself.

In later years, twelve individual pages were removed from the notebook for one reason or another. Of these, four are now considered lost, but the remaining eight have been identified by Alan Tyson:

- two pages in the Bibliothèque Nationale, Paris;
- one in the Museum Carolino Augusteum, Salzburg;
- two in the Pierpont Morgan Library, New York City;
- one in the Leipzig University Library, Leipzig;
- one survives only as a facsimile and consists of the opening measures of K. 5b;
- one, now in a private collection, consists of a single leaf containing the rest of K. 5b.

The four lost pages have been tentatively reconstructed using a variety of other sources (Nannerl's letters and Georg Nissen's biography of Mozart). It is believed that in its completed state the Notenbuch contained a total of 64 pieces (including exercises and unfinished compositions), of which 52 are in the surviving 36 pages of the book.

Wolfgang Plath (1982) has deduced the existence of five scribes, from a study of the handwriting in the Notenbuch. In addition to Leopold and Wolfgang, three anonymous scribes from Salzburg – known as Anonymous I, Anonymous II and Anonymous III – have been identified. Numbers 58 and 61, thought to be in the four missing pages, are known only from Nissen's material; Plath assumed that these two pieces were copied out by Leopold, who was responsible for more than half the contents of the Notenbuch.

The Notenbuch provides evidence of the collaboration between the young Wolfgang and his father. For example, number 48 is an arrangement of the third movement of Leopold's D major serenade, but the trio also appears as Menuet II in Wolfgang's Sonata K. 6.

The Notenbuch is also useful in providing evidence of Leopold's approach to teaching music. The tables of intervals show that he taught music theory to his children from the start. It seems that he also taught composition from the outset, by means of a given bass line, a melody to be varied, a melody to be continued, and a structural model.

The earliest compositions by Wolfgang are written in Leopold's hand; the father's gentle suggestions for amendments came later.

== Wolfgang Mozart's compositions in the book ==
The Notenbuch contains the following pieces by Wolfgang:

=== Andante in C, K. 1a ===
Andante in C

This piece of music was Mozart's first composition. It is an extremely short piece, consisting of just 10 measures.

It is normally performed on the harpsichord and is in the key of C. The piece opens with a one-bar phrase in 3/4 time, which is then repeated. A second, modified phrase receives the same treatment. The time signature then changes to 2/4 and in the following four measures Mozart reverts to a typically Baroque style. The piece concludes with a simple authentic cadence.

=== Allegro in C, K. 1b ===
Allegro in C

An extremely short work, consisting of only twelve measures.

It is normally performed on the harpsichord, and is in the key of C. As the tempo indicates, it is a fast and lively piece. Unlike K. 1a, this piece is not based on repeated phrases. It begins with an ascending scale in the right hand from the dominant (G) to the mediant (E) on the first and third beats of the bars, while the left hand adds a counterpoint on the off beats. After reaching a peak, the right hand drops down in a series of quarter notes and eighth notes, accompanied by a very simple bass part. Curiously, the final cadence takes place between the eighth and ninth measures: in the last four measures, which make up a quarter of the entire composition, Mozart rings various changes on an unadorned C major triad.

=== Allegro in F, K. 1c ===
Allegro in F

This piece, Allegro for keyboard in F, K. 1c runs to twenty-four measures (including repeats). It was composed by Wolfgang on 11 December 1761 in Salzburg.

This piece was written for the harpsichord and is usually performed on that instrument today, though other keyboard instruments may be used. This Allegro is Mozart's earliest extant piece in F major. Like K. 1b, it is in a fast tempo. It is in rounded binary form, with repeat signs at the end of each of the sections: ||:A:||:BA:||, where A and B each consists of four bars. The music is simple and classical in style. This piece has been compared to a "jolly south German folkdance".

=== Minuet in F, K. 1d ===
Minuet in F

The minuet in F is a very short piece (around a minute in length) in extended binary form. The first section is just eight measures long and the second section twelve; both are marked with repeat signs. K. 1d was notated by Leopold Mozart; Wolfgang was five years old when he composed this piece.

It was written for the harpsichord and is usually performed on that instrument, though other keyboard instruments may be used. This dance is Mozart's earliest extant composition in minuet form. As a minuet it is, by definition, stately in feeling and written in 3/4 time. Like all Mozart's compositions in the Notenbuch, the clearest influences on the style are to be found in the pieces he was studying by Leopold Mozart and Georg Christoph Wagenseil.

It consists of several phrases each beginning with chords, after which broken chords and triplets are used.

=== Minuet in G, K. 1e ===
Minuet in G

Another short piece, of 18 measures, it was probably notated by his father, Leopold Mozart, since Wolfgang was five or six years old at the time.

It was written for the harpsichord and is hence usually performed on the harpsichord, though other keyboard instruments may be used. This minuet in G major is in Mozart's first collection of works. As a minuet, it is relatively fast in 3/4 time. Unlike K. 1d, it is far less influenced by the baroque style.

It is largely constructed of phrases which are repeated: every two bars are announced by a descending fifth, after which 4 chords are played, a tune is constructed within this restraint. Each phrase is 8 bars long. In two-part harmony, it consists of 3 sections: the opening, a contrasting trio, and reprise of the original.

=== Minuet in C, K. 1f ===
Minuet in C, K. 1f

A short piece (around a minute in length); it was probably notated by his father, Leopold, since Wolfgang was only five or six years old at the time.

It was written for the harpsichord and is hence usually performed on the harpsichord, though other keyboard instruments may be used. This minuet is in Mozart's first collection of works. As a minuet it is relatively fast in 3/4 time. It is, unlike K. 1d far less influenced by the baroque style.

It is largely constructed of phrases which are repeated: every two bars is announced by a descending fifth, after which 4 chords are played, a tune is constructed within this restraint. Each phrase is 8 bars long. It was, in Köchel's first catalogue listed as K. 1 along with Minuet in G, K. 1e.

=== Minuet in F, K. 2 ===
Minuet in F, K. 2

A very short work (around a minute in length); it was most likely notated by his father, Leopold, as Wolfgang was only five or six years old at the time. The entry for this work was composed in Salzburg in January 1762.

It was written for the harpsichord and is hence usually performed on the harpsichord, though other keyboard instruments may be used.

This piece is a single bar motif which is developed into an eight-bar exposition, which is repeated, and then modulated for another eight bars before being repeated again.

=== Allegro in B♭, K. 3 ===
Allegro in B♭, K. 3

A very short, yet lively piece (around a minute in length); it was most likely notated by his father, Leopold, as Wolfgang was six years old at the time. The entry for this work states it was composed in Salzburg on 4 March 1762.

It was written for the harpsichord and is hence usually performed on the harpsichord, though other keyboard instruments may be used.

=== Minuet in F, K. 4 ===
Minuet in F, K. 4

A short minuet (around a minute in length); it was most likely notated by his father, Leopold, as Wolfgang was six years old at the time. The entry for this work states it was composed in Salzburg on 11 May 1762.

It was written for the harpsichord and is hence usually performed on the harpsichord, though other keyboard instruments may be used.

=== Minuet in F "Triolen-Menuett", K. 5 ===
Minuet in F "Triolen-Menuett", K. 5

Another short minuet, featuring triplets, the last in the Notenbuch; it was most likely notated by his father, Leopold, as Wolfgang was six years old at the time. The entry for this work states it was composed in Salzburg on 5 July 1762.

It was written for the harpsichord and is hence usually performed on the harpsichord, though other keyboard instruments may be used.

=== Klavierstück in C, K. 5a ===
Klavierstück in C, K. 5a

A longer piece (around double the amount of time compared to that of other entries in the Notenbuch); the first piece in the book to be inscribed by the young Wolfgang. The entry date for this work states it was composed in Salzburg, sometime during 1764; the precise date is not known.

It was written for the harpsichord and is hence usually performed on the harpsichord, though other keyboard instruments may be used.

=== Andante in B♭, K. 5b ===
Andante in B♭ (fragment)

The final surviving piece in the Nannerl Notenbuch, of which only a fragment is left; notated again by Leopold. Estimated to be composed in Salzburg, around 1764.

It runs for 61 measures (including repeats) and usually performed on the Harpsichord, though other keyboard instruments may be used.

== Table of contents ==
The following table summarizes the contents of the Notenbuch.

No.	Piece	Copyist	Composer	K.	Added comments	Notes
1	Menuett in C	Anonymous I	Anonymous	–	–	–
2	Menuett in F	Anonymous I	Anonymous	–	–	–
3	Menuett in C	Anonymous I	Anonymous	–	–	–
4	Menuett in G	Anonymous I	Anonymous	–	–	–
5	Menuett in F	Anonymous I	Anonymous	–	–	–
6	Menuett in F	Anonymous I	Anonymous	–	–	–
7	Menuett in D	Anonymous I	Anonymous	–	–	–
8	Menuett in F	Anonymous I	Anonymous	–	Diese vorgehenden 8 Menuetten hat d. Wolfgangerl im 4^{ten} Jahr gelernet (Wolfgang learned the preceding 8 minuets in his 4th year)	–
9	Menuett in A	Leopold	Anonymous	–	–	–
10	Menuett in D	Leopold	Anonymous	–	–	–
11	Menuett in F	Anonymous I	Anonymous	–	Disen Menuet und Trio hat dr Wolfgangerl den 26^{ten} Januarij 1761 einen Tag vor seinem 5^{ten} Jahr um halbe 10 Uhr in einer halben Stund gelernet (Wolfgang learned this minuet and trio in half-an-hour around 9:30 on 26 January 1761, one day before his 5th birthday)	–
12	Menuett in A	Leopold	Anonymous	–	–	–
13	Menuett in A	Leopold	Anonymous	–	–	–
14	Menuett in E	Leopold	Anonymous	–	–	–
15	Menuett in E	Leopold	Anonymous	–	–	–
16	Menuett in C	Anonymous I	Anonymous	–	–	–
17	Menuett in F	Leopold	Leopold	–	–	–
18	Menuett in B♭	Leopold	Anonymous	–	–	–
19	Menuett in F	Anonymous I	Anonymous	K. 32	Diesen Menuet hat d. Wolfgangerl auch im vierten jahr seines alters gelernet (Wolfgang also learned this minuet when he was four years of age)	K. 32 (Gallimathias musicum), No. 14, is an orchestral version of this piece
20	Klavierstück in C	Wolfgang	Wolfgang	K. 5a	–	Probably added in 1764
21	Menuett in C	Anonymous II	Anonymous	–	–	–
22	Marsch in F (I)	Anonymous I	Anonymous	–	den 4^{ten} feb. 1761 vom Wolfgangerl gelernet Learned by Wolfgang on the 4 February 1761	–
23	Marsch in F (II)	Leopold	Anonymous	–	–	–
24	Allegro in B♭	Leopold	Wolfgang	K. 8	di Wolfgang Mozart à Paris le 21 Novb. 1763 by Wolfgang Mozart in Paris on 21 November 1763	A piano version of the first movement of Violin Sonata No. 3 in B♭, K. 8
25	Andante in F	Leopold	Wolfgang	K. 6	–	A piano version of the second movement of Violin Sonata No. 1 in C, K. 6 Probably written in Brussels in October 1763
26	Menuett in C	Leopold	Wolfgang	K. 6	–	A piano version of Menuet I from the third movement of Violin Sonata No. 1 in C, K. 6 Probably written in Brussels in October 1763
27	Allegro in C	Anonymous I	Anonymous	–	–	–
28	Allegro in F	Anonymous I	Anonymous	–	–	–
29	Klavierstück in F	Anonymous I	Anonymous	–	–	–
30	Allegro in G	Anonymous I	Anonymous	–	–	–
31	Scherzo in C	Anonymous I	Wagenseil	–	del Sgr. Wagenseil (By Signore Wagenseil)	–
32	Scherzo in F	Anonymous I	Anonymous	–	–	–
33	Allegro in F	Leopold	Anonymous	–	–	–
34	Allegro in C	Leopold	Anonymous	–	–	–
35	Tempo di menuetto in F	Anonymous II	Anonymous	–	–	–
36	Allegro moderato in F	Anonymous I	Anonymous	–	–	–
37	Andante in B♭	Leopold	Anonymous	–	–	–
38	Andante in C	Leopold	Anonymous	–	–	–
39	Arietta con Variazioni in A	Anonymous III	C.P.E. Bach	–	–	–
40	Allegro in C	Leopold	Anonymous	–	–	–
41	Allegro in G	Leopold	Anonymous	–	–	–
42	Allegro in G minor	Leopold	Anonymous	–	–	–
43	Presto in A	Anonymous III	J. N. Tischer	–	–	–
44	Polonaise in F	Leopold	Anonymous	–	–	–
45	Allegro in E minor	Leopold	Agrell	–	–	–
46	Allegro in C	Leopold	Wolfgang	K. 6	di Wolfgango Mozart d. 14 octob. (by Wolfgang Mozart on 14 October)	A piano version of the first movement of Violin Sonata No. 1, K. 6 Probably composed in Brussels in 1763
47	Menuett in D	Leopold	Wolfgang	K. 7	di Wolfgango Mozart d. 30^{ten} Novbr. 1763 à Paris (by Wolfgang Mozart in Paris in 1763)	A piano version of Menuet I from Violin Sonata No. 2 in D, K. 7
48	Menuett in F	Leopold	Wolfgang	K. 6	di Wolfgango Mozart d. 16^{ten} Julÿ 1762 (by Wolfgang Mozart on 16 July 1762)	A piano version of the third movement of Leopold's Serenade in D and Menuet II from the third movement of Wolfgang's Violin Sonata No. 1 in C Composed in Salzburg
49	Menuett in F	Leopold	Wolfgang	K. 4	di Wolfgango Mozart d. 11^{ten} Maÿ 1762 (by Wolfgang Mozart on 11 May 1762)	Minuet in F, K. 4 Composed in Salzburg
50	Klavierstück in G	Leopold	Anonymous	–	–	Fragment
51	Konzertsatz in G	Leopold	Anonymous	–	–	“A sketch or a draft of a keyboard concerto movement, although it cannot be performed as such” (Cliff Eisen); performing version by Robert Levin released on Vol. 10 of the Complete Mozart Piano Concertos by Levin and the Academy of Ancient Music (2023)
52	Fünf technische Übungen	Leopold	Anonymous	–	–	Exercise: Five technical exercises
53	Andante in C	Leopold	Wolfgang	K. 1a	–	–
54	Allegro in C	Leopold	Wolfgang	K. 1b	–	–
55	Allegro in F	Leopold	Wolfgang	K. 1c	–	–
56	Minuet in F	Leopold	Wolfgang	K. 1d	Menuetto del Sgr. Wolfgango Mozart 16^{to} Decembris 1761 (Minuet by Wolfgang Mozart on 16 December 1761)	–
57	Intervalltabelle	Leopold	Anonymous	–	–	Exercise: a table of musical intervals
58	Menuett in F	Leopold?	Wolfgang	K. 2	–	Minuet in F, K. 2
59	Allegro in B♭	Leopold	Wolfgang	K. 3	del Sgr. Wolfgango Mozart 1762. d. 4^{ten} Martij (by Wolfgang Mozart on 4 March 1762)	Allegro in B♭, K. 3 Composed in Salzburg
60	Drei modulierende Generalbaßübungen	Leopold	Anonymous	–	–	Exercise: 3 modulating general basses
61	Menuett in F	Leopold?	Wolfgang	K. 5	5. Juli 1762; 5 July 1762	Minuet in F, K. 5 Composed in Salzburg
62	Menuett in G	Wolfgang	Wolfgang	K. 1e	–	Minuet in G, K. 1e Probably added in 1764
63	Menuett in C	Wolfgang	Wolfgang	K. 1f	–	Minuet in C, K. 1f Probably added in 1764
64	Klavierstück in B♭	Wolfgang	Wolfgang	K. 5b	–	Fragment of an Andante in B♭, K. 5b (K. 9b in K^{1}); Probably added in 1764

== Notes ==
=== Sources ===
- Eisen, Cliff (2001). "Mozart, (Johann Georg) Leopold". Grove Music Online (8th ed.). Oxford University Press. doi:10.1093/gmo/9781561592630.article.6002278234. ISBN 978-1-56159-263-0. (subscription, Wikilibrary access, or UK public library membership required)
- Eisen, Cliff; Keefe, Simon P. (2006). The Cambridge Mozart Encyclopedia. Cambridge University Press. ISBN 0-521-85659-0.
- Kenyon, Nicholas (2005). The Faber Pocket Guide to Mozart. Faber & Faber. ISBN 0-571-22376-1.
- Plath, Wolfgang (1982). "I. Notenbuch für Maria Anna (Nannerl) Mozart (1759)". Neue Mozart-Ausgabe. IX/27: Klavierstücke. Vol. 1. Die Notenbücher.
- Sadie, Stanley (2006). Mozart; The Early years 1756–1781. Oxford University Press. ISBN 978-0-19-816529-3.
- Tyson, Alan (October 1979). "A Reconstruction of Nannerl Mozart's Music Book (Notenbuch)". Music & Letters. 60 (4): 389–400. JSTOR 733504.
