= 1755 in music =

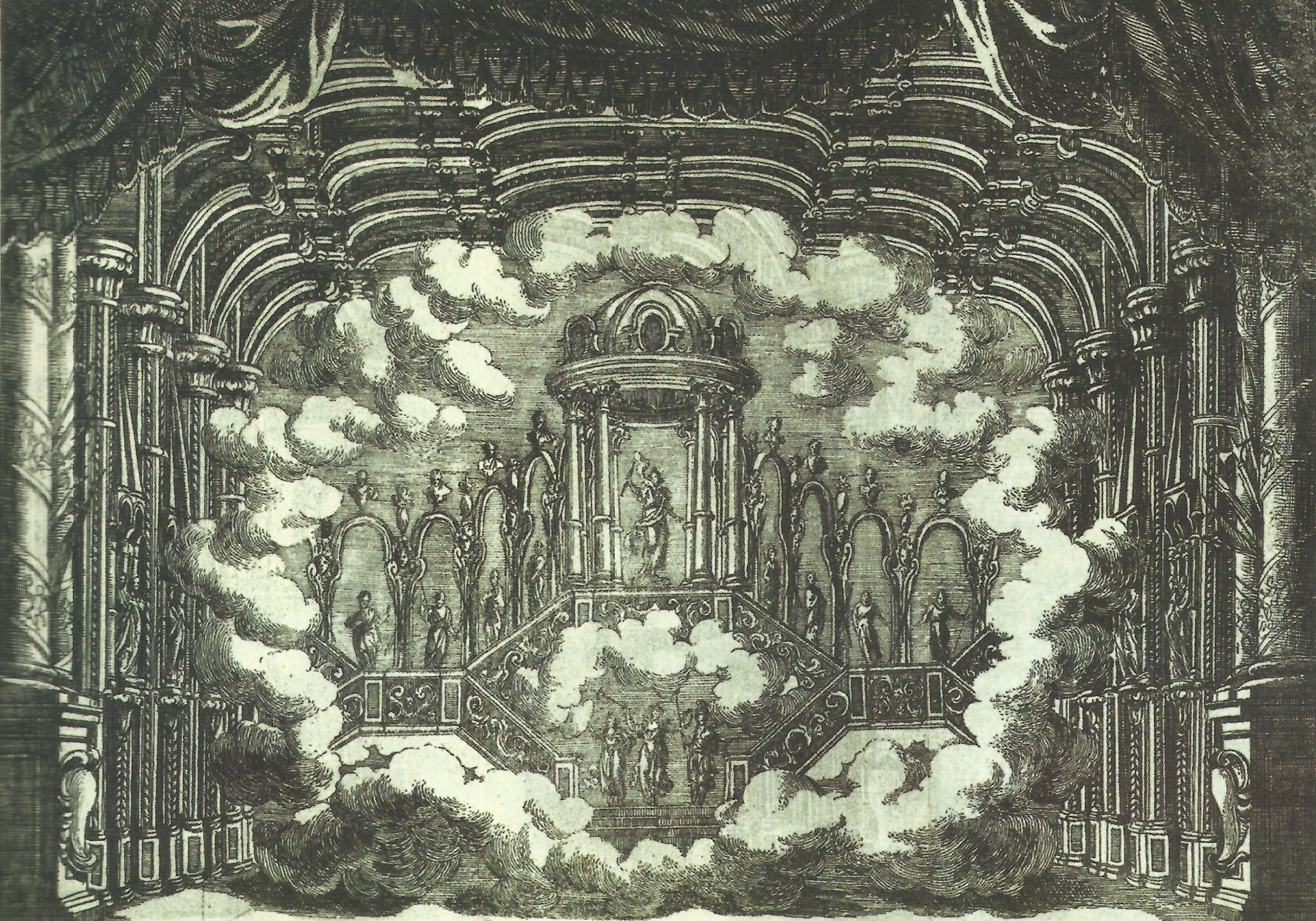

== Events ==
- In Britain, William Boyce is appointed Master of the King's Musick.
- After a tour of Ireland fraught with disagreements, Thomas Arne and his wife, the soprano Cecilia Young, agree to separate.
- Ferdinando Bertoni becomes choirmaster at the Ospedale dei Mendicanti in Venice.

== Published popular music ==
- James Oswald – [48] Airs for the Spring/Summer/Autumn/Winter, for violin or flute and basso continuo (London)
- Mme Papavoine – Nous voici donc au jour de l'an. Étrennes (Paris)

== Classical music ==
- Charles Avison – Eight Concertos, Op. 4 (London)
- Carl Philipp Emanuel Bach
  - Harpsichord Concerto in F major, H.443 Wq. 33
  - Keyboard Concerto in G major, H.444 Wq. 34
  - Flute Concerto in G major, H.445 Wq. 169
  - Trio Sonata in B-flat major, H.587 Wq. 159
  - Symphony in D major, H.651 Wq. 176
- Gaspard Fritz – 6 Violin Sonatas (published in Paris as Sei sonate, Op. 3, in 1756)
- Francesco Geminiani – Six Concertos, Op. 2, second edition, corrected and enlarged, with some new movements, by the author, and now published in score (London: John Johnson); originally published 1732
- Carl Heinrich Graun – Der Tod Jesu
- Leopold Mozart – Divertimento in F major "Musical Sleigh Ride"
- John Christopher Smith – Six Suits [sic] of Lessons for the Harpsichord, Op. 3 (London: John Walsh)
- Georg Philipp Telemann – Der Tod Jesu TWV 5:6

== Opera ==
- Johann Friedrich Agricola – Il tempio d'amore
- Pierre Montan Berton – Deucalion et Pyrrha
- Egidio Duni – L'Olimpiade
- Baldassare Galuppi
  - La diavolessa
  - Le nozze di Dorina (premiered Nov. in Venice)
- Carl Heinrich Graun – Montezuma (libretto by King Frederick the Great, composed 1754 first performed Jan. 6, 1755)
- Johann Adolph Hasse – Ezio (Final version premiered Jan. 20 in Dresden)
- Niccolò Jommelli – Pelope
- Antonio Mazzoni – Antigono (Was not performed because of the Lisbon Earthquake, premiered in 2011)
- John Christopher Smith – The Fairies

== Methods and theory writings ==
- Touissant Bordet – Méthode raisonnée pour apprendre la musique
- Marianus Königsperger – Der wohl-unterwiesene Clavier-Schüler
- Friedrich Wilhelm Marpurg – Anleitung zum Clavierspielen
- Christoph Nichelmann – Die Melodie
- Johann Joachim Quantz – Autobiography
- Jean-Philippe Rameau – Erreurs sur la musique dans l'Encyclopédie
- Georg Andreas Sorge – Ausweichungs-Tabellen

== Births ==
- January 16 – Maria Theresia Ahlefeldt, composer (died 1810)
- February 5 – Caroline Müller, operatic mezzo-soprano, actress and dancer (died 1826)
- March 2 – Antoine-Frédéric Gresnick, opera composer (died 1799)
- April 16 – Louise-Élisabeth Vigée-Le Brun, copyist and painter (died 1842)
- May 12 – Giovanni Battista Viotti (died 1824)
- June 1 – Federigo Fiorillo, arranger and composer (died 1823)
- June 18 – Louise-Rosalie Lefebvre, operatic mezzo-soprano, actress and dancer (died 1821)
- August 1 – Antonio Capuzzi, composer and violinist (died 1818)
- November 8 – Edmond de Favières, French librettist (died 1837)
- November 10 – Franz Anton Ries, violinist (died 1846)
- November 30 – Agnieszka Truskolaska, opera singer (died 1831)
- date unknown – John Christopher Moller, early American composer (died 1803)

== Deaths ==
- January 11 – Joseph-Nicolas-Pancrace Royer, harpsichordist and composer (born c.1705)
- January 15 – Azzolino Bernardino Della Ciaja, Italian composer (born 1671)
- January 19 – Jean-Pierre Christin, scientist and musician (born 1683)
- April – Anastasia Robinson, operatic soprano (born c.1692)
- April 30 – Jean-Baptiste Oudry, composer and painter (born 1686)
- June 21 – Giovanni Porta, opera composer (born c.1675)
- July 4 – John Cennick, hymn-writer (born 1718)
- July 6 – Pietro Paolo Bencini, Italian composer and Kapellmeister (born c.1670)
- July 9 – Gottlob Harrer, German composer and choir leader (born 1703)
- September 30 – Francesco Durante, composer (born 1684)
- October 4 – Sir John Clerk, 2nd Baronet, of Penycuik, composer (born 1676)
- October 28 – Joseph Bodin de Boismortier (born 1689)
- November 25 – Johann Georg Pisendel, composer (born 1687)
- December 1 – Maurice Greene, organist and composer (born 1696)
- December 8 – Jean-Baptiste Stuck, cellist and composer (born 1680)
- date unknown
  - José Elías, composer and organist (born c. 1678)
  - Alexander Gordon, antiquary and singer (born c.1692)
  - Manuel de Zumaya, Mexican composer (born c.1678)
