= Nicolas Chédeville =

French composer and musette maker (1705–1782)

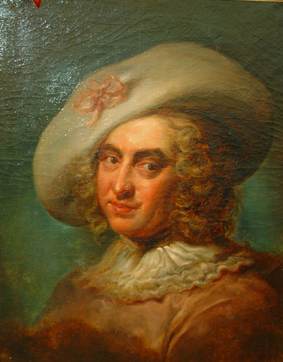
Nicolas Chédeville, painting by Aléxis Grimou.

Nicolas Chédeville (20 February 1705 – 6 August 1782) was a French composer, musette player and musette maker.

== Biography ==
Nicolas Chédeville was born in Serez, Normandy; musicians Pierre Chédeville (1694–1725) and Esprit Philippe Chédeville (1696–1762) were his brothers. Louis Hotteterre was his great uncle and godfather, and may have given him instruction in music and turning instruments. He began playing the oboe and musette (a bagpipe-like instrument commonly used in French baroque music) in the Paris Opera orchestra in the 1720s. After Jean Hotteterre's death in 1732, he took over his post in Les Grands Hautbois, the royal oboe band. He retired from the opera in July 1748, though returned occasionally to play the musette there. When he was nearly 70, he married the younger daughter of a valet who had once worked for the Duc d'Orléans, and was still describing himself as musette player to the king. In his last years he experienced financial difficulties. His ten houses were signed over to creditors in 1774, following which he separated from his wife. He resigned from Les Grands Hautbois in 1777, petitioned for bankruptcy in 1778 and died in Paris four years later. Lawyers were still trying to settle his affairs in 1790.

Jean-Benjamin de la Borde called him "the most celebrated musette player France had ever had", though he mistakenly held the opinion that he was dead by 1780, two years before he met his end. He taught the musette to Princess Victoire from about 1750, and became a popular teacher among the aristocracy, eventually attaining the title of maître de musette des Mesdames de France. He was also a musette maker, and extended the instrument's compass in the bass down to c' (middle C).

== Works ==
Chédeville's compositions were intended for the amusement and pleasure of wealthy amateur musicians; the French aristocracy of the time found pleasure in playing rustic instruments while living a romantic fantasy of peasant life (before the French Revolution presented a rather different perspective).

His first published works were collections of pieces for musette or hurdy-gurdy, entitled Amusements champêtres (pastoral amusements), published in December 1729. He called himself 'Chedeville le jeune', and in later compositions referred to himself as 'Chedeville le cadet'. Another collection of Amusements champêtres followed, which were of a more advanced technical and musical substance. Some variety was found in op. 6, with pieces named after battles and expressing 'war-like images'; it was inspired by a military campaign he had gone on with the Prince of Conti. He turned briefly to more serious music with Italian influences in op. 7, which is his only collection written specifically for the flute, oboe or violin.

=== Impersonation of Vivaldi ===
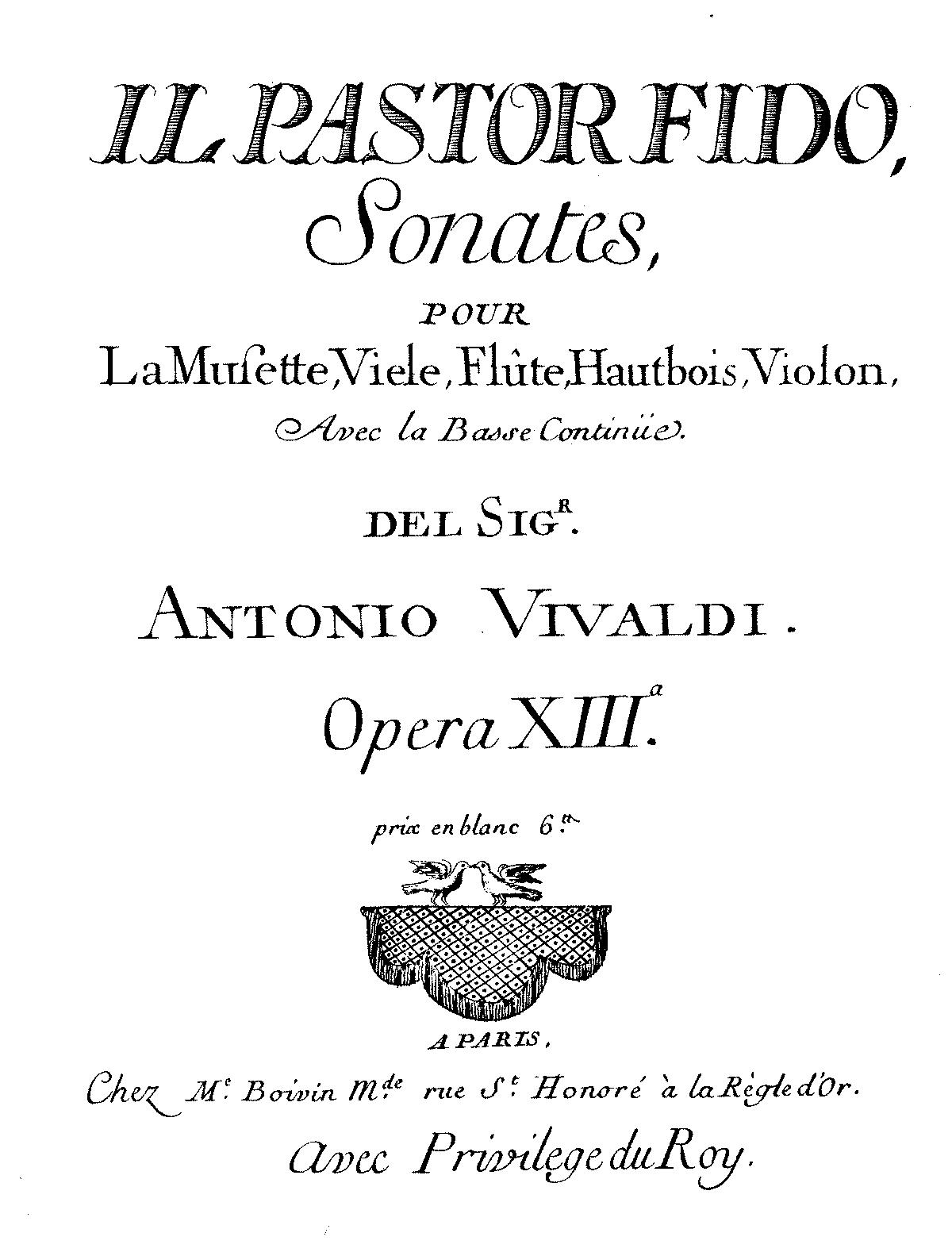
Title page of Chedeville's ″Il pastor fido, Antonio Vivaldi. Opera XIII"(1737)

In 1737 he made a secret agreement with his cousin Jean-Noël Marchand to publish a collection of his own compositions as Antonio Vivaldi's op. 13, entitled Il pastor fido. Chédeville supplied the money and received the profits, all of which was attested to in a notarial act by Marchand in 1749. This may have been an attempt to give his instrument, the musette, the endorsement of a great composer which it lacked. (Whether Vivaldi was ever aware of the fraud is unknown; there is no record of him lodging any complaint against either Chédeville or Marchand, and he was already dead by the time of Marchand's notarised deposition.) Vivaldi scholars had doubted the authenticity of Il pastor fido since at least the 1950s, but the forgery was only conclusively proven by French musicologist Philippe Lescat in 1989.

Chédeville's interest in Italian music led to his receiving, in August 1739, a privilege to publish arrangements for the musette, hurdy-gurdy or flute of concertos and sonatas by ten specific Italian composers, in addition to Johann Joachim Quantz and Antoine Mahaut. Le printems, ou Les saisons amusantes (1739) is a particularly amusing result of this privilege; it is an arrangement of Vivaldi's The Four Seasons for hurdy-gurdy or musette, violin, and flute (though the French flute could also mean the recorder). He replaced Vivaldi's original Summer with his op. 8 no. 9 concerto, transferred the middle movement of Winter to Autumn, and replaced Winter op. 8 no. 12. All this was quite freely arranged and combined with some added Vivaldian material by Chédeville.

== Compositions ==
Published in Paris. All solo works are accompanied by continuo. '/' indicates alternative instrumentation.

=== Opuses ===
- Op.[1]: Amusements champêtres, livre 1er (1729); for 1 and 2 musettes/hurdy-gurdies.
- Op.[2]: Amusements champêtres, livre 2e (1731); for 1 and 2 musettes/hurdy-gurdies/flutes/oboes.
- Op.[3]: Troisième livre d'amusements champêtres (1733); for musette/hurdy-gurdy/flute/oboe/violin.
- Op.4: Les danses amuzantes mellées de vaudeville (1733); for 2 musettes/hurdy-gurdies/flutes/oboes/violin.
- Op.5: Sonates amusantes (1734); for 1 and 2 musettes/hurdy-gurdies/flutes/oboes/violin.
- Op.6: Amusemens de Bellone, ou Les plaisirs de Mars (1736); for 1 and 2 musettes/hurdy-gurdies/flutes/oboes.
- Op.7: 6 sonates (1739); for flute/oboe/violin.
- Op.8: Les galanteries amusantes (1739); for 2 musettes/hurdy-gurdies/flutes/violins.
- Op.9: Les Deffis, ou L'étude amusante; for musette/hurdy-gurdy.
- Op.10: Les idées françoises, ou Les délices de Chambray (1750); for 2 musettes/hurdy-gurdies/flutes/oboes/violins.
- Op.11: lost
- Op.12: Les impromptus de Fontainebleau (1750); for 2 musettes/hurdy-gurdies/violins/pardessus de viole/flutes/oboes.
- Op.13: lost
- Op.14: Les variations amusantes: pièces de différents auteurs ornés d'agrémens (includes variations on Les folies d'Espagne); for 2 musettes/hurdy-gurdies/pardessus de viole/flutes/oboes.

=== Arrangements and other works ===
- Il pastor fido, sonates ... del sigr Antonio Vivaldi [by Nicolas Chédeville] (1737); for musette/hurdy-gurdy/flute/oboe/violin.
- LE PRINTEMS / ou / LES SAISONS / AMUSANTES / concertos / DANTONIO VIVALDY / Mis pour les Musettes et Vielles / avec accompagnement de Violon / Fluste et Basse continue. / PAR M^{R} CHEDEVILLE LE CADET / Hautbois De la Chambre du Roy / et Muſette ordinaire De l'Academie Royalle / De Muſique. Opera ottava. [arrangement of Vivaldi's The Four Seasons by Nicolas Chédeville] (1739); for musette/hurdy-gurdy, violin, flute, and continuo.
- La feste d'Iphise [arrangement of airs from Montéclair's Jephté] (1742); for 2 musettes/hurdy-gurdies.
- Les pantomimes italiennes dansées à l'Académie royale de musique (1742); for 1 and 2 musettes/hurdy-gurdies/flutes/oboes.
- Nouveaux menuets champêtres; for musette/hurdy-gurdy/violin/flute/oboe.
- [Dall']Abaco, op.4, arrangement for musette/hurdy-gurdy/flute/oboe.
- La feste de Cleopatre (1751); for 2 musettes/hurdy-gurdies.
