= Hotteterre =

Hotteterre may refer to:

- Jacques-Martin Hotteterre, French composer and flautist
- Jean Hotteterre, French composer
