= Maria de Croll =

Swedish singer

Maria de Croll, née Swart (died 3 November 1710) was a Swedish vocalist. She was singer of the first rank at Hovkapellet 1702-1710.

Maria de Croll was married to Reinhold de Croll, organist at the Hovkapellet. She was the first female employed at the Hovkapellet. However, she was not officially counted as the first woman there, as the royal orchestra were formally banned for female members until 26 October 1726, when Sophia Schröder and Judith Fisher became the first women formally employed at Hovkapellet after it was officially opened for women. Maria de Croll was also one of two females employed at the Hovkapellet during the ban of females, the other one being the vocalist Anna Maria Ristell in 1714-1716. In 1710, she became one of the many victims of the 1710–1713 plague of Sweden.
