= 1757 in music =

The year 1757 in music involved some significant compositions.

== Events ==
- None listed

== Classical music ==
- Thomas Arne – 7 Trio Sonatas, Op. 3
- Carl Philipp Emanuel Bach
  - Keyboard Sonata in D minor, H.38
  - Fugue in A major, H.101
  - Keyboard Sonata in D minor, H.105
  - Keyboard Sonata in G major, H.119
  - L'Auguste, H.122
  - La Xénophone et La Sybille, H.123
- Georg Benda – 6 Harpsichord Sonatas
- Anna Bon – 6 Harpsichord Sonatas, Op. 2
- Louis-Claude Daquin – Livre de Noëls
- Johann Friedrich Fasch – Serenata Fwv B: 4 \ Beglückter Tag (written for the birthday of Catherine the Great)
- Carl Heinrich Graun – Te Deum, GraunWV B:VI:2
- George Frideric Handel – The Triumph of Time and Truth
- Joseph Haydn – String Quartets, Op.2 (written between 1757 and 1762)
- Johann Gottlieb Janitsch – Sonata da Camera in D major, Op.5
- Leopold Mozart – Concerto for Trombone in G major
- Charles Noblet – Nouvelles suittes [sic] de pièces de clavecin et trois sonates
- Giovanni Battista Serini
  - Keyboard Sonata in B-flat major
  - Keyboard Sonata in C major
  - Keyboard Sonata in E major
- Georg Philipp Telemann – Lyksalig Tvillung-Rige!, TWV 12:10

== Opera ==
- Florian Leopold Gassmann — Merope
- Pietro Alessandro Guglielmi — Lo solachianello imbroglione
- Niccolò Jommelli — Temistocle
- Jean-Philippe Rameau – L'enlèvement d'Adonis
- Giuseppe Scarlatti — La clemenza di Tito
- Tommaso Traetta – Didone abbandonata

== Methods and theory writings ==
- Giovanni Batista Martini – Storia della musica
- Friedrich Wilhelm Marpurg
  - Anfangsgründe der theoretischen Musik (Leipzig: Johann Gottlob Immanuel Breitkopf)
  - Handbuch bey dem Generalbasse und der Composition (Berlin: Gottlieb August Lange)
- Nicolo Pasquali – Thorough-Bass Made Easy
- Jean-Philippe Rameau – Réponse de M. Rameau à MM. les éditeurs de l'Encyclopédie sur leur dernier avertissement

== Births ==
- January 28 – Antonio Bartolomeo Bruni, composer (died 1821)
- January 29 – Lazare Rameau, composer (died 1794)
- February 17 – Antonio Calegari, composer (died 1828)
- April 22 – Alessandro Rolla, violinist, composer and music teacher (died 1841)
- May 27 – Caroline von Brandenstein, composer (died 1813)
- June 18 – Ignaz Pleyel, composer and piano-maker (died 1831)
- August 21 – Joseph Franz Ratschky, librettist (died 1810)
- September 6 – August Friedrich Ernst Langbein, German humorist and lyricist (died 1835)
- November 28 – William Blake, poet and lyricist (died 1827)
- date unknown
  - Osip Kozlovsky, composer (died 1831)
  - Alessandro Pepoli, librettist (died 1796)

== Deaths ==
- February 11 – Mauro D’Alay, composer and violinist (born 1687)
- February 25 – Paolo Benedetto Bellinzani, composer (born c. 1690)
- March 20 – Johann Paul Kunzen, composer (born 1696)
- March 27 – Johann Stamitz, violinist and composer (born 1717)
- July 23 – Domenico Scarlatti, composer (born 1685)
- August 11 – Jose Pradas Gallen, composer
- September 28 – Andrea Zani, violinist and composer (born 1696) (carriage accident)
- October 11 – Zacharias Hildebrandt, organ builder (born 1688)
- November 8 – Pierre Prowo, composer
- date unknown
  - Lodovico Filippo Laurenti, composer (born 1693)
  - Balthasar Siberer, organ teacher (born 1679)
- probable – Jean-Baptiste Masse, cellist and composer (born c. 1700)
