= Philibert Delavigne =

French composer

Philibert Delavigne (c. 1700–1750) was a French composer. Little is known of his life, except that he was active at the court of Louis XV and entered the service of the Comte d'Ayen around 1730.

Only three sets of compositions by Delavigne survive:

- op. 1 Six Suites (Paris, 1731)
- op. 2 [6] Sonates: Original title: "Sonates pour la Musette, Vielle, Flute-a-bec, Traversiere, Hautbois etc. Avec la Basse par Mr. De Lavigne II. Oeuvre"

Titles for those sonatas are as follows: 1. "La Baussan" (C major) 2. "La d'Agut" (C minor) 3. "La Dubois" (C major) 4. "La Beaumont" (C major) 5. "La Persan" (G major) 6. "La Simianne" (G major)

- op. 4 Les Fleurs, 24 pièces

All these compositions are described in their full titles as suitable for musette de cour, hurdy-gurdy and recorder violin or transverse flute. Robert A. Green explains that the composer's preference was always shown by the exact order in which the instruments are named. According to this principle, Delavigne's surviving works were composed for musette even though they remain eminently accessible for the hurdy-gurdy.
