= Sophia Schröder =

18th-century Swedish soprano

Sophia Schröder (Stockholm, 1712 – 29 January 1750) was a Swedish soprano, active as a concert vocalist at the royal orchestra, the Kungliga Hovkapellet, at the royal Swedish court, the first of her gender to have been officially given such a position.

== Life ==
Sophia Schröder was born in Stockholm to German immigrants. On 26 October 1726, females were formally allowed to be employed at Kungliga Hovkapellet by a new direction from the monarch, although females had in fact unofficially been active at the Hovkapellet starting since Maria de Croll in 1702. The same year females were officially admitted, Schröder and her colleague Judith Fischer were formally employed as vocalists, and the following year, they replaced the two boys previously serving as sopranos. Together, they became historical as the first of their gender to have been officially employed in the then two-hundred-year-old history of the royal orchestra. They were additionally the first official female court singers at the Swedish court since Anne Chabanceau de La Barre. Both Schröder and Fisher had in fact been active as vocalists at the orchestra before they were officially hired.

Sophia Schröder was a court singer, and performed for the royal court at various occasions as well as at the performances of the orchestra. From 1731, the royal orchestra also performed at public concerts at Riddarhuset in Stockholm. She was a student of Anders von Düben, Casper Gottlob Grünwaldt, Frans Hindrich Meyer, Johan Helmich Roman, Conrad Arnoldi, and Jacob Dedering. Anders von Düben gave her a high recommendation as a student in the musical science.

Sophia Schröder remained unmarried and kept her position as vocalist until her death in 1750. When her colleague Judith Fisher left the orchestra after her marriage in 1740, she was replaced by Schröder's sister Gustaviana Schröder. They were followed by five more women in the orchestra during the Age of Liberty. In 1751, two female vocalists from the royal orchestra, Hedvig Witte and Cecilia Elisabeth Würzer, performed at the burial of King Frederick I of Sweden.

== See also ==
- Marie Pauline Åhman
- Hovsångare

== Sources ==
- Anna Ivarsdotter Johnsson och Leif Jonsson: Musiken i Sverige. Frihetstiden och Gustaviansk tid 1720-1810 (Music in Sweden. Age of liberty and the Gustavian age 1720–1810) (Swedish)
- Leif Jonsson, Ann-Marie Nilsson och Greger Andersson: Musiken i Sverige. Från forntiden till stormaktstidens slut 1720 (Music in Sweden. From Ancient times to the end of Empire)(Swedish)
- Gunhild Karle (Swedish): Kungl. Hovmusiken i Stockholm och dess utövare 1697-1771 (The Music and Musicians of the Royal Court in Stockholm in 1697–1771), TryckJouren, Uppsala 2002. ISBN 91-631-2152-2.
