= Gustaviana Schröder =

Gustaviana Schröder (1701 – 30 May 1763) was a Swedish court singer and member of the Kungliga Hovkapellet from 1740 to 1763. She was one of five women to have been official members of the Royal Orchestra in the Age of Liberty.

== Life ==
Schröder was born in Stockholm by parents who immigrated from Germany before her birth. She was the sister of Sophia Schröder, who alongside Judith Fischer became the first female to be officially employed at the Royal orchestra in 1726. When Judith Fischer retired in 1740, she was given the vacant position in the orchestra, "in recognition of her dedication and skill in music which she had performed in many years for the chapel without compensation."

She was one of only five women to be officially inducted in the Royal Orchestra during the age of liberty, and one of three, alongside Judith Fischer and Sophia Schröder, to be given her salary from the funds of the royal orchestra, in contrast to Hedvig Witte and Cecilia Elisabeth Würzer, who were paid unofficially and from the king's private fund respectively.

Gustaviana Schröder remained unmarried and was employed at the chapel until her death. In 1746, the director of the royal orchestra, Carl Gustaf von Düben described her as "still the best voice in the Royal Orchestra". Among her performances were a duet with hovsångare Andreas Erhardt performed at the inauguration of the predecessor of the Drottningholm Palace Theatre in 1754.
