= Cecilia Elisabeth Würzer =

Swedish singer

Cecilia Elisabeth Würzer (d. 10 April 1761), was a Swedish (originally German) singer and member of the Kungliga Hovkapellet in 1743-1761. She was one of five women to have been officially members of the Royal Orchestra in the Age of Liberty.

Würzer came to Sweden from Germany in 1743 as a member of the Musical company employed by Adolf Frederick, King of Sweden. She was one of only five women to be officially inducted in the Royal Orchestra during the Age of Liberty. However, unlike Judith Fischer, Sophia Schröder and Gustaviana Schröder, she and Hedvig Witte were in fact never paid from the funds of the royal orchestra; Witte was unofficially paid while Würzer was given her salary from the personal funds of Adolf Frederick. Cecilia Elisabeth Würzer were particularly noted for her performance at the funeral of Frederick I of Sweden, when she sang a part written by Johan Helmich Roman with her colleague Eleonora Witte.
