= Louis-August Papavoine =

French violinist and composer

Louis-August Papavoine was a French violinist and composer. His first name is uncertain, as is his birth and death information. He is believed to have been born in Normandy about 1720, and probably died in Marseille about 1793. In 1752, he published Six simphonies op.1, dedicated to "le Marquis de la Bourdonnaye, Conseiller d'État, Intendant de Rouen." From 1756 to 1758, he wrote orchestral and chamber works.

In 1761, his opera Les deux amies, ou le vieux garçon, also known as Le Vieux Coquet, ou les deux amies, the earliest known operatic adaptation of William Shakespeare's The Merry Wives of Windsor, premiered in Paris. According to Winton Dean, it was "killed by its libretto after one performance."

== Personal life ==
About 1754, Papavoine married a musician and composer surnamed Pellecier, who became known as Mme Papavoine. They may have been the parents of Jean-Noël Papavoine, a maître des pantomimes et répétiteur active in Lille and The Hague.
