= Violin Sonatas, K. 6–9 (Mozart) =

Sonatas for violin and keyboard (1762–1764) by W. A. Mozart

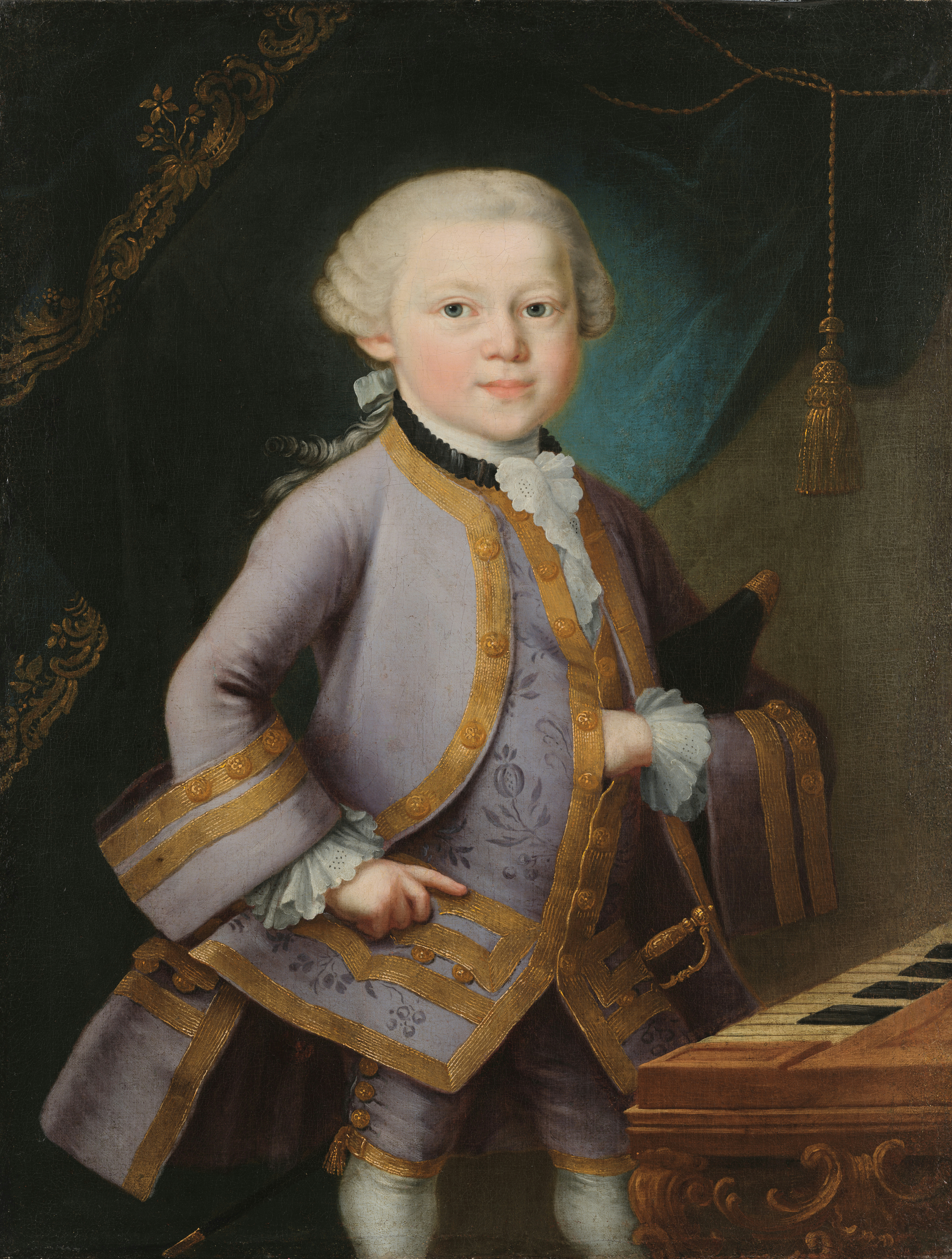
1763 Mozart portrait

Wolfgang Amadeus Mozart's first four sonatas for keyboard and violin, K. 6–9 are among his earliest works, composed between 1762 and 1764. They encompass several of Mozart's firsts as a composer: for example, his first works incorporating the violin, his first works with more than a single instrument, his first works in more than one movement and his first works in sonata form. In fact, previous to this, all his works had been short solo-pieces for the harpsichord.

Mozart was between 6 and 8 years of age when he composed these works; hence it is believed by many that it was written down for the boy by his father, Leopold: all four of these early sonatas are preserved in Leopold's handwriting.

All of Mozart's early violin sonatas are really keyboard sonatas with violin accompaniment, a fact which is made clear from the original title of the four sonatas K. 6–9: Sonates pour le clavecin qui peuvent se jouer avec l'accompagnement de violon [Sonatas for the harpsichord, which may be played with violin accompaniment]. It is quite legitimate, therefore, to perform these works on a keyboard alone.

In composing these early sonatas, Mozart may have been influenced by the German keyboard player and composer Johann Schobert, who was living and working in Paris when the Mozarts arrived there in November 1763. Schobert, in fact, had already published a number of keyboard sonatas with violin accompaniment, which possibly served as models for the young Mozart.

== Sonata in C major, K. 6 ==
The precise date and location of composition is disputed: some suggest that it was written in Salzburg, the boy's home town, in 1762 or 1763; others suggest that it was written in Paris in 1763 or 1764, during Mozart's first visit to that city. It was published in Paris in February 1764, along with another violin sonata, K. 7, as Mozart's Opus 1.

K. 6 has four movements, the third being a pair of menuets:

1. Allegro
2. Andante, in F major
3. Menuet I and II (II in F major)
4. Allegro molto

The keyboard and violin interact in various ways throughout the piece: the violin echoing the tune of the keyboard, the two moving in synchronicity. The violin sometimes doubles the tune while the keyboard provides the bass. It is quite a lively and light-hearted work. Mozart employs Alberti bass throughout the entire sonata.

The Nannerl Notenbuch contains versions for solo piano of the first three movements of this sonata. It is thought that the first and second of these movements and the Menuet I from the third movement were inscribed in the Notenbuch by Leopold in Brussels in 1763. A version for solo piano of Menuet II (together with a piano version of the third movement of Leopold's Serenade in D) can also be found in Leopold's hand in the Notenbuch with the comment, "di Wolfgango Mozart d. 16^{ten} Julÿ 1762" [by Wolfgang Mozart on 16 July 1762]; Mozart was in Salzburg on that date.

== Sonata in D major, K. 7 ==
The work was published during the Mozart family's grand tour of Europe in Paris in January 1764. Along with the K. 6 sonata, Mozart's father Leopold published them as Wolfgang's Opus 1 and had them dedicated to Princess Victoire of France. A later set of sonatas, in 1777–78, was also published as Opus 1.

The sonata is in of D major and is set in three movements:

1. Allegro molto
2. Adagio, in G major
3. Menuet I and II, II in D minor

== Sonata in B♭ major, K. 8 ==
Composed in late 1763 and published in 1764 in Paris as Op. 2, No. 1. A solo-keyboard version of the first movement appears in the Nannerl Notenbuch as "Allegro in B♭".

1. Allegro
2. Andante grazioso, in F major
3. Menuet I and II, II in B♭ minor

== Sonata in G major, K. 9 ==
Composed and published in 1764 in Paris as Op. 2, No. 2.

1. Allegro spiritoso
2. Andante, in C major
3. Menuet I and II, II in G minor

Mozart reused a melody from the minuet in the slow movement of the Symphony in D, K. 95/73n (sometimes labelled as No. 45).

== Recordings ==
- 1975 – Gérard Poulet (violin), Blandine Verlet (harpsichord) – Philips
- 2004 – Rachel Podger (violin), Gary Cooper (fortepiano) – Channel Classics
