= Missa secundi toni (Eberlin) =

Mass by Johann Ernst Eberlin

- Mass by Johann Ernst Eberlin
- Text: Mass ordinary
- Language: Latin
- Movements: nine
- Vocal: SATB choir and soloists
- Instrumental: 2 violins, continuo

The Missa secundi toni (Mass in the second tone) is a mass by Johann Ernst Eberlin. He wrote it for the Salzburg Cathedral, and scored it for four soloists, a four-part choir, two violins and continuo.

The mass is structured in nine movements. The following table is based on the vocal score by Coppenrath, listing tempo markings (showing those added by the publisher in brackets) and time signature.

Part	Marking	Time
Kyrie	Vivace	common time
Christe	(Moderato)	3/4
Gloria	(Vivace)	common time
Credo	(Vivace)	3/4
Sanctus	(Moderato, Allegro)	3/4
Benedictus	(Andante)	common time
Hosanna	(Allegro)	3/4
Agnus Dei	Adagio	common time
Dona	(Allegro)	3/4

Eberlin uses mostly the choir. Christe is a duet for soprano and alto, Benedictus a duet for tenor and bass, otherwise the soloists have only short passages within the texture. Kyrie, choral throughout, is repeated after Christe.

In the Gloria, the soprano soloist begins "Gratias agimus tibi", later the alto soloist enters with "Dominus Rex", later the tenor "Deus fili", finally the bass "Domine Deus". The choir sings twice "Qui tollis", continued first by the soprano solo "miserere nobis", then by the lower voices in succession, singing "suscipe". The concluding Amen begins with the choral soprano and alto, leading to a lively polyphonic conclusion. The same Amen also ends the Credo.

The Sanctus is choral throughout. The basses begin with a solemn theme, which is imitated by tenor, alto and soprano. The call Agnus Dei is first sung by soprano solo, continued with a choral "miserere", secondly by tenor solo, continued similarly, and the third time by the choir in homophony. The call "Dona nobis pacem" is first sung by soprano solo, secondly by alto solo, both continued by the choir in dancing rhythm.

The mass was published by Alfred Coppenrath, around 1970. It was published by Carus in 2008, edited by Wolfgang Fürlinger.

== Sources ==
- Johann Ernst Eberlin / Missa secundi toni Carus-Verlag
- Johann Ernst Eberlin (record cover) flickr.com
