= Musette de cour =

Musical instrument of the bagpipe family

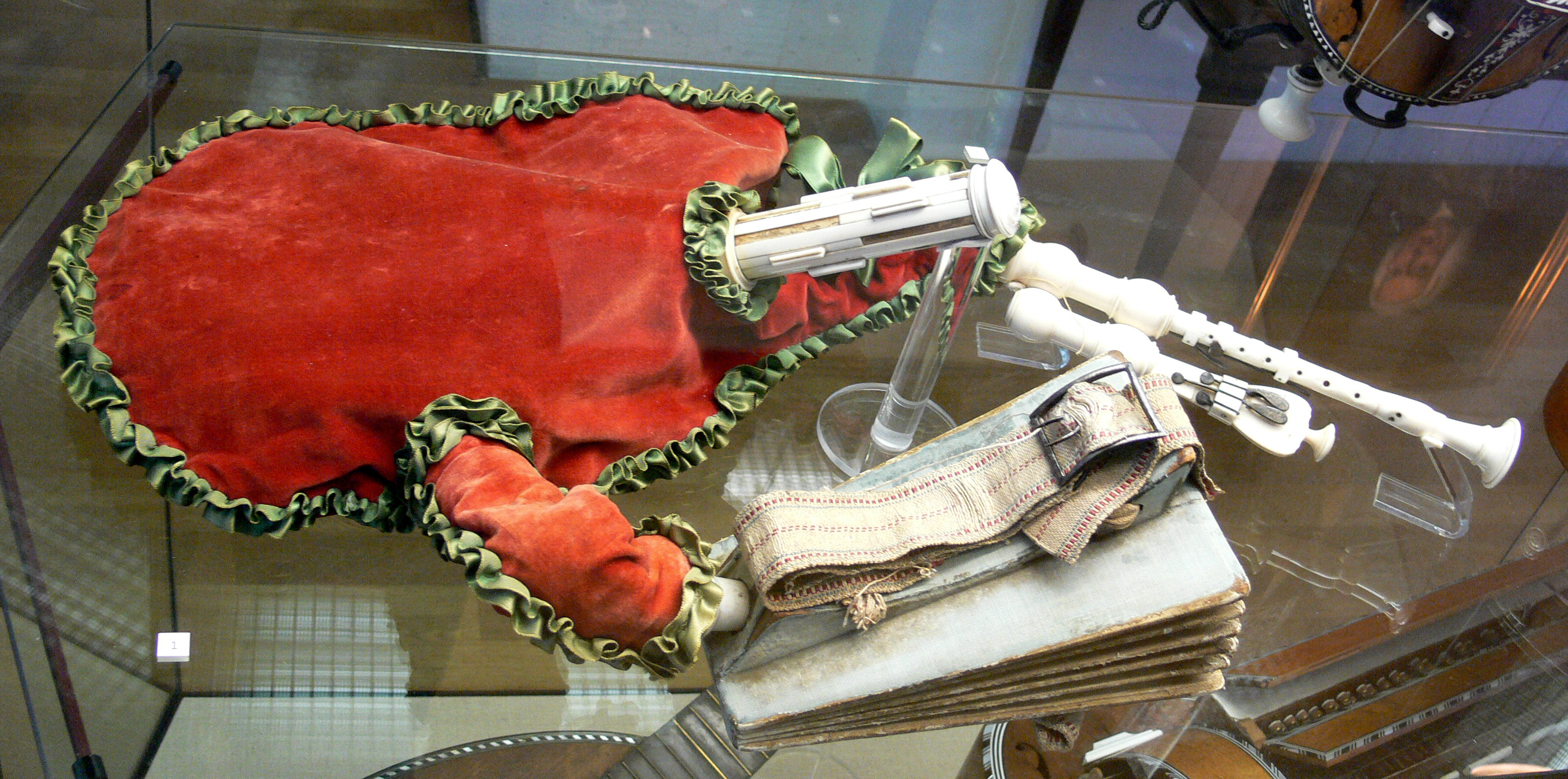
An 18th-century musette de cour on display at the Berlin Musical Instrument Museum, Germany

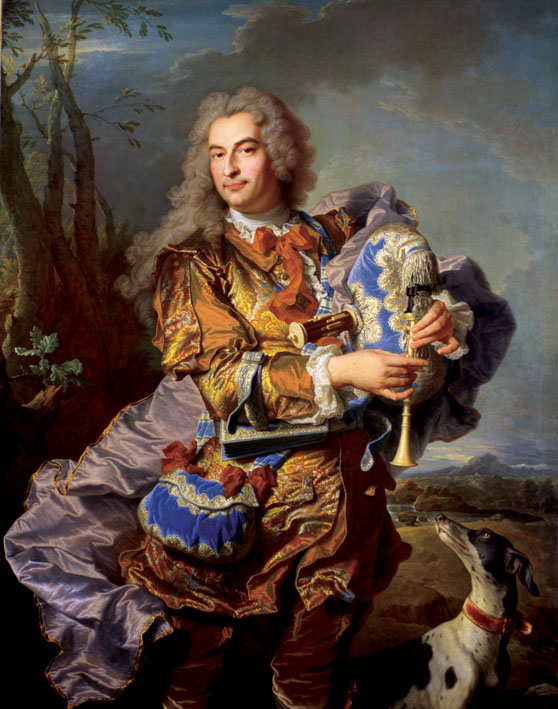
Gaspard de Gueidan playing the musette de cour, painting by Hyacinthe Rigaud, 1738, Musée Granet, Aix-en-Provence, France

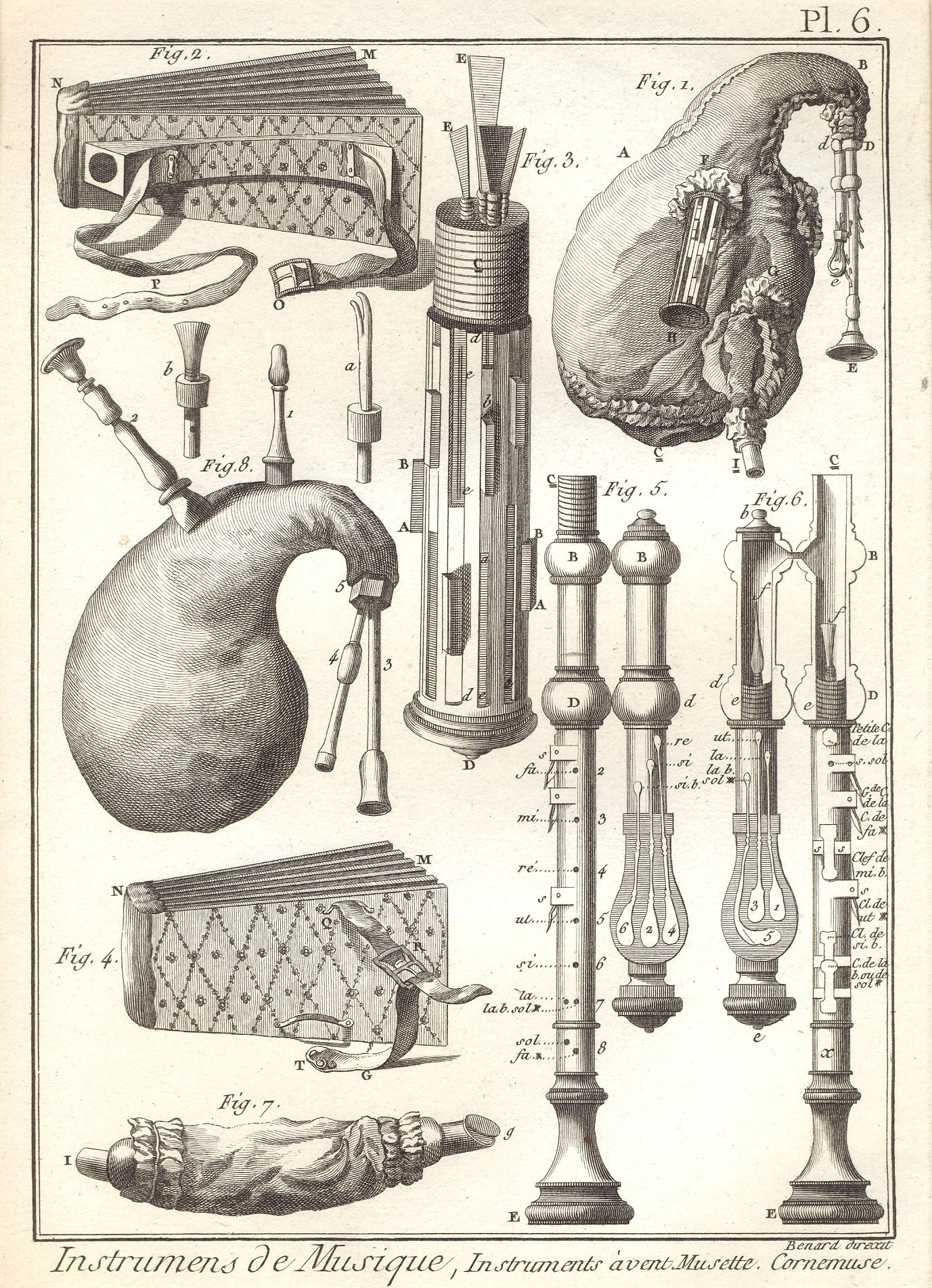
Drawing of the parts of the musette de cour from the Encyclopédie by Diderot and d'Alembert, ca. 1770

The musette de cour or baroque musette is a type of Baroque bagpipe. Visually, the musette is characterised by the short, cylindrical shuttle-drone and the two chalumeaux. Both the chanters and the drones have a cylindrical bore and use a double reed, giving a quiet tone similar to the oboe. The instrument is blown by a bellows.

The qualification "de cour" does not appear in the name for the instrument in original musical scores; title-pages usually refer to it simply as a musette, allowing occasional confusion with the piccolo oboe, also known as the (oboe) musette.

== History ==
First appearing in France, at the very end of the sixteenth century, the musette was refined over the next hundred years by a number of instrument-making families. The best-known contributions came from the Hotteterre family: Martin Hotteterre added a second chanter, the petit chalumeau, extending the instrument's range by six semitones. The bourdon, originally designed to accompany essentially modal music, became simpler as the chalumeaux became more complicated. The final form of the musette is fully chromatic, with a range of an octave and half starting from F above middle C; the bourdon provides drones for C, D and G.

The qualification de cour refers to the instrument's connection with the French court and aristocracy of the early seventeenth century. "Exotic" - in the sense of imported or out of place - elements were fashionable, resulting in the appearance of traditional instruments such as bagpipe, hurdy-gurdy and galoubet in compositions for professionals and amateurs alike. The musette may well have benefited from being a bellows-blown instrument, too; it was generally considered unseemly for women to play any mouth-blown instrument. Borjon de Scellery, however, does explicitly identify grimacing and pulling faces as a habit of ill-trained musette-players.

At the height of its popularity, the musette (like the hurdy-gurdy) was used not just for chamber-music but also in larger-scale compositions such as operas, where it was associated with shepherds, peasants and other pastoral elements. After the French Revolution, the musette seems to have fallen rapidly out of favour while simpler forms of bagpipe remained popular as folk-instruments. As a result, musicologists examining French baroque music at the end of the 19th century found it difficult to imagine that what they took to be the same as a simple folk bagpipe could ever have had a place in highly sophisticated music for the court.

The "authentic performance" approach generally familiar from the 1970s onward, plus skillful restoration of original instruments by makers such as Rémi Dubois (Verviers, Belgium), has made it possible to hear works such as Chédeville's "Pastor Fido" (based on Vivaldi's "The Four Seasons"), chamber-music by Boismortier and even Rameau's opéra-ballet "Les Fêtes d'Hébé" in their original form.

== Chalumeaux (chanters) ==
The frontispiece in Borjon de Scellery's Traité (1672) shows a shepherd surrounded by a number of instruments. They include an early musette, with a single chalumeau that appears to have six finger-holes and no keys. The first full-page plate illustrates a chalumeau with seven finger-holes and three keys, giving a range of one octave.

The second full-page plate illustrates a more developed form of the musette, where a grand chalumeau with five keys is complemented by a petit chalumeau with six keys. Jacques Hotteterre's Méthode (1738) illustrates the most usual final form of the instrument; the six-key petit chalumeau is the same as de Scellery's, but the grand chalumeau now has seven keys.

The petit chalumeau, as already mentioned, was added by Martin Hotteterre. Though physically connected to the grand chalumeau and sharing the same stock in the bag, it has a separate reed and functions as an independent chanter. The lowest note on the petit chalumeau is an A flat a semi-tone below the higher A on the grand chalumeau, and keeping the two chalumeaux in tune and in balance is one of the difficulties of the instrument.

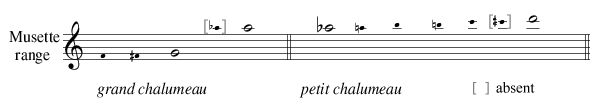
Range of chalumeaux on a Hotteterre-style musette

The grand chalumeau is open, so it always sounds. The petit chalumeau is closed, like the Northumbrian smallpipes, so it sounds only when a hole is opened or a key is pressed. The fingering system on both chalumeaux is "closed", meaning that (except while playing some ornaments) only one hole at a time is opened.

== Bourdons (drones) ==
Following the principle of the rackett and the bassoon, the short cylinder of the musette drone contains airways that double back on themselves. Openings in each airway (the equivalent of finger-holes) are uncovered by moving layettes (sliders) fixed in four coulisses (runners). The two lowest notes use the same airway, so cannot be played together.

The earliest musettes had up to nine coulisses and twelve layettes, so that you could play music in a range of modes and always have a drone using the home-note of the mode. As the chalumeaux developed and became fully chromatic, it became possible to play music in different modes but starting on the same note; fewer possible drone-notes were needed, and the bourdon was simplified. Even so, the bourdon still contains four or more separate reeds that have to be kept adjusted and in tune.

== Repertory ==
The musette was an instrument both for professionals, members of ensembles and orchestras in the court or noble households, and for amateurs. As a result, the music written for the instrument ranges from simple transcriptions of popular tunes – folk-dances in Borjon de Scellery's Traité, songs from current operas in Hotteterre's Méthode – to quite demanding pieces by the best-known composers of the day. The bulk of music written for the musette is not solo music; duos are the most popular form, followed by trio-sonatas. Much of the music available for the instrument was described as suitable for musette, hurdy-gurdy, recorder or transverse flute; or for all these plus oboe or violin. Modern editions, usually for recorder, give people the chance to discover a lot of musette music, though it needs the drone(s) to be heard as the composer intended.

Composers (in alphabetical order) include Bâton, Boismortier, Buterne, Chédeville (l'Ainé and le Cadet), Corrette, Delavigne, Hotteterre "le Romain", Naudot, and Rameau. Interest in the musette seems to have been confined almost exclusively to French composers, though the tranquil dance-form with the same name is more widespread. There are both Lyra (hurdy-gurdy) and Musette movements in Telemann orchestral suites, for example, and a Musette in the Anna Magdalena Bachbüchlein.

The Traité by Borjon de Scellery, while mentioning the petit chalumeau and including it in the illustrations, concentrates on the grand chalumeau and includes [mostly] dance-tunes and popular songs in its examples. The Méthode by Hotteterre covers the full range of the developed form of the instrument, and as well as examples taken from popular operas includes a number of original compositions designed to extend the player's skill in specific areas. Both these works also teach how to read music, de Scellery providing examples in standard notation and in musette tablature, and advice on basic maintenance. It is clear that they are expecting their readers to live in Paris or one of the largest provincial towns, where they will readily find instrument-makers and tutors to help them.

== Types ==
Musette de cour - Standard musette, goes down to f'

Musette d'amore - Pitched a third lower with range down to d'

Musette à ravalment - Lowest musette, going down to c'
