= Symphony No. 42 (Haydn) =

Symphony by Joseph Haydn

Joseph Haydn

The Symphony No. 42 in D major, Hoboken I/42, is a symphony by Joseph Haydn. The symphony was composed by 1771. It is scored for two oboes, two bassoons, two horns, and strings.

The work is in four movements:

1. Moderato e maestoso, 2/2
2. Andantino e cantabile, 3/8 in A major
3. Menuet & Trio: Allegretto, 3/4
4. Finale: Scherzando e presto, 2/4

The first movement "is marked by the lively acciaccature that appear in the first bar." Generally in this period, the winds were tacet for the slow movement, and here they are silent at first, but they come in later. The last movement has been described as a "novel use of the rondo form," and H. C. Robbins Landon even goes so far as to call it a "characteristic Haydnesque rondo" and perhaps the first such rondo, though others point out that it is not the sonata rondo that has come to be associated with Haydn. Poundie Burstein has discussed Haydn's use of cadence in this symphony.
