= Pauline Åhman =

Swedish harpist (1812–1904)

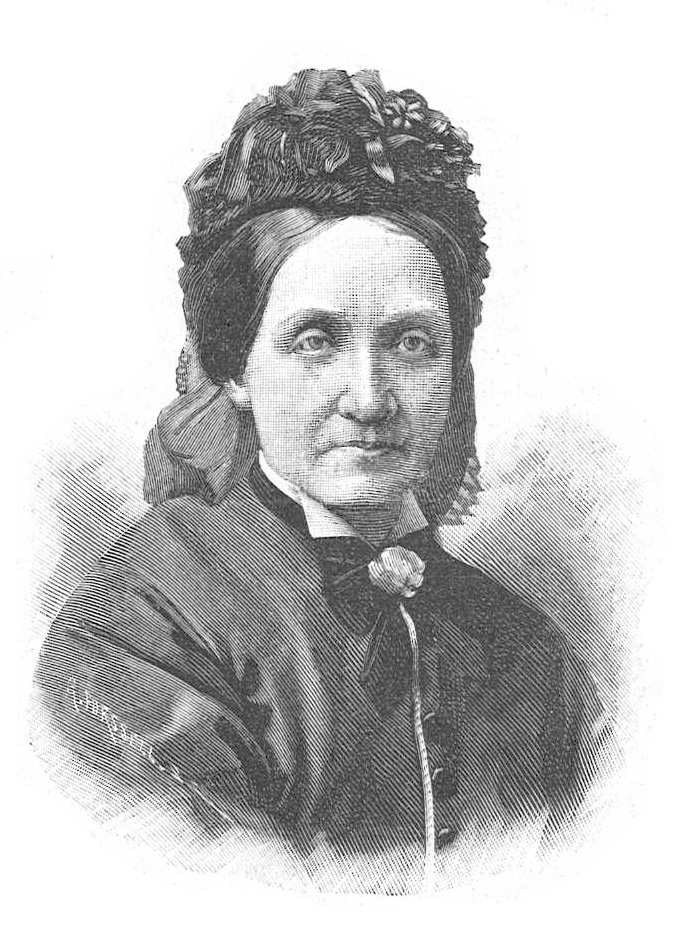
Pauline Åhman in 1892

Maria Paulina "Marie Pauline" Åhman (1812–1904), née Landby, was a Swedish harpist. She is known as the first known female musician employed at the Royal Swedish Chapel orchestra Kungliga Hovkapellet.

She was a student of the harp player Edward Pratté 1830–35 and was given a position in the royal chapel in 1850 (permanently in 1856). While women had been employed in the royal chapel as vocalists since the employment of Sophia Schröder in 1727, Åhman is the first known woman to have been employed as an instrumentalist. She kept her position until 1881 and was described as very able and dutiful. She retired with a royal pension. She also held public concerts and was in 1870–75 and 1887–91 active as a teacher at the Royal College of Music, Stockholm, where she had several famous students.

== See also ==
- Anna Lang
