= Charlotte von Brandenstein =

German composer

Charlotte von Brandenstein (1754–1813) was a German composer. She was born in Schorndorf and studied in Mannheim with Abbe Vogler. She died in Berlin.

Von Brandenstein composed mainly for piano and violin. Selected works include:

- Clavier Sonate in D
