= Jonathan Huntington =

American composer (1771–1838)

Jonathan Huntington was born in Windham, Connecticut November 17, 1771 and died in St. Louis, Missouri July 29, 1838. He was a tenor and one of the first American composers.

== Publications ==
- The Apollo Harmony (1806)
- Classical Church Music (1812)

The Albany Collection of Sacred Harmony (1800)
