= August Friedrich Ernst Langbein =

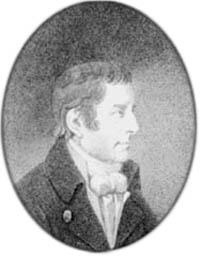
August Friedrich Langbein

August Friedrich Ernst Langbein (6 September 1757 in Radeberg, Saxony – 2 January 1835 in Berlin) was a German humor writer.

== Biography ==
He was born in Radeberg and died in Berlin. He studied law and worked as an actuary for the courts, administrator and chancery clerk. In 1800, he used his private means to devote himself to writing. After 1820, he worked as a censor in the area of belles lettres, with enviable objectivity striking his own works from the catalog.

Extremely proficient in metrical composition, and commanding an inexhaustible fund of drollery, he cultivated with especial success the comical poetic tale, frequently inclining toward frivolity, but teeming with fun. Many of his works have been illustrated by Johann Heinrich Ramberg, a renowned illustrator and painter of the Goethe era. The widespread popularity of Langbein's Schwänke (1792, 21st ed. 1888) was almost equaled by that of his merry tales in prose, such as Thomas Kellerwurm (1806), Magister Zimpels Brautfahrt, and others, distinguished for inventive faculty and pleasing diction.

Although a productive writer, his means were meager until the King granted him a pension. As a person, he was amiable and kind, although somewhat anxious. As a writer, he was reproached for being frivolous and superficial. His writing was inventive and showed talent for humor and verse, but completely lacked the poet's touch. While he was much read with enjoyment by the public of the 1820s, this speaks more against the times than against the writer, who was very conscious of his shortcomings.
