= Giovanni Domenico Perotti =

Italian composer

Giovanni Domenico Perotti (January 20, 1761 – March 24, 1825) was an Italian composer.
