= Jean Hotteterre =

French composer and musician

Jean Hotteterre (1677–1720) was a French composer and musician of the Hotteterre family.

Hotteterre worked at the family workshop on the Rue de Harlay, Paris until his death at the court of Louis XIV. He and his brothers Jacques-Martin and Nicolas made many enhancements to the oboe, creating an "indoor" version similar to the shawm.
