= Antoine-Frédéric Gresnick =

Belgian composer

Antoine-Frédéric Gresnick (c. 1753 – 16 October 1799) was a classical composer. He is chiefly remembered for writing opera buffa, of which he wrote at least twenty-three.

== Early life and education ==
He was born in Liège. He studied music at the Naples Conservatory.

== Career ==
Gresnick lived in London where he composed four operas which were well received. For a time he was the director of music for the Prince of Wales.

By 1780 Gresnick was working in Lyons and, after visiting Berlin and London, he moved in 1794 to Paris where he died in 1799.

== Famous works ==
- Alceste, a 1786 opera
- L'amour de Cythère exilé, a 1793 opera
