= Giacomo Gotifredo Ferrari =

Italian composer (1763–1842)

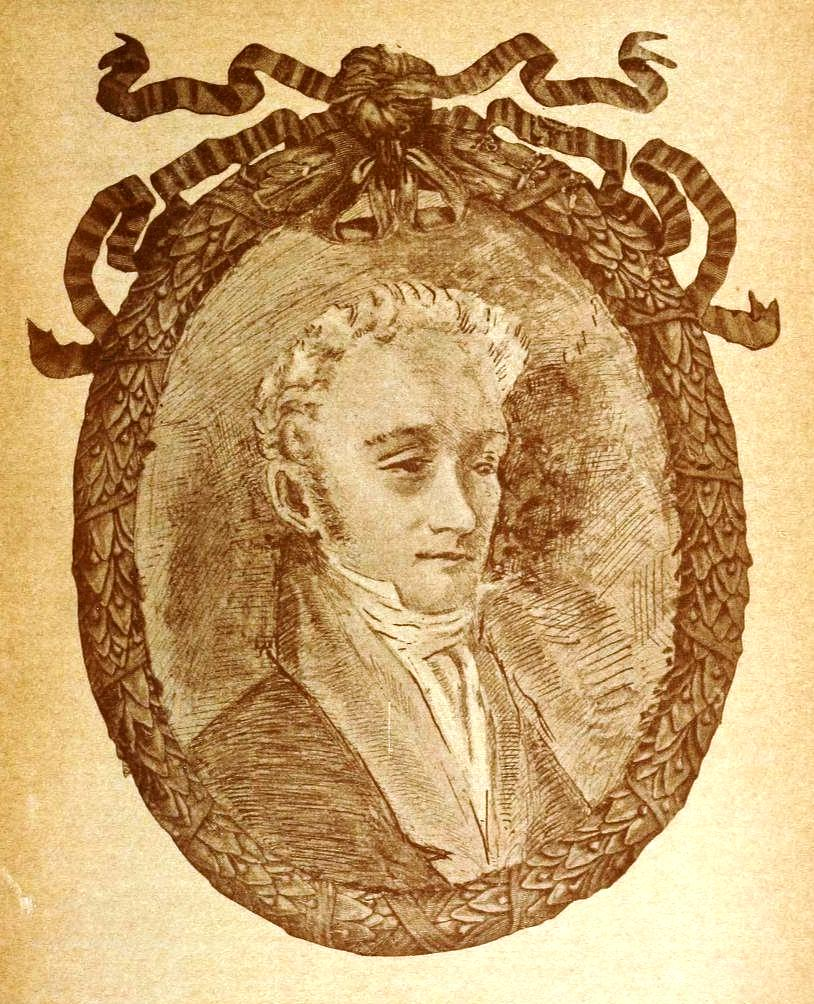
Giacomo Gotifredo Ferrari

Giacomo Gotifredo Ferrari (baptised 2 April 1763 – 2 December 1842) was born in Rovereto in the Italian Alps, and was an Italian composer and singing teacher who spent most of his career in France and England. Four of his operas, I due svizzeri, II Rinaldo d'Asti, L'eroina di Raab, and Lo sbaglio fortunato premiered in the King's Theatre, London. He also composed two ballets, a Mass, and numerous piano sonatas.

== Principal works ==
Operas

- I due Svizzeri (opera buffa in one act, premiered King's Theatre, London, 14 May 1799)
- II Rinaldo d'Asti (opera buffa in two acts, premiered King's Theatre, London, 16 March 1802)
- L'eroina di Raab (opera seria in two acts, premiered King's Theatre, London, 8 April 1813)
- Lo sbaglio fortunato (opera buffa in one act, premiered King's Theatre, London 8 May 1817)

Ballets

- Borea e Zeffiro (premiered King's Theatre, London, 1805)
- La dama di spirito a Napoli (premiered King's Theatre, London, 1809)

Books

- Breve tratto di canto italiano, also published in English translation as Concise Treatise on Italian Singing (1818)
- Studio di musica teorica pratica (1830)
- Anedotti piacevoli e interessanti occorsi nella vita Giacomo Gotifredo Ferrari, da Rovereto (1830).
