= Antonio Maria Mazzoni =

Italian composer (1717–1785)

Antonio Maria Mazzoni (4 January 1717 – 8 December 1785) was an Italian composer.

== Biography ==
Antonio Maria Mazzoni was born in Bologna on 4 January 1717. He was the son of a cook. He was trained as a musician by Luca Antonio Predieri, and produced his first music composition in 1735. In 1736 he was admitted as a student to the Accademia Filarmonica di Bologna where he initially studied to be a tenor before switching to training as a composer.

Mazzoni's first opera, Siroe, re di Persia, was staged in Fano in 1746. In the years following he worked as a musician in a variety of churches in Fano; achieving the title of maestro di cappella in 1748. From 1751 to 1769 he was maestro di cappella of the San Giovanni in Monte in Bologna. He also worked at the Accademia Filarmonica di Bologna from 1757 to 1784; rotating into the position of principe in 1757, 1761, 1771, 1773 and 1784.

He died in Bologna on 8 December 1785.

== Operas ==
- Siroe, re di Persia (opera seria, libretto di Pietro Metastasio, 1746, Fano)
- L'Issipile (opera seria, libretto di Pietro Metastasio, 1747 or 1748, Macerata)
- La Didone abbandonata (opera seria, libretto di Pietro Metastasio, 1752 or 1753, Bologna)
- Il Demofoonte (opera seria, libretto di Pietro Metastasio, 1754, Parma)
- Achille in Sciro (opera seria, libretto di Pietro Metastasio, 1754, Piacenza)
- L'astuzie amorose (opera buffa, 1754, Piacenza)
- La clemenza di Tito (opera seria, libretto di Pietro Metastasio, 1755, Lisbon)
- Antigono (opera seria, libretto di Pietro Metastasio, 1755, Lisbon)
- Ifigenia in Taurride (opera seria, libretto di Marco Coltellini, 1756, Treviso)
- Il viaggiatore ridicolo (opera buffa, libretto di Carlo Goldoni, 1757, Parma)
- Il re pastore (a.k.a.Aminta, opera seria, libretto di Pietro Metastasio, 1757, Bologna)
- Arianna e Teseo (opera seria, libretto di Pietro Pariati, 1758, Teatro San Carlo di Napoli con Giusto Fernando Tenducci)
- L'Eumene (opera seria, libretto di Apostolo Zeno, 1759, Teatro Regio di Torino diretta da Giovanni Battista Somis con Gaetano Guadagni)
- L'astuto ciarlatano (intermezzo, 1760, Bologna)
- Le stravaganze del caso (intermezzo, 1760, Bologna)
- Adriano in Siria (opera seria, libretto di Pietro Metastasio, 1760, Venezia)
- Il mercante fallito (faresetta, libretto di A. Boschi, 1762, Roma)
- Nitteti (opera seria in tre atti, libretto di Pietro Metastasio, 1764, Teatro San Carlo di Napoli con Caterina Gabrielli ed Anton Raaff)
- L'inglese in Italia (dramma giocoso, 1769, Teatro Comunale di Bologna)
