= Balthasar Siberer =

Gymnasium teacher

Balthasar Siberer (1679–1757) was a gymnasium teacher, known for having been an early organ instructor of both Johann Ernst Eberlin and Leopold Mozart. He was from the Holy Roman Empire.

Siberer was born in Schwaz, county of Tyrol, and at some point moved to Augsburg, Bavaria, where he became a teacher at the Jesuit Gymnasium of St. Salvator. He lectured in grammar and philosophy, but is remembered today for his organ lessons.
