= Jacques Widerkehr =

French composer

Jacques Christian Michel Widerkehr l'aîné (also Wiederkehr, Viderkehr; 18 April 1759 – April 1823) was a French composer and cellist from Alsace during the classical era.

== Career ==
Widerkehr was born in Strasbourg, and studied with Franz Xaver Richter, music director of the cathedral, and with a local cellist called Dumonchau. From 1783, he was active as a cellist in Paris, performing with the Concert Spirituel and the orchestra of the Loge Olympique. His main activity, however, appears to have been teaching and composing.

From the 1790s, instrumental works of his composition appeared regularly with French publishers including, besides chamber music,(his oboe sonatas were composed around 1794.) many orchestral works, notably so-called "Symphonies concertantes". These were performed by the most prominent musicians of the time and in the most important Parisian concert halls including the Opéra, the Théâtre Feydeau, and the Concerts de la rue de Cléry.

His musical style is characterized by "a brilliant, even virtuoso and very melodic style of writing" ("eine brillante, sogar virtuose und sehr melodische Schreibweise") and a "pronounced sense for orchestral colours and timbres" ("einen ausgeprägten Sinn für Orchesterfarben und Timbres").

Widerkehr died in Paris. His younger brother Philippe (1793–1816) was a trombonist and member of the National Guard, later also a teacher at the Paris Conservatory.
