= 1763 in music =

== Events ==
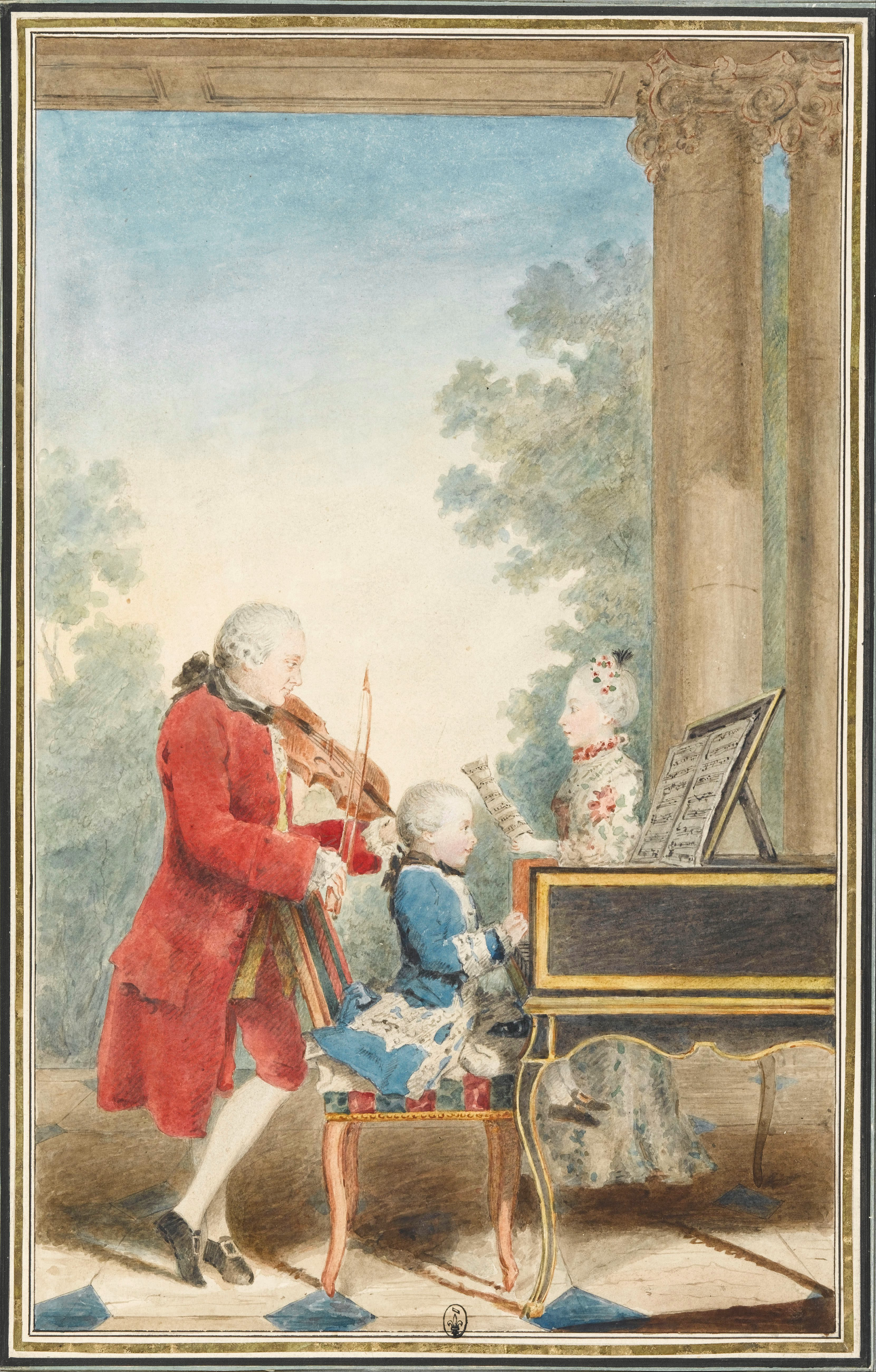
The Mozart family on tour: Leopold, Wolfgang, and Nannerl.

- January 1 – First performance of William Boyce's "At length, th’imperious Lord of War".
- March 24 – Christoph Willibald Gluck leaves Vienna, bound for Bologna where his opera Il trionfo di Clelia is to be premièred.
- April 26 – Gluck is awarded a pension of 600 florins by Empress Maria Theresa.
- May 14 – Nuovo Teatro Pubblico in Bologna opens with the première of Gluck's Il trionfo di Clelia; it is the first major opera house to be constructed with public funds and owned by the municipality.
- May 26 – In Paris, François-Joseph Gossec goes to court to retrieve property from the estate of his late patron Alexandre Le Riche de La Poupelinière.
- July 9 – Mozart family grand tour: The family of Wolfgang Amadeus Mozart sets out on a European tour, ending this year in Paris.
- James Hook becomes musical director of Marylebone Gardens in London.
- St Cecilia's Hall is opened by Edinburgh Musical Society as the first purpose-built concert hall in Scotland, the second in Britain.

== Popular music ==
- none listed

== Opera ==
- Johann Christian Bach - Orione, ossia Diana vendicata (premiered February 19 in London)
- Pietro Guglielmi – Tito Manlio
- Joseph Haydn – Acide
- Niccolò Jommelli – Didone abbandonata (third version)
- Vincenzo Manfredini – Carlo Magno
- Niccolò Piccinni – Le donne vendicate
- Tommaso Traetta – Ifigenia in Tauride
- Johann Adolph Hasse – Siroe, re di Persia

== Classical music ==
- Carl Friedrich Abel – 6 Flute Concertos, WK 46–51
- Johann Georg Albrechtsberger – Applausus musicus (cantata)
- Johann Christian Bach – 6 Keyboard Concertos, Op. 1
- François Joseph Gossec – 6 Symphonies, Op. 6
- Joseph Haydn – Symphonies Nos. 12 and 13
- Michael Haydn – Symphony in G major "Divertimento"; Symphony in B-flat major, Perger 51 "La Confidenza"
- Johann Joachim Quantz – Horn Concerto in E-flat major, QV 5:Anh.14
- Giuseppe Tartini – 6 Violin Sonatas, Op. 9
- Georg Philipp Telemann – Gott, man lobet dich in der Stille (cantata)

== Methods and theory writings ==
- Johann Franz Peter Deysinger – Gründlicher Unterricht die Orgel und das Clavier wohl schlagen zu lernen
- Ignaz Franz Xaver Kürzinger – Getreuer Unterricht zum Singen mit Manieren, und die Violin zu spielen
- Friedrich Wilhelm Marpurg – Anleitung zur Musik überhaupt, und zur Singkunst besonders
- Cristiano Miller – Porta Armonica

== Births ==
- February 20 – Adalbert Gyrowetz, composer (died 1850)
- March 18 – Marie Christine Björn, ballerina
- March 21 – Johann Paul Friedrich Richter, librettist and novelist (died 1825)
- April 2 – Giacomo Gotifredo Ferrari, Italian composer (died 1842)
- April 7 – Domenico Dragonetti, double bass virtuoso and composer (died 1846)
- June 14 – Johann Simon Mayr, composer (died 1845)
- by June 15 – Franz Danzi, German composer (died 1826)
- June 22 – Étienne Méhul, composer (died 1817)
- December 12 – Margareta Alströmer, singer and artist (died 1816)
- Date unknown – Johann Andreas Amon, composer and musician (died 1825)

== Deaths ==
- January 11 – Giovanni Benedetto Platti, Italian composer (born 1697)
- February 7 – Christoph Schaffrath, German composer (born 1709)
- February 12 (buried) – Gottfried Heinrich Bach, keyboardist son of Johann Sebastian Bach (born 1724)
- May 30 – Gustaviana Schröder, Swedish singer (born 1701)
- June 1 – Johann Caspar Vogler, composer
- July 16 – Jacques Hotteterre, French composer (born 1673)
- July 17 – Wenzel Raimund Pirck, composer
- July 22 – John Dalton, librettist and poet (born 1709)
- August 14 – Giovanni Battista Somis, composer
- September 26 – John Byrom, librettist and poet (born 1692)
- December 2 – Carl August Thielo, composer
- unknown date – Johann Gottlieb Janitsch, composer (born 1708)
- probable – Nicola Logroscino, composer (born 1698)
