= August Bernhard Valentin Herbing =

German organist and composer

August Bernhard Valentin Herbing (9 March 1735 in Halberstadt - 26 February 1766 in Magdeburg) was a German organist and composer.

== Life ==
Son of Johann Georg Herbing (1698–1783), who was his first teacher. In 1755 he was assistant organist of the cathedral of Magdeburg. In 1764 he succeeded Georg Tegetmeyer to the position of organist, but he died shortly later.

== Works ==
- Musicalische Belustigungen, a collection of 70 lieder
  - part 1, 1758
  - part 2, 1767
- Musikalischer Versuch, 1759
- March for keyboard inMusikalisches Allerley, 1761
- few other songs in manuscripts

== Sources ==
- Raymond A. Barr's article in New Grove Dictionary of Music
- M. Friedlaender: Das deutsche Lied im 18. Jahrhundert, 1902
- H. Kretzschmar, ed.: Ernst Bach: Sammlung auserlesener Fabeln; Valentin Herbing: Musikalischer Versuch, DDT, xlii, 1910
- W. Hobohm: Das Magdeburger Musikleben im 18. Jahrhundert, 1985
