= Antigono (Mazzoni) =

Antigono is a 1755 setting by Antonio Maria Mazzoni of the libretto by Pietro Metastasio. It was in rehearsal as the third opera for Lisbon's Ópera do Tejo when the Lisbon earthquake struck on 1 November. The opera was not performed until 2011.

== Recording ==
- Antigono Michael Spyres (Antigono), G. McGreevy (Berenice), P. Lucciarini (Demetrio), A. Quintans (Ismene), M. Hinojosa Montenegro (Clearco), M. Oro (Alessandro); Divino Sospiro; Enrico Onofri Recorded ‘live’ in the Grande Auditorium of Centro Cultural de Belem, Lisbon, Portugal, 21–22 June 2011; Dynamic CDS 7686/1-3; 3CD
