= Anselm Bayly =

Rev. Anselm Bayly (1719 – 14 October 1794) was an English churchman and author of various works, chiefly of a theological and critical nature. He was also a singer and musical theorist, associated with the performance of works by George Frideric Handel.

== Biography ==
Bayly was educated at Christ Church, Oxford, where he took the degree of B.C.L. on 12 June 1749, at age 21. He entered the church and rose to some distinction in that profession, becoming minor canon of St Paul's Cathedral and also of Westminster, and sub-dean of the Chapel Royal. On 15 January 1750–51 he was presented by the chapter of St Paul's to the vicarage of Tottenham, Middlesex.

On 10 July 1764, he took the degree of D.C.L. In 1787 he patented an elastic girdle, designed to prevent and relieve ruptures, fractures, and swellings. He died in 1794.

== Works ==
- The Antiquity, Evidence, and Certainty of Christianity, London, 1751.
- An Introduction to Languages Literary and Philosophical, especially to the English, Latin, Greek, and Hebrew, exhibiting at one view their Grammar, Rationale, Analogy, and Idiom, London, 1758.
- A Collection of Anthems used in His Majesty's Chapel Royal, London, 1769.
- A Practical Treatise on Singing and Playing, being an Essay on Grammar, Pronunciation, and Singing. London, 1771.
- A plain and complete Grammar of the English Language, London, 1772.
- A Grammar of the Hebrew Language, London, 1773.
- An edition of the Bible with notes, 1773.
- An edition of the Old Testament with notes, 1774.
- The Commandments of God in Nature, Institution, and Revelation, London, 1778.
- Remarks on Mr. David Levi's Answer to Dr. Priestley's Letters to the Jews, (under the pseudonym of Antisocinus). Against Joseph Priestley.
- The Alliance of Music, Poetry, and Oratory, with a dedication to William Pitt the Elder, London, 1789. This work comprises: (1) a theory of music, (2) a dissertation on prosody, (3) a brief treatise on rhetoric.
