= Mme Papavoine =

French composer

Madame Papavoine née Pellecier (born c. 1735, fl. 1755–61) was a French composer. She married violinist Louis-August Papavoine some time before 1755. Nothing else is known about Madame Papavoine; even her first name is a mystery. After 1761, her name is no longer mentioned.

== Works ==
The Mercure de France published a "Catalogue des oeuvres de M. et Mme Papavoine" in January 1755. This and later issues listed her works as:

- Les arrets d’amour, cantatille as Mlle. Pellecier
- La tourterelle, cantatille as Mlle. Pellecier
- Les charmes de la voix, cantatille as Mlle. Pellecier
- La fête de l’amour, cantatille as Mlle. Pellecier
- Issé, cantatilles as Mlle. Pellecier
- Le joli rien, cantatille as Mlle. Pellecier
- Le triomphe des plaisirs, cantatille, as Mme. Papavoine
- Le Cabriolet, cantatille with two violins, as Mme. Papavoine
- Nous voici donc au jour l’an, 12-bar unaccompanied air gaiment
- Vous fuyez sans vouloir m’entendre, chanson (1756)
- Reviens, aimable Thémire, ‘pastoralle’ (1761)
- La France sauvée ou Le triomphe de la vertù, cantatille
