= 1766 in music =

== Events ==
- after March – Joseph Haydn becomes Kapellmeister to the house of Esterházy, following the death of Gregor Werner, and their orchestra is increased to 22 players.
- October 8 – Inauguration of the Teatro Onigo with the world premiere of Pietro Alessandro Guglielmi's opera Demofonte.
- November 29 – Wolfgang Amadeus Mozart returns to Salzburg after the Mozart family grand tour of Europe.
- unknown dates
  - Niccolò Piccinni is invited to Paris by Queen Marie Antoinette.
  - The new Drottningholm Palace Theatre in Stockholm is completed as an opera house.

== Opera ==
- Egidio Romualdo Duni – La clochette
- Florian Leopold Gassmann
  - L'amore artigiano
  - Il viaggiatore ridicolo
- Joseph Haydn – La Canterina (libretto by an unknown, based on material by Carlo Goldoni)
- Johann Adam Hiller – Der lustige Schuster
- Niccolò Jommelli – Il Vologeso
- Pierre-Alexandre Monsigny – Aline, reine de Golconde
- Giovanni Paisiello – Le finte contesse, R.1.7
- Niccolò Piccinni – La molinarella

== Classical music ==
- Carl Philipp Emmanuel Bach – Pieces (40) for Keyboard, Wq 117: no. 2, Solfeggio in C minor, H 220
- Claude-Bénigne Balbastre – Romance in C major
- Capel Bond – Six Concertos in Seven Parts (London) (for trumpet)
- Carl Ditters von Dittersdorf – Symphony in A major "nel gusto di cinque nazioni", Kr.18
- Joseph Haydn
  - Divertimento in C major, Hob.XVI:7
  - Divertimento in G major, Hob.XVI:8
  - Keyboard Concerto in F major, Hob.XVIII:6
  - Great Mass in E-flat
- Michael Haydn – Symphony in B-flat major
- Niccolò Jommelli – Missa Solemne
- Wolfgang Amadeus Mozart
  - 8 Variations on "Laat ons juichen", K.24
  - 7 Variations on "Willem von Nassau", K.25
  - Violin Sonata in G major, K.27
  - Violin Sonata in C major, K.28
  - Violin Sonata in B-flat major, K.31
  - Die Schuldigkeit des ersten Gebotes, K.35
- Johann Adolf Scheibe – Sørgekantate

== Publications ==
- Charles Avison – Twelve Concertos (Divided into Two Sets) for Two Violins, One Alto Viola, and a Violoncello. This Work Is Also Adapted to the Practice of the Organ or Harpsichord Alone. Or These to Serve as an Accompanyment to the Parts in Concert, Which May Be Reinforced at Pleasure, Op. 9 (London)
- Johann Christian Bach – Six Sonatas, for piano or harpsichord, Op. 5 (London)
- Franz Ignaz Beck – 6 Sinfonies, Op. 4 (Paris)
- Capel Bond – Six Concertos in Seven Parts (London)
- Dom Bédos de Celles – L'art du facteur d'orgues, volume 1 (the fourth and final volume is not published until 1778).

== Methods and theory writings ==
- François Lamathe Bédos de Celles de Salelles – L'art du facteur d'orgues [first of four volumes] (Paris: Author)
- William Tans'ur – The Elements of Musick Display'd

== Births ==
- February 24 – Samuel Wesley, organist and composer (died 1837)
- March 28 – Joseph Weigl, composer and conductor (died 1846)
- July 19 – Johann Anton Friedrich Fleischmann, composer (died 1798)
- July 21 – Carolina, Baroness Nairne, Scottish songwriter (died 1845)
- July 22 – Franz Xaver Süssmayr, Austrian composer (died 1803)
- August 1 – Ignace Antoine Ladurner, pianist and composer (died 1839)
- August 22 – Joseph-Denis Doche, composer (died 1825)
- October 9 – Bedřich Diviš Weber, composer and founding principal of the Prague Conservatory (died 1842)
- November 16 – Rodolphe Kreutzer, violinist and composer (died 1831)
- November 20 – John Wall Callcott, composer (died 1821)

== Deaths ==
- January 30 – Susannah Maria Arne, singer (born 1714)
- February 26 – August Bernhard Valentin Herbing, composer (born 1735)
- March 3 – Gregor Werner, composer and leader of Prince Paul Esterházy's orchestra (born 1693)
- March 20 – Giovanni Battista Pescetti, organist and composer (born c. 1704)
- March 25 – Johannes Ritschel, composer (born 1739)
- April – François Étienne Blanchet II, harpsichord maker (born 1730)
- June 23 – Thomas Roseingrave, composer and organist (born 1690 or 1691)
- October 7 – André Chéron, composer (born 1695)
- November 9 – Unico Wilhelm van Wassenaer, composer (born 1692)
- December (or later) – Carlo Tessarini, violinist and composer (born c. 1690)
- date unknown – Alvise Giusti, librettist (born 1709)
