= 1762 in music =

== Events ==
- 6-year-old Mozart and his older sister Nannerl perform before Maximilian III Joseph, Elector of Bavaria, in Munich and the Empress Maria Theresa of Austria in Vienna.
- Johann Christian Bach begins composing for the King's Theatre in London; here he meets Carl Friedrich Abel for the first time. He will spend the remaining 20 years of his life in the city.
- Michael Haydn moves to Salzburg to become Konzertmeister to the Archbishop.
- Death of Le Riche de La Pouplinière, patron of Jean-Philippe Rameau, Johann Stamitz and François-Joseph Gossec.
- The first public concert with a glass harmonica is performed by Marianne Davies.

== Classical music ==
- Carl Friedrich Abel – Six Overtures in 8 Parts, Op. 4 (London)
- Johann Albrechtsberger – Passione Domini
- Carl Philipp Emanuel Bach
  - L'Aly Rupalich, H.95
  - Harpsichord Concerto in C minor, H.448
  - Sonatina in D major, H.449
  - Solo für die Harfe H.563 Wq.139
- Wilhelm Friedemann Bach – Trio in B-flat major, F.50
- Franz Ignaz Beck – 6 Symphonies, Op. 3
- Michel Corrette – 6 Symphonies en Quatuor sur les Noëls
- Francesco Geminiani – The Second Collection of Pieces for the Harpsichord (London, arrangements by the composer from Opp.1, 2, 4, 5, 7, and treatises on the violin and the guitar)
- Joseph Haydn
  - Horn Concerto No.1 in D major, Hob.VIId:3
  - Baryton Trio in G major, Hob.XI:116
  - Symphony No. 9 in C major, Hob.I:9
- Louis Antoine Lefebvre – Andromède (secular cantata)
- Leopold Mozart – Sacrament Litany in D
- Wolfgang Amadeus Mozart
  - Minuet in F for Piano, K. 2
  - Allegro in B♭ for Piano, K. 3
  - Minuet in F for Piano, K. 4
  - Minuet in F for Piano, K. 5
- Georg Philipp Telemann – Christmas Oratorio

== Opera ==
- Thomas Arne – Artaxerxes
- Johann Christian Bach – Alessandro nell'Indie, W.G 3
- Domenico Cimarosa – La Cleopatra
- Baldassare Galuppi – Antigono
- Christoph Willibald Gluck – Orfeo ed Euridice
- Johann Adolf Hasse – Il Trionfo di Clelia
- Pierre-Alexandre Monsigny – Le Roi et le Fermier
- Johann Gottlieb Naumann – Il tesoro insidiato
- Niccolò Piccinni – Il Finto Turco
- Giuseppe Sarti – Didone Abbandonata

== Methods and theory writings ==
- Carl Philipp Emanuel Bach – Versuch über die wahre Art das Clavier zu spielen, Part II
- François Clément – Essai sur la basse fondamentale
- William Riley – Parochial Music Corrected
- Antonio Soler – Llave de la modulación, y antigüedades de la musica (Madrid: Joachin Ibarra)

== Births ==
- January 20 – Jérôme-Joseph de Momigny, composer (died 1842)
- January 21 – Giuseppe Antonio Silvani, composer
- February 2 – Girolamo Crescentini, composer and castrato (died 1846)
- February 19 – Friedrich Franz Hurka, composer
- March 13 – Anine Frölich, ballet dancer (d. 1784)
- March 24 – Marcos Antonio da Fonseca, Portugal, opera composer
- March 25 – Francesco Giuseppi Pollini, composer
- April 4 – Stephen Storace, composer (died 1796)
- April 13 – Karl Friedrich Horn, composer
- April 26 – Shyama Shastri, composer (died 1827)
- June 24 – Johann Paul Wessely, composer
- July 4 – Marco Santucci, composer
- July 20 – Jakob Haibel, composer
- August 10 – Santiago Ferrer, composer
- October 15 – Samuel Adams Holyoke, composer (died 1820)
- December 25 – Michael Kelly, editor and tenor (died 1826)
- December 26 – Franz Wilhelm Tausch, composer
- unknown date
  - Giovanna Bassi, ballet dancer
  - Michel Dieulafoy, French librettist (died 1823)
  - Christina Fredenheim, singer and member of the Swedish Royal Academy of Music (died 1841)

== Deaths ==
- January 13 – Leonhard Trautsch, composer
- February 11 – Johann Tobias Krebs, composer (born 1690)
- February 12 – Laurent Belissen, composer (born 1693)
- c. March 25 – Johann Christian Schickhardt, German composer (born c. 1682)
- April 2 – Vincenzo Legrenzio Ciampi, Italian composer (born 1719)
- April 23 – Johann Samuel Endler, composer (born 1694)
- May 16 – Ernst Christian Hesse, composer (born 1676)
- May 24 – Joseph Umstatt, composer (born 1711)
- June 19 – Johann Ernst Eberlin, composer (born 1702)
- July 5 – Jakob Adlung, organist, instrument maker, music theorist and historian (born 1699)
- July 16 – Jacques-Martin Hotteterre, composer (born 1674)
- July 20 – Christoph Nichelmann, harpsichordist and composer (born 1717)
- July 30 – Johann Valentin Görner, German composer (born 1702)
- September 17 – Francesco Geminiani, violinist and composer (born 1687)
- October 6 – Francesco Manfredini, composer (born 1684)
- November 25 – Jacques-Christophe Naudot, flautist and composer (born c.1690)
