= Antoine Mahaut =

Flemish flautist, composer, and editor

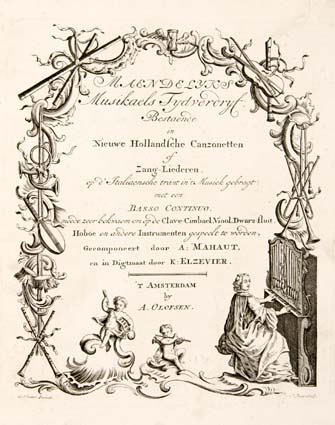
Maendelyks musikaels tydverdryf; Bestaende in nieuwe Hollandsche canzonetten of zang-liederen, composed by Antoine Mahaut (1751–52)

Antoine Mahaut (1719 – c. 1785) was a Flemish flautist, composer, and editor.

== Biography ==
Antoine Mahaut was baptized in Namur on May 4, 1719. He studied music with his father who was also a flautist. He entered the service of Bishop of Strickland at the age of fifteen; arriving in London in 1734. The composer returned to Namur in 1737, where he served the wife of Walter de Colijaer for two years.

In 1739 Mahaut relocated to Amsterdam where he was a frequent performer. He also toured Germany that same year, and later spent time doing work on visits to Dresden, Augsburg, Namur, and Paris when not in Amsterdam. He was also active as a music teacher in Amsterdam, and there published one of his first treatises on flute performance in the Dutch language. He obtained a permit to publish his own compositions in Amsterdam on 20 July 1751. By 1760 he had left Amsterdam and was living in Paris. He lived there until fleeing his French creditors to reside in French monastery.

Mahaut influenced Joseph Haydn and Mozart. He was important as a symphonist in France and composed flute duets and trios and Dutch songs as well. He flourished in France, composing in a classical style and he died there in 1785 at the age of 65.

Mahaut's work enjoyed a lot of publications during the composers life. Aside of musical works, he also wrote a flute method titled Nouvelle méthode pour apprendre en peu de temps a jouer la flute traversière:Nieuwe manier om binnen korten tijd op de dwarsfluit te leeren spelen. A monthly magazine titled Maandelijks musikael tijdverdrijf was also published by him. It featured his aria's and songs, which were written in an Italian style.
