= Johann Ernst Eberlin =

German composer and organist (1702–1762)

- Born: 27 March 1702
- Died: 19 June 1762 (aged 60)

Johann Ernst Eberlin (27 March 1702 – 19 June 1762) was a German composer and organist whose works bridge the baroque and classical eras. He was a composer of church organ and choral music. Marpurg claims he wrote as much and as rapidly as Alessandro Scarlatti and Georg Philipp Telemann, a claim also repeated by Leopold Mozart - though Eberlin did not live nearly as long as either of those two composers.

== Biography ==
Eberlin's first musical training began in 1712 at the Jesuit Gymnasium of St. Salvator in Augsburg. His teachers there were Georg Egger and Balthasar Siberer, who taught him how to play the organ. He began his university education in 1721 at the Benedictine University in Salzburg where he studied law, but from 1723 turned to music.

His first breakthrough was in 1727 when he became the organist for Count Leopold von Firmian (then Archbishop of Salzburg). He reached the peak of his career when he was the organist for Archbishop Andreas Jakob von Dietrichstein. By 1749 he held the posts of Hof- und Domkapellmeister (Court and Cathedral chapel master) simultaneously, an achievement which his successors Michael Haydn, Leopold Mozart, and Mozart himself were not to match. Despite Leopold Mozart's great opinion of Eberlin, and having sent his son some of Eberlin's best-known works, his keyboard pieces, the young Mozart later tired of them, writing in a letter of 20 April 1782 that Eberlin's works were "far too trivial to deserve a place beside Handel and Bach."

Eberlin composed industriously and played at church concerts. After his death, though, his strict choral pieces in the stile antico faded from popularity and only his keyboard works were (to a limited extent) remembered.

His contemporaries included Anton Cajetan Adlgasser.

== Works, editions, recordings ==
Eberlin composed toccatas and fugues, masses including the Missa secundi toni, cantatas, a Requiem, psalm settings and operas. He composed oratorios in German on librettos by Metastasio:

- Giuseppe riconosciuto (1750s)
- La passione di Gesù Cristo (The Passion of Jesus Christ, Salzburg 1755)
- Sant’Elena al Calvario (St. Helena on the Calvary, Salzburg, probably between 1753 and 1763).

Editions

- Johann Ernst Eberlin: Te Deum, Dixit Dominus, and Magnificat Reinhard G Pauly. 1971

Recordings

- Sacred Choral Music - Rodolfus Choir, conducted by Ralph Allwood. ASV 2000.
- The 9 Toccatas & Fugues - David Titterington. ASV 1998.
- Salzburger Kirchenmusik - La Banda, Camerata Vocale Günzburg, conducted by Jurgen Rettenmaier. Carus
