= Kungliga Hovkapellet =

Swedish royal chapel orchestra

Logo of the Kungliga Hovkapellet

Kungliga Hovkapellet (Swedish: [ˈkɵ̂ŋːlɪɡa ˈhôːvkaˌpɛlːɛt], "The Royal Court Orchestra") is a Swedish orchestra, originally part of the Royal court in Sweden's capital Stockholm. Its existence was first recorded in 1526. Since 1773 it is part of the Royal Swedish Opera's company.

== History ==
Kungliga Hovkapellet is one of the oldest active orchestras in the world. It was first recorded in the royal account books from 1526. The orchestra originally consisted of both musicians and singers. It had only male members until 1727, when Sophia Schröder and Judith Fischer were employed as vocalists; in the 1850s, the harpist Marie Pauline Åhman became the first female instrumentalist.

The orchestra had a golden age under the leadership of several members of the Düben family during the 17th century. In the 18th century, its directors included Johan Helmich Roman and Francesco Uttini. From 1731, public concerts were performed at Riddarhuset in Stockholm.

Since 1773, when the Royal Swedish Opera was founded by Gustav III of Sweden, the Kungliga Hovkapellet has been part of the opera's company.

== See also ==
- Hovsångare
