= Jacques-Martin Hotteterre =

French composer and flautist (1674–1763)

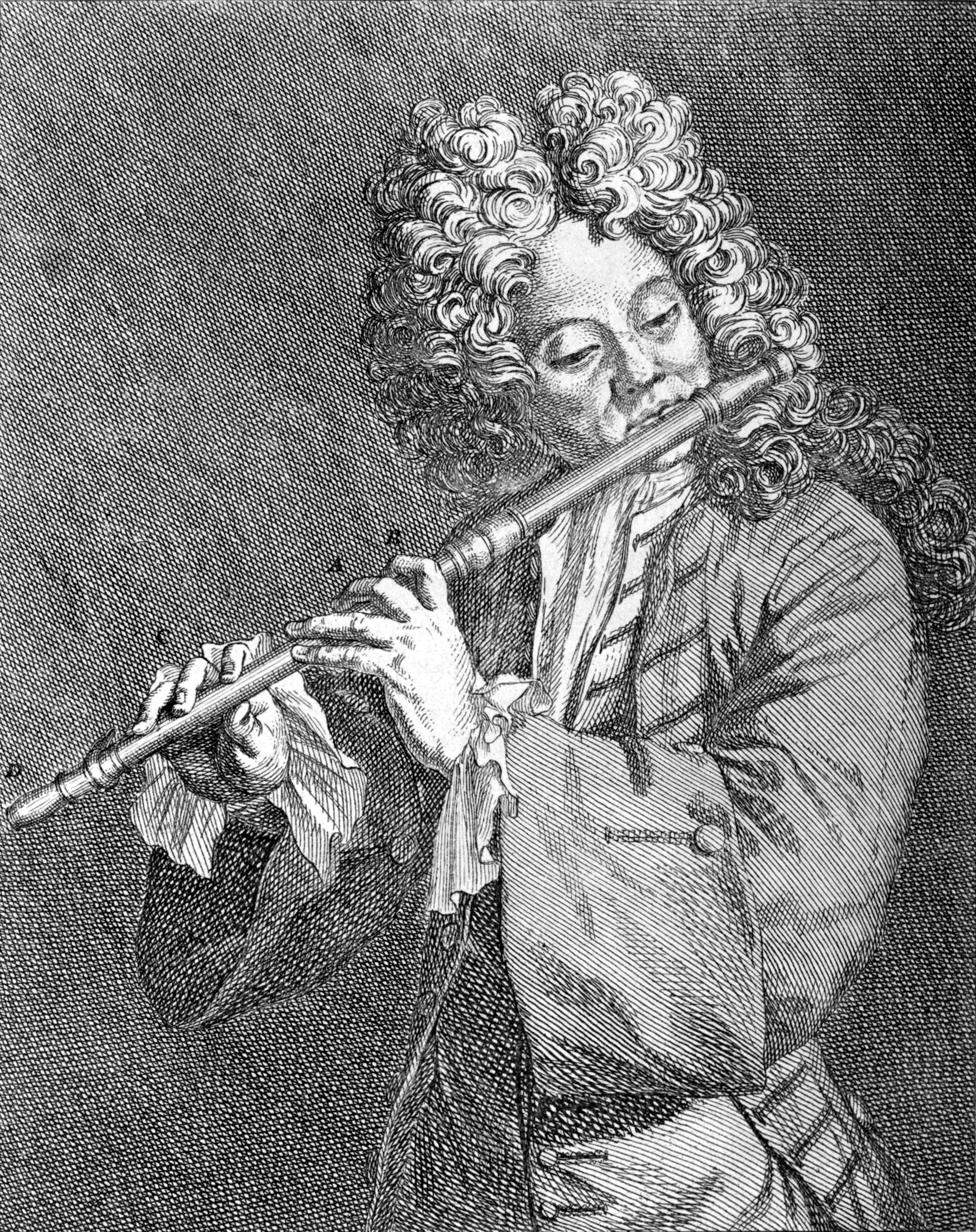
Jacques-Martin Hotteterre

Jacques-Martin Hotteterre (29 September 1674 – 16 July 1763), also known as Jacques Martin or Jacques Hotteterre, was a French composer and flautist, instrument maker and teacher, who was the most celebrated of a family of wind instrument makers and wind performers.

== Biography ==
Hotteterre was born in Paris, France, the son of Martin Hotteterre (d. 1712) and Marie Crespy. In about 1704, Jacques-Martin Hotteterre succeeded his cousin Jacques in the post of basse de hautbois et taille de violon at the royal court.

Hotteterre lived and studied in Rome early in his career, and his nickname le Romain (the Roman) came from this period. He spent two years (1698–1700) employed by Prince Francesco Ruspoli in Rome, before adopting the nickname of "Le Romain" at some point between 1705 and 1707. By 1708, he became a musician to the King of France, in the king's Grande Écurie, and in 1717, he inherited René Pignon Descoteaux's post as Jouëur de Fluste de la musique de chambre.

Jacques-Martin Hotteterre was the most prominent member of the Hotteterre family, a dynasty of woodwind players and instrument makers. His father, Martin Hotteterre, trained him in performance and instrument making, and his eldest son, Jean-Baptiste Hotteterre, continued the family tradition as a woodwind player and maker. Hotteterre's daughter, Marie-Geneviève, married the organist Claude-Bénigne Balbastre, reflecting the family's high social standing.

Hotteterre owed his fame largely to his talent for playing the flute, an instrument for which he wrote a number of pieces, significantly extending the repertory for the instrument. In addition, he played the bassoon, oboe, and musette. Hotteterre was also an internationally celebrated teacher to aristocratic patrons. He wrote one method for the transverse flute, recorder, and oboe, published in 1707, as well as a method for the musette, published in 1737. His L'Art de préluder sur la flûte traversière was published in 1719. It was Europe's first flute manual and was used widely.

The music of the modern flute begins with this author, the most celebrated flutist of the end of the seventeenth and the beginning of the eighteenth centuries. Hotteterre was Chamber Musician to the King of France, and was the first one to play a transverse flute in the orchestra of the Paris Grand Opera. This extremely rare work is the earliest known book of instructions, in any language, for the transverse flute. —Dayton C. Miller (1866–1941)

Several transverse flutes marked HOTTETERRE with the device of an anchor, discovered within the last hundred years or more, have provided actual specimens of the alleged result of the Hotteterres' efforts. Specialists in woodwind history are generally aware of three "Hotteterre" flutes—in Berlin, St. Petersburg and Graz—all of which closely resemble the one in Picart's engraving. However it has recently been shown that two of these are nineteenth-century replicas of a specimen now lost, and only the Graz example is in fact the work of Jacques Hotteterre or his father, Martin.

In addition to his work as a performer and teacher, Jacques-Martin Hotteterre continued his family's tradition of woodwind instrument making. He was closely associated with the Hotteterre family workshop on the rue de Harlay, which was renowned for producing high-quality flutes and other woodwinds. While direct evidence of his personal craftsmanship is limited, Grove Music Online suggests that he may have contributed to innovations in the design of the transverse flute. Notably, the flute, which had previously been constructed as a single cylindrical piece, came to be made in three separate sections: the head (with the mouthpiece), the body (containing most of the finger holes), and the foot (with a keyed hole for low E♭). This modular design improved tuning, playability, and portability, and became a standard form for the instrument in the early eighteenth century.

Numerous other members of the Hotteterre family were reputed to have been fine woodwind players; some also had a decisive impact on woodwind instrument construction. Jacques's grandfather Jean (c. 1605 to 1690–1692) was noted for his playing and innovative building. He may have been influential in certain developments in woodwind instruments, and he is credited with creating the oboe. Jean and his son Martin (c. 1640–1712), father of Jacques-Martin, were responsible for important advances in musette making. A number of recorders by the Hotteterre family also survive, none of which are believed to be by Jacques-Martin.

Jacques-Martin Hotteterre died in Paris in 1763.

== Compositions ==
Suite in D

- Op. 1 Principes de la flûte traversière, ou flûte d'Allemangne, de la flûte à bec ou flûte douce et du hautbois, divisez par traictez (1707)
- Op. 2 Premier livre de pièces pour la flûte traversière et autres instruments avec la basse (1708)
- Op. 3 Sonates en trio pour les flûtes traversières et a bec, violon, hautbois (1712)
- Op. 4 Première suitte de pièces suite de pièces à deux dessus, sans basse continue. Pour les flûtes-traversières, flûtes à bec, violes, (1712)
- Op. 5 Deuxième livre de pièces pour la flûte traversière et autres instruments avec la basse (1715)
- Op. 6 Deuxième suite de pièces à deux dessus pour les flûtes-traversières, flûtes à bec, violes, etc... avec une basse adjoutée et sans altération des dessus, laquelle on y pourra joindre pour le concert (1717)
- Op. 7 L'art de Préluder (1719)
- Op. 8 Troisième suite de pièces à deux dessus (1722)
- Op. 9 Concert de Rossignol (lost)
- Op. 10 Méthode pour la Musette contenant des principes, par un recueil d'airs et quelques préludes (1738)
- Airs et brunettes à deux et trois dessus avec la basse – Tirez des meilleurs autheurs (1721)
- Arrangements of pieces by Valentine and Torelli for two flutes
- Arrangement of trios by Albinoni (lost)

== Bibliography ==
- Giannini, Tula. 1993a. "Jacques Hotteterre le Romain and his Father Martin: A Re-examination Based on Recently Found Documents". Early Music XXI, no. 3 (August): 377–395. doi:10.1093/em/XXI.3.377 [Includes genealogical chart, illustrations, transcriptions and translations of documents.]
- Giannini, Tula. 1993b. Great Flute Makers of France, the Lot and Godfroy Families (1650–1900). London: Tony Bingham. ISBN 0-946113-05-X
- Sardelli, Federico Maria. 2007. Vivaldi's Music for Flute and Recorder, translated by Michael Talbot. Aldershot, England; Burlington, Vermont: Ashgate, in association with the Istituto Italiano Antonio Vivaldi/Fondazione "Giorgio Cini". ISBN 0-7546-3714-X
