= List of Classical-era composers =

This is a list of composers of the Classical music era, roughly from 1730 to 1820. Prominent classicist composers include Christoph Willibald Gluck, Carl Philipp Emanuel Bach, André Grétry, Joseph Haydn, Muzio Clementi, Wolfgang Amadeus Mozart, Luigi Boccherini, Johann Nepomuk Hummel, Luigi Cherubini, Ludwig van Beethoven, Gioachino Rossini, and Franz Schubert.

As with the list of Romantic composers, this is a purely chronological catalogue and includes figures not usually thought of as Classical-period composers, such as Johann Sebastian Bach and George Frideric Handel, as well as figures more often regarded as belonging to the early Romantic era, such as Carl Maria von Weber and Gaetano Donizetti.

== Early Galante era composers – Transition from Baroque to Classical (born before 1710) ==
Composers in the Baroque/Classical transitional era, sometimes seen as the beginning of the Galante era, include the following listed by their date of birth:

- Giacomo Antonio Perti (1661–1756)
- Nicolas Siret (1663–1754)
- Michele Mascitti (1664–1760)
- Johann Christoph Pepusch (1667–1752)
- Johann Nicolaus Bach (1669–1753)
- Giuseppe Avitrano (1670–1756)
- Louis de Caix d'Hervelois (1670–1760)
- Richard Leveridge (1670–1758)
- Tomaso Giovanni Albinoni (1671–1751)
- Azzolino della Ciaja or della Ciaia or della Araja (1671–1755)
- Georg Caspar Schürmann (1672/1673–1751)
- Pierre Dumage (1674–1751)
- Jacques-Martin Hotteterre (1674–1763)
- Giovanni Porta (1675–1755)
- Giacomo Facco (1676–1753)
- Wolff Jakob Lauffensteiner (1676–1754)
- Giuseppe Maria Orlandini (1676–1760)
- Giovanni Carlo Maria Clari (1677–1754)
- Ferdinando Antonio Lazzari (1678–1754)
- Giovanni Antonio Piani or Jean-Antoine Desplanes (1678–1760)
- Manuel de Zumaya (1678–1755)
- Jean-Baptiste Stuck (1680–1755)
- Johann Mattheson (1681–1764)
- Georg Philipp Telemann (1681–1767)
- Giuseppe Valentini (1681–1753)
- Paolo Benedetto Bellinzani (1682–1757)
- Giacobbe Cervetto (1682–1783)
- Pietro Baldassare (1683 – after 1768)
- Christoph Graupner (1683–1760)
- Jean-Philippe Rameau (1683–1764)
- François d'Agincourt (1684–1758)
- François Bouvard (1684–1760)
- Francesco Durante (1684–1755)
- Francesco Manfredini (1684–1762)
- Johann Theodor Roemhildt (1684–1756)
- Giuseppe Matteo Alberti (1685–1751)
- Louis-Antoine Dornel (1685–1765)
- George Frideric Handel (1685–1759)
- Wilhelm Hieronymus Pachelbel (1685–1764)
- Domenico Scarlatti (1685–1757)
- Johann Sebastian Bach (1685-1750)
- Nicola Porpora (1686–1768)
- Giovanni Battista Somis (1686–1763)
- Willem de Fesch (1687–1761)
- Francesco Geminiani (1687–1762)
- Johann Georg Pisendel (1687–1755)
- Johann Friedrich Fasch (1688–1758)
- Thomas Roseingrave (1688–1766)
- Jacques Aubert (1689–1753)
- Joseph Bodin de Boismortier (1689–1755)
- Pietro Gnocchi (1689–1775)
- Francesco Barsanti (1690–1775)
- Giuseppe Antonio Brescianello (1690–1758)
- Pierre-Gabriel Buffardin (1690–1768)
- Fortunato Chelleri (1690–1757)
- François Colin de Blamont (1690–1760)
- Giovanni Antonio Giai or Giay, Giaj (1690–1764)
- Johann Tobias Krebs (1690–1762)
- Gottlieb Muffat (1690–1770)
- Jacques-Christophe Naudot (1690–1762)
- Manuel José de Quirós (1690?–1765)
- Francesco Maria Veracini (1690–1768)
- Giovanni Giorgi (1690–1762)
- Francesco Feo (1691–1761)
- Jan Francisci (1691–1758)
- Conrad Friedrich Hurlebusch (1691–1765)
- Antonio Palella (1692–1761)
- Giovanni Alberto Ristori (1692–1753)
- Giuseppe Tartini (1692–1770)
- Unico Wilhelm van Wassenaer (1692–1766)
- Laurent Belissen (1693–1762)
- Gregor Joseph Werner (1693–1766)
- Louis-Claude Daquin (1694–1772)
- Johann Samuel Endler (1694–1762)
- Pierre-Claude Foucquet (1694–1772)
- Johan Helmich Roman (1694–1758)
- Johann Lorenz Bach (1695–1773)
- Pietro Locatelli (1695–1764)
- Marie-Anne-Catherine Quinault (1695–1791)
- Ernst Gottlieb Baron (1696–1760)
- Pierre Février (1696–1760)
- Maurice Greene (1696–1755)
- Johann Melchior Molter (1696–1765)
- Johann Caspar Vogler (1696–1763)
- Andrea Zani (1696–1757)
- Josse Boutmy (1697–1779)
- Cornelius Heinrich Dretzel (1697–1775)
- Adam Falckenhagen (1697–1754)
- Johann Christian Hertel (1697/1699–1754)
- Jean-Marie Leclair l'aîné (1697–1764)
- Giuseppe de Majo (1697–1771)
- Giovanni Benedetto Platti (1697–1763)
- Johann Pfeiffer (1697–1761)
- Johann Joachim Quantz (1697–1773)
- Francesco Antonio Vallotti (1697–1780)
- Pietro Auletta (1698–1771)
- Riccardo Broschi (1698–1756)
- François Francoeur (1698–1787)
- František Jiránek (1698–1778)
- Nicola Bonifacio Logroscino (1698–1764)
- Gaetano Maria Schiassi (1698–1754)
- Jean-Baptiste Forqueray le fils (1699–1782)
- Joseph Gibbs (1699–1788)
- Johann Adolf Hasse (1699–1783)
- Juan Francés de Iribarren (1699–1767)
- Jan Zach (1699–1773)
- Charles Dollé (fl. 1735–1755; d. after 1755)
- Mlle Guédon de Presles (c. 1700–1754)
- Louis Antoine Lefebvre (1700–1763)
- Michel Blavet (1700–1768)
- Sebastian Bodinus (1700–1759)
- Domenico Dall'Oglio (1700–1764)
- João Rodrigues Esteves (1700–1751)
- Nicola Fiorenza (after 1700–1764)
- Jean-Baptiste Masse (c. 1700 – c. 1756)
- Giovanni Battista Sammartini (1700–1775)
- Johan Agrell (1701–1765)
- François Rebel (1701–1775)
- Alessandro Besozzi (1702–1775)
- Johann Ernst Eberlin (1702–1762)
- José de Nebra (1702–1768)
- Francisco António de Almeida (1702–1755)
- John Frederick Lampe (1703–1751)
- Johann Gottlieb Graun (c. 1703–1771)
- Jean-Marie Leclair le cadet (the younger) (1703–1777)
- Carlo Zuccari (1703–1792)
- Carl Heinrich Graun (1704–1759)
- Giovanni Battista Pescetti (c. 1704 – c. 1766)
- František Tůma (1704–1774)
- Nicolas Chédeville (1705–1782)
- Henri-Jacques de Croes (1705–1786)
- Michael Christian Festing (1705–1752)
- Louis-Gabriel Guillemain (1705–1770)
- Johann Peter Kellner (1705–1772)
- Pancrace Royer (1705–1755)
- Andrea Bernasconi (c. 1706–1784)
- Carlo Cecere (1706–1761)
- Baldassare Galuppi (1706–1785)
- William Hayes (1706–1777)
- Giovanni Battista Martini or Padre Martini (1706–1784)
- Thomas Chilcot (1707–1766)
- Michel Corrette (1707–1795)
- Ignacio de Jerusalem (1707–1769)
- Johann Baptist Georg Neruda (c. 1707 – c. 1780)
- Domenico Paradies or Pietro Domenico Paradisi (1707–1791)
- António Teixeira (1707–1769)
- Bernard-Aimable Dupuy (1707–1789)
- Jacques-Philippe Lamoninary (1707–1802)
- Felix Benda (1708–1768)
- Egidio Duni (1708–1775)
- Johann Gottlieb Janitsch (1708–1763)
- Václav Jan Kopřiva known as Urtica (1708–1789)
- Georg Reutter (the younger) (1708–1772)
- Johann Adolph Scheibe (1708–1776)
- Francesco Araja (1709 – after 1762)
- Franz Benda (1709–1786)
- Jean-Noël Hamal (1709–1778)
- Franz Xaver Richter (1709–1789)
- Christoph Schaffrath (1709–1763)
- Princess Wilhelmine of Prussia (1709–1758)
- Charles Avison (1709–1770)

== Early Classical era/Later Galante era composers (born 1710–1730) ==
- Giovanni Battista Pergolesi (1710–1736)
- Domenico Alberti (1710–1740)
- Joseph Abaco, or dall'Abaco (1710–1805)
- Thomas Arne (1710–1778)
- Wilhelm Friedemann Bach (1710–1784)
- Carlo Graziani (c. 1710–1787)
- Giuseppe Bonno (1711–1788)
- William Boyce (1711–1779)
- Gaetano Latilla (1711–1788)
- Ignaz Holzbauer (1711–1783)
- Davide Perez (1711–1778)
- Barbara of Portugal (1711–1758)
- Jean-Joseph Cassanéa de Mondonville (1711–1772)
- Domènec Terradellas (c. 1711–1751)
- James Oswald (1711–1769)
- Frederick the Great (1712–1786)
- John Hebden (1712–1765)
- Jean-Jacques Rousseau (1712–1778)
- John Christopher Smith (1712–1795)
- John Stanley (1712–1786)
- Antoine Dauvergne (1713–1797)
- Johan Henrik Freithoff (1713–1767)
- Jean-Baptiste Canavas l'aîné, or Giovanni Battista Canavasso (1713–1784)
- Luise Adelgunda Gottsched (1713–1762)
- Johann Ludwig Krebs (1713–1780)
- Carl Philipp Emanuel Bach (1714–1788)
- Johan Daniel Berlin (1714–1787)
- Per Brant (1714–1767) (sv:Per Brant)
- Joseph Canavas, or Giuseppe Canavasso (1714–1776) ()
- Christoph Willibald Gluck (1714–1787)
- Gottfried August Homilius (1714–1785)
- Niccolò Jommelli (1714–1774)
- Girolamo Abos (1715–1760)
- Pasquale Cafaro (1715/1716–1787)
- Johann Friedrich Doles (1715–1797)
- John Alcock (1715–1806)
- Jacques Duphly (1715–1789)
- Charles-Joseph van Helmont (1715–1790)
- James Nares (1715–1783)
- Antoine Dard (1715–1784)
- Georg Christoph Wagenseil (1715–1777)
- Josef Seger (1716–1782)
- Princess Philippine Charlotte of Prussia (1716–1801)
- Georg Matthias Monn (1717–1750)
- Hinrich Philip Johnsen (1717–1779)
- Antonio Maria Mazzoni (1717–1785)
- Johann Wenzel Anton Stamitz (1717–1757)
- Francesco Zappa (1717–1803)
- Richard Mudge (1718–1763)
- Wenzel Raimund Birck (1718–1763)
- Placidus von Camerloher (1718–1782)
- Nicola Conforto (1718–1793)
- Mlle Duval (1718 – after 1775)
- Giuseppe Scarlatti (1718/1723–1777)
- Johan Nicolaas Lentz (c. 1719–1782)
- Jean Baur (1719–1773)
- Leopold Mozart (1719–1787)
- William Walond Sr. (1719–1768)
- Louis-François Joseph Patouart (1719 – 1793)
- Johann Friedrich Agricola (1720–1774)
- Johann Christoph Altnickol (1720–1759)
- Christophe Le Menu de Saint Philibert (1720–1774)
- Carlo Antonio Campioni (1720–1788)
- Gioacchino Cocchi (1720–1804)
- Pietro Denis (1720–1790)
- Bernhard Joachim Hagen (1720–1787)
- Adolph Carl Kunzen (1720–1781)
- Maria Teresa Agnesi Pinottini (1720–1795)
- Joan Baptista Pla (c. 1720–1773)
- Louis Aubert (1720–1800)
- Quirino Gasparini (1721–1778)
- Matthias Vanden Gheyn (1721–1785)
- Pieter Hellendaal (1721–1799)
- Johann Philipp Kirnberger (1721–1783)
- John Garth (1721–1810)
- Sebastián Ramón de Albero y Añaños (1722–1756)
- Johann Ernst Bach II (1722–1777)
- Georg Anton Benda (1722–1795)
- Pietro Nardini (1722–1793)
- Carl Friedrich Abel (1723–1787)
- Christian Ernst Graf (1723–1804)
- Anna Amalia Princess of Prussia (1723–1787)
- Giovanni Marco Rutini (1723–1797)
- Francesco Uttini (1723–1795)
- Claude Balbastre (1724–1799)
- Giovanni Battista Cirri (1724–1808)
- Jan Adam Gallina (1724–1773)
- Maria Antonia Walpurgis, Princess of Bavaria, Electress of Saxony (1724–1780)
- Santa della Pietà (fl. 1725–1750, d. after 1774)
- Rafael Antonio Castellanos (1725–1791)
- Domenico Fischietti (c. 1725 – c. 1810)
- Giovanni Battista Gervasio (c. 1725 – c. 1785)
- Antonio Lolli (1725–1802)
- Johann Becker (1726–1803)
- Miss Davis (c. 1726 – after 1755)
- Karl Kohaut (1726–1784)
- François-André Danican Philidor (1726–1795)
- Joseph Starzer (c. 1726–1787)
- Joseph Anton Steffan, or Josef Antonín Štěpán (1726–1797)
- Pasquale Anfossi (1727–1797)
- Pierre Montan Berton (1727–1780)
- Johann Gottlieb Goldberg (1727–1756)
- Friedrich Hartmann Graf (1727–1795)
- Henry Harington (1727–1816) ()
- Johann Wilhelm Hertel (1727–1789)
- François Martin (1727–1757)
- Tommaso Traetta (1727–1779)
- Armand-Louis Couperin (1727–1789)
- Franz Asplmayr (1728–1786)
- Michele Stratico (1728–1783)
- Pietro Alessandro Guglielmi (1728–1804)
- Johann Adam Hiller (1728–1804)
- Niccolò Piccinni (1728–1800)
- Johann Gottfried Müthel (1728–1788)
- Hermann Raupach (1728–1778)
- Anton Cajetan Adlgasser (1729–1777)
- Florian Leopold Gassmann (1729–1774)
- Francesco Saverio Giai, or Giaj (1729–1801) (, )
- Pierre van Maldere (1729–1768)
- Pierre-Alexandre Monsigny (1729–1817)
- František Xaver Pokorný (1729–1794)
- Giuseppe Sarti (1729–1802)
- Antonio Soler (1729–1783)

== Middle Classical era composers (born 1730–1750) ==
- Capel Bond (1730–1790)
- Pasquale Errichelli (1730–1785)
- Tommaso Giordani (c. 1730–1806)
- William Jackson (1730–1803)
- Antonín Kammel (1730–1784)
- Cristiano Giuseppe Lidarti (1730–1795)
- Giovanni Meneghetti (c. 1730–1794)
- Georg Pasterwitz (1730–1803)
- Antonio Sacchini (1730–1786)
- Christian Cannabich (1731–1798)
- František Xaver Dušek (1731–1799)
- Elisabetta de Gambarini (1731–1765)
- Gaetano Pugnani (1731–1798)
- Théodore-Jean Tarade (1731–1788)
- Carlo Giuseppe Toeschi (1731–1788)
- Pierre Vachon (1731–1803)
- Johann Christoph Friedrich Bach (1732–1795)
- František Xaver Brixi (1732–1771)
- Giuseppe Demachi (1732 – c. 1791)
- Thomas Erskine, Earl of Kellie (1732–1781)
- Johann Christian Kittel (1732–1809)
- Joseph Haydn (1732–1809)
- Gian Francesco de Majo, or "Ciccio" (1732–1770)
- Josina van Aerssen, or Josina van Boetzelaer (1733–1787)
- Thomas Sanders Dupuis (1733–1796)
- Anton Fils, or Filtz (1733–1760)
- Johann Christian Fischer (1733–1800)
- Istvánffy Benedek (1733–1778) Hungarian form of Benedek Istvánffy
- Thomas Linley the elder (1733–1795)
- Giacomo Tritto (1733–1824)
- Franz Ignaz Beck (1734–1809)
- Jean-Jacques Beauvarlet Charpentier (1734–1794)
- Benjamin Cooke (1734–1793)
- François-Joseph Gossec (1734–1829)
- Karl von Ordóñez (1734–1786)
- Jean-Baptiste Rey (1734–1810)
- Luka Sorkočević (1734–1789)
- Ignazio Spergher (1734–1808)
- Johann Christian Bach (1735–1782)
- John Bennett (c. 1735–1784)
- Giovanni Battista Cervellini (1735–1801)
- John Collett (c. 1735?–1775) ()
- Johann Gottfried Eckard (1735–1809)
- Mme Papavoine (born c. 1735; fl. 1755–61)
- Anton Schweitzer (1735–1787)
- Johann Schobert (c. 1735–1767)
- Ernst Wilhelm Wolf (1735–1792)
- Johann Georg Albrechtsberger (1736–1809)
- Hélène-Louise Demars (born c. 1736)
- Carl Friedrich Christian Fasch (1736–1800)
- Ignaz Fränzl (1736–1811)
- Johann Christoph Kellner (1736–1803)
- Antonio Tozzi (1736–1812)
- Élisabeth de Haulteterre (fl. 1737–1768)
- Josef Mysliveček (1737–1781)
- Michael Haydn (1737–1806)
- Philippe-Jacques Meyer (1737–1819)
- Friedrich Schwindl (1737–1786)
- Philip Hayes (1738–1797)
- William Herschel (1738–1822)
- Leopold Hofmann (1738–1793)
- Jean-François Tapray (1738–1819)
- Anna Bon di Venezia (c. 1739 – after 1767)
- Carl Ditters von Dittersdorf (1739–1799)
- Friedrich Wilhelm Rust (1739–1796)
- Johann Baptist Wanhal (1739–1813)
- Anna Amalia, Duchess of Saxe-Weimar-Eisenach (1739–1807)
- Mlle Guerin (born c. 1739, fl. 1755)
- Agata della Pietà (fl. c. 1740 – c. 1800)
- Michael Arne (1740–1786)
- Samuel Arnold (1740–1802)
- Joseph Corfe (1740–1820) ()
- Ernst Eichner (1740–1777)
- Luigi Gatti (1740–1817)
- Guillaume Lasceux (1740–1831)
- Elisabeth Olin (1740–1828)
- Giovanni Paisiello (1740–1816)
- Samuel Webbe the elder (1740–1816)
- Johann André (1741–1799)
- François Hippolyte Barthélemon (1741–1808)
- Alexandro Marie Antoin Fridzeri (1741–1819)
- André Ernest Modeste Grétry (1741–1813)
- Franz Xaver Hammer (1741–1817)
- Honoré Langlé (1741–1807)
- Andrea Luchesi (1741–1801)
- Jean Paul Egide Martini (1741–1816)
- Johann Gottlieb Naumann (1741–1801)
- Václav Pichl (1741–1804)
- Henri-Joseph Rigel (1741–1799)
- Giacomo Rust (1741–1786)
- Luigi Tomasini (1741–1808)
- Anton Zimmermann (1741–1781)
- Jean-Baptiste Davaux (1742–1822)
- Romanus Hoffstetter (1742–1815)
- Jean-Baptiste Krumpholz (1742–1790)
- Simon Le Duc (Leduc) (1742–1777)
- Vasily Pashkevich (1742–1797)
- Anton Ferdinand Tietz (1742–1811)
- Maria Carolina Wolf (1742–1820)
- Antoine-Laurent Baudron (1742-1830)
- Luigi Boccherini (1743–1805)
- Carlo Franchi (c. 1743 – after 1779)
- Giuseppe Gazzaniga (1743–1818)
- Franz Nikolaus Novotny (1743–1773)
- Yekaterina Vorontsova-Dashkova (1743–1810)
- João Pedro de Almeida Mota (1744–1817)
- Josef Bárta (c. 1744–1787)
- Joseph Beer (1744–1811)
- Anne Louise Brillon de Jouy (1744–1824)
- Gaetano Brunetti (1744–1798)
- Marianna von Martines (1744–1812)
- Yekaterina Sinyavina (died 1784)
- Johann Michael Bach III (1745–1820)
- Joseph Bengraf, or József Bengráf (1745–1791) ()
- Maxim Berezovsky (c. 1745–1777)
- Joseph Bologne, Chevalier de Saint-Georges (1745–1799)
- João de Sousa Carvalho (1745 – c. 1799)
- Georg Druschetzky (1745–1819)
- Nicolas-Jean Lefroid de Méreaux (1745–1797)
- Johann Peter Salomon (1745–1815)
- Maddalena Laura Sirmen (1745–1818)
- Carl Stamitz (1745–1801)
- Ferdinando Gasparo Turrini (1745 – c. 1820)
- Jan Nepomuk Vent, or Johann Wendt (1745–1801)
- Jan Stefani (1746–1829)
- Marie Emmanuelle Bayon Louis (1746–1825)
- William Billings (1746–1800)
- Giuseppe Cambini (1746 – c. 1825)
- James Hook (1746–1827)
- Ludwig Wenzel Lachnith (1746–1820)
- Johann Friedrich Peter (1746–1813)
- Giovanni Punto, or Jan Václav Stich (1746–1803)
- Joseph Quesnel (1746–1809)
- Johann Wilhelm Hässler (1747–1822)
- Ivan Mane Jarnović, or Giovanni Mane Giornovichi (1747–1804)
- Ivan Khandoshkin (1747–1804)
- Leopold Kozeluch (1747–1818)
- Justin Morgan (1747–1798)
- Carl Marianus Paradeiser (1747–1775)
- Johann Abraham Peter Schulz (1747–1800)
- Joachim Albertini, or Gioacchino Albertini (1748–1812)
- Francesco Azopardi (1748–1809)
- Josef Fiala (1748–1816)
- Étienne-Joseph Floquet (1748–1785)
- Emanuel Aloys Förster (1748–1823)
- John Mahon (c. 1748–1834)
- Christian Gottlob Neefe (1748–1798)
- Theodor von Schacht (1748–1823)
- William Shield (1748–1829)
- Joseph Schuster (1748–1812)
- Henriette Adélaïde Villard Beaumesnil (1748–1813)
- Domenico Cimarosa (1749–1801)
- Jean-Louis Duport (1749–1819)
- Jean-Frédéric Edelmann (1749–1794)
- Johann Nikolaus Forkel (1749–1818)
- Antonín Kraft (c. 1749–1820)
- Georg Joseph Vogler (1749–1814)
- Polly Young, also known as Maria Barthélemon (1749–1799)
- Marija Zubova (1749–1799)

== Late Classical era composers (born 1750–1770) ==
- Vincenta Da Ponte (fl. second half 18th century)
- Giovanni Cifolelli (c. 1750s, fl. 1764)
- Elizabeth Anspach (1750–1828)
- Elizabeth Joanetta Catherine von Hagen (1750–1809/1810)
- Antonio Rosetti (c. 1750–1792)
- Antonio Salieri (1750–1825)
- John Stafford Smith (1750–1836)
- Johannes Matthias Sperger (1750–1812)
- Johann Franz Xaver Sterkel (1750–1817)
- Jean Balthasar Tricklir (1750–1813)
- Dmytro Bortniansky (1751–1825)
- Bartolomeo Campagnoli (1751–1827)
- Giuseppe Giordani, also known as Giordanello (1751–1798)
- Dietrich Ewald von Grotthuß (1754–1786)
- Jan Křtitel Kuchař (1751–1829)
- Jean-Baptiste Lemoyne (1751–1796)
- Maria Anna Mozart (1751–1829)
- Mary Ann Pownall (1751–1796)
- Corona Schröter (1751–1802)
- William Smethergell (1751–1836) ()
- Mary Ann Wrighten (1751–1796)
- Francesco Bianchi (1752–1810)
- Muzio Clementi (1752–1832)
- Georg Friedrich Fuchs (1752–1821)
- Justin Heinrich Knecht (1752–1817)
- Ludwig August Lebrun (1752–1790)
- John Marsh (1752–1828)
- Josef Reicha (1752–1795)
- Johann Friedrich Reichardt (1752–1814)
- Juliane Reichardt, or Juliane Benda Reichardt (1752–1783)
- Jane Savage (1752/3–1824)
- Niccolò Antonio Zingarelli (1752–1837)
- Jean-Baptiste Bréval (1753–1823)
- Nicolas Dalayrac (1753–1809)
- Franz Anton Dimmler (1753–1827)
- Christian Friedrich Ruppe (1753–1826)
- Johann Baptist Schenk (1753–1836)
- Johann Samuel Schroeter, or Schröter (1753–1788)
- Pedro Étienne Solère (1753–1817)
- Johan Wikmanson (1753–1800)
- Franz Anton Hoffmeister (1754–1812)
- Vicente Martín y Soler (1754–1806)
- Etienne Ozi (1754–1813)
- Anton Stamitz (1754–1798 or 1809)
- Peter Winter (1754–1825)
- Michèl Yost (1754–1786)
- Maria Theresia Ahlefeldt (1755–1810)
- Mateo Pérez de Albéniz (1755–1831)
- Giuseppe Antonio Capuzzi (1755–1818)
- Giuseppe Ferlendis (1755–1802)
- Federigo Fiorillo (1755 – c. 1823)
- Antoine-Frédéric Gresnick (1755–1799)
- John Christopher Moller (1755–1803)
- Jean-Pierre Solié (1755–1812)
- Giovanni Battista Viotti (1755–1824)
- Franz Grill (c. 1756–1793)
- Karel Blažej Kopřiva (1756–1785)
- Francesca Lebrun also Franziska Danzi Lebrun (1756–1791)
- Thomas Linley the younger (1756–1778)
- Wolfgang Amadeus Mozart (1756–1791)
- Joseph Martin Kraus (1756–1792)
- Alexander Reinagle (1756–1809)
- Vincenzo Righini (1756–1812)
- Mikhail Sokolovsky (1756 – after 1795)
- Daniel Gottlob Türk (1756–1813)
- Jan Wański (1756–1830)
- Paul Wranitzky, also Pavel Vranický (1756–1808)
- Antonio Calegari (1757–1828)
- Ignaz Pleyel (1757–1831)
- Alessandro Rolla (1757–1841)
- Harriett Abrams (1758–1821)
- Josepha Barbara Auernhammer (1758–1820)
- Frédéric Blasius, or Matthäus Blasius (1758–1829)
- Benedikt Schack, or Benedikt Žák (1758–1826)
- Carl Siegemund Schönebeck (1758–1806 or after)
- Carl Friedrich Zelter (1758–1832)
- Marianna von Auenbrugger (1759–1782)
- Wilhelm Friedrich Ernst Bach (1759–1845)
- François Devienne (1759–1803)
- Johann Christian Friedrich Haeffner (1759–1833)
- Franz Krommer (1759–1831)
- Maria Theresa von Paradis (1759–1824)
- Maria Rosa Coccia (1759–1833)
- Sophia Maria Westenholz (1759–1838)
- Luigi Cherubini (1760–1842)
- Wojciech Dankowski (c. 1760 – c. 1836)
- Johann Ladislaus Dussek (1760–1812)
- Francesco Gardi (c. 1760 – c. 1810)
- Jean-François Le Sueur, or Lesueur (1760–1837)
- Franz Christoph Neubauer (c. 1760–1795)
- Angelo Tarchi (1760–1814)
- Gaetano Valeri (1760–1822)
- Johann Rudolf Zumsteeg (1760–1802)
- Marie-Elizabeth Cléry (1761 – after 1795)
- Yevstigney Fomin (1761–1800)
- Pierre Gaveaux (1761–1825)
- Friedrich Ludwig Aemilius Kunzen (1761–1817)
- Erik Tulindberg (1761–1814)
- Antonín Vranický, or Anton Wranitzky (1761–1820)
- Adelheid Maria Eichner (1762–1787)
- Jane Mary Guest (1762–1846)
- Jakob Haibel (1762–1826)
- Friedrich Franz Hurka (1762–1805)
- Jérôme-Joseph de Momigny (1762–1842)
- Marcos António da Fonseca Portugal (1762–1830)
- Stephen Storace (1762–1796)
- Franz Tausch (1762–1817)
- Ann Valentine (1762–1842)
- Johann Andreas Amon (1763–1825)
- Franz Danzi (1763–1826)
- Johann Sebastian Demar (1763–1832)
- Domenico Dragonetti (1763–1846)
- Giacomo Gotifredo Ferrari (1763–1842)
- Adalbert Gyrowetz (1763–1850)
- Jean-Xavier Lefèvre (1763–1829)
- Johann Simon Mayr (1763–1845)
- Étienne Méhul (1763–1817)
- Niccolò Moretti (1763–1821)
- Matthew Camidge (1764–1844)
- Franz Lauska (1764–1825)
- Valentino Fioravanti (1764–1837)
- Helene de Montgeroult (1764–1836)
- John Addison (c. 1765–1844)
- Thomas Attwood (1765–1838)
- Anton Eberl (1765–1807)
- Joseph Leopold Eybler (1765–1846)
- Friedrich Heinrich Himmel (1765–1814)
- Michał Kleofas Ogiński (1765–1833)
- Jakub Jan Ryba (1765–1815)
- Daniel Steibelt (1765–1823)
- Johann Friedrich Anton Fleischmann (1766–1798)
- Stepan Degtyarev (1766–1813)
- Vincent Houška (1766–1840)
- Rodolphe Kreutzer (1766–1831)
- Anne-Marie Krumpholtz (1766–1813)
- Ignaz Anton Ladurner (1766–1839)
- Franz Xaver Süssmayr (1766–1803)
- Joseph Weigl (1766–1846)
- Samuel Wesley (1766–1837)
- Caroline Wuiet (1766–1835)
- Henri Montan Berton (1767–1844)
- Amélie-Julie Candeille (1767–1834)
- Ferdinand Fränzl (1767–1833)
- José Maurício Nunes Garcia (1767–1830)
- August Eberhard Müller (1767–1817)
- Wenzel Müller (1767–1835)
- Andreas Romberg (1767–1821)
- Bernhard Romberg (1767–1841)
- Johannes Spech (1767?–1836)
- Artemy Vedel (1767–1808)
- Johann Georg Heinrich Backofen (1768–1830?)
- Carlos Baguer (1768–1808)
- Elizabeth Billington (c.1768–1818)
- Benjamin Carr (1768–1831)
- Margarethe Danzi (1768–1800)
- Domenico Della-Maria (1768–1800)
- Carel Anton Fodor (1768–1846)
- Carl Andreas Goepfert (Göpfert) (1768–1818)
- Filippo Gragnani (1768–1820)
- Louis-Emmanuel Jadin (1768–1853)
- Samuel Webbe the younger (1768–1843)
- Bonifazio Asioli (1769–1832)
- Cecilia Maria Barthélemon (c. 1769–1840)
- Maria Theresa Bland (c. 1769–1838)
- Kateřina Veronika Anna Dusíkova (1769–1833)
- Józef Elsner (1769–1854)
- Giuseppe Farinelli (1769–1836)
- Francesco Gnecco (1769 – c. 1810)
- Johann Georg Lickl (1769–1843)
- Alexey Nikolayevich Titov (1769–1827)
- Madame Ravissa (fl. from 1778; died 1807)

== Classical/Romantic transition composers (born 1770–1799) ==
- João José Baldi (1770–1816)
- Ludwig van Beethoven (1770–1827)
- Ferdinando Carulli (1770–1841)
- Ebenezer Child (1770–1866)
- Édouard Du Puy (1770–1822)
- Peter Hänsel (1770–1831)
- James Hewitt (1770–1827)
- Anton Reicha (1770–1836)
- Christian Heinrich Rinck (1770–1846)
- Jan August Vitásek (1770–1839)
- Adam Valentin Volckmar (1770–1851) ()
- Friedrich Witt (1770–1836)
- Johann Baptist Cramer (1771–1858)
- Mme Delaval (fl. 1791–1802)
- Ferdinando Paer (1771–1839)
- Ján Josef Rösler or Johann Joseph Rösler (1771–1813)
- Antonio Casimir Cartellieri (1772–1807)
- Lucile Grétry (1772–1790)
- Louis Ferdinand, Prince of Prussia (1772–1806)
- Maria Frances Parke (1772–1822)
- François-Louis Perne (1772–1832)
- Josef Triebensee (1772–1846)
- Johann Wilhelm Wilms (1772–1847)
- Sophie Bawr (1773–1860)
- Pietro Generali (1773–1832)
- Wenzeslaus Matiegka (1773–1830)
- Joseph Wölfl (1773–1812)
- Bartolomeo Bortolazzi (1773–1820)
- Pierre Rode (1774–1830)
- Gaspare Spontini (1774–1851)
- Václav Tomášek (1774–1850)
- Christoph Ernst Friedrich Weyse (1774–1842)
- Catterino Cavos (1775–1840)
- Johann Anton André (1775–1842)
- François-Adrien Boieldieu (1775–1834)
- João Domingos Bomtempo (1775–1842)
- Maria Brizzi Giorgi (1775–1822)
- Bernhard Crusell (1775–1838)
- Sophia Corri Dussek (1775–1847)
- Margaret Essex (1775–1807)
- François de Fossa (1775–1849)
- Sophie Gail (1775–1819)
- Nicolas Isouard (1775–1818)
- José Ángel Lamas (1775–1814)
- Maria Hester Park (1775–1822)
- Ernst Theodor Amadeus Hoffmann (1776–1822)
- Hyacinthe Jadin (1776–1800)
- Joseph Küffner (1776–1856)
- Philipp Jakob Riotte (1776–1856)
- Ignaz von Seyfried (1776–1841)
- Ludwig Berger (1777–1839)
- Pauline Duchambge (1778–1858)
- Johann Nepomuk Hummel (1778–1837)
- Sigismund Neukomm (1778–1858)
- Fernando Sor (1778–1839)
- Rochus Dedler (1779–1822)
- Joachim Nicolas Eggert (1779–1813)
- William Knyvett (1779–1856)
- Nikolaus von Krufft (1779–1818)
- Louise Reichardt (1779–1826)
- Luigi Antonio Calegari (1780–1849)
- Conradin Kreutzer (1780–1849)
- Louis François Dauprat (1781–1868)
- Anton Diabelli (1781–1858)
- Mauro Giuliani (1781–1829)
- Anthony Philip Heinrich (1781–1861)
- Sophie Lebrun (1781–1863)
- François Joseph Naderman (1781–1835)
- Karl Stefan Aichelburg (1782–1817)
- Daniel Auber (1782–1871)
- Carlo Coccia (1782–1873)
- John Field (1782–1837)
- Niccolò Paganini (1782–1840)
- Charlotta Seuerling (1782–1828)
- Friedrich Dotzauer (1783–1860)
- Teresa Belloc-Giorgi (1784–1855)
- Martin-Joseph Mengal (1784–1851)
- Francesco Morlacchi (1784–1841)
- George Onslow (1784–1853)
- Ferdinand Ries (1784–1838)
- Louis Spohr (1784–1859)
- Friedrich Kalkbrenner (1785–1849)
- Alexandre Pierre François Boëly (1785–1858)
- Bettina Brentano (1785–1859)
- Catherina Cibbini-Kozeluch (1785–1858)
- Isabella Colbran (1785–1845)
- Karol Kurpiński (1785–1857)
- George Pinto (1785–1806)
- Fanny Krumpholtz Pittar (1785–1815)
- Marie Bigot (1786–1820)
- Henry Rowley Bishop (1786–1855)
- Friedrich Kuhlau (1786–1832)
- Pietro Raimondi (1786–1853)
- Friedrich Schneider (1786–1853)
- Le Sénéchal de Kerkado (1786–1805)
- Carl Maria von Weber (1786–1826)
- Alexander Alyabyev (1787–1851)
- Michele Carafa (1787–1872)
- Johann Peter Pixis (1788–1874)
- Simon Sechter (1788–1867)
- Elena Asachi (1789–1877)
- Nicolas Bochsa (1789–1856)
- Frederic Ernest Fesca (1789–1826)
- Maria Agata Szymanowska (1789–1831)
- Harriet Browne (1790–1858)
- Carl Czerny (1791–1857)
- Louis Joseph Ferdinand Herold (1791–1833)
- Giacomo Meyerbeer (1791–1864)
- Franz Xaver Mozart (1791–1844)
- Carlo Evasio Soliva (1791–1853)
- Jan Václav Voříšek (1791–1825)
- Cipriani Potter (1792–1871)
- Gioachino Rossini (1792–1868)
- Hedda Wrangel (1792–1833)
- Gertrude van den Bergh (1793–1840)
- Bernhard Klein (1793–1832)
- Caroline Ridderstolpe (1793–1878)
- Amalie, Princess of Saxony (1794–1870)
- Ignaz Moscheles (1794–1870)
- Nikolaos Mantzaros (1795–1872)
- Heinrich Marschner (1795–1861)
- Saverio Mercadante (1795–1870)
- Franz Berwald (1796–1868)
- Helene Liebmann (1796–1835)
- Carl Loewe (1796–1869)
- Mathilda d'Orozco (1796–1863)
- Giovanni Pacini (1796–1867)
- Emilie Zumsteeg (1796–1857)
- Luigi Castellacci (1797–1845)
- Gaetano Donizetti (1797–1848)
- Franz Schubert (1797–1828)
- Annette von Droste-Hülshoff (1797–1848)
- Antonio Rolla (1798–1837)
- Olivia Buckley (1799–1847)
- Maria Fredrica von Stedingk (1799–1868)
- Fromental Halévy (1799–1862)
- Oscar I of Sweden (1799–1859)

== See also ==
- List of Renaissance composers
- List of Baroque composers
- List of Romantic-era composers
- List of classical music composers by era
