= 1700 in music =

The year 1700 in music involved some significant events.

== Events ==
- John Eccles is appointed Master of the King's Musick.
- William Croft returns to the Chapel Royal, where he had been educated, as a "gentleman organist".
- William Corbett becomes director of the New Theatre at Lincoln's Inn Fields.
- Johann Sebastian Bach becomes a chorister at St. Michael's Church, Lüneburg.
- Tomaso Albinoni is employed as a violinist by Ferdinando Carlo, Duke of Mantua.
- An inventory of musical instruments kept by Prince Ferdinando de Medici provides the first evidence for the existence of the pianoforte.

== Classical music ==
- Tomaso Giovanni Albinoni – Sinfonie e concerti op. 2
- Johann Sebastian Bach
  - Prelude and Fugue in D minor, BWV 549a
  - Christ, der du bist der helle Tag, BWV 766
- John Blow – Amphion Anglicus
- Jacques Boyvin – Livre d'orgue II
- Sébastien de Brossard – O miraculum!, SdB.006
- Antonio Caldara
  - La frode della castità
  - Il trionfo dell'innocenza
- Choice Collection of Ayres for the Harpsichord or Spinnet by John Blow, Jeremiah Clarke, Francis Piggott, John Barrett and William Croft
- Jeremiah Clarke – Prince of Denmark's March (approximate date)
- Arcangelo Corelli – XII Suonati a violino e violone o cimbalo (Op. 5), published in Rome
- John Eccles – The Mad Lover
- Johann Caspar Ferdinand Fischer – Musicalischer Parnassus
- Godfrey Keller
  - The Royal Trumpett-Suite
  - 8 Trio Sonatas
- Johann Kuhnau – Musicalische Vorstellung einiger biblischer Historien (Biblical sonatas), published in Leipzig
- Johann Sigismund Kusser
  - 6 Overture Suites 'Apollon Enjoué'
  - 6 Overture Suites 'Festin des Muses'
- Isabella Leonarda – Motetti a voce sola con istromenti, Op.20
- Alessandro Scarlatti – Il rosignolo se scioglie il volo, H.318

== Opera ==
- Carlo Agostino Badia – La costanza d'Ulisse
- André Campra – Hésione
- John Eccles – The Judgment of Paris
- Alessandro Scarlatti – Eracles

== Publications ==
- Jacques Boyvin – Traité abrégé de l'accompagnement
- Johann Kuhnau – Der musicalische Quack-Salber
- Friedrich Erhardt Niedt – Musicalische Handleitung

== Births ==
- January 14 – Picander, librettist for Johann Sebastian Bach (died 1764)
- March 13 – Michel Blavet, flautist (died 1768)
- April 2 – Francesca Cuzzoni, opera singer (died 1770)
- probable
  - Sebastian Bodinus, composer (d. 1759)
  - Jean-Baptiste Masse, cellist and composer (died c.1757)

== Deaths ==
- January 16 – Antonio Draghi, opera composer (born c.1634)
- February 8 – Filippo Acciaiuoli, opera composer, librettist and manager (born 1637)
- June 6 – Wespazjan Kochowski, historian, poet and writer (born 1633)
  - August Kühnel, viola da gamba player and composer (b. 1645)
  - Monsieur de Sainte-Colombe, violist and composer (born c.1640)
