= Senechal =

Senechal or Sénéchal may refer to:

== People ==
- Florian Sénéchal, French racing cyclist
- Marjorie Senechal (née Wikler), American mathematician and historian of science
- Michel Sénéchal, French tenor
- Robert Sénéchal, French industrialist/motor manufacturer, racing driver and pilot
- Sean Senechal, American futurist
- Le Sénéchal de Kerkado, French composer

== Other uses ==
- Sénéchal (automobile)

== See also ==
- Seneschal
