= El hijo pródigo =

El hijo pródigo may refer to:

== Books ==
- El hijo pródigo, Mexican literary review edited by Alí Chumacero
- El hijo pródigo,(also known as Auto sacramental del hijo pródigo) religious play Juan de Espinosa Medrano
- partida del hijo pródigo / regreso del hijo pródigo 1807 Carlos Baguer

== Film and TV ==
- El hijo pródigo, 1969 Mexican film directed by Servando González with Libertad Lamarque
- El hijo pródigo, 2013 film Cinema of Chile

== Music ==
- El hijo pródigo, 1976 ballet by Federico Moreno Torroba
- El hijo pródigo, album by Avalanch 2005
