= Philippe Meyer =

Philippe Meyer may refer to:

- Philippe Meyer (politician) (born 1969), French politician
- Philippe Meyer (swimmer) (born 1971), Swiss swimmer
- Philippe-Jacques Meyer (born 1737), French composer
