= Compton Census =

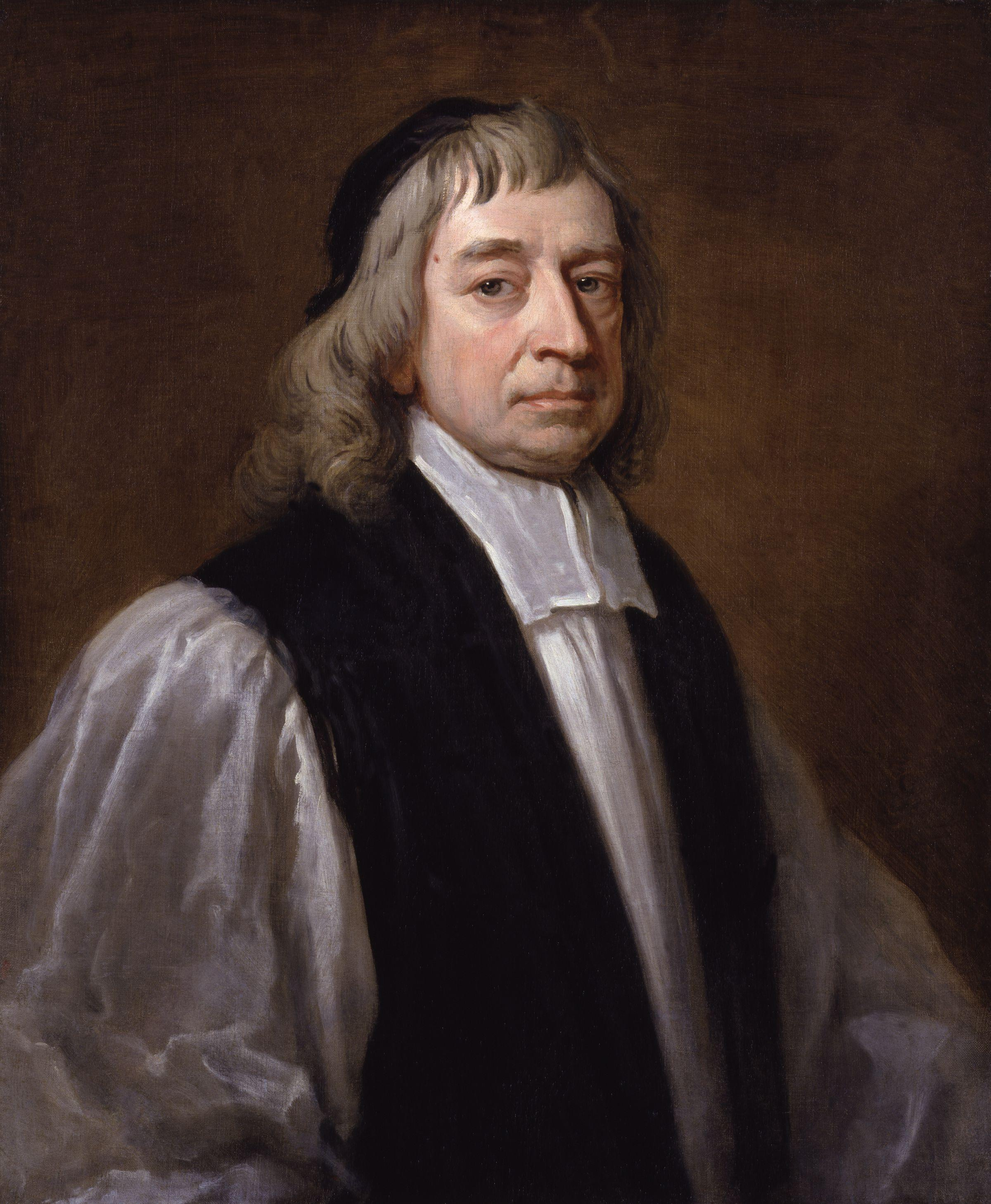
Portrait of Henry Compton by Godfrey Kneller

The Compton Census was a census of the population of England and Wales held in 1676 to determine their religious affiliation.

Charles II's Lord Treasurer, Lord Danby, was pursuing a pro-Anglican policy. The King was sceptical of this, believing that it would unite the Nonconformists into a powerful bloc that would be too strong to be overcome. Danby devised an ecclesiastical census of the population to demonstrate the numerical inferiority of Nonconformists. As the Archbishop of Canterbury, Gilbert Sheldon, was too infirm Danby turned to the Bishop of London, Henry Compton. Compton's instructions were:

First, What number of persons or at least families are by common account and estimation inhabiting within each parish subject under them [i.e. the Bishops]. Secondly, what number of Popish recusants, or such as are suspected of recusancy, are there among such inhabitants at present? Thirdly, what number of other Dissenters are resident in such parishes, which either obstinately refuse, or wholly absent themselves from, the Communion of the Church of England at such time as by law they are required?

After Compton received the results, he estimated the proportion of Anglicans to Nonconformists as 23 to 1; Anglicans to Roman Catholics 179 to 1; Anglicans and Nonconformists to Roman Catholics 187 to 1.
