= Teofilo Macchetti =

Italian composer

Teofilo Macchetti (Venice, March 3, 1632 – Pisa, 1714) was an Italian composer and music theorist.

== Life ==
Macchetti studied music in Venice and joined the Benedictine Order, which assigned him to the monastery in Rovigo as solicitor in 1669. He stayed in Rovigo until 1674, but his interest for history and music caused him to travel for research to Venice (in 1672 and in 1673) and to Rome, where he stayed for four years (from 1675 to 1679). After that, he made stops in Loreto and Spoleto, and then settled in Pisa, where he became Chapel Master of the Duomo in 1681. Macchetti kept this role for the rest of his life, supervising the musical life in Pisa and teaching regularly (his most well-known student was Giovan Carlo Maria Clari); however, he continued to travel for his studies of music history (documented stays in Rome, Volterra, Siena, and numerous other Tuscan cities).

== Conti di musiche ==
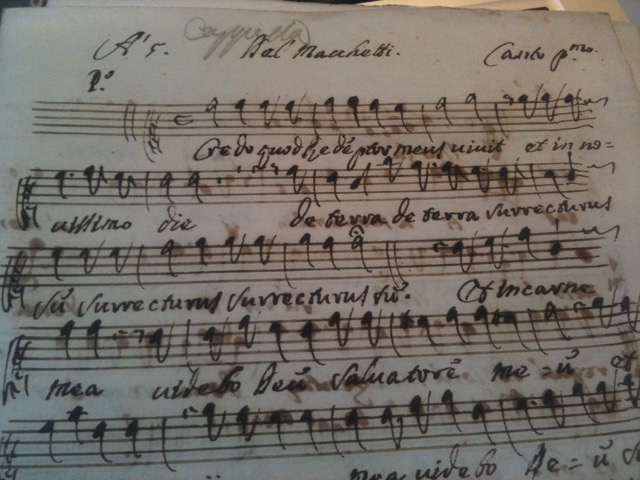
Autographed manuscript of a Credo by Teofilo Macchetti (1632-1714), preserved in the Musical Archive of Opera Primaziale Pisana.

While working, Macchetti kept a detailed diary, entitled Conti di musiche (translated as Tales of Music, or Musical Tales, or Tales from Music), which is preserved today in the Biblioteca Universitaria of Pisa. From the notes in his diary, precious information regarding the musical activity of a 1600-1700 chapel can be understood. Macchetti describes his duties, the music that was performed, and his academic activity in minute detail. In addition, he documented many distinctive traits of the music performed at that time.

== Curiosità musicali ==
His interest for antique music is gathered in Curiosità musicali (translated as Musical Curiosity, or Music Trivia) which dates back to beginning in 1711 and is preserved today in the Biblioteca Universitaria of Pisa. In Curiosità, Macchetti verifies many anecdotes about antique music circulating at the time (for example, the anecdote that Pythagoras understood the concept of musical consonance by listening to the sound of hammers on anvils), attests the circulation of medieval dissertations as well as those of the Renaissance in Italy (Macchetti demonstrated knowing very well the dissertations of Johannes de Muris, Johannes Tinctoris, Glarean, Vincenzo Galilei and Athanasius Kircher) reflecting on the concept of tempo, and studied the evolution of performance customs (for example, he observed how the mass Aeterna Christi munera by Giovanni Pierluigi da Palestrina was performed more quickly over the years). The Curiosità represents the first Italian attempt at creating a true and proper History of Music, which precedes, by almost 40 years, the most famous treaty of Giovanni Battista Martini in which he recognizes Curiosità musicali as its essential foundation. The angle of Curiosità is much more practical than theoretical, and it also documents the customs of performance of the time. This last fact renders it a priceless direct source for performance customs of sacred music of the 1700s.

== Works ==
In Conti di musiche, Macchetti describes the performances of many of his works, but it seems today that only two compositions remain: Sacri concerti di salmi, printed in Bologna in 1687 (samples of this print are found at the Museo internazionale e biblioteca della musica of Bologna and at the Biblioteca Diocesana of Lucca), and the Responsori della liturgia dei defunti. It is assumed that consistent traces of his production can be preserved indirectly (for example, copies and re-elaborated versions by his students or other successors in the chapel at the Cathedral of Pisa) or even autographs found at the Musical History Archive at the Opera Primaziale Pisana. As aforementioned, the Biblioteca Universitaria of Pisa preserves his written works, some of which have been digitallized.
