= Lodovico Giustini =

Italian composer

Lodovico Giustini (12 December 1685 – 7 February 1743) was an Italian composer and keyboard player of the late Baroque and early Classical eras. He was the first known composer ever to write music for the piano.

== Life ==
Giustini was born in Pistoia, of a family of musicians which can be traced back to the early 17th century; coincidentally he was born in the same year as Bach, Scarlatti, and Handel. Giustini's father was organist at the Congregazione dello Spirito Santo, a Jesuit-affiliated group, and an uncle, Domenico Giustini, was also a composer of sacred music.

In 1725, on his father's death, Giustini became organist at the Congregazione dello Spirito Santo, and acquired a reputation there as a composer of sacred music: mostly cantatas and oratorios. In 1728, he collaborated with Giovanni Carlo Maria Clari on a set of Lamentations which were performed that year. In 1734, he was hired as organist at S Maria dell'Umiltà, the Cathedral of Pistoia, a position he held for the rest of his life. In addition to playing the organ at both religious institutions, he performed on the harpsichord at numerous locations, often in his own oratorios.

== Works and influence ==
Giustini's main fame rests on his work 12 Sonate da cimbalo di piano e forte detto volgarmente di martelletti, Op.1, published in Florence in 1732, which is the earliest music in any genre written specifically for the piano. They are dedicated to Dom António de Bragança, the younger brother of King João V of Portugal (the Portuguese court was one of the few places where the early piano was frequently played).

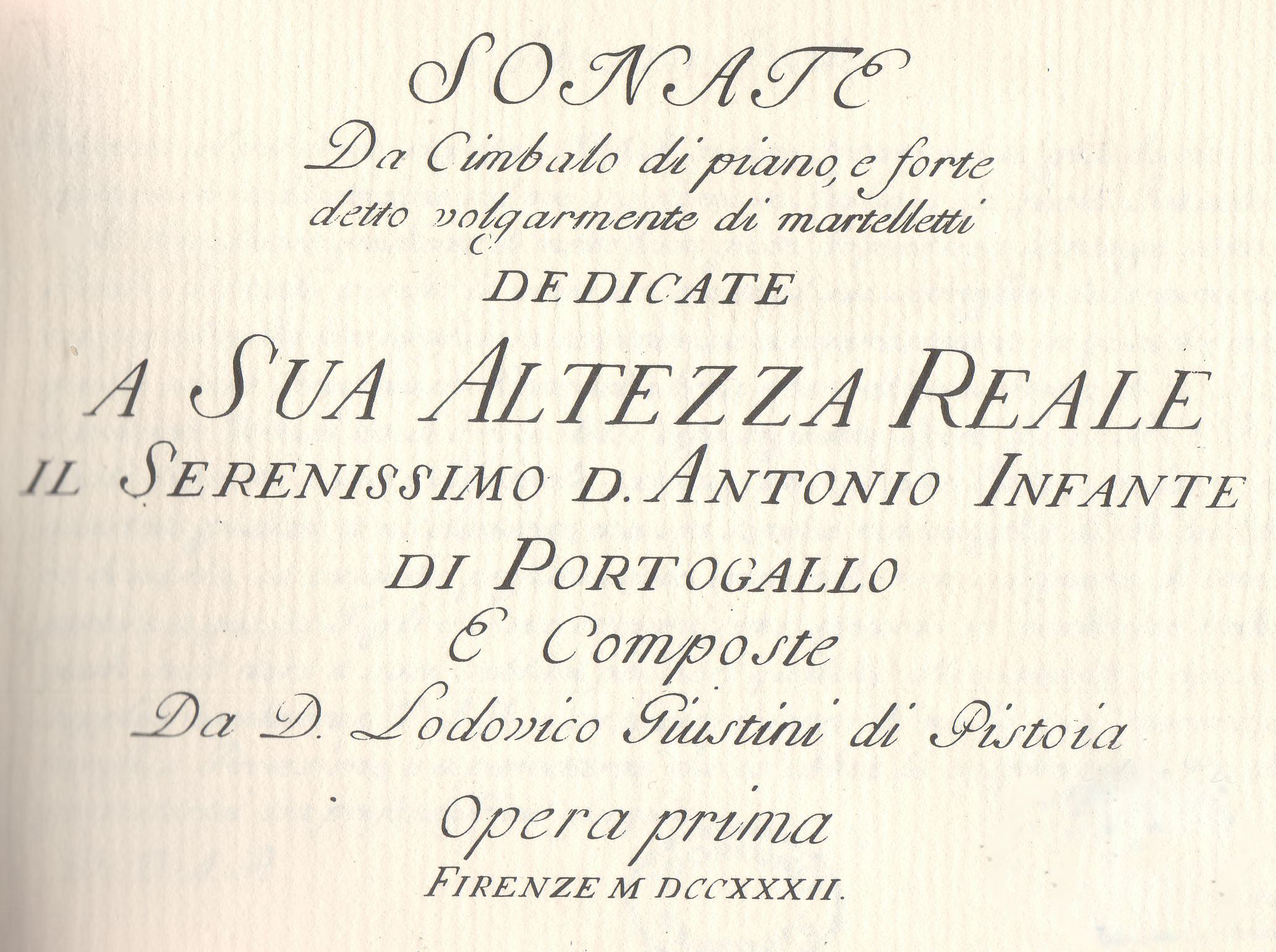
Sonate frontispiece, 1732.

These pieces, which are sonate da chiesa, with alternating fast and slow sections (four or five movements per sonata), predate all other music specifically written for the piano by about 30 years. Giustini used all the expressive capabilities of the instrument, such as wide dynamic contrast: expressive possibilities which were not available on other keyboard instruments of the time. Harmonically the pieces are transitional between late Baroque and early Classical period practice, and include innovations such as augmented sixth chords and modulations to remote keys.

James Parakilas points out that it is quite surprising that these works should have been published at all. At the time of composition, there existed only a very small number of pianos, owned mainly by royalty. He conjectures that publication of the work was meant as an honor to Giustini; it "represents a gesture of magnificent presentation to a royal musician, rather than an act of commercial promotion."

While many performances of his large-scale sacred works are documented, all of that music is lost, with the exception of fragments such as scattered arias. Giustini's fame rests on his publication of his set of piano pieces, although they seem to have attracted little interest at the time.

== References and further reading ==
- Edward Higginbottom, "Lodovico Giustini", The New Grove Dictionary of Music and Musicians, ed. Stanley Sadie. 20 vol. London, Macmillan Publishers Ltd., 1980. ISBN 1-56159-174-2
- Jean Grundy Fanelli: "Lodovico Giustini", Grove Music Online ed. L. Macy (Accessed November 14, 2005), (subscription access) (Note: the articles in the two editions of Grove are by different authors, and each contains unique material)
- James Parakilas, Piano Roles: 300 Years of Life with the Piano. New Haven: Yale University Press, 1999. ISBN 0-300-08055-7.
- Lodovico Giustini, The 12 Sonatas for piano, ed. Dominique Ferran, 3 vol. Paris-San Diego, Drake Mabry Publishing, 2003.
- Freeman, Daniel E. "Lodovico Giustini and the Emergence of the Keyboard Sonata in Italy." Anuario musical 58 (2003):111-30.
