= Mlle Duval =

French composer

- Born: c. 1718
- Died: 1775
- Era: Classical
- Works: Les Génies, ou Les caractères de l'Amour Du Dieu qui fait aimer

Mlle Duval (short for Mademoiselle Duval) (c. 1718 – after 1775) was an 18th-century French composer who wrote the second opera by a woman ever performed at the Paris Opera.

== Biography ==
Mlle Duval, whose first name is unknown, was a French composer and dancer who was an accomplished harpsichordist. A letter to the Journal des nouvelles de Paris in 1736 reported she was known by the name La Légende because she was an illegitimate child, possibly indicating that Duval was a stage name. She may be the same person as an 18th-century French composer who is identified as Louise Duval (1704–1769), though their birth and death dates do not appear to match up.

Much of what is known about Mlle Duval's life comes from mentions in contemporary accounts; for instance, her birth date is deduced from a letter stating that she was 18 in 1736, the year she composed her best-known work, the opera ballet Les Génies, ou Les caractères de l'Amour (Geniuses, or Love's Characters). The libretto of Les Génies, which was written in the heroic ballet style, was by Fleury de Lyon, and its publication was sponsored by the Prince of Carignan. Les Génies premiered at the Paris Opera in October 1736, becoming only the second opera by a woman to be performed at the Opera; the first had been by Jacquet de la Guerre forty years earlier. It ran for nine performances, with the music being praised by critics as well composed and its composer singled out as a "young person with much talent". A review in the Mercure de France reported that she accompanied the full performance of her opera on harpsichord.

Another of her compositions is the duet Du Dieu qui fait aimer (Of God Who Causes Love), which was published in 1736. However, an air, Tout ce que je vois me rappelle (Everything I See Reminds Me), which has been attributed to her, is now thought to be by Marie-Elizabeth Cléry.

One source states that she performed at the Académie Royale de Musique and retired with a substantial pension, while another notes her as a former actress and supernumerary dancer with the Paris Opera. However, as the name Duval is a common one in France, it is not certain that all such references are to the composer.

Mlle Duval's death date is uncertain; one account has her dying as early as 1769, but a more detailed account has her alive in 1775.

== Selected works ==
- Les Génies, ou Les caractères de l'Amour (opera ballet)
- Du Dieu qui fait aimer (duet)
