= Portrait of Henry Compton =

Painting by Godfrey Kneller

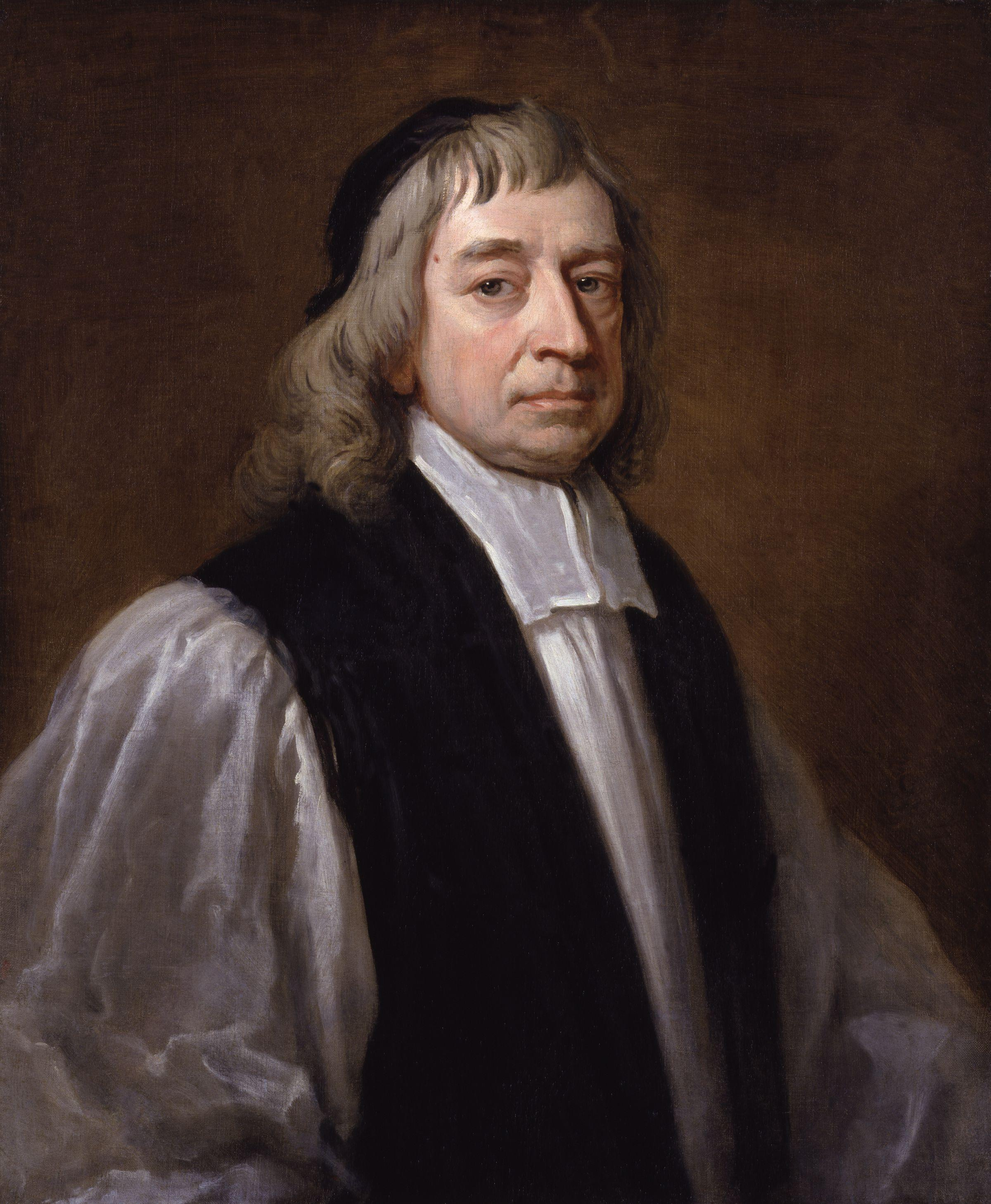
- Artist: Godfrey Kneller
- Year: c.1712
- Type: Oil on canvas, portrait
- Dimensions: 75.6 cm × 63.5 cm (29.8 in × 25.0 in)
- Location: National Portrait Gallery, London

Portrait of Henry Compton is a c.1712 portrait painting by the German-born artist Godfrey Keller. It depicts the Anglican bishop Henry Compton. As Bishop of London, he had been noted as one of the Immortal Seven who issued the invitation for William III to sail for England in 1688 leading to the Glorious Revolution. He performed the ceremony at the coronation of William III and Mary II in 1689.

The Lübeck-born Kneller settled in Britain where he became the nation's leading portraitist. The painting was produced during the reign of Queen Anne when Compton remained a prominent figure. Today the painting is in the collection of the London`National Portrait Gallery in London.

== Bibliography ==
- Ingamells, John. National Portrait Gallery Later Stuart Portraits, 1685-1714. National Portrait Gallery, 2009.
- Piper, David. Catalogue of the Seventeenth Century Portraits in the National Portrait Gallery 1625-1714. 1963.
