= List of classical music composers by era =

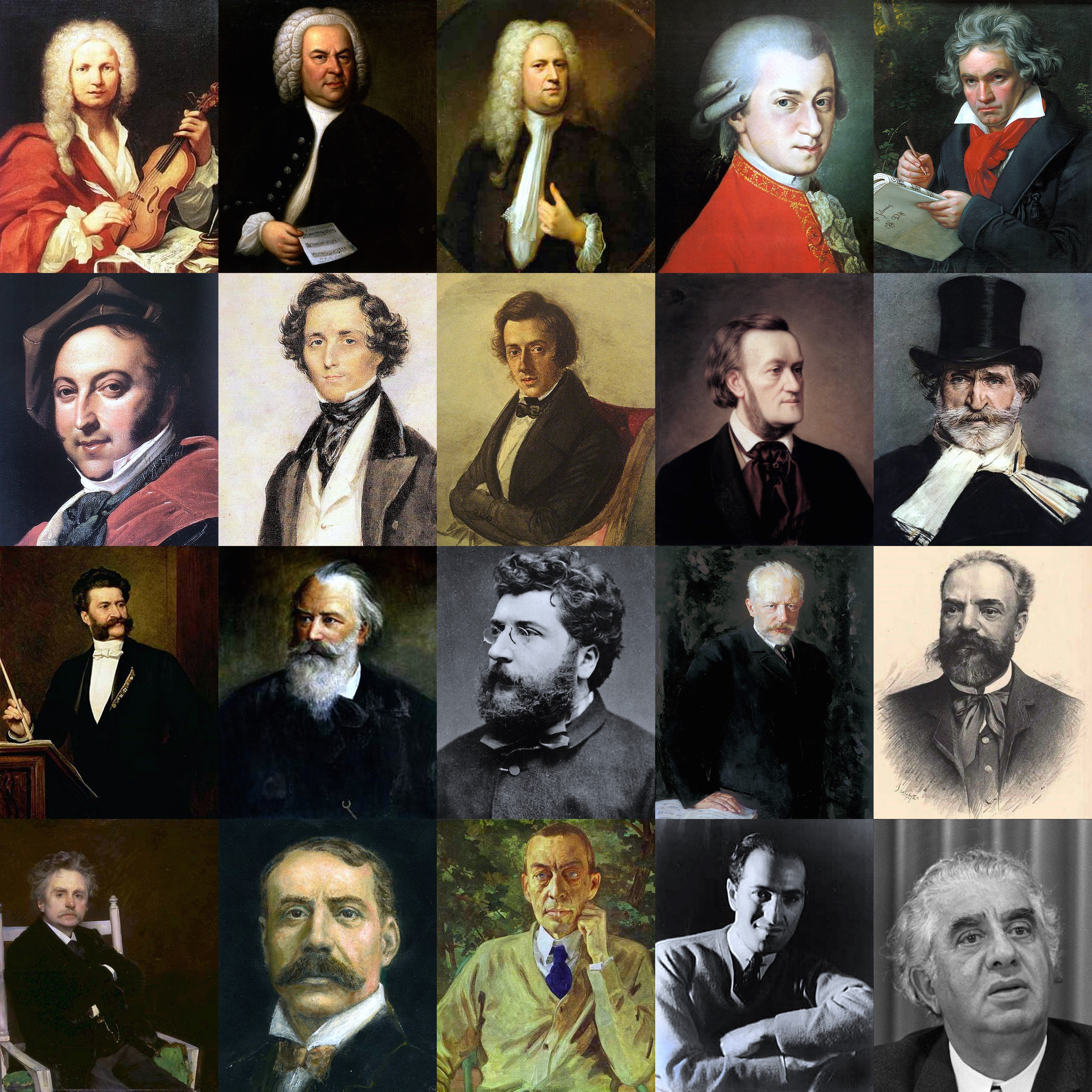
Montage of many notable classical composers

This is a list of classical music composers by era. With the exception of the overview, the Modernist era has been combined with the Postmodern. Composers with a career spanning across more than one time period are colored in between their two respective eras.

== Medieval era ==
See List of Medieval composers and Medieval music.

== Renaissance era ==
See List of Renaissance composers and Renaissance music.

== Baroque era ==
See List of Baroque composers and Baroque music.

== Classical era ==
See List of Classical era composers and Classical period (music).

== Romantic era ==
See List of Romantic-era composers and Romantic music.

== 20th century/contemporary/modern/postmodern ==
See List of 20th-century classical composers and 20th-century classical music.

== See also ==
- History of music
- List of composers by name
- Lists of composers
- List of burial places of classical musicians
- Women in Music
- List of best-selling sheet music
