= Dates of classical music eras =

Music historians divide the Western classical music repertory into various eras based on what style was most popular as taste changed. These eras and styles include Medieval, Renaissance, Baroque, Classical, Romantic, Modernist, and Postmodernist. The 20th and 21st centuries are not musical eras in themselves, but are calendar periods that do not relate individually to musical history. However, these two calendar centuries can be combined into a longer musical period that includes the Modernist and Postmodernist eras. Some of the terms, such as "Renaissance" and "Baroque", are borrowed from Western art history. Approximate dates can be assigned to the beginning and ending of each of these eras, which can be useful in describing changes in taste and to estimate the style of a work composed in a particular year. However, these dates are approximate and even good approximations are hard to make.

== Problems inherent in assigning date ranges ==
Picking particular years for the beginning and end points of eras in European classical music is difficult for several reasons. First, these eras began and ended at different times in different locations. Second, works of particular styles can be found that were composed after the style was no longer popular or important. Third, the styles themselves overlap and absolute categorization is not possible in all cases. For example, a "late Renaissance" piece would likely be very similar to an "early Baroque" piece.

Date ranges of classical music eras are therefore somewhat arbitrary, and are only intended as approximate guides. Scholars of music history do not agree on the start and end dates, and in many cases disagree whether particular years should be chosen at all. The 20th century has exact dates, but is strictly a calendar based unit of time. The Modernist era is confined mostly to the 20th century, but the Postmodern era continues into the current century which is therefore not a separate musical era in its own right.

== Graphical representation of commonly accepted dates ==
The following graph depicts commonly accepted dates for major eras in classical music.

Not shown on the chart:

- Prehistoric music encompasses that music which existed prior to any historical record.
- Ancient music extended from approximately 1500 BCE until the fall of Rome in 476 CE.
- Modernist, and Postmodernist music have been tacitly combined under the 20th century banner as defined by the calendar. However postmodernist music constitutes a separate era from the modernist, and extends into the 21st century which is musically a continuation of the 20th.

== See also ==
- Concert program
- History of music
- List of classical music composers by era
