= Henry Compton (bishop) =

English clergyman (c. 1632–1713)

The Right Reverend and Right Honourable Henry Compton
- Bishop of London
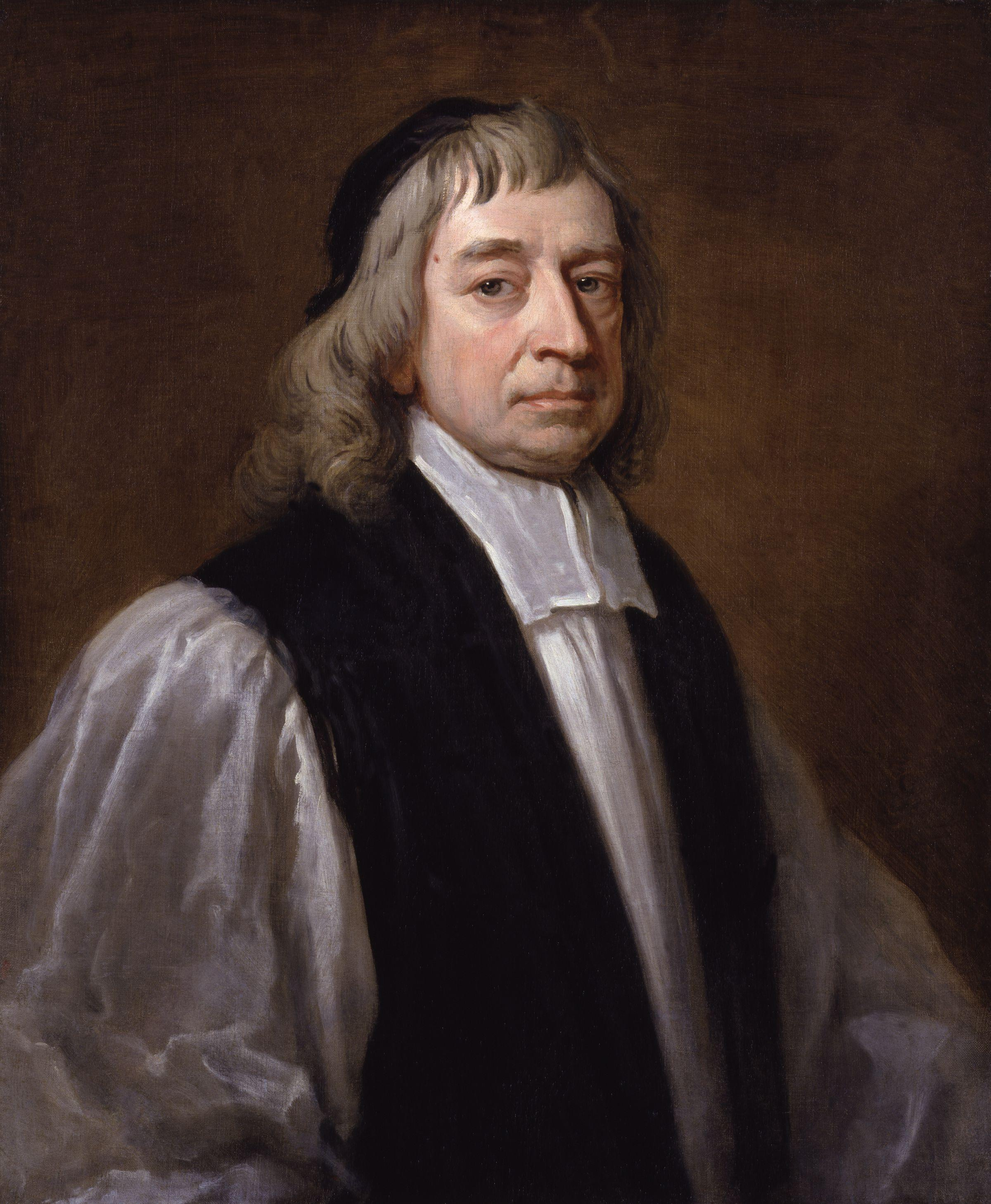
- Portrait of Henry Compton by Godfrey Kneller (1712)
- Church: Church of England
- Diocese: Diocese of London
- Appointed: 6 December 1675
- In office: 1675–1713
- Predecessor: Humphrey Henchman
- Successor: John Robinson
- Previous post: Bishop of Oxford (1674–1675)

Orders
- Consecration: 6 December 1674 by Gilbert Sheldon

Personal details
- Born: 1632 Compton Wynyates, Warwickshire, England
- Died: 7 July 1713 (aged 80–81) Fulham, London, England
- Buried: All Saints Church, Fulham
- Denomination: Anglican
- Parents: Spencer Compton, 2nd Earl of Northampton; Mary Compton (née Beaumont)
- Profession: Army officer, Anglican clergyman
- Education: The Queen's College, Oxford

Arms of Compton: Sable, a lion passant guardant or between three esquire's helmets argent

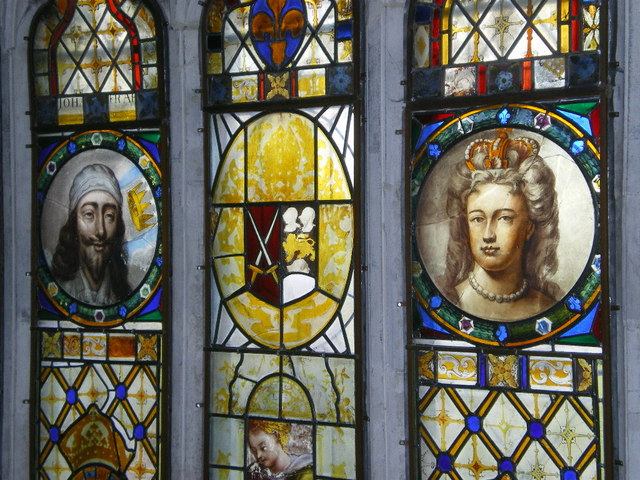
Arms of Henry Compton (See of London impaling Compton) between portraits of executed King Charles I (with falling crown) and his successor Queen Mary II. St Mary's Church, Harlow, Essex

Henry Compton (c. 1632 – 7 July 1713) was an Anglican clergyman who served as the Bishop of London from 1675 to 1713.

== Early life ==
Compton was born the sixth and youngest son of the 2nd Earl of Northampton. He was educated at The Queen's College, Oxford, but left in 1654 without a degree, and then travelled in Europe. After the restoration of Charles II in 1660 he became a cornet in his brother Charles's troop of the Royal Regiment of Horse, but soon quit the army for the church. After a further period of study at Cambridge and again at Oxford, he graduated as a D.D. in 1669. He held various livings, including rector of Cottenham, and Witney.

== Episcopal career ==
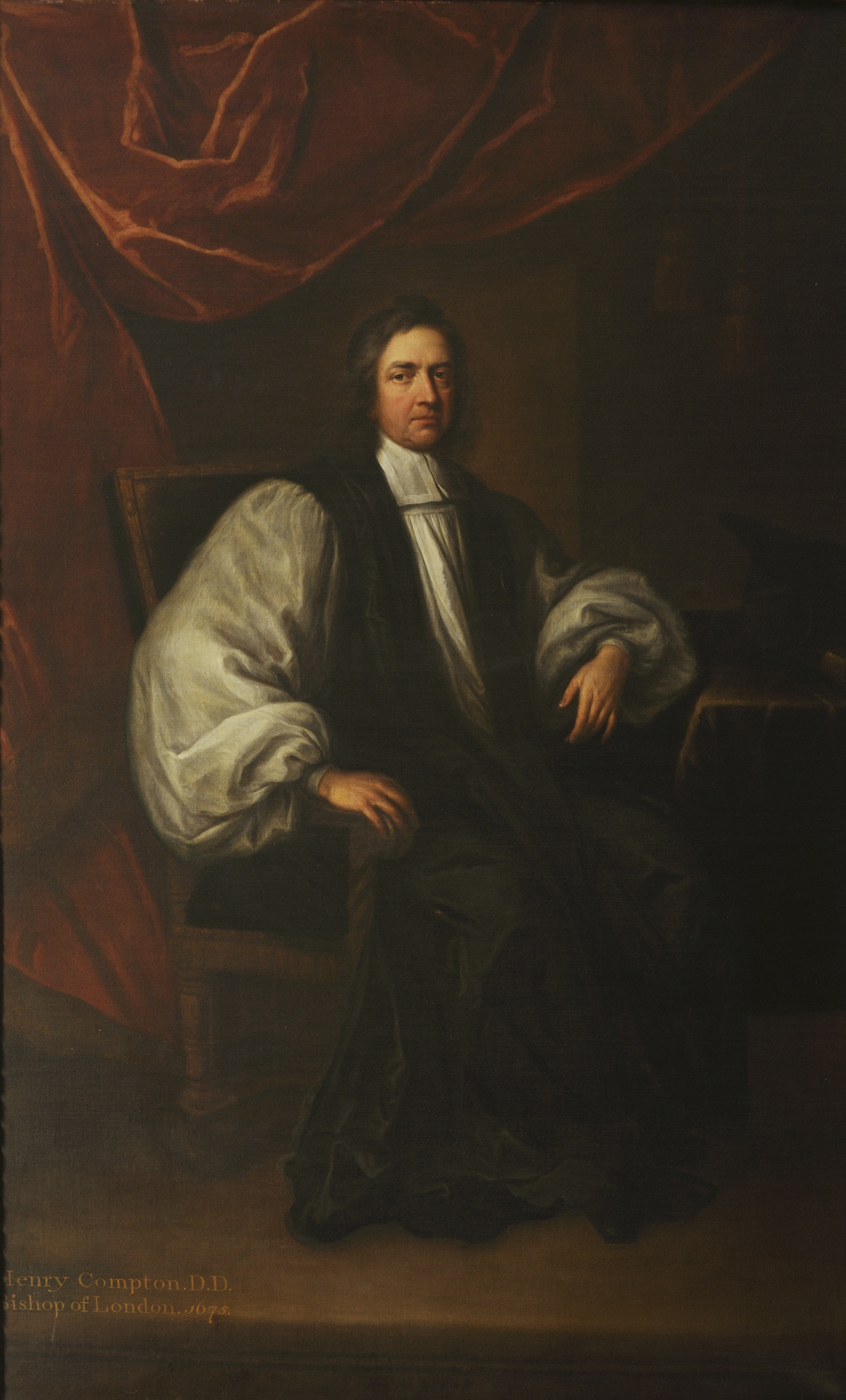
Henry Compton circa 1675

He was made Bishop of Oxford in 1674, and in the following year was translated to the see of London, and also appointed Dean of the Chapel Royal. He was also appointed a member of the Privy Council, and entrusted with the education of the two princesses, Mary and Anne. He showed a liberality most unusual at the time to Protestant dissenters, whom he wished to reunite with the established church. He held several conferences on the subject with the clergy of his diocese; and in the hope of influencing candid minds by means of the opinions of unbiased foreigners, he obtained letters treating of the question (since printed at the end of Edward Stillingfleet's Unreasonableness of Separation) from Le Moyne, professor of divinity at the University of Leiden, and the famous French Protestant divine, Jean Claude.

In 1676 he was instructed by Lord Danby to conduct an ecclesiastical census of the population, which became known as the Compton Census.

In contrast to his liberality about Protestant dissent, Compton was strongly opposed to Roman Catholicism. On the accession of James II in February 1685 he consequently lost his seat in the Council and his position as Dean of the Chapel Royal; and for his firmness in refusing to suspend John Sharp, rector of St Giles's-in-the-Fields, whose anti-papal preaching had rendered him obnoxious to the King, he was himself suspended by James's Ecclesiastical Commission in mid-1686. The suspension was lifted in September 1688, two days before the Commission was abolished.

At the Glorious Revolution Compton embraced the cause of William III and Mary II, being one of the Immortal Seven who invited William to invade England. He performed the ceremony of their coronation as the Archbishop of Canterbury William Sancroft considered himself still bound by his oath of allegiance to James II. Among other appointments, Compton was chosen as one of the commissioners for revising the liturgy. During the reign of Anne he remained a member of the privy council, and was one of the commissioners appointed to arrange the terms of the union of England and Scotland; but, to his bitter disappointment, his claims to the Primatial see of Canterbury were twice passed over. He died at Fulham on 7 July 1713, and was buried at All Saints Church, Fulham.

== Works ==
Compton was a successful botanist. He also published, besides several theological works, A Translation from the Italian of the Life of Donna Olympia Maladichini, who governed the Church during the time of Pope Innocent X, which was from the year 1644 to 1655 (1667), and A Translation from the French of the Jesuits' Intrigues (1669).

Church of England titles
Preceded by The Lord Crew	Bishop of Oxford; 1674–1676	Succeeded by John Fell
Preceded by Humphrey Henchman	Bishop of London; 1675–1713	Succeeded by John Robinson
