= Helene Liebmann =

German pianist and composer

Hélène Liebmann née Riese (16 December 1795 – 2 December 1869) was a German pianist and composer. She was born in Berlin and studied music with Franz Lauska and Ferdinand Ries. A child prodigy, she made her debut before age 13 and published her Piano Sonata when she was 15. She married around 1814 and may have moved with her husband to Vienna and then London. She was present at a Clara Wieck (Schumann) concert in 1835.

== Works ==
Liebmann composed songs, sonatas and piano works. Selected works include:

- Grand Quatuor, Op 13
- Grand Sonata, Op 11 (Grande Sonate pour Pianoforte et Violoncelle)
- Kennst du das Land? Op 3, setting from Goethe's Wilhelm Meister
- Violin Sonata Op 9
