= Christophe Le Menu de Saint-Philbert =

18th-century French music publisher

Christophe Le Menu de Saint Philbert
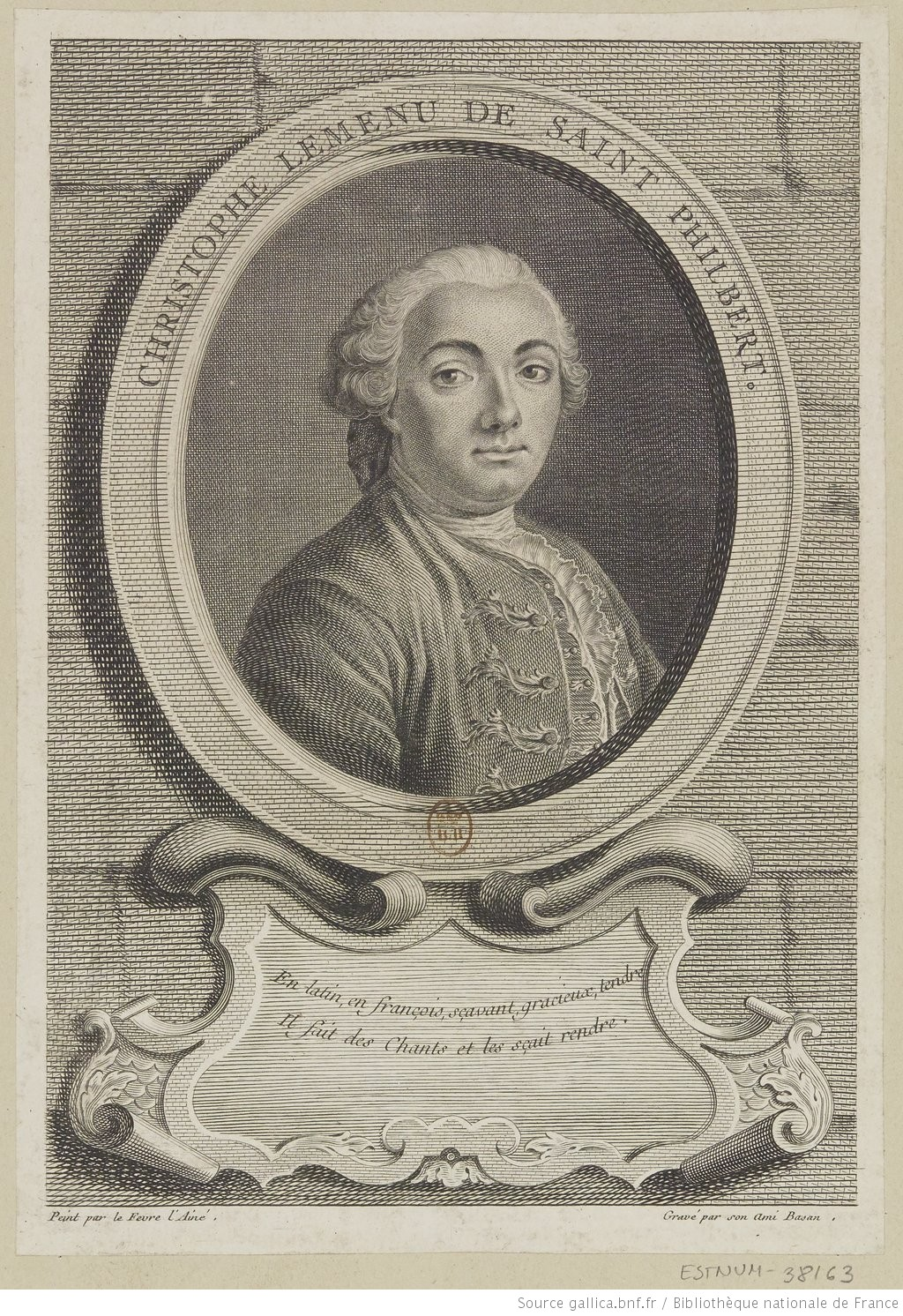
- Born: c. 1720
- Died: 16 September 1774; Paris
- Era: Rococo

Christophe Le Menu de Saint-Philbert (c. 1720 – 1774 in Paris) was a French music publisher who also composed some short cantatas in the rococo style known as cantatilles. His publishing business was established in the 1740s and continued after his death by his widow until 1790. A portrait engraving survives.

== Works, editions and recordings ==
- Premier livre de cantatilles. 6 Cantatilles en simphonie.
- Recording: Mónika González, soprano; Zoltán Megyesi, tenor; Róbert Mandel, hurdy-gurdy; Pál Németh, transverse flute; Piroska Vitárius, violin; Ottó Nagy, cello, viola da gamba; Gábor Tokodi, lute; Ágnes Varallyay, harpsichord 2008, Hungaroton.
