= Madame Ravissa =

Italian composer (mid 18th century – 1807)

Madame Ravissa de Turin (Genovieffa Bernardina Maria Vignola Ravissa de Turin) (mid 18th century – 20 February 1807) was an Italian singer and composer. She was from Turin, but apparently lived in Paris from 1778 until 1783. She published six sonatas for harpsichord in Paris in 1778, where she was described as Maîtresse de Clavecin et de Chant italien. A copy of the sonatas survived in the collection of Kaiser Franz II of Austria. In 1933 the manuscript was discovered in storage at the Steiermärkischer Musikverein by musicologist Ernst Fritz Schmid, and is now housed at the Austrian National Library in Vienna. In 1778 her work was described in the Parisian Almanach as "bold modulations that the Italians love and our timorous composers do not dare to allow themselves".

== Works ==
- Six Sonatas pour le Clavecin, Op. 1, Sonatas I–III by Madame Ravissa de Turin. Edited by Claudia Schweitzer. For harpsichord or period instrument and modern pianos. Furore Verlag. ISBN 979-0-50012-934-9. Sonatas IV–VI. ISBN 979-0-50012-960-8.
