= Sean Senechal =

American cognitive scientist

Sean C. Senechal
- Born: November 4, 1949 (age 76); Damascus, Syria
- Occupations: Physiologist, college instructor, animal language educator

Sean C. Senechal is an American futurist, biologist, physiologist, applied behavior analyst, university bio-psychology instructor, gender/sexuality, biotech educator, and animal language researcher. Senechal's study interests are: 1) Developing domesticated or captive animal expressive communication (to humans), 2) Psycho-biology (including environmental) of gender/sexual diversity, and 3) Future of biotech and medicine.

Senechal uses Positive behavior support (PBS) in Applied Behavior Analysis (ABA) and provides ABA Behavioral and Communication Therapy to children, especially those with autism, Aspergers, and speech delays. Senechal adds this tool (ABA) to existing methods (AnimalSign) to benefit and develop skill in animals, such as dogs, horses, elephants, and cats.

== Education and Work ==
Senechal attended undergraduate programs initially in Physics (theoretical) and Math, but then, after reading the book The Structure of Scientific Revolution, moved into Sociology (of Knowledge) followed by pre-med courses UC Berkeley. Attending California State University in San Francisco in the MA program (in collaboration with the SF Army Presidio) on Biology (Behavior and Physiology), Sean continued graduate Ph.D. work, studying Animal Physiology and Cognition (attention in humans) at UC Davis. Advanced to candidacy and completed research on covert attention in humans. Around this time, Senechal met and fell in love with a yearling horse and developed a deep interest in understanding the horse, directly through the horse communications to horse and people. Senechal began research in evidence-based methods to enable animals to communicate their needs and wants to humans (modeled initially after the techniques used with Koko the Gorilla). In the 2000s the animal communication work expanded to dogs (using a German Shepherd named Chal and a Border Collie named Starlight, and resulted in a Random House book titled Dogs Can Sign, Too. The following book (in process) focuses on the Border Collie (Starlight) who inspired Sean to find a way to help disabled dogs who are both hard of hearing, seeing, and moving communicate too. In the 2020s cats joined the project and a new technique emerged, soon to be documented.

During graduate school and shortly after, Senechal worked in the tech world in Silicon Valley, gaining experience as a Quality Assurance Tester, Manager, then Director in various software companies (startups like Planetweb, to large companies such as Borland, Intuit, and General Magic). After the crash of the industry, Sean participated in the Tech- to- Teach programs and gained a teaching credential in Math/Science, working in middle and high school in California. Expertise was in teaching Algebra as a game, leading the middle school class to beat the high school test scores. Later Sean gained experience teaching students in special education, which led to following the behaviorist track ABA Applied Behavior Analysis and PBS (Positive Behavioral Support) Certification Courses at the California State University, Monterey Bay. This led to further education at Florida Institute of Technology in their rigorous Applied Behavior Analysis program. Sean became board certified as an Applied Behavior Analyst. Sean Senechal practices, consults, and researches using many techniques (ethical ABA, CBT, Mindfulness, ACT, Trauma-Informed care, etc. ), with a special focus on communication in neurodiverse people (ASD, Asperger's) or with challenges or lack of support in cognition/behavior/identity.

Another focus of Sean's interest is in current and future of biotech advances: Regenerative Medicine advances, and the bio psycho social environmental impact on individual and group identities and behaviors. Sean taught university (UCD, CIIS, CSUMB, Carrington) courses in biology, psychology, and human development and sexuality: Human Biology and Behavior, Biological Psychology, Behavior Disorders, Microbiology. With a PhD from CIIS Program in Profession Psychology and Health, Dr. Senechal researched the accuracy of models of gender. After 2023 the independent scholar began research on the impact of all types (innate, medicines, herbs, innate, disruptors, and facilitators) of chemicals on sex, sexuality, and gender throughout the lifespan, with an evolutionary lens.

== Career ==
Software QA Engineer: Senechal's career while in graduate school was as a software tech professional (Quality Assurance for software). Sean started as a tester, manager, then director of software testing in Silicon Valley.

Animal Communication: Sean Senechal's major contribution (so far) has been to approach domestic and captive animals as expressive language learners. Sean has attempted to teach zoo and domestic animals additional methods of expressive communication using gestures, signs, and cards. The focus is on exploring, studying, and teaching these animals the productive-expressive language, but also includes expanded cognitive and receptive language skill development. The method applies multiple techniques, some empathetic, some formal and similar to Applied Behavior Analysis Functional Communication Training used with children has been limited but productive. These animals include dogs, horses, cats, and elephants. While many studies have focused on non-human primate language development using lexigrams and sign language, Senechal focuses on promoting expressive (contrived and structured) language development in the animals.

=== AnimalSign study ===
Senechal founded the AnimalSign Center, a language research center and school for non-primate animals. Sean created the AnimalSign Language used to research and teach animals a new, structured, and gestural language, inspired by the sophisticated language ASL. Using this with dogs and horses since 2004 and 2000 respectively, with encouraging results to the animals and people. The book 'Dogs Can Sign, Too. A breakthrough method for teaching your dog to communicate to you' was published by a Random House division. In 2013 the Monterey Zoo in California provided a few hours for working with the African elephants. The horse book was due out by Storey Press, who due to the economy (supposedly) decided to hold off. The self-published book is due out in 2015. Several other books will follow.

AnimalSign Language is the umbrella method for teaching communication (productive and receptive) through gestures, like simplified ASL, Picture Exchange Communication System, PECS, tapping, and vocalization.

Sean holds AnimalSign Language education classes, workshops, and seminars for human and animal students at the AnimalSign Center, and online courses will be upcoming in 2015. The next project (with crowdfunding) to start in 2015 involves raising multiple Border collie dogs with and without signing, while tracking their neuroanatomy, behavior, and communication skills for their lifetime. First life tracking study of the dog brain, and first to teach and track the impact of language training.

=== Other ===
Academics: During and after graduate school, Sean taught Cell Biology, Anatomy, Physiology, Biology, and related college/university courses. Sean teaches university courses in biology, psychology, and human development: Human Biology and Behavior, Biological Psychology, Developmental Psychology, Behavior Disorders, Microbiology. Future Technology of Medicine is next, incorporating interests in biotech and making it more accessible and affordable. Another focus of Sean's interest is in current and future of biotech advances: Regenerative Medicine advances, and the biological and psychological impact on individuals and society.

Sexuality/ Gender Studies: In 2013, Sean's interest expanded to studying the growing gender and sexual diversity (especially in youth), its history (especially the transgender bisexual/gay male), impact on individuals, and the psycho- and sociobiological influences. The project (book) is on the Biological Basis and Markers of Sexual and Gender Diversity. The most recent growing phenomenon 'GenderQueer', especially in youth, is of special interest. Is this growing due to biological-environmental, and/or social influences? At the Santa Cruz Diversity Center, Senechal facilitates a GenderQueer support group.

Senechal's interest has expanded to teaching and studying the biological basis and markers of gender diversity, especially in the student populations which have become increasingly diverse. This interest expands into the bio/medical/genetic and imaging technology contributing to the understanding and development of timely psychological and biological treatments for gender/sexuality issues.

Behaviorist: Sean became board certified as an Applied Behavior Analyst. Sean Senechal practices, consults, and researches using many techniques (one being ABA), with a special focus on communication (in humans and animals), ASD and Asperger's, behavior challenges, and gender/sexuality.

Sean has also been consulting as an ABA professional for behavior programs for children, adolescents, adults with autism. Senechal has a private practice (as Coach and ABA professional) working with those with Asperger's, Behavior, and (as Coach) Sexual/Gender issues in Santa Cruz/Monterey area.

== Works ==
Sean's first work was featured in a Canadian canine magazine CANIS FAMILIARIS in 2008-9 and was shown in conventions such as the Canadian Association of Professional Pet Dog Trainers. Sean's book AnimalSign To You in 2006, and Dog's Can Sign, Too. in 2009, and e-book 2013 were also published by Random House.

The equivalent horse book is expected out in 2015 through Amazon publishing.

Senechal's book was reviewed and her studies were described for the blind dogs and deaf dogs owners' communities at Deaf Dogs Forever website.

Sean's work with elephants was presented at the Animal Behavior Society Convention in 2012.
