= Leopold Koželuch =

Czech composer (1747–1818)

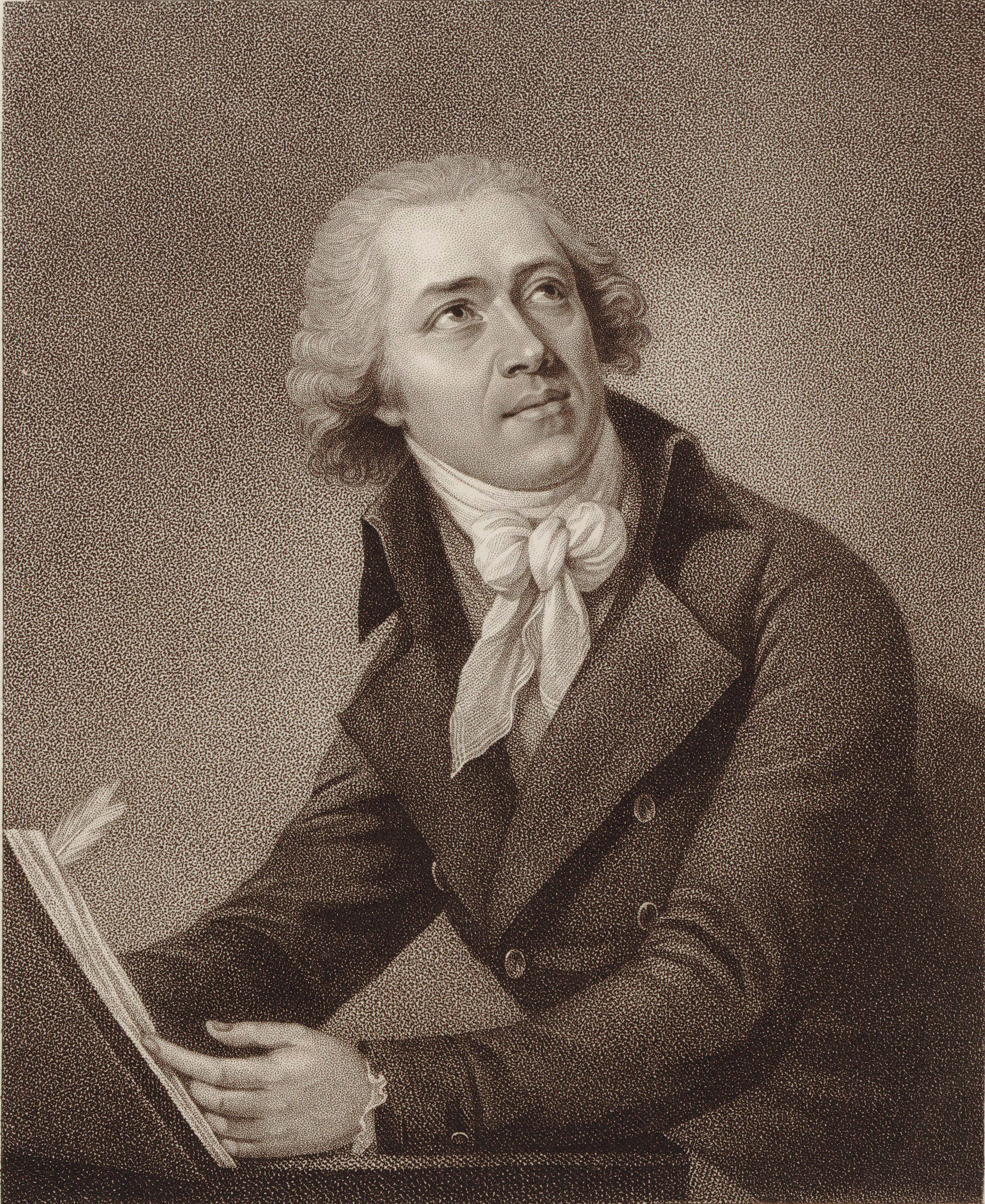
- Born: Jan Antonín Koželuh; 26 June 1747; Velvary, Bohemia, Habsburg monarchy
- Died: 7 May 1818 (aged 70); Vienna, Austrian Empire
- Occupation: Composer

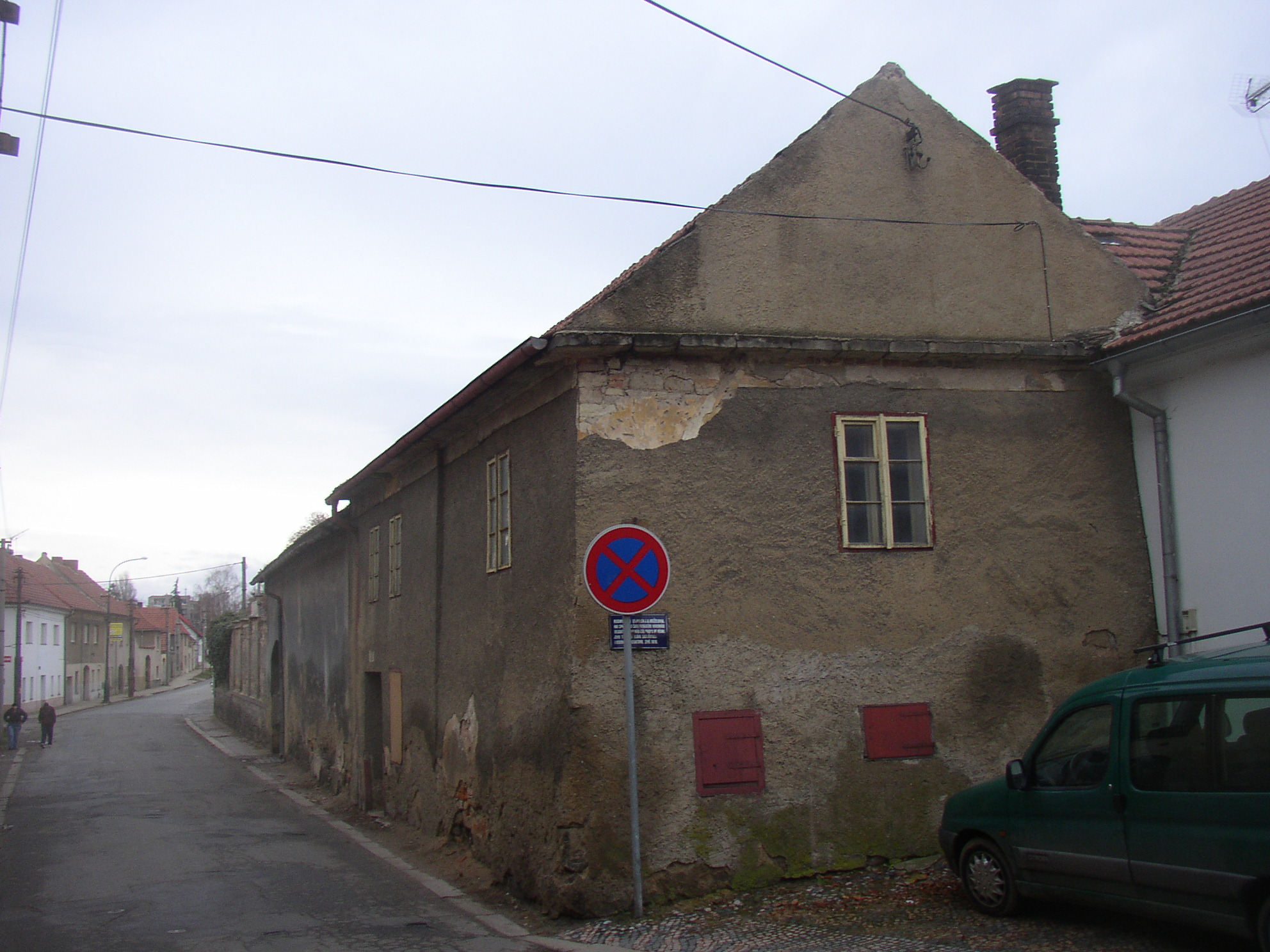
Birth house of Leopold Koželuch in Velvary

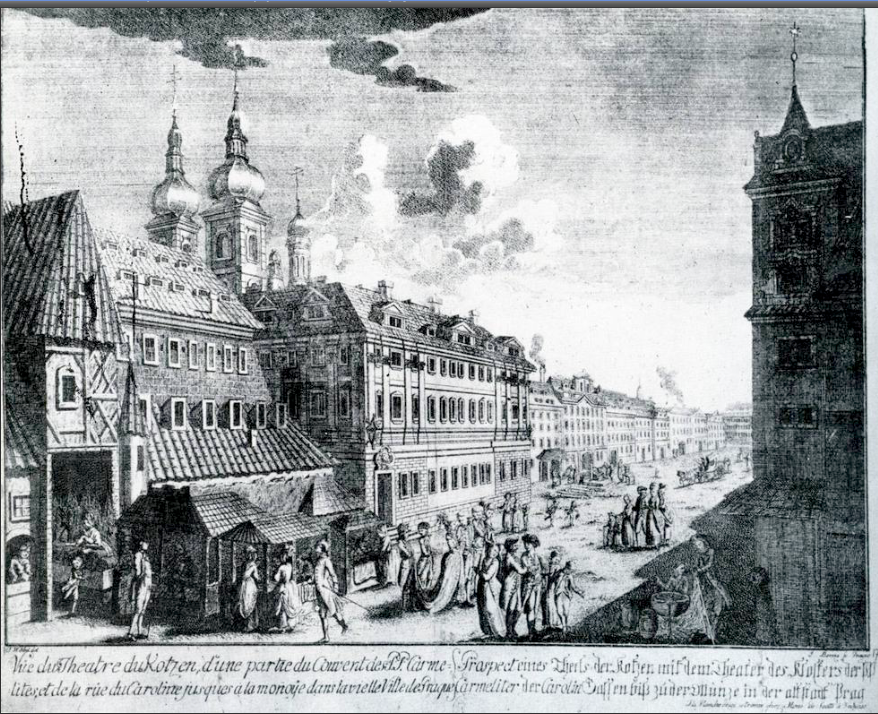
Prague – Kotzen Theatre

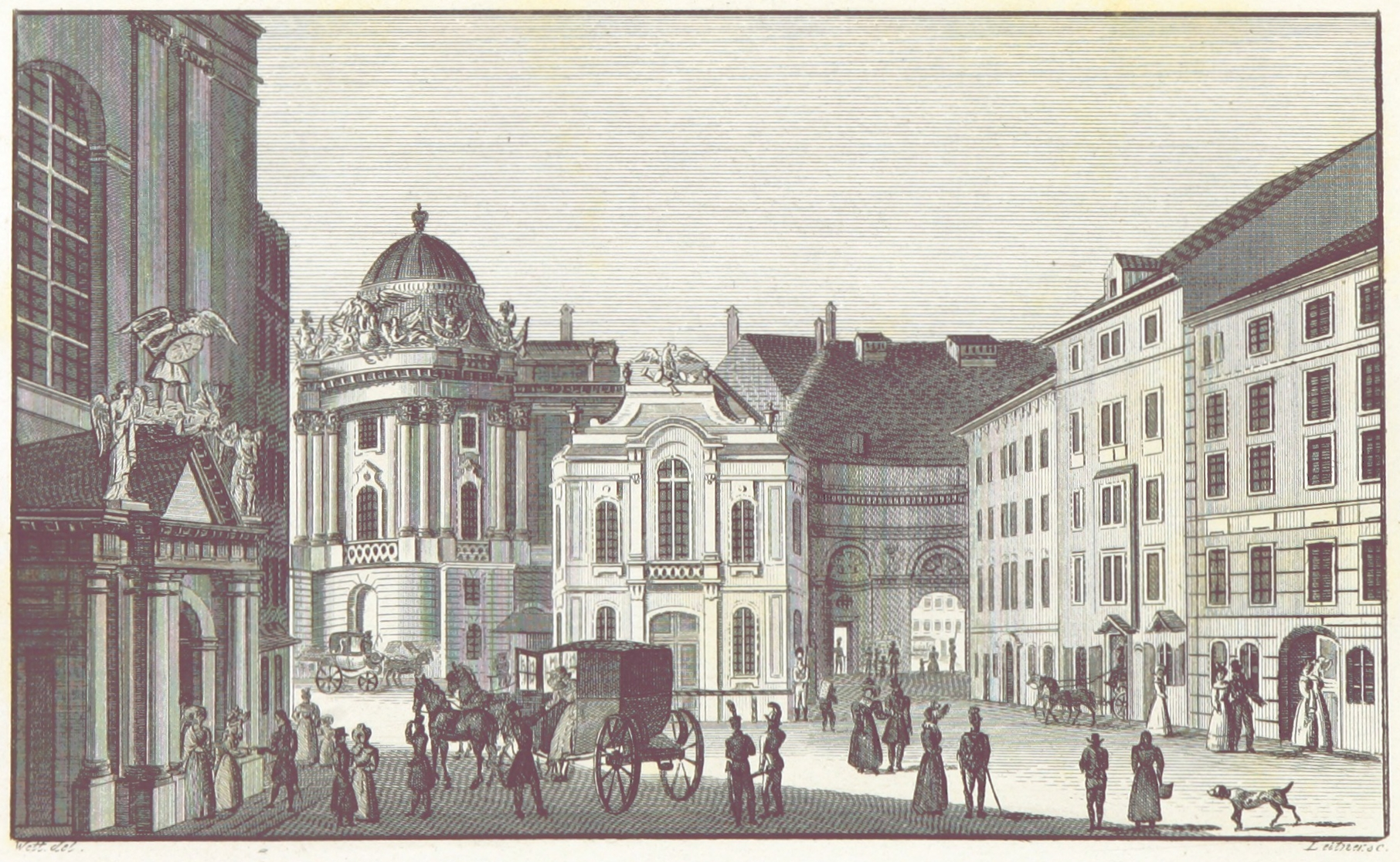
Vienna – Burgtheater Michaelerplatz

Leopold Koželuch (Czech pronunciation: [ˈlɛopolt ˈkoʒɛlux], born Jan Antonín Koželuh, alternatively also Leopold Koželuh, Leopold Kotzeluch; 26 June 1747 – 7 May 1818) was a Czech composer and music teacher.

He was born in Velvary and moved to Prague to further his musical education, before moving again to Vienna in 1778, where he was based for the remainder of his career. In Vienna he achieved renown as a composer, pianist and teacher, and from 1792 until his death in 1818 he held royal appointments as Kammer Kapellmeister (music director) and Hofmusik Compositor (composer), as Wolfgang Amadeus Mozart's successor.

Koželuch's compositional output included sonatas and concertos for keyboard, the instrument in which he specialised, as well as chamber music, choral music and opera.

== Life ==
Koželuch was born on 26 June 1747 in Velvary, Bohemia, Habsburg monarchy (present-day Czech Republic). His father was Antonín Bartholomäus Koželuh, a shoemaker. He was baptised Jan Antonín, but by 1773 he had adopted the name Leopold to avoid confusion with his elder cousin, the composer Jan Antonín Koželuh. He also Germanised his surname to Koželuch. After starting his musical education in Velvary, Koželuch moved to Prague where he studied with his cousin and František Xaver Dušek, the latter teaching him in the keyboard and composition.

From 1771 to 1778, Koželuch wrote ballets and pantomimes which were performed in Prague. The success of these works led him to abandon plans to study law in favour of a musical career. He moved to Vienna for this purpose in 1778, where he quickly established himself as a pianist, albeit one who did not perform in public, composer and teacher. Pianist Kemp English observes that in Vienna Koželuch "found himself in the right place at the right time", and was able to advance his career there with carefully cultivated connections. He composed a cantata for the death of Maria Theresa in 1780. His pupils would include Maria Theresia Paradis, Archduchess Elisabeth of Württemberg, Archduchess Marie Louise and Maria Leopoldine von Österreich, Empress of Brazil. His appointment to teach Archduchess Elizabeth was an official court position, succeeding Georg Christoph Wagenseil. In 1781, Wolfgang Amadeus Mozart resigned his appointment as court organist in Salzburg following a quarrel with his employer, the Archbishop of Salzburg. The Archbishop offered the position to Koželuch, but Koželuch refused, later expressing concerns to a friend that he might too have fallen victim to what he saw as Mozart's ill-treatment. In 1784, Koželuch expanded into publishing, and soon formed his own firm, Musikalisches Magazin, which would later come under the management of his brother Antonín Tomáš. Koželuch would use the firm, in combination with overseas partners, to publish many of his compositions.

By 1790, a time at which Mozart and Joseph Haydn were at the height of their careers, Koželuch's reputation was such as to move Ernst Ludwig Gerber to say the following of his status within Europe: "Leopold Kozeluch is without question with young and old the generally most loved among our living composers, and this with justification". Koželuch's esteem in royal circles grew again in 1791, when he composed a well-received cantata commissioned for the coronation of Emperor Leopold II in Prague. Mozart composed La clemenza di Tito for the same occasion. Mozart's death later in the year afforded Koželuch another opportunity: Emperor Franz II offered him Mozart's positions in his court, Kammer Kapellmeister (music director) and Hofmusik Compositor (composer), and at double Mozart's salary. Koželuch would remain in the positions until his death. Koželuch joined a masonic lodge in 1791, marking another coincidence between his career and Mozart's and serving to advance himself further within Viennese society.

Koželuch's compositional output declined after the turn of the century as he focused on his court duties, teaching, and the lucrative work of arranging Scottish, Irish and Welsh folk songs for the publisher George Thomson. William Crotch reflected on Koželuch's reputation in a lecture in 1806, remarking that he had "sunk in unmerited neglect" while Mozart's reputation had enjoyed posthumous growth. In 1809, Ludwig van Beethoven, a frequent disparager of rival composers, would write to Thomson referring to Koželuch as "Miserabilis".

Koželuch died on 7 May 1818. His daughter, Catherina Cibbini-Kozeluch, became a prominent pianist and composer based in Vienna.

== Works ==
Koželuch left around 400 compositions. Among these there are about thirty symphonies, twenty-two piano concertos, including a concerto for piano four-hands, arguably one of the best examples of this rare genre, two clarinet concertos, twenty-four violin sonatas, sixty-three piano trios, six string quartets, two oratorios (one of which, Moisè in Egitto, has recently been produced and recorded), nine cantatas and various liturgical works. Among his music there are also operas and works for ballet, which—with the exception of one opera —have yet to be heard in recent years. Numerous arrangements by him of Scottish songs for the Edinburgh collector George Thomson were popular, and some of these have also been recorded.

Milan Poštolka, a musicologist, catalogued Koželuch's works in 1964.

=== Keyboard ===
Koželuch's substantial output of keyboard compositions reflected the promotion of his reputation as a specialist keyboard virtuoso. Christopher Hogwood argues that Koželuch's keyboard sonatas, especially those which open in minor keys, "substantially anticipated ... the tragic-pathetic manner" of Beethoven and Schubert, and that in them he "created the internationally praised cantabile idiom". Hogwood further states that "Koželuch's sonatas are, in the true sense, 'classics'—that is to say, 'models for imitation and study'—and display to perfection precisely those features that theorists required of a sonata at the end of the 18th century." The oeuvre of sonatas spans almost the entirety of Koželuch's career: the first was composed in 1773; the final three date from after 1810. The sonatas cater for different purposes. Some are exhibitionist works; some are simpler; some are cast in a Romantic style that foreshadows Beethoven. In the third category, Koželuch was composing slow minor-key introductions to sonatas as much as 17 years before Beethoven composed his Piano Sonata No. 8 ("Pathetique"), while neither Mozart nor Haydn ever did so. Koželuch's composed his sonatas to be played on the newly emerging fortepiano rather than the harpsichord. The popularity of the sonatas in turn helped to make the fortepiano fashionable.

Twenty-two Koželuch keyboard concertos survive. The musicologist Richard Wigmore argues that they "conspicuously lack the melodic abundance, rich woodwind colouring and operatic-style dialogues of Mozart's great Viennese concertos", but nonetheless "beguile with their limpid grace, their sparkling keyboard writing (often in just two parts), and their sense of proportion." Most are scored only for strings, oboes, horns and soloist—sparser than Mozart's scoring of his contemporaneous concertos—suggesting that the works were intended for small-scale performances.

=== Chamber ===
Koželuch's chamber music, especially his output from the 1790s, is among the more advanced of his works, often foreshadowing the expressionism of Beethoven. Musicologist Roger Hickman refers to this period of chamber music output as representing a more "daring character" on the part of the composer, and argues that these works "must have been noted by the young Schubert". Koželuch's only string quartets date from this period. A set of six published as Opus 32 and Opus 33, they became known throughout Europe.

=== Orchestral and choral ===
Koželuch probably composed most of his symphonies during his first decade in Vienna, a period in which his Viennese contemporaries, including Mozart, were focusing on other genres. The musicologist Allan Badley labels Koželuch's symphonic compositions as "modest by the standards of the time". Badley argues that Koželuch's symphonies are influenced by those of his Prague teacher František Xaver Dušek in their orchestration and thematic organisation.

Almost all of Koželuch's choral works, including cantatas and five of his six operas, have been lost. His opera Gustav Wasa (presumably from 1792) was performed in Finland in 2018, for the first time since the death of the composer.
