= Miss Davis =

Miss Davis (c. 1726 – after 1755) was an Irish singer, musician and composer, born in Dublin, Ireland. Her father was a harpsichord player, and her mother was a singer who promoted her daughter as a child prodigy. Miss Davis had her debut in London on 10 May 1745. She later wrote and performed her own songs, none of which survive.

In 1755 the Dublin Journal published a notice that Miss Davis had retired from playing in public, but continued to teach ladies. She is thought to have died in Dublin.
