= Friedrich Erhard Niedt =

German composer and music theorist

Friedrich Erhard Niedt (31 May 1674 – 1717) was a German jurist, music theorist, and composer.

Niedt was born in Jena, and enrolled at the University of Jena in 1694, where he is thought to have studied law. Around 1700, he moved to Copenhagen, staying in Hamburg along the way. He died in Copenhagen.

The first part of his Musical Guide might be a record of musical techniques similar to what Johann Sebastian Bach used.

== Works in music theory ==
=== The Musical Guide, 1700-1710 ===
Niedt's Musical Guide consists of three parts, each of which are concerned with figured bass. In the first part, Niedt discusses the basics of figured bass, and gives the following definition:

'The thorough-bass is the most complete foundation of music. It is played with both hands on a keyboard instrument in such a way that the left hand plays the prescribed notes, while the right hand strikes consonances and dissonances, so that this results in a well sounding Harmony for the Honor of God and the permissible delight of the soul.' In this description I call the playing of the thorough-bass the most complete foundation, in contrast to the other basses which are played on a Violin[-Bass], bassoon, and similar instruments, which, it is true, are also a fundamental voice but not as complete as the thorough-bass, because these instruments play only one tone at a time.

Niedt's suggestion that figured bass is "the most complete foundation of music" might be misinterpreted if it is read out of context, for later in this same quote, he clarifies that by "complete" he simply means that the keyboard can play many notes at once, whereas other instruments are limited to one note at a time.

The second part of the Musical Guide describes how variation may be introduced in figured bass. Many examples are presented that demonstrate how simple musical materials may be made more complex. Niedt justifies devoting an entire part of his book to variation because, he says, "variety in things or ideas ... is to no creature so pleasing and delightful as to the senses and sensibilities of the human soul." In addition to variation, the second part of the Musical Guide also contains a specialized dictionary that defines musical terms, as well as a descriptive list of the specifications of 63 important organs found in various places across northern and central Europe including Sendomir, or today Sandomierz Poland.

The third part of the Musical Guide is incomplete, since Niedt died before finishing it. Nonetheless, a substantial portion of the third section was published, which begins by describing counterpoint, and later branches off into other traditionally serious areas of music, such as canon. Niedt is consistently hostile towards what he perceives to be musically pretentious. For example, he has this to say about the sometimes arcane concept of musical mode:

By rights I should now continue and, according to the older tradition, first explain the ancient Greek keys or modes and their properties, which are to be played sadly or merrily, etc. I should also recite them with their old imposing names, such as Dorian, Hypodorian, etc. Such scribbling is impossible for me. I break out in a cold sweat at the mere thought of these follies and I would certainly have to purge myself from both directions if I spoke or wrote much about this matter.

Regarding counterpoint, Niedt calls it the musical equivalent of "spelling," and suggests that counterpoint arises from the realization of figured bass. Niedt insists that "mere counterpoint contains no beauty" and that one can "discern no complete meaning or context" from it. As opposed to pedagogues who developed rules for composing counterpoint on its own terms (such as Johann Fux), Niedt attempts instead to extend his figured bass instruction to encompass the subject of counterpoint.

== Music ==
- 6 Suites for Oboe and Basso Continuo

== Writings ==
- The Musical Guide: First Part (Musicalische Handleitung) (1700, 1710)
- Guide to Variation: The Musical Guide: Second Part (Handleitung zur Variation) (Hamburg 1706, 1721)
- Musical Guide: Third and Last Part (Musicalische Handleitung dritter und letzter Theil) (published by Johann Mattheson, 1717)
- Musicalisches ABC zum Nutzen der Lehr- und Lernenden (Hamburg, 1708)
