= Catherina Cibbini-Kozeluch =

Austrian pianist and composer

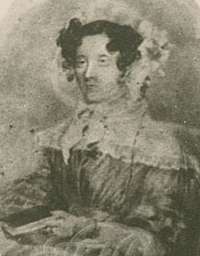
Catherine Cibbini-Koželuch

Catherina Maria Leopoldina Cibbini-Kozeluch (Katerina Koželuh; 20 February 1785 – 12 August 1858) was a pianist and composer in the Austrian Empire of Bohemian ancestry. She was born in Vienna, the daughter of prominent composer, pianist and music publisher Leopold Kozeluch. She studied music with her father and also with Muzio Clementi.

She married Anton Cibbini, and held the court office of first lady's maid to the Empress Karolina Augusta. Cibbini-Kozeluch died in Zákupy, near Česká Lípa.

== Works ==
Selected works include:

- Introduction et variations brillantes pour le piano-forte, op.2
- Divertissements brillants, op.3
- Introduction and Variations in Eb, op.5
- Six waltzes pour piano-forte, op. 6
- Introduction and Polonaise, op. 8
- La ribembranza, op. 10
- Grand trio concertante sur des motifs favoris pour deux pianos et violoncelle
