= Gertrude van den Bergh =

Dutch pianist and composer

Gertrude van den Bergh (c. 21 January 1793 – 10 September 1840) was a Dutch pianist and composer.

== Early years ==
Gertrude van den Bergh was baptized in Cologne, the eldest daughter of Dutch father Henderik van den Bergh and German Maria Theresia Leydel. Van den Bergh showed talent for music at an early age, took piano lessons at six and published a harpsichord sonata at the age of nine. She studied composition with Friedrich August Burgmüller and piano with Ferdinand Ries.

== Career ==
In 1809 van den Bergh's father organized a concert tour of the Netherlands for Gertrude and her sister Sophia. The family moved to The Hague about 1813, and afterward Van den Bergh seldom played in public. She continued to perform in private circles and remained well known. In 1830 she was invited to join the Society for the Promotion of Music, which had not been previously open to women. In 1834 the society held a two-day festival in The Hague where Van den Bergh participated. She directed the first mixed voice choir from The Hague and from 1837 or 1838 the Vocal Society.

As an unmarried woman, Van den Bergh lived with her mother and gave singing and piano lessons. She wrote a music instruction manual around 1830 to aid in this work, and in 1840 she died in The Hague of breast cancer at the age of 47.

== Works ==
Most of Van den Bergh's compositions were unpublished and so lost. Selected works include:

- Lied für Piano-Forte
- Rondeau pour le piano forte, op. 3
