= Sophia Maria Westenholz =

German composer, musician, singer and music educator

Sophia Maria Westenholz (née Elenore Sophia Maria Fritscher; 10 July 1759 - 4 October 1838) was a German composer, musician, singer and music educator. Born in Neubrandenburg, she was raised in a privileged family and spent most of her life in the courts of Schwerin and Ludwigslust, capitals of the Duchy of Mecklenburg-Schwerin. At the behest of Duke Ludwig, she studied piano and singing with Konzertmeister Johann Wilhelm Hertel in Schwerin beginning at age ten. By the time she was sixteen, she was employed as a singer in the Mecklenburg-Schwerin court chapel at Ludwigslust. She became the second wife of the Kapellmeister Carl August Friedrich Westenholz in the summer of 1777; they had eight children together.

By the 1780s, Westenholz received great acclaim in Berlin, Leipzig, Ludwigslust and Rostock, amassing a following including composer Ernst Wilhelm Wolf and Carl Friedrich Cramer. Wolf is quoted as saying “Mrs. Westenholz's manner is that of the great Bach in Hamburg.” In a review of his six sonatas, which Wolf had dedicated to Sophie Westenholz, Cramer also praised the balance in the musical expression of her playing.

When Carl Westenholz died in 1789, Sophia received the title of Kapellmeisterin at Ludwigslust. Following his death, she continued her career as a singer, teacher and pianist. She taught music to the Ludwigslust princesses and composed and performed her own works at court. In addition to her reputation as a pianist, she also became known for performing as a glass harmonica player in various concerts. After 1800, she began focusing on cultivating compositions, with several of her works appearing in print by 1806. She was described by Johann Friedrich Reichardt as being 'one of the leading musicians of Europe’.

She retired in 1821 having secured a pension, and continued to serve as a court singer until her death.

== Works ==
Westenholz drew inspiration from the works of Johann Abraham Peter Schulz and Johann Friedrich Reichardt and wrote songs in both strophic and folk-song style.

Her works include:

Lieder with Unadorned Melodies:

- Das Grab
- Die Erscheinung
- Frühlingsreigen
- Meine Wünsche

Lieder With Ornamented Melodies:

- Das Glücke der Liebe
- Huldigung
- Lied der Liebe

Lieder That Represent the Early Romantic Style:

- Morgenlied
- Weine nicht, es ist vergebens
- Trost der Hoffnung
- Der Bund
