= Franz Lauska =

Moravian pianist, composer and teacher of Giacomo Meyerbeer

Franz Seraphin Lauska (13 January 1764 – 18 April 1825), baptised as Franciscus Ignatius Joannes Nepomucensis Carolus Boromaeus, was a Moravian pianist, composer, and teacher of Giacomo Meyerbeer and Felix Mendelssohn . The name "Seraphin" was a later name affix, which Lauska never used. Lauska was considered "one of the most brilliant executants of his time."

== Biography ==
Lauska was born in Brno, and may have been a student of Johann Georg Albrechtsberger while studying in Vienna in 1784. He also spent time in Italy, played chamber music while serving at the Bavarian court in Munich, taught in Copenhagen from 1794 to 1798, and then moved to Berlin. There he performed as a pianist, wrote music, and was a piano teacher of the Prussian royal family and the young Giacomo Meyerbeer. He conducted the Sing-Akademie zu Berlin in rehearsals while Carl Friedrich Zelter was away in 1802 and later became a member of Zelter's Liedertafel. Lauska probably knew Beethoven, for whom he read proofs, and was friends with Carl Maria von Weber, who dedicated his second sonata in A-flat major to Lauska. Around 1816 he gave piano lessons to Felix and Fanny Mendelssohn. He died in Berlin, aged 61.

== Works ==
Lauska wrote a great deal of piano music (approximately 25 sonatas, rondos, variations, polonaises, capriccios, etc.), much of it technically undemanding and intended for beginners, amateurs, and his pupils. His music is uncomplicated and typical of the musical style at the time. The following list of works is incomplete. A complete, dated catalogue of works has been published recently.

- Piano music:
  - Grande Sonate, Op. 1, for harpsichord or piano (Hamburg, ca. 1795) OCLC 497820429, 165292651
  - Menuette varié, for piano, on a theme from Sonata, op. 1 (Copenhagen, no date) OCLC 165292653, 474081654
  - Grande Sonate, Op. 4, for harpsichord or piano (Hamburg, ca. 1797) OCLC 300130484, 658645635
  - Eine grosse Sonate für's Pianoforte, Op. 6 (Hamburg, 1797) OCLC 254804106, 658645649, 478681395, 165292654 OCLC 165292654
  - Sonata, Op. 7, for piano (Hamburg, 1797) OCLC 658645663
  - Eight variations for piano on the air "Ich küsse dich o Schleier" from Geister Insel by Reichard (Munich, 1799) OCLC 497820508
  - Grande Sonate, Op. 9 (Hamburg, ca. 1800) OCLC 497820468
  - Grande Sonate, Op. 10 (Hamburg, ca. 1800) OCLC 497820474
  - Sonata, Op. 20, for piano (Leipzig, ca. 1812) OCLC 180641536, 122399892, 165292656
  - Polonaise, Op. 23 (Leipzig, ca. 1815) OCLC 315226638
  - Polonoise, Op. 25 (Leipzig, ca. 1809) OCLC 165278132
  - Sonata, Op. 26 (Leipzig, ca. 1810) OCLC 315226921
  - Rondeau and polonaise, Op. 27 (Berlin, ca. 1815) OCLC 632794135
  - Deux grandes polonaises en forme de rondeau, Op. 29 (Berlin, ca. 1812) OCLC 634045589, 315223658, 497820411
  - Capriccio, Op. 32, for piano (Leipzig, ca. 1815) OCLC 180641485, 165292640
  - Grande Sonate, Op. 34 (Berlin, no date) OCLC 165292660
  - Sonata, Op. 35 (Berlin, no date) OCLC 165292661
  - Capriccio and Polacca, Op. 36, for piano (Leipzig, ca. 1819) OCLC 165292638, 315227820
  - Petites Variations sur l'air Vive Henry IV, Op. 36 (also) (C.C. Lose, Copenhagen, ca. 1820s?) (ÖNB)
  - Sonate brillante, Op. 37 (Leipzig, ca. 1818) OCLC 315227464, 165292663
  - Capriccio e Variazioni sopra una Canzonetta Boemica (To gsau Kone, to gsau Kone, to gsau Kone...), Op. 38 (Leipzig, CF Peters, ca. 1818)
  - Polonoise, Op. 42, for piano (Leipzig, no. date) OCLC 165292644
  - Rondeaux brillants et agréables, Op. 44 (Leipzig, ca. 1820) OCLC 165292649
  - Sonate agreeable, Op. 46 (Leipzig, no date) OCLC 165292665
  - Der Fackeltanz, for piano four hands (Berlin, ca. 1823) OCLC 315785836, 230131300
- Chamber music:
  - Sonate facile, Op. 18, for piano and violin (Munich, 1802–1803)
  - Sonata, Op. 28, for piano and cello (Berlin, ca. 1812) OCLC 56763134, 315223723, 497820495
  - Introduzzione e rondoletto for piano and cello (Berlin, ca. 1818–1819)
- Vocal music:
  - Neun deutsche Lieder und Variationen, Op. 2, for voice and piano (Hamburg, 1792) OCLC 475178942, 165292641, 473129820
  - Lied von den Militair-Eleven (Munich, 1806) OCLC 644149184
  - Twelve songs for voice and guitar (Hamburg, before 1821) OCLC 610971586
  - Fünf Tafel-Lieder für Männerstimmen, for the Liedertafel in Berlin (Berlin, ca. 1826) OCLC 315231028
  - Mass
  - Quando corpus morietur for 4 voices (1825)
- Orchestral and Concertante works
  - Concerto for harpsichord or piano and orchestra

== Sources ==
- Brzoska, Matthias (2001). "Meyerbeer [Beer], Giacomo [Jakob Liebmann Meyer]" in Sadie 2001.
- Meyerbeer, Giacomo;Letellier, Robert Ignatius, editor (1999). The Diaries of Giacomo Meyerbeer, Volume 1, 1791–1839. Madison, New Jersey: Fairleigh Dickinson University Press. ISBN 978-0-8386-3789-0.
- Sieber, Anke (2016): Franz Lauska (1764–1825). Biographie, Briefe, Werkverzeichnis. Göttingen: Hainholz ISBN 978-3-86988-219-2.
- Thompson, Oscar; Bohle, Bruce, editors (1975). The International Cyclopedia of Music and Musicians (tenth edition, edited by Bruce Bohle). New York: Dodd, Mead. ISBN 978-0-396-07005-4.
- Sadie, Stanley, editor (2001). The New Grove Dictionary of Music and Musicians, 2nd edition. London: Macmillan. ISBN 978-1-56159-239-5 (hardcover). OCLC 419285866 (eBook).
- Wagner, Undine (2001). "Lauska [Louska, Lausca], Franz [Franz Seraphicus; Franz Seraphinus; František Ignác]" in Sadie 2001.
