= Gottfried Keller (musician) =

German musician and composer (died 1704)

Gottfried Keller (died 1704) was a German keyboard player and composer in England, at least for the last decade of his life, where he was known as Godfrey Keller. He wrote on the basso continuo.

Keller's published chamber music suggests associations in London with John Shore and other musicians. He died in November 1704.

== Works ==
Keller's major work was A Compleat Method for attaining to Play a Thorough Bass (1707). The publisher's preface describes Keller as having been employed in teaching persons to play a thorough-bass, and in this work Keller had been "generously resolved to make easie" the rules of composition. It was the second work printed in England on musical theory, the first being by Matthew Locke. François-Joseph Fétis mentions another edition a Rules or a Compleat Method for attaining to Play a Thorough Bass, London, no date. The Method was revised and by William Holder, and published as an appendix to his own Treatise on Harmony, London, 1731.

Keller's published music included:

- 6 Sonate a cinque, cioè 3 a 2 Violini, Tromba o Oboe, Viola, e Basso continuo; e 3 a 2 Flauti, 2 Oboi o Violini, e Basso continuo, Amsterdam, 1710, perhaps reprinted from a London edition. They have been identified as collaboration with Gottfried Finger.
- 6 Sonate, a 2 Flauti e Basso, also published after Keller's death at Amsterdam.

== Family ==
Keller married Mary Goodrick in 1698, and left two sons, Godfrey and Edward.
