= Marie-Elizabeth Cléry =

French harpist and composer

- Born: 10 November 1762
- Died: 4 August 1811 (aged 48)
- Other names: Mme Duverge-Cléry
- Occupations: harpist, composer

Marie-Elizabeth Cléry (or Mme Duverge-Cléry) née Du Verger or Du Verge (10 November 1762 – 4 August 1811) was a French harpist and composer. She was probably born in Paris and became a harpist in the court of Marie-Antoinette. After her marriage to Jean-Baptiste Cant-Hanet dit Cléry, she published three sonatas for harp accompanied by violin, Trois Sonates pour La Harpe ou Piano-forte avec Accompagnement de Violon (1785).

== Works ==
- 3 Sonates pour la harpe ou pianoforte, with violin accompaniment; edited by Barbara Garvey Jackson. ClarNan Editions, Arkansas, c. 1988. Sonata 1 in C major, Sonata 2 in E♭ major, Sonata 3 in B♭ major
