= Jean-Baptiste Masse =

18th century French composer and cellist

Jean Baptiste Masse (c. 1700 – c. 1757) was a French composer and violoncello player.

He was an Ordinaire de la Chambre du Roi and a member of the King's Bande of Twenty-Four Violins and of the orchestra of the Comédie Française.

Little is known of his life other than the publication dates of his first three volumes of sonatas and the appearance of his name on the payroll of the Comédie Française in 1752 as cellist and bass player.

According to Jules Bonnassies (La Musique à la Comédie Française (1774)) the same musicians were employed from 1752 until 1758 when Masse's name no longer appears on the record; given these dates and the dedication of Book I of the sonatas it is probable that he was employed there between at least 1736 and 1757.

Masse published five volumes of sonatas. Book I (1736), dedicated to Messieurs les Comédiens Français, Book II (1739), dedicated to Monsieur Gaudion de le Grange Conseiller du Parlement, and Book V are for two cellos and basso continuo. Books III and IV are for two solo cellos without a figured bass. Masse indicates that they may be played by bassoons, viols or violins.

He also composed a Premier Suite de Menuets nouveaux à 2 violoncelles. The Masse sonatas are some of the first virtuoso pieces written for cello and basso continuo.
