= Sebastian Bodinus =

German composer

Sebastian Bodinus (c. 1700 – 19 March 1759) was a German composer about whom very little is known. Bodinus was born in the village of Amt Wachsenburg-Bittstädt in Saxe-Gotha and trained as a violinist. It is known that in 1718 he entered the service of the Margrave Karl III of Baden-Durlach at the court in Karlsruhe. Bodinus worked elsewhere but always returned to Karlsruhe and was concertmaster there for two periods. He left Karlsruhe in 1752, returned in a disoriented state in 1758 and was committed to an insane asylum in Pforzheim where he died.

His compositions include concertos and symphonies but there are predominantly chamber works in the late Baroque style, including not only solo and trio sonatas but also quartets, a considerable rarity at the time he composed them in the 1720s and 1730s. Of his quartets it has been said that this "minor master appears to have written first-rate music."
