= Carlos Baguer =

Spanish composer and organist

Carlos (or Carles) Baguer (March 1768 – 29 February 1808) was a Spanish classical era composer and organist.

== Life and career ==
Baguer was born in Barcelona in March 1768 and received his first musical training from his uncle, Francesc Mariner, who was composer and organist in the cathedral in Barcelona. He became deputy organist to Mariner in 1786 and replaced him when his uncle died in 1789, a position he held until his own death. Although Baguer was ordained a priest, he resigned this position in 1801. He died in Barcelona in 1808, on the same day that French troops occupied Barcelona during the Peninsular War.

His students include Mateu Ferrer (who replaced Baguer as organist of the cathedral), Ramon Carnicer (between 1806 and 1808) and possibly Bernat Bertran.

He was one of the most important musical figures in Catalonia at the time and was known as a virtuosic performer and improviser on the organ.

== Works ==
Perhaps Baguer's most important works are his nineteen symphonies, which rank him, along with Luigi Boccherini and Gaetano Brunetti, as one of the principal composers of symphonies in Spain at the time. Most of his symphonies clearly show the influence of the Italian and German composers, in particular Pleyel and Haydn. He also wrote a concerto for two bassoons, an English horn concerto (which is now lost), a series of six duets for flute and many individual keyboard works.

In addition he composed a great deal of religious music, such as masses and Psalms, for use in the Church of St. Philip Neri and the Barcelona Cathedral, and an opera, The Philosopher Princess, which premiered in 1797 at the Teatre Principal in Barcelona.

=== Symphonies ===
- Symphony No. 1 in C major
- Symphony No. 2 in C minor (1790)
- Symphony No. 3 in D major
- Symphony No. 4 in D major
- Symphony No. 5 in D major
- Symphony No. 6 in D major
- Symphony No. 7 in D major
- Symphony No. 8 in D major
- Symphony No. 9 in D major
- Symphony No. 10 in D major
- Symphony No. 11 in D major
- Symphony No. 12 in E♭ major (c. 1786)
- Symphony No. 13 in E♭ major
- Symphony No. 14 in E♭ major
- Symphony No. 15 in E♭ major
- Symphony No. 16 in G major (c. 1790)
- Symphony No. 17 in B♭ major
- Symphony No. 18 in B♭ major (1790)
- Symphony No. 19 in B♭ major (1790)

=== Concertos ===
- Concerto for two bassoons and orchestra in F major
- English horn concerto (1801) (now lost)

=== Chamber music ===
- Sonata No. 2 in G minor for keyboard
- Sonata No. 4 in A major for keyboard
- Sonata No. 16 in E♭ major
- Sonata No. 52 (?) in B♭ major
- Six flute duets

=== Opera ===
- The Philosopher Princess (1797), an opera with a libretto by Carlo Gozzi

=== Oratorios ===
- La mística Raquel en lamento figura de Ntra. Sra. Madre adolorida, en la pasión y muerte de su Divino Hijo
- Muerte de Abel (1802)
- No te abandones
- El Santo Job drame sacré (1804)
- La adoración del Niño Dios por los ángeles y pastores (drama sacro / oratorio) (1805)
- La resurrección de Lázaro (drama sacro / oratorio) (1806)
- La partida del hijo pródigo (drama sacro / oratorio) (1807)
- El regreso á Bara su patria del Dr. Josef Oriol (1807)
- El regreso del hijo pródigo (1807)

=== Sacred music ===
- Mass for four voices and accompaniment
- Mass for two and three voices with accompaniment
- Mass for four voices and accompaniment
- Mass for four voices and accompaniment on "Gaudent in Coeli"
- Mass for eight voices and accompaniment
- Kyrie and Gloria for four voices and accompaniment
- Magnificat for four voices and accompaniment
