= Philippe-Jacques Meyer =

French harpist and composer (1732–1820)

Philippe-Jacques Meyer (1732–1820)^{[a]} was a French harpist and composer. He was born in Strasbourg, studied theology as well as music and gave his first solo concert in Paris in 1761. He was primarily active as a teacher and composer. He traveled extensively between London, Paris and Strasbourg and settled in London in 1784 where he used an anglicised form of his name, Philip James Meyer.

Meyer's 1763 Essai sur la vraie manière de jouer de la harpe is a historical survey of the harp and of harp music and one of the first pedagogical harp treatises. Meyer himself was one of the first to perform on the then-new pedal harp in Paris, in 1765, and the first to perform on one in London, during his first visit in 1772.

He married in Strasbourg in 1768, and had 2 sons – one also named Philip James – who were both also performers on and composers for the harp.

== Treatises and compositions ==
- 1763 Essai sur la vraie manière de jouer de la harpe, avec une méthode de l'accorder, op. 1
- 1774 Nouvelle pour apprendre a jouer de la harpe avec la manière de l'accorder, op. 9
- Divertimenti for Flute, Harp and Violin
- Divertimenti for Harp and Violin, Op.2
- 12 English Songs
- Fantasie and Larghetto with Variations
- Favorite Airs with Variations for Harp and Piano
- 4 Favorite Airs with Variations for the Harp
- 6 Harp Sonatas, Op.3
- Mozart's 'Forget Me Not' and 2 Waltzes
- 4 Original Lessons for the Harp
- Rondo on The Italian Monfrina
- Theme and Scotch Air with Variations
- Variations on a Menuet by Exaudet
- Variations on Robin Adair
- Variations on The Bush aboon Traquair
- Variations on Ye Banks and Braes o' Bonny Doon

== Notes ==
a. His dates are sometimes given as 1737–1819, but contemporary newspapers clearly report his death as occurring on 17 January 1820, in his 88th year.
