= Mlle Le Sénéchal de Kerkado =

French composer

Le Sénéchal de Kerkado (c. 1786 – c. 1805) was a French composer.

She had her first opera performed at the age of nineteen; La méprise volontaire ou La double leçon (1805), with libretto by Alexandre Duval, was produced at the Opéra-Comique in Paris on June 5, 1805.
