= Giovanni Carlo Maria Clari =

Italian composer (1677–1754)

Giovanni Carlo Maria Clari (27 September 1677 – 16 May 1754) was an Italian musical composer and maestro di cappella (chapel-master) at Pistoia. He was born at Pisa. He gained his initial grounding in musical education from his father, a violinist originally from Rome who was employed in the service of the church of the Cavalieri di S. Stefano in Pisa.

Clari was the most celebrated pupil of Colonna, maestro di cappella of S. Petronio, at Bologna. He became maestro di cappella at Pistoia about 1712, at Bologna in 1720, and at Pisa in 1736. He is supposed to have died about 1754.

The works by which Clari distinguished himself pre-eminently are his vocal duets and trios, with a basso continuo, published between 1740 and 1747. These compositions, which combine graceful melody with contrapuntal learning, were much admired by Luigi Cherubini. They appear to have been admired by Handel also, since he did not hesitate to make appropriations from them. Clari composed one opera, Il Savio delirante, produced at Bologna in 1695, and a large quantity of church music, several specimens of which were printed in Vincent Novello's Fitzwilliam Music.
