= List of French inventions and discoveries =

Throughout its history, France has made numerous contributions to scientific and technological development. Royal patronage, as well as the establishment of academic institutions under its monarchy, helped early scientific inquiry. The emphasis on empirical observation during the Age of Enlightenment aided the progress. The French Revolution caused periods of instability; however, its era saw developments such as the standardization of the metric system. Pioneering contributions include the work of Nicéphore Niépce and Louis Daguerre in photography, Clément Ader's early unsuccessful attempts at powered flight, foundational research in nuclear physics by Henri Becquerel and Marie Curie, and Louis Pasteur's work in microbiology and immunology.

== Arts and entertainment ==
- Gothic art in the mid-12th century.
- Ars nova: a musical style which flourished in the Kingdom of France and its surroundings during the Late Middle Ages.
- Oboe, or hautbois, in the mid-17th century France, probably by Jacques-Martin Hotteterre and his family or by the Philidor family. Variants of the oboe like the graïle, the bombard and the piston were later created in Languedoc and Brittany.

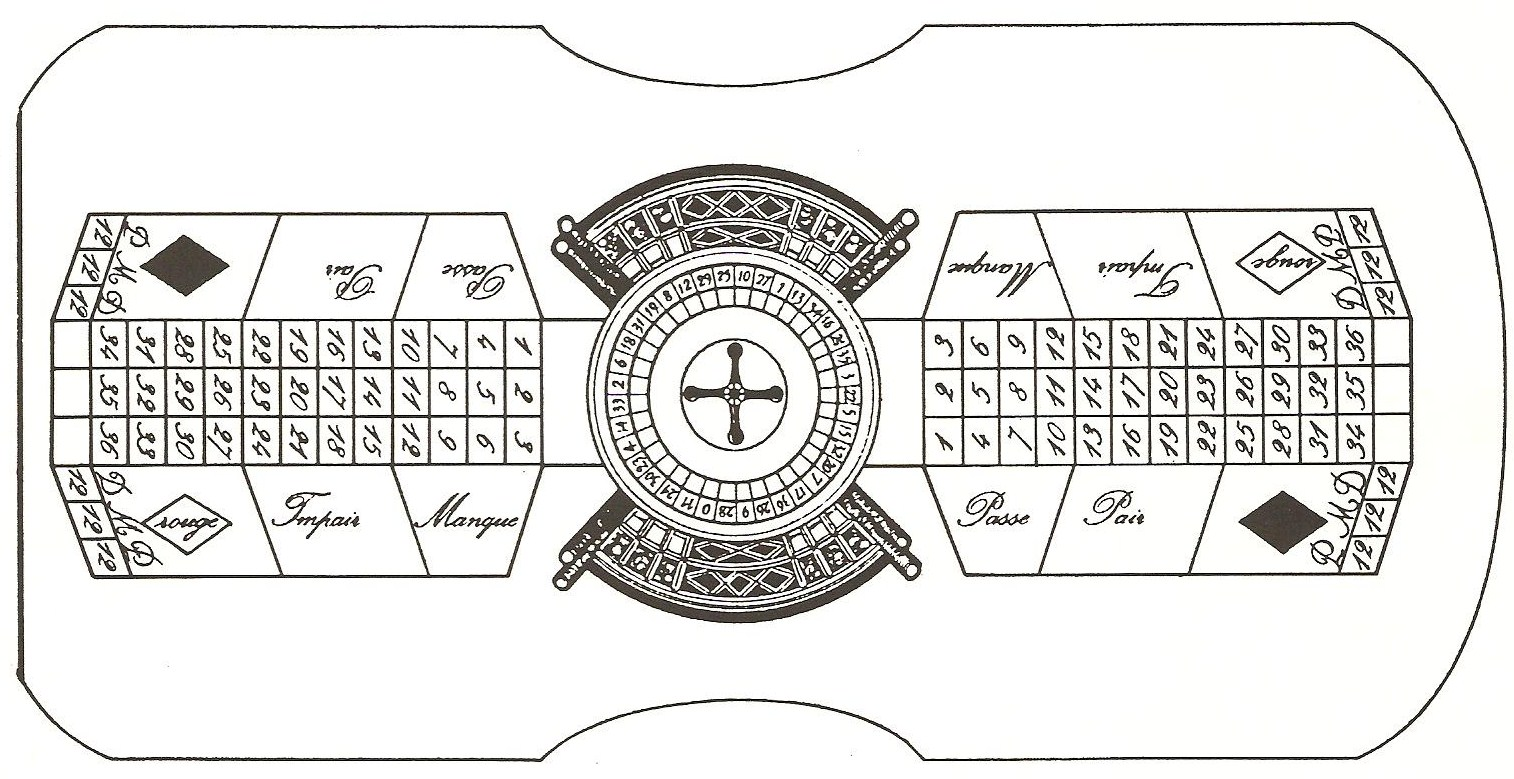
1800s engraving French Roulette

- Many bagpipes were developed in France, including the Biniou, the bodega, the Boha, the Bousine, the Cabrette, the Chabrette, the Cornemuse du Centre, the loure, the Musette bechonnet, the Musette bressane and the Musette de cour.
- First mechanical metronome by Étienne Loulié in 1696 (but the modern form of the metronome was patented only in 1815).
- Rococo in the early 18th century.
- Clavecin électrique, earliest surviving electric-powered musical instrument, in 1759 by Jean-Baptiste Thillaie Delaborde
- Roulette was developed in 18th century France from a primitive form created by Blaise Pascal (17th century). In 1843, Louis and François Blanc introduced the single 0 style roulette wheel.
- Many other gambling games and card games, including the French suits (c. 1480), were invented in France, some from earlier games.
  - From earlier Italian games, Basset, Biribi and Tarot (see Tarot of Marseilles and French tarot)
  - From earlier Spanish games, Quinze and, maybe, Piquet
  - Others: Faro (from the Basset), Brelan, Bouillotte, Commerce, Trente et Quarante, Belote and maybe Blackjack.
- Photography
  - Photolithography and the first photographic image ever produced in 1822 by Nicéphore Niépce (Saône-et-Loire)
  - Daguerreotype by Nicéphore Niépce and Louis Daguerre
  - Hércules Florence coined the term photographie in 1834, the origin of the English word photography.

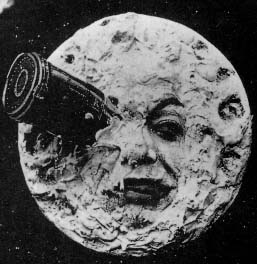
A scene from the film A Trip to the Moon (1902) by Georges Méliès

- Fairground organ by Joseph and Antoine Limonaire and Giacomo Gavioli.
- Collotype process by Alphonse Poitevin in 1856.
- Beaux-Arts architecture: a 19th-century architectural style drawing upon principles of French neoclassicism, and taking inspiration from the baroque and rococo styles.
- Impressionism: a 19th-century art movement originating with Parisian artists.
- Vaudeville: a theatrical genre of variety entertainment born in France at the end of the 19th century.
- The praxinoscope of Charles-Émile Reynaud (1877) is an animation device intermediary between the zoetrope and film.
- Bal-musette: a style of French instrumental music and dance that first became popular in Paris in the 1880s. Although it began with bagpipes as the main instrument, this instrument was replaced with accordion, on which a variety of waltzes, polkas, and other dance styles were played for dances.
- Cabaret by Rodolphe Salis in 1881 in Paris.
- Chronophotography by Étienne-Jules Marey (co-developed with Eadweard Muybridge, Albert Londe, Georges Demeny and Ottomar Anschutz) in 1882 in Paris.
- Ambient music: as an early 20th-century French composer, Erik Satie used such Dadaist-inspired explorations to create an early form of ambient/background music that he labeled "furniture music" (Musique d'ameublement). This he described as being the sort of music that could be played during a dinner to create a background atmosphere for that activity, rather than serving as the focus of attention.
- Cinema, developed from chronophotography:
  - First motion picture camera and first projector by Louis Le Prince, Frenchman who worked in the United Kingdom and the United States.
  - The cinematograph by Léon Bouly (1892).
  - First commercial, public screening of cinematographic films by Auguste and Louis Lumière in Paris on 28 December 1895.
  - Georges Méliès: first filmmaker to use the stop trick, or substitution, multiple exposures, time-lapse photography, dissolves, and hand-painted color in his films. His most famous film, A Trip to the Moon (Le voyage dans la Lune), in 1902, was the first science fiction film and the most popular movie of its time (another of his productions, Le Manoir du diable is also sometimes considered the first horror movie).
- Impressionist music: developed during the late 19th century by French composers, such as Claude Debussy and Maurice Ravel.
- Developments of the modern piano (invented by the Italian Bartolomeo Cristofori) : Pleyel et Cie (double piano), Sébastien Érard (double escapement action), Jean-Louis Boisselot (sostenuto pedal), Henri Fourneaux (Player piano).
- Fauvism: a style of art pioneered by early 20th-century French modern artists whose works emphasized painterly qualities and strong color over the representational or realistic values retained by Impressionism.
- Ondes Martenot in 1928 by Maurice Martenot (early electronic musical instrument ).
- Gemmail in the 1930s by painter Jean Crotti.
- Musique concrète: a type of music composition that utilizes recorded sounds as raw material developed by French composer Pierre Schaeffer beginning in the early 1940s.
- Sampling (music): sampling originated in the 1940s with musique concrète.
- Clavioline, an electronic keyboard instrument, by Constant Martin in 1947.
- Etch A Sketch, a brand of mechanical drawing toy, invented by André Cassagnes in the late 1950s.
- Yé-yé: a style of pop music that emerged in France.
- Cold wave: a music genre that emerged with French, as well as Belgian and Polish musicians in the late 1970s.
- DivX around 1998 by Jérôme Rota at Montpellier.
- Synthwave: originated in France by producers such as David Grellier, Justice, and Kavinsky.
- Blackgaze: a fusion of black metal and shoegaze that traces its origins to the work of French musician Neige.

== Chemistry ==
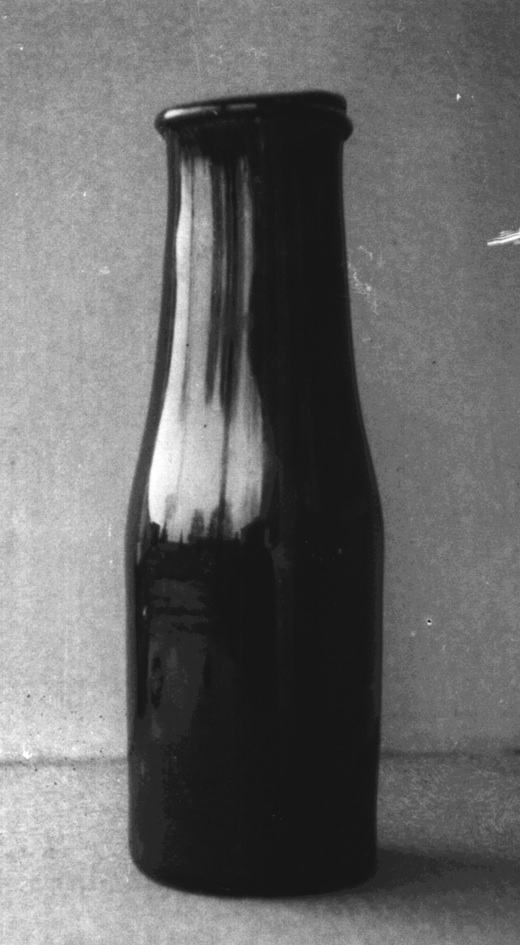
Appert canning jar

- Discovery of natural rubber/latex by Charles Marie de La Condamine in 1736.
- Oxygen, discovered by Carl Wilhelm Scheele in Uppsala, Sweden, in 1772, and labelled "fire air", would be renamed by Antoine Lavoisier in 1778.
- Hydrogen by Antoine Lavoisier in 1783.
- Argand lamp by Swiss-born Aimé Argand and by Antoine Quinquet in 1783 in Paris.
- The first extensive list of elements (see periodic table) by Antoine Lavoisier in 1787.
- Leblanc process by Nicolas Leblanc in 1791.
- Beryllium by Louis-Nicolas Vauquelin
- Chromium by Louis-Nicolas Vauquelin in 1797
- Appertization or Canning by Nicolas Appert in 1809.
- Polyvinyl chloride in 1838 by Henri Victor Regnault (but the PVC will only be plasticized industrially nearly a century later).
- Helio
- Photovoltaic effect by Alexandre-Edmond Becquerel in 1839.
- Pasteurization by Louis Pasteur and Claude Bernard in April 1862.
- Gallium by Paul Émile Lecoq de Boisbaudran in 1875.
- Production of Liquid oxygen by Louis Paul Cailletet in 1877 (at the same time but with another method than Raoul Pictet).
- Artificial silk by Hilaire de Chardonnet in 1884.
- Chamberland filter, also known as a Pasteur–Chamberland filter, a porcelain water filter invented by Charles Chamberland in 1884.
- Fluorine by Henri Moissan in 1886
- Aluminium electrolysis in 1886 by Paul Héroult (at the same time but independently from American Martin Hall).
- Europium by Paul Emile Lecoq de Boisbaudran in 1890
- Viscose by Hilaire de Chardonnet in Échirolles in 1891.
- Chemical Bleach by Claude Berthollet and Antoine Germain Labarraque (with the Swedish chemist Karl Wilhelm Scheele and Scottish chemist Charles Tennant)

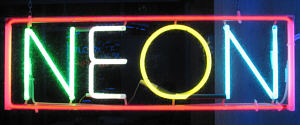
Neon sign

- Berthelot's reagent by Marcellin Berthelot in the late nineteenth century.
- Polonium by Pierre and Marie Curie in July 1898.
- Radium by Pierre and Marie Curie in December 1898.
- Boron carbide by Henri Moissan in 1899.
- Actinium by André-Louis Debierne in 1899.
- Discovery of the Grignard reaction or Grignard reagent by Victor Grignard in 1900.
- Verneuil process (method to manufacture synthetic gemstones) by Auguste Verneuil in 1902.
- Laminated glass by the French chemist Edouard Benedictus in 1903.
- Moissanite by Henri Moissan in 1904.
- Neon lighting by Georges Claude in 1910.
- Francium by Marguerite Perey in 1939.

== Physics, mathematics and measure ==
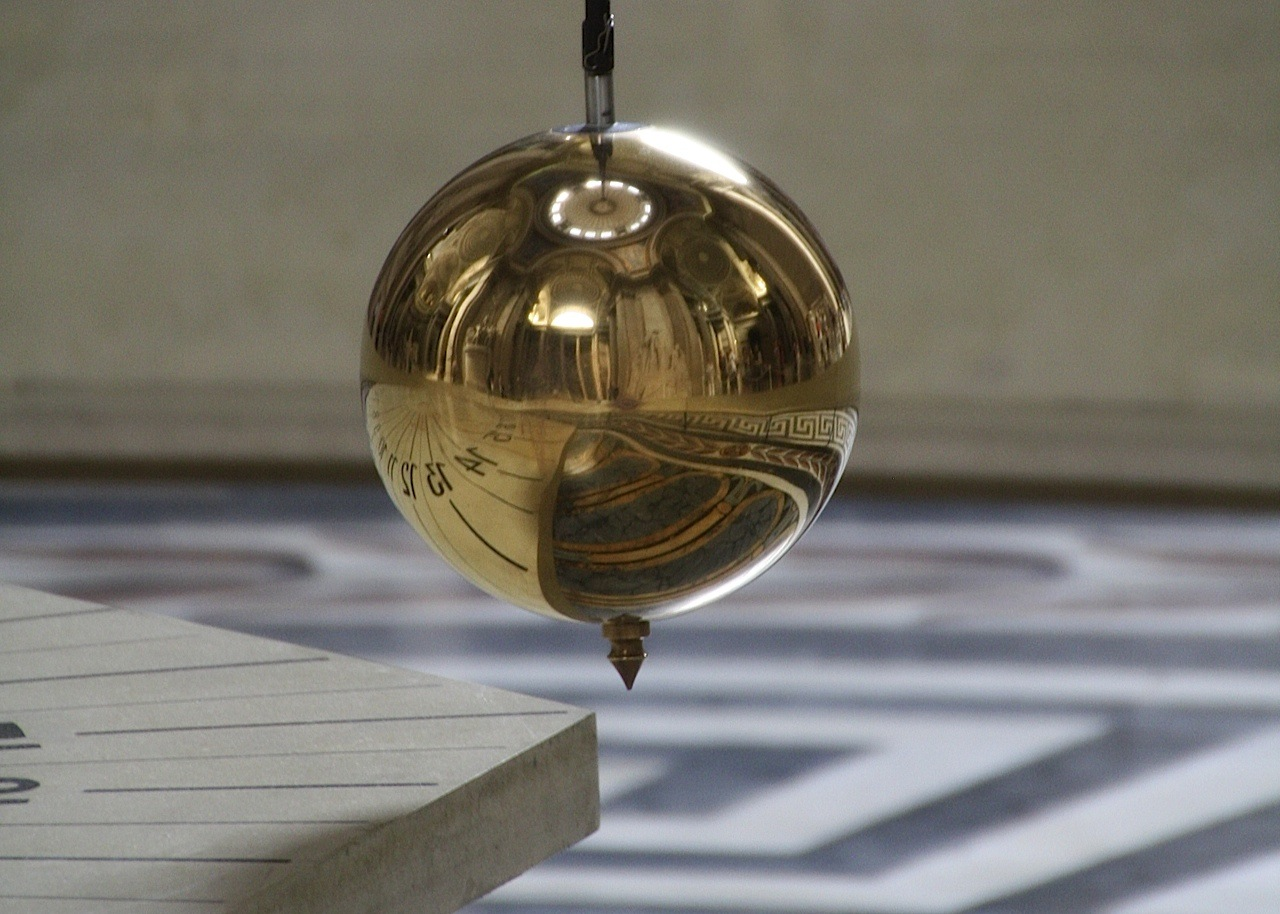
The Foucault pendulum in the Panthéon, Paris

- Cartesian coordinate system by René Descartes in 1637 (and independently by Pierre de Fermat at the same period).
- The calculator by Blaise Pascal (Pascaline) in 1642. (see also Adding machine)
- Probability theory by Pierre de Fermat and Blaise Pascal in the seventeenth century (with Gerolamo Cardano and Christiaan Huygens).
- Vernier scale by Pierre Vernier in 1631.
- Spirit level by Melchisédech Thévenot in 1661.
- Roberval Balance by Gilles de Roberval in 1669.
- Réaumur scale by René Antoine Ferchault de Réaumur in 1730.
- Pitot tube by Henri Pitot in 1732 and modified to its modern form in the mid-19th century by Henry Darcy.

Comparison of De Moivre's approximation with the factorial; the formula is now known as Stirling's approximation.

- Stirling's formula was discovered and proven by Abraham de Moivre c. 1733.
- The conservation of mass by Antoine Lavoisier (18th century).
- Modern hydrometer by Jacques Charles.
- Metric system during the French Revolution. and several measures used in physics in the SI.
- Laplace's equation, Laplace operator, Laplace transform, Laplace distribution, Laplace's demon, Laplace expansion, Young–Laplace equation, Laplace number, Laplace limit, Laplace invariant, Laplace principle, proof that every equation of an even degree must have at least one real quadratic factor, solution of the linear partial differential equation of the second order and general proof of the Lagrange reversion theorem by Pierre-Simon Laplace in the late eighteenth and the early nineteenth century.
- The Gay-lussac Scale used by hydrometers and alcoholometers by Joseph Louis Gay-Lussac (after an idea of Jacques Charles).

Optical pumping of a laser rod (bottom) with an arc lamp (top). Red: hot. Blue: cold. Green: light. Non-green arrows: water flow. Solid colors: metal. Light colors: fused quartz. Refs: , ,

- Polariscope and discovery of Rotary polarization by François Arago. He invented the first polarization filter in 1812.
- Arithmometer by Thomas de Colmar in 1820.
- Dynamometer by Gaspard de Prony (de Prony brake) in 1821.
- Complex analysis and complex function theory by Augustin-Louis Cauchy, including Cauchy's integral theorem.
- Fourier analysis and Fourier transform by Joseph Fourier in 1822.
- Electrometer by Jean Peltier.
- Foucault pendulum by Léon Foucault (who also developed and named the Gyroscope) in February 1851 in the Meridian of the Paris Observatory.
- Ocean thermal energy conversion in 1881 by Jacques-Arsène d'Arsonval (first OTEC plant in 1930 in Cuba by his student Georges Claude).
- Radioactivity by Henri Becquerel in 1896.
- Theorical foundations and mathematical framework of Special relativity by Henri Poincaré, before Albert Einstein used his work in 1905 and later.
- Integral imaging by Gabriel Lippmann on 3 March 1908.
- Darrieus wind turbine by Georges Jean Marie Darrieus in 1931.
- Optical pumping by Alfred Kastler in the early 1950s.
- The multiwire proportional chamber by Georges Charpak in 1968.
- Linear logic by Jean-Yves Girard in 1987.

== Medicine and biology ==
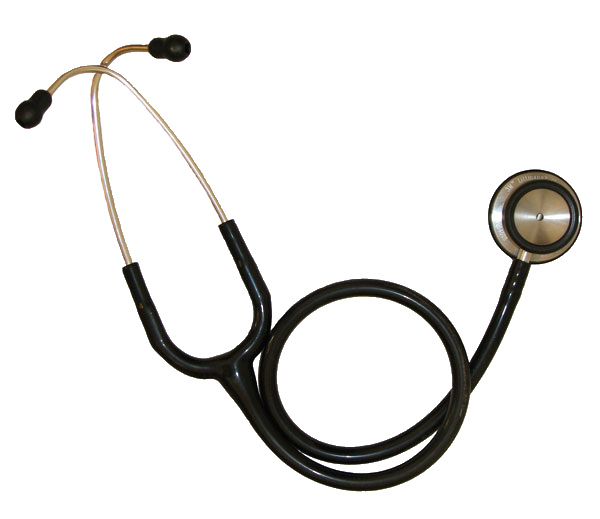
Modern stethoscope

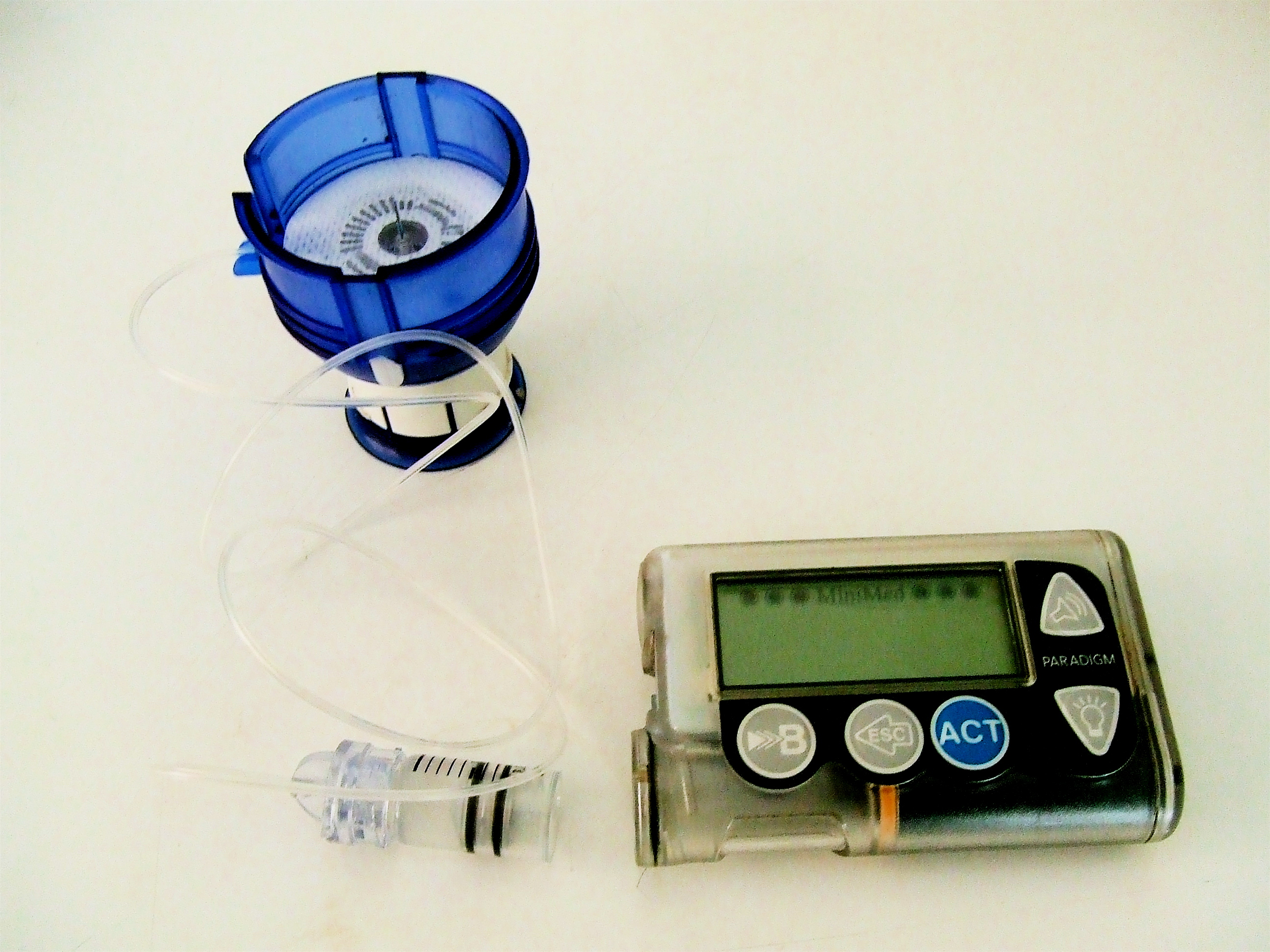
Insulin pump, showing an infusion set loaded into spring-loaded insertion device

- Lamarckism, the first cohesive theory of evolution as well as a theory of inheritance of acquired characteristics, laid out by French biologist Jean-Baptiste Lamarck in 1809. Long dismissed in favour of Darwinism, recent developments in the field of epigenetics have led scientists to debate whether Lamarckism was, in fact, correct to an extent.
- Ligature of arteries in 1565 by Ambroise Paré.
- Blood transfusion by Jean-Baptiste Denys on 15 June 1667. and first modern transfusion by Émile Jeanbrau on 16 October 1914 (after the first non-direct transfusion performed on 27 March 1914, by the Belgian doctor Albert Hustin).
- Modern dentistry by Pierre Fauchard (father of modern dentistry, early eighteenth century).
- Modern cataract surgery by Jacques Daviel in 1748 (even if early cataract surgery already existed in the antiquity).
- Discovery of osmosis in 1748 by Jean-Antoine Nollet. The word osmosis descends from the words endosmose and exosmose, which were coined by French physician René Joachim Henri Dutrochet (1776–1847) from the Greek words ένδον (endon : within), έξο (exo : outside), and ωσμος (osmos : push, impulsion).
- The first lifesize obstetrical mannequin, for teaching, by Angelique du Coudray in the 1750s.
- Stethoscope in 1816 by René Laennec at the Necker-Enfants Malades Hospital in Paris.
- Medical Quinine in 1820 by Joseph Bienaimé Caventou.
- Codeine first isolated in 1832 by Pierre Robiquet.
- Aspirin in 1853 by Charles Frédéric Gerhardt.
- Hypodermic needle in 1853 by Charles Pravaz.
- Blind experiment by Claude Bernard (nineteenth century).
- Discovery of Plasmodium and its role in malaria by Charles Louis Alphonse Laveran on 6 November 1880.
- Incubator or Neonatal intensive care unit in 1881 by Étienne Stéphane Tarnier. His student, Pierre-Constant Budin, followed in Tarnier's footsteps, creating perinatology in the late 1890s.
- Germ theory of disease by Louis Pasteur.
- Rabies vaccine by Louis Pasteur and Émile Roux in 1885.
- Antibiotics by Louis Pasteur and Jean Paul Vuillemin (by means of natural antibiosis; modern artificial antibiotics were developed later by the British Alexander Fleming).
- Mantoux test by Charles Mantoux in 1907.
- Tuberculosis vaccine by Albert Calmette and Camille Guérin in 1921 (BCG).
- Antipsychotics in 1952 by Henri Laborit (chlorpromazine).
- Discovery of the cause of Down syndrome (chromosome 21 trisomy) by Jérôme Lejeune in 1958-1959 (syndrome first described by Jean-Étienne Dominique Esquirol, Édouard Séguin and John Langdon Down)
- First bone marrow transplant by Georges Mathé, a French oncologist, in 1959 on five Yugoslavian nuclear workers whose own marrow had been damaged by irradiation caused by a Criticality accident at the Vinča Nuclear Institute.
- Insulin pump in 1981 by Jacques Mirouze (first implantation) in Montpellier.
- Discovery of human immunodeficiency virus by Françoise Barré-Sinoussi and Luc Montagnier (1983).
- Deep brain stimulation (DBS) by Alim-Louis Benabid in 1987.
- Mifepristone, the abortion pill, by Étienne-Émile Baulieu in 1988.
- Hand transplantation on 23 September 1998, in Lyon by a team assembled from different countries around the world including Jean-Michel Dubernard who, shortly thereafter, performed the first successful double hand transplant.
- Telesurgery by Jacques Marescaux and his team on 7 September 2001 across the Atlantic Ocean (New-York-Strasbourg, Lindbergh Operation).
- Face transplant on 27 November 2005 by Bernard Devauchelle.
- CRISPR/Cas9 gene editing by Emmanuelle Charpentier in 2012.

== Transportation ==
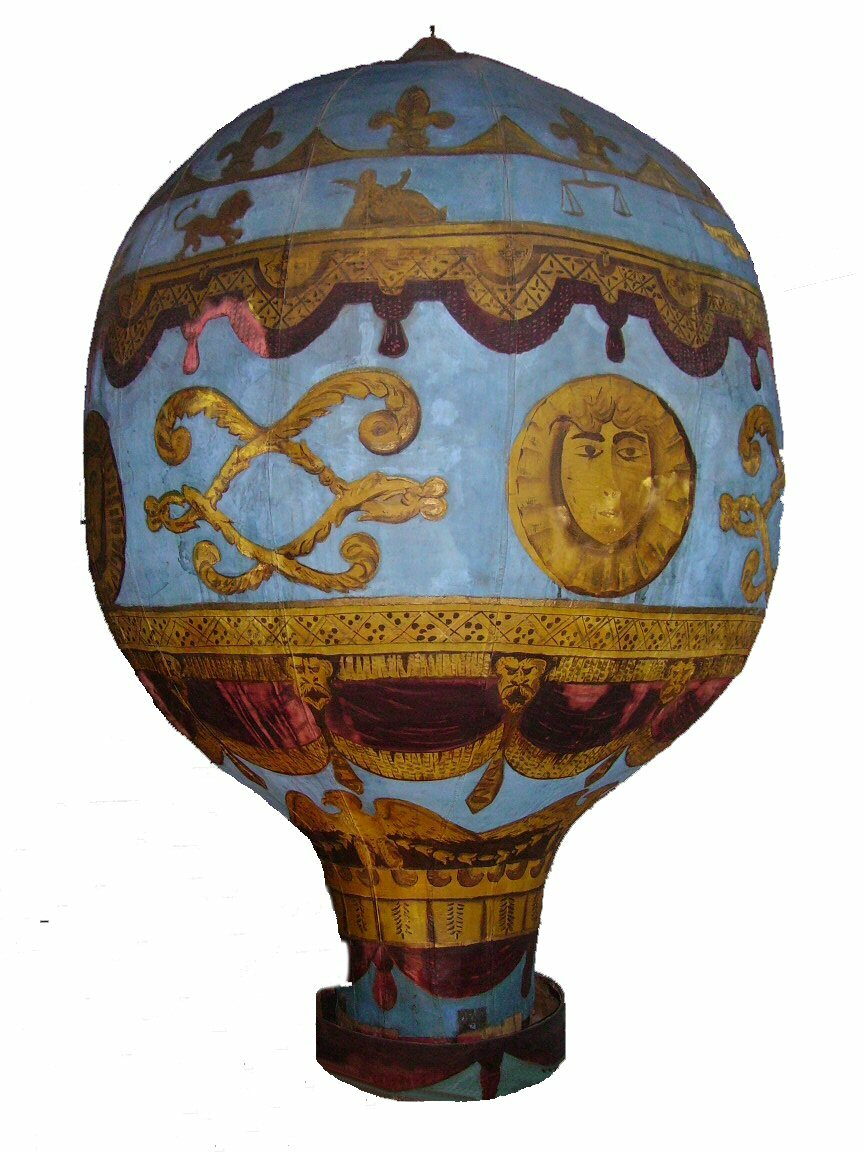
A model of the Montgolfier brothers' balloon at the London Science Museum

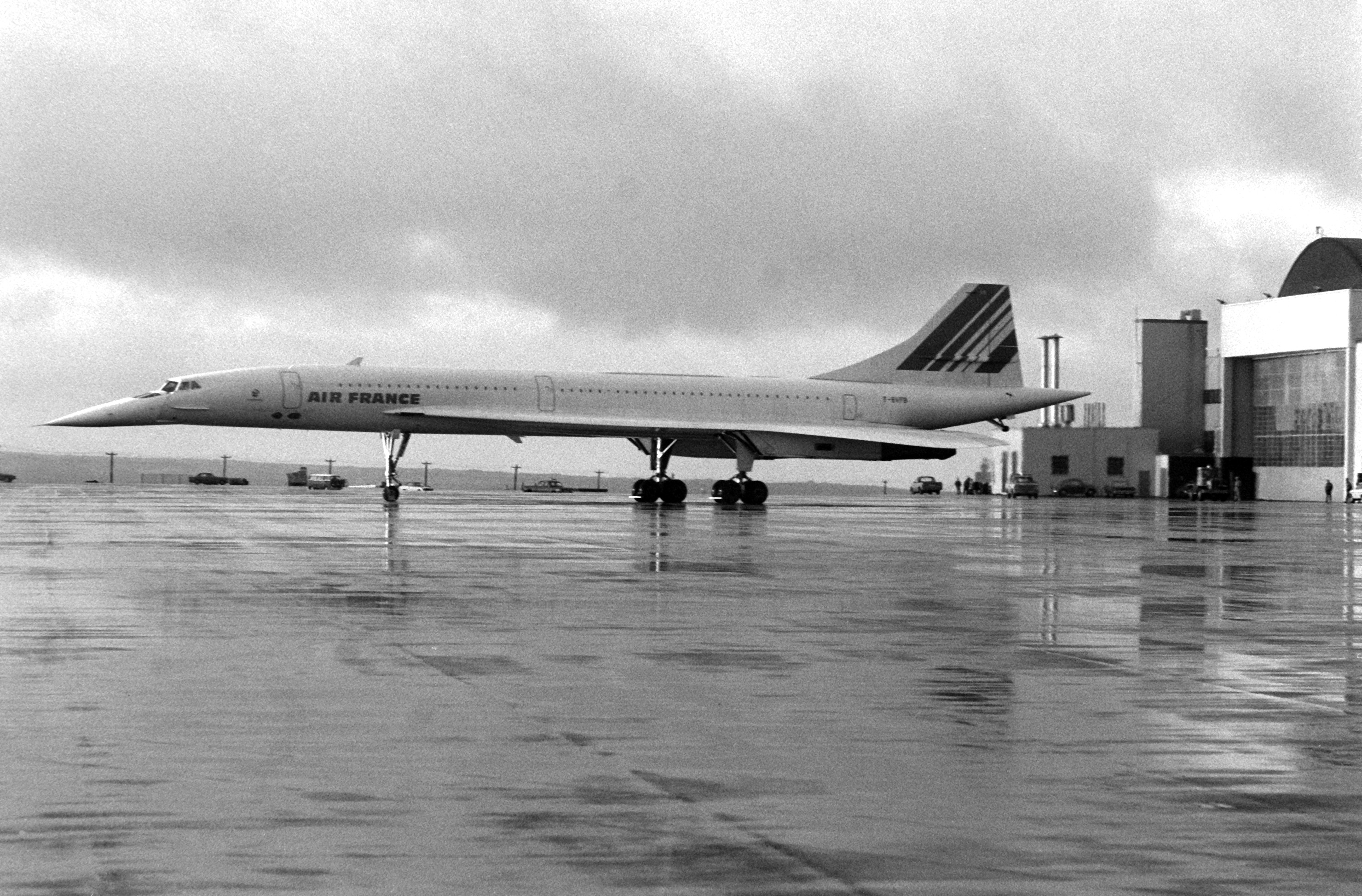
Air France Concorde in 1977

- Taxi by Nicolas Sauvage in Paris in 1640.
- Steamboat by Denis Papin. A boat with the world's first internal combustion engine was developed in 1807 by fellow Frenchman Nicéphore Niépce
- Automobile by Nicolas-Joseph Cugnot in 1769.
- First working Motorcycle, the Michaux-Perreaux steam velocipede by Louis-Guillaume Perreaux patented in 1869.
- Hot Air Balloon (later, Aerostat and Airship) by Jean-François Pilâtre de Rozier, François Laurent d'Arlandes, the Montgolfier brothers and Jacques Charles (who also invented the first hydrogen-filled balloon).
- Parachute in the late 18th century by Louis-Sébastien Lenormand.
- Compressed air vehicle and Pneumatic motor by Andraud and Tessie of Motay in Chaillot on 9 July 1840, improved by Louis Mékarski in 1843 in Nantes (see Mekarski system and Compressed air car).
- In air travel:
  - First glider to fly higher than its point of departure, by Jean-Marie Le Bris in 1856.
  - First manned, powered, heavier-than-air flight of a significant distance on 9 October 1890, by Clément Ader.
  - First aileron, built by Robert Esnault-Pelterie in 1904. Modern design of ailerons by Henri Farman.
  - First aircraft design with the modern monoplane tractor configuration of aircraft by Louis Bleriot in 1908.
- Injector by Henri Giffard in 1858
- Internal combustion engine between 1859 and 1861 by Alphonse Beau de Rochas and Belgian-born Étienne Lenoir in Paris.
- Submarine: The first submarine not relying on human power was the French Plongeur (meaning diver), launched in 1863, and using compressed air at 180 psi (1241 kPa).
- Bicycle in 1864 by Pierre Michaux and Pierre Lallement (endless power-transmitting chain invented by Jacques de Vaucanson in 1770 and applied to bicycles by J. F. Tretz).
- Gunpowder powered ornithopter by Gustave Trouvé in 1870
- First manned balloon mail during the Siege of Paris (1871)
- First outboard motorboat by Gustave Trouvé around 1870, patented in May 1880
- Inflatable tyres for cars by Édouard Michelin in 1895
- Scooter (1902) and Moped.
- V8 engine by Léon Levavasseur in 1902
- Modern automobile Drum brake in 1902 by Louis Renault.
- Helicopter: in 1907, the two first flying helicopters were experimented independently by Louis Breguet and Paul Cornu.
- Seaplane by Gabriel Voisin in June 1905 (non-autonomous) and by Henri Fabre in 1910 (autonomous : Fabre Hydravion).
- Ramjet by René Lorin in 1913.
- The first helicopter to be powered by a gasturbine (Alouette II), in 1955
- Catalytic converter by Eugene Houdry in 1956.
- Concorde by Aérospatiale and the British Aircraft Corporation (1969)
- HDI diesel engine in 1998 by PSA Peugeot Citroën.

== Clothing ==
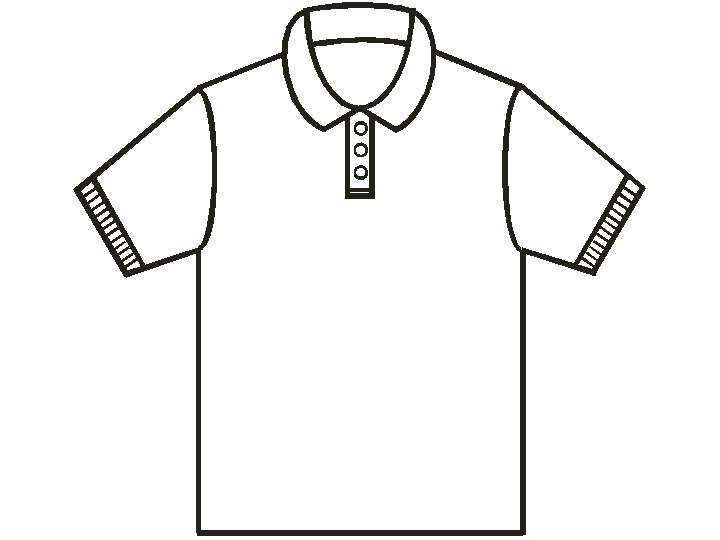
Polo shirt outline

- Bliaut in the 12th century.
- French hood in the early 16th century.
- Attifet in the 16th century.
- Jacquard loom, a mechanical loom, invented by Joseph Marie Jacquard in 1801, that simplifies the process of manufacturing textiles with complex patterns such as brocade, damask, and matelasse.
- Denim Textile (French town of Nîmes, from which 'denim' de Nîmes gets its name)
- Improved, chain stitch, Sewing machine by Barthélemy Thimonnier in 1830.
- Modern bra by Herminie Cadolle in 1889.
- Little black dress by Coco Chanel in the 1920s,
- Polo shirt by René Lacoste in 1926.
- Modern Bikini by Louis Réard in 1946.
- classic modern pencil skirt by Christian Dior in the late 1940s.
- A-line by Yves Saint Laurent in 1958 (term first used in 1955 by Christian Dior).
- Modern Raincoat (not to confuse with the older British trench-coat) by Guy Cotten in 1960.
- Sweatpants by Émile Camuset, the founder of Le Coq Sportif.

== Food and cooking ==
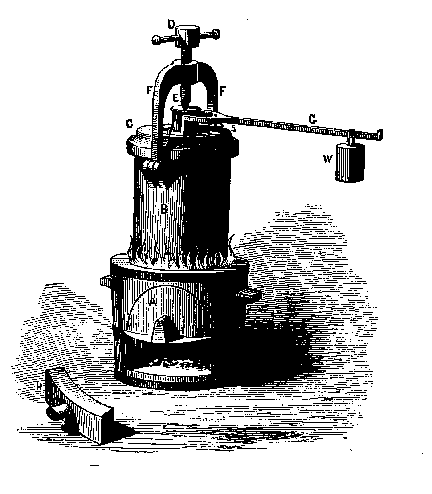
Denis Papin's steam digester

- Steam digester by Denis Papin in 1679.
- Cafetiere : Percolation (method used by Coffee percolator) by Jean-Baptiste de Belloy in 1800 and the French press (another method to make coffee).
- Canning (see above in the chemistry section)
- Absorption refrigerator by Ferdinand Carré in 1858.
- Margarine by Hippolyte Mège-Mouriès in 1869 after the discovery of margaric acid by Michel Eugène Chevreul in 1813.
- Clementine in 1902 by Clément Rodier.
- Food processor by Pierre Verdun between 1963 and 1971.
- Crêpe (List of French dishes)
- Coq au vin

Baguette

- Champagne and other French wines.
- 350 to 400 distinct types of French cheese : List of French cheeses
- Baguette
- Cassoulet
- Foie gras
- Escargot
- Frog legs
- Ratatouille
- Camembert by Marie Harel
- Many pastry

== Weapons and military ==
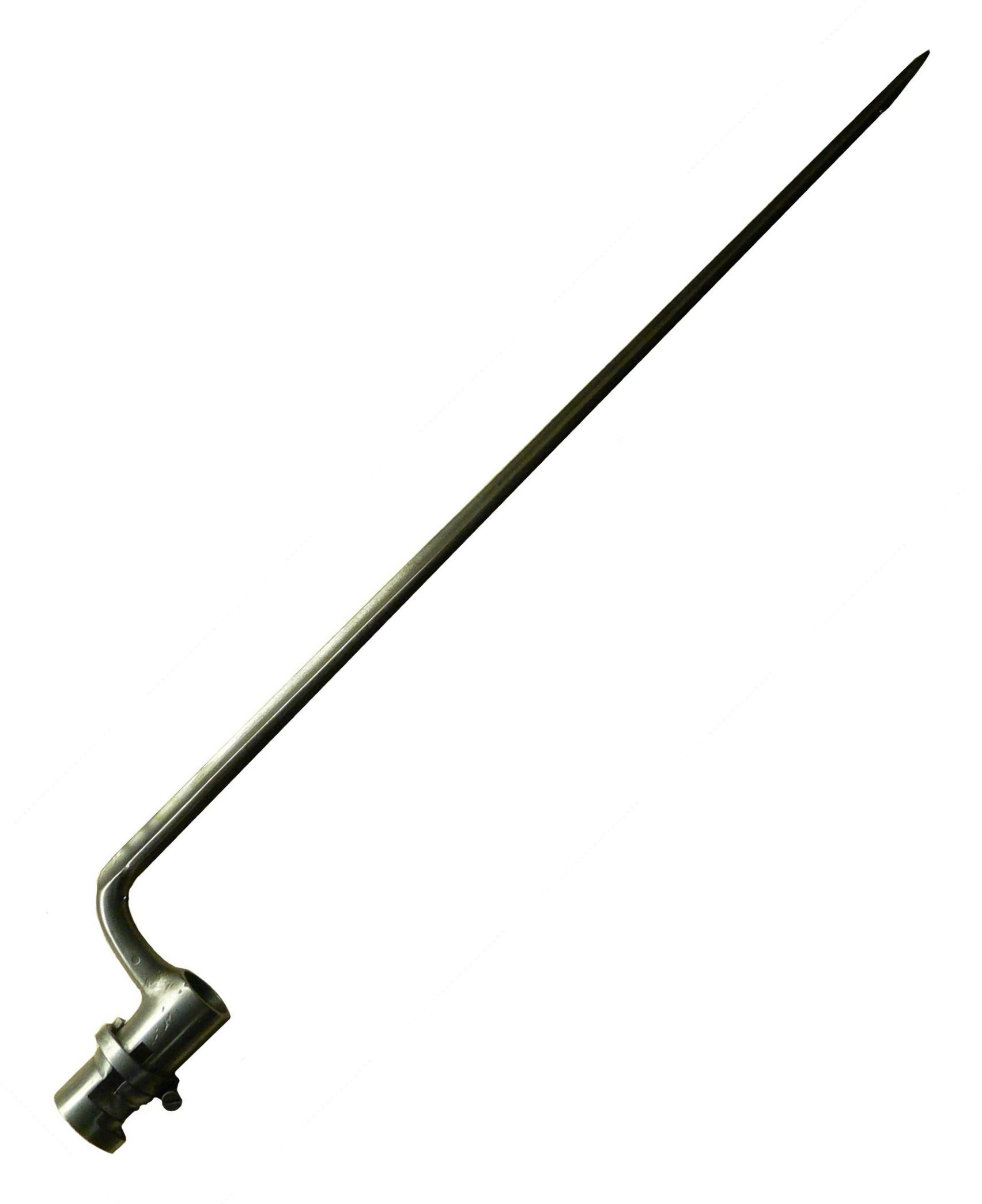
Early-19th century socket bayonet

- Bec de corbin, a popular medieval weapon.
- Motte-and-bailey, a form of castle.
- The Pot-de-fer, a primitive cannon during the Hundred Years' War.
- Culverin, ancestor of the musket.
- Flintlock by Marin le Bourgeoys in 1612.
- Corvette, a small, maneuverable, lightly armed warship that appeared in the 1670s.
- Bayonet (from French baïonnette)
- Modern military uniform in the mid 17th century.
- Floating battery, first used during the Great Siege of Gibraltar in September 1782.
- Mass conscription or Levée en masse during the French Revolution.
- Corps by Napoleon in 1805.
- Carabine à tige by Louis-Étienne de Thouvenin (improvement of an earlier invention by Henri-Gustave Delvigne) before 1844.
- Minié rifle by Claude-Étienne Minié, first reliable (easy to load) muzzle-loading rifle in 1849. In the artillery, from 1859, the La Hitte rifled guns were a considerable improvement over the previous smooth-bore guns which had been in use, able to shoot at 3,000 meters either regulars shells, ball-loaded shells or grapeshot. They appear to have been the first case of usage of rifled cannons on a battlefield.
- First naval periscope in 1854 by Hippolyte Marié-Davy.
- Canne de combat and Savate.
- Épée, the modern derivative of the dueling sword, used for fencing.
- Chassepot by Antoine Alphonse Chassepot in 1866.
- Smokeless gunpowder (modern nitrocellulose-based) : Poudre B by Paul Marie Eugène Vieille in 1884. It was first used to load the Lebel Model 1886 rifle (invented by Nicolas Lebel), making it the first military firearm to use smokeless powder ammunition. It is also the first rifle to use full metal jacket bullets as its standard ammunition.
- First Air force in 1910.
- Sonar, first ultrasonic submarine detector using an electrostatic method (and first practical military sonar) in 1916-1917 by Paul Langevin (with Constantin Chilowsky).
- Tanks : developed at the same time (1915–1916) in France and in Great Britain. France was the second country to use tanks on the battlefield (after Great Britain). in 1916, the first practical light tank, the Renault FT with the first full 360° rotation turret became, for armour historian Steven Zaloga "the world's first modern tank".
- Guillotine.

== Communication and computers ==
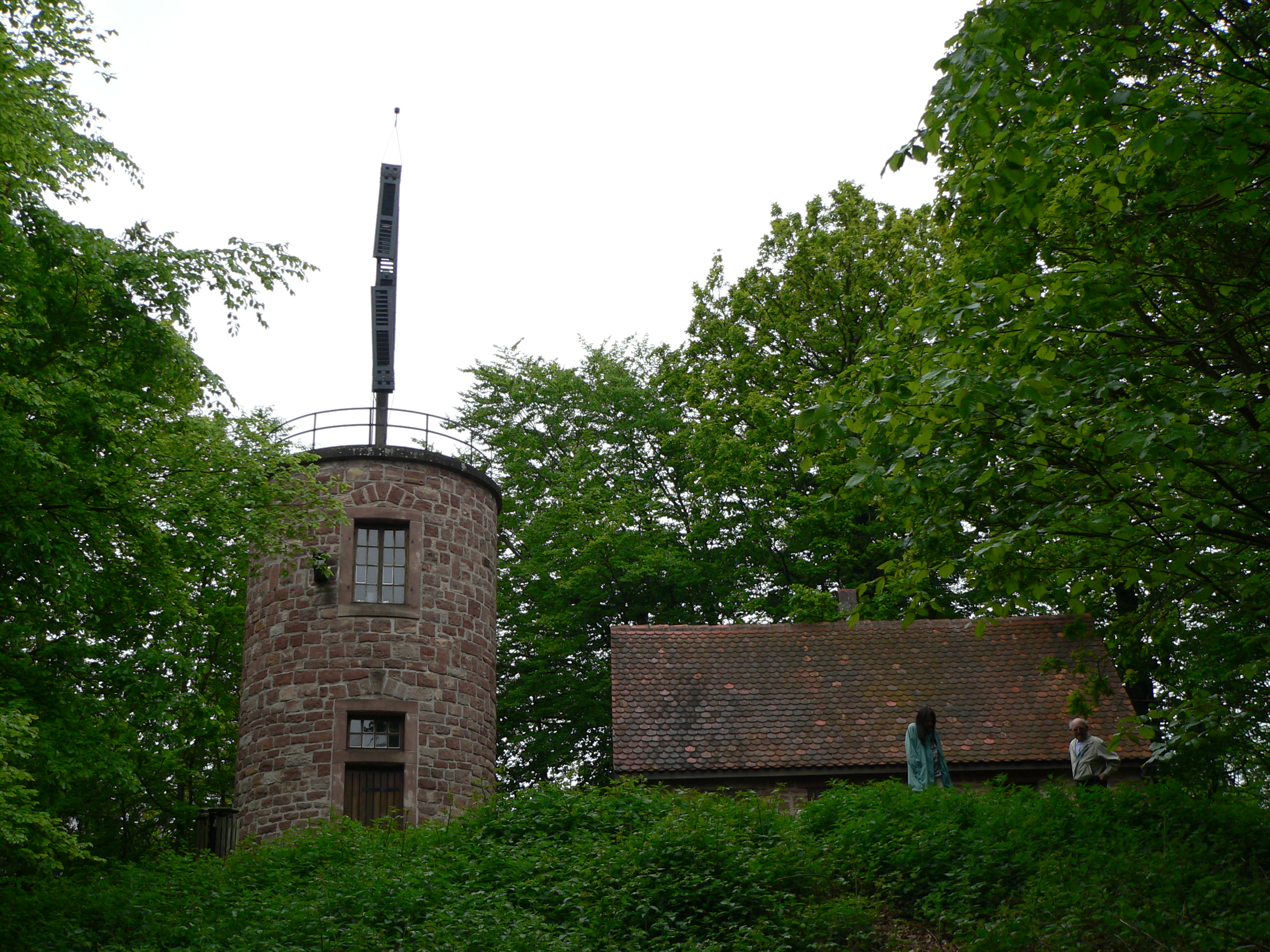
A Chappe semaphore tower near Saverne, France

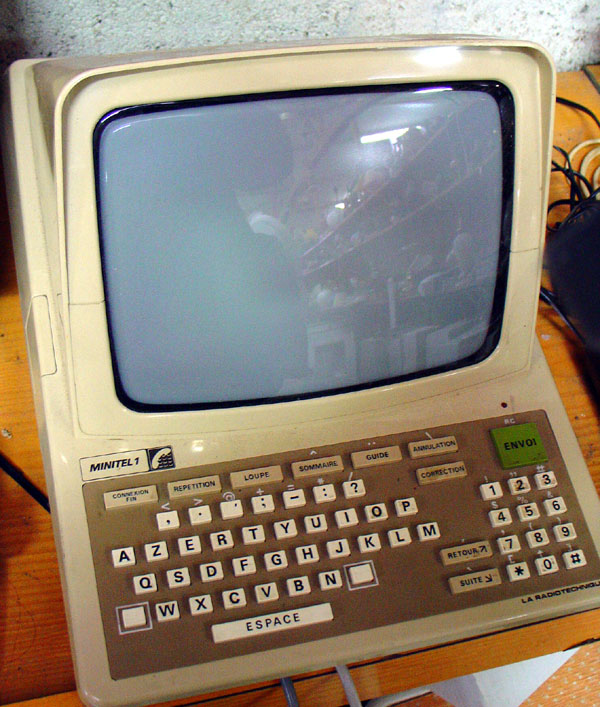
Minitel

- Optical telegraph by Claude Chappe in 1792.
- Modern pencil by Nicolas-Jacques Conté in 1795.
- Paper machine by Louis-Nicolas Robert in 1799.
- Fresnel lens by Augustin-Jean Fresnel
- Jean-François Champollion first deciphered the Rosetta Stone (1822) : modern understanding of Egyptian hieroglyphs
- Braille in 1825 by Louis Braille, a blind Frenchman: first digital form of writing.
- Pencil sharpener by Bernard Lassimone in 1828. Therry des Estwaux created an improved mechanical sharpener in 1847.
- Baudot code by Émile Baudot in 1870 and a multiplexed printing telegraph system that used his code and allowed multiple transmissions over a single line.
- Coherer by Édouard Branly around 1890.
- Belinograph (Wirephoto) by Édouard Belin in 1913.
- The HSL color space was invented in 1938 by Georges Valensi
- Bic Cristal in 1949.
- Bézier curves by Paul de Casteljau in 1959.
- Computer-aided manufacturing by Pierre Bézier in 1971 as an engineer at Renault.
- Micral, earliest commercial, non-kit personal computer based on a microprocessor, by André Truong Trong Thi and François Gernelle in June 1972.
- Datagrams and CYCLADES in 1972-1973 by Louis Pouzin (which inspired Bob Kahn and Vinton Cerf when they invented the TCP/IP several years later).
- Smart Card by Roland Moreno in 1974 after the automated chip card.
- Minitel, a dial up, Videotex system, launched in July 1980, and nationally available from 1982.
- Camera phone by Philippe Kahn in 1997.
- Several Programming languages (non-exhaustive list) :
  - Prolog (Logic programming) by a group around Alain Colmerauer in 1972 in Marseille.
  - LSE, Langage Symbolique d'Enseignement, a French, pedagogical, programming language designed in the 1970s at Supélec.
  - Ada (multi-paradigm) by Jean Ichbiah (who also created LIS and Green) in 1980.
  - Caml (OCaml by Xavier Leroy, Damien Doligez) developed at INRIA and formerly at ENS since 1985.
  - Eiffel (object-oriented) by Bertrand Meyer in 1986.
  - STOS BASIC on the Atari ST in 1988 and AMOS BASIC on the Amiga in 1990 by François Lionet and Constantin Sotiropoulos (dialects of BASIC).
- Several keyboards :
  - AZERTY in the last decade of the 19th century.
  - FITALY by Jean Ichbiah in 1996.
  - BÉPO since 2003.

== Technology ==
Édouard-Léon Scott de Martinville earliest sound recording device.

== Sports ==
The Olympic rings, the symbol of the modern Olympic Games, inspired by Pierre de Coubertin

- Jeu de paume, precursor of tennis, in the 12th century.
- The first autonomous diving suit, the precursor to today's scuba gear, is developed by Paul Lemaire d'Augerville in 1824.
- First documented cycling race, a 1,200 metre race held on 31 May 1868, at the Parc of Saint-Cloud, Paris. The first cycle race covering a distance between two cities was Paris–Rouen (see History of cycling).
- FIFA World Cup by Jules Rimet, FIFA former president.
- UEFA Euro Cup by Henri Delaunay.
- Summer Olympic Games by Pierre de Coubertin.
- International Olympic Committee by Pierre de Coubertin on 23 June 1894.
- On 22 July 1894 the newspaper Le Petit Journal organised the world's first competitive motor race from Paris to Rouen. The first finisher was Count Jules-Albert de Dion but his steamer was ineligible, so the 'official' victory was awarded to Albert Lemaître driving his 3 hp petrol engined Peugeot.
- Pétanque in 1907.
- Rugby World Cup was suggested by Alfred Eluère since 1947 and by Albert Ferrasse in the 70'.
- Triathlon in the 1920s near Paris (Joinville-le-Pont, Meulan and Poissy).
- The Aqua-lung, first Scuba Set (in open-circuit) by Emile Gagnan and Jacques-Yves Cousteau in 1943.
- Parkour in the 1980s by the future Yamakasi, especially David Belle.
- Flyboard in 2012 by Franky Zapata. Another version, the Flyboard Air, an air-propelled hoverboard, achieved a Guinness World Record for farthest flight by hoverboard in April 2016.
- Kitesurf aka flysurf in the 1990s by Manu Bertin and ski mountain derivatives
- Wingsuit in the 1990s by Patrick de Gayardon
- Vendée Globe since 1989 by Philippe Jeantot the first round-the-world single-handed yacht race, sailed non-stop and without assistance
- Paris–Dakar Rally since 1978 by Thierry Sabine
- Trophée Jules Verne since 1985 by Yves Le Cornec the fastest circumnavigation of the world (under 80 days) by any type of sailing yacht with no restrictions on the size of the crew
- 24 Heures du Mans translated 24 Hours Le Mans since 1923 the world's oldest active sports car race in endurance racing
- Fédération Internationale de l'Automobile in 1904; translated as the International Automobile Federation.
- Home Ball in 2011 by Dominique Desbouillons.

== Miscellaneous ==
- Detent escapement by Pierre Le Roy in 1748.
- Carcel burner in 1800.
- Developments of electric battery
  - Dry cell battery by Gaston Planté in 1859 (first practical storage lead-acid battery)
  - In 1866, Georges Leclanché patented the carbon-zinc wet cell battery called the Leclanché cell.
- Interchangeable parts by Honoré Blanc.
- Binoculars (using roof prisms) in 1870 by Achille Victor Emile Daubresse.
- Artificial cement by Louis Vicat.
- Hairdryer in 1879 by Alexandre Godefroy.
- Modern dry cleaning in 1855 by Jean Baptiste Jolly.
- Reinforced concrete by Joseph Monier in 1849 and patented in 1867.
- Loppers by Bertrand de Molleville.
- Ball bearing by Jules Suriray, a Parisian bicycle mechanic, on 3 August 1869.
- Coronagraph by Bernard Lyot in 1930.
- Aquarium by Jeanne Villepreux-Power in 1832.
- Stapler

== See also ==
- List of Dutch inventions and discoveries
- List of German inventions and discoveries
- List of American inventions and discoveries
- List of Irish inventions and discoveries
- List of Italian inventions
- Scottish inventions and discoveries
- List of Swedish inventions
- List of Welsh inventors
- List of Portuguese inventions and discoveries
- Science in the Middle Ages
- Science in the Age of Enlightenment
