= Traditional French musical instruments =

Traditional French musical instruments, known as instruments traditionnels in French, are musical instruments used in the traditional folk music of France. They comprise a range of string, wind, and percussion instruments.

== Percussion instruments ==
- Gumbe — a French Guianan frame drum
- Kayamb (caïamb/kayanm) — a shaken Réunionnais idiophone
- Pahu — a French Polynesian drum
- Pate — a French Polynesian and Wallisian/Futunan log drum
- Rouleur — a Réunionnais drum
- Sunaglieri — Corsican mule bells
- Timpanu — a Corsican triangle

== String instruments ==
- Cetera — a cittern of 4 to 8 double strings that is of Tuscan origin and dates back to the Renaissance, is the most iconic Corsican traditional instrument. Its most prominent exponent is Roland Ferrandi (also a lutenist).
- Cythara — a lute
- Épinette des Vosges — a traditional plucked-string instrument of the zither family from the Vosges region in eastern France
- Mandulina — a Corsican mandolin
- Mandore — a musical instrument, a small member of the lute family, teardrop shaped, with four to six courses of gut strings and pitched in the treble range.
- Tambourin à cordes — a box zither from southern France
- Ukulele — a small, guitar-like instrument from French Polynesia

=== Bowed ===
- Basse de Flandre — a simple large stringed fiddle (a musical bow) made with a long stick from French Flanders in Hauts-de-France.
- Bobre — a bowed instrument from Réunion
- Vielle à roue — a mechanical string instrument that produces sound by a hand-crank-turned, rosined wheel rubbing against the strings.

== Wind instruments ==
=== Flutes ===
French flutes are called flûte. There are many traditional flutes.

- Pu toka — a French Polynesian conch
- Pu'akau — a French Polynesian flute
- Pūʻili — a French Polynesian bamboo flute
- Vivo — a French Polynesian nose flute

=== Reed Instruments ===
- Bombarde (music) — a contemporary conical-bore double-reed instrument (shawm) from Brittany
- Cialamedda (also cialamella/cialambella) — a Corsican reed instrument, more recently with a wooden box body
- Graïle (graile) — a vertical wooden oboe (shawm) from Occitania
- Pirula — a Corsican reed recorder

=== Bagpipes ===
- Binioù kozh — a Breton bagpipe
- Bodega — an Occitan bagpipe
- Boha — a bagpipe from Landes of Gascony in Nouvelle-Aquitaine
- Bousine — a small, droneless bagpipe from Normandy
- Cabrette — a bagpipe from Auvergne in Auvergne-Rhône-Alpes
- Caramusa — a Corsican bagpipe made of wood, leather and reed
- Chabrette — a bagpipe from Limousin in Nouvelle-Aquitaine
- Cornemuse du Centre — a bagpipe from Central France
- Loure — an ancient bagpipe from Normandy

=== Horns ===
- Pifana (also pivana) — a type of Corsican gemshorn generally made from a goat horn

== Other instruments ==
- Boîte à musique — an automatic musical instrument in a box that produces musical notes by using a set of pins placed on a revolving cylinder or disc to pluck the tuned teeth (or lamellae) of a steel comb.
- Orgue de barbarie (also orgue à manivelle) — a mechanical musical instrument from the Alsace region of Grand Est consisting of bellows and one or more ranks of pipes housed in a case, usually of wood, and often highly decorated.
- Orgue de danse — a mechanical organ from Paris, Île-de-France designed to be used in dance halls or ballrooms.
- Orgue de rue — an automatic mechanical pneumatic organ from Paris, Île-de-France designed to be mobile enough to play its music in the street.
- Limonaire — a pneumatic musical organ from Paris, Île-de-France covering the wind and percussive sections of an orchestra.
- Perroquette – a mechanical organ from Mirecourt, Grand Est related to the serinette, the merline, and the barrel organ.
- Pyrophone — a musical instrument in which notes are sounded by explosions, or similar forms of rapid combustion, rapid heating, or the like, such as burners in cylindrical glass tubes, creating light and sound.
- Ralé-poussé — a Réunionnaise accordion
- Riberbula — a jaw harp used by the Corsican people
- Serinette — a mechanical musical instrument from the Lorraine region of Grand Est
- Urganettu — a Corsican diatonic accordion

== See also ==
- Music of France
- French folk music
