= French bagpipes =

Bagpipes from France

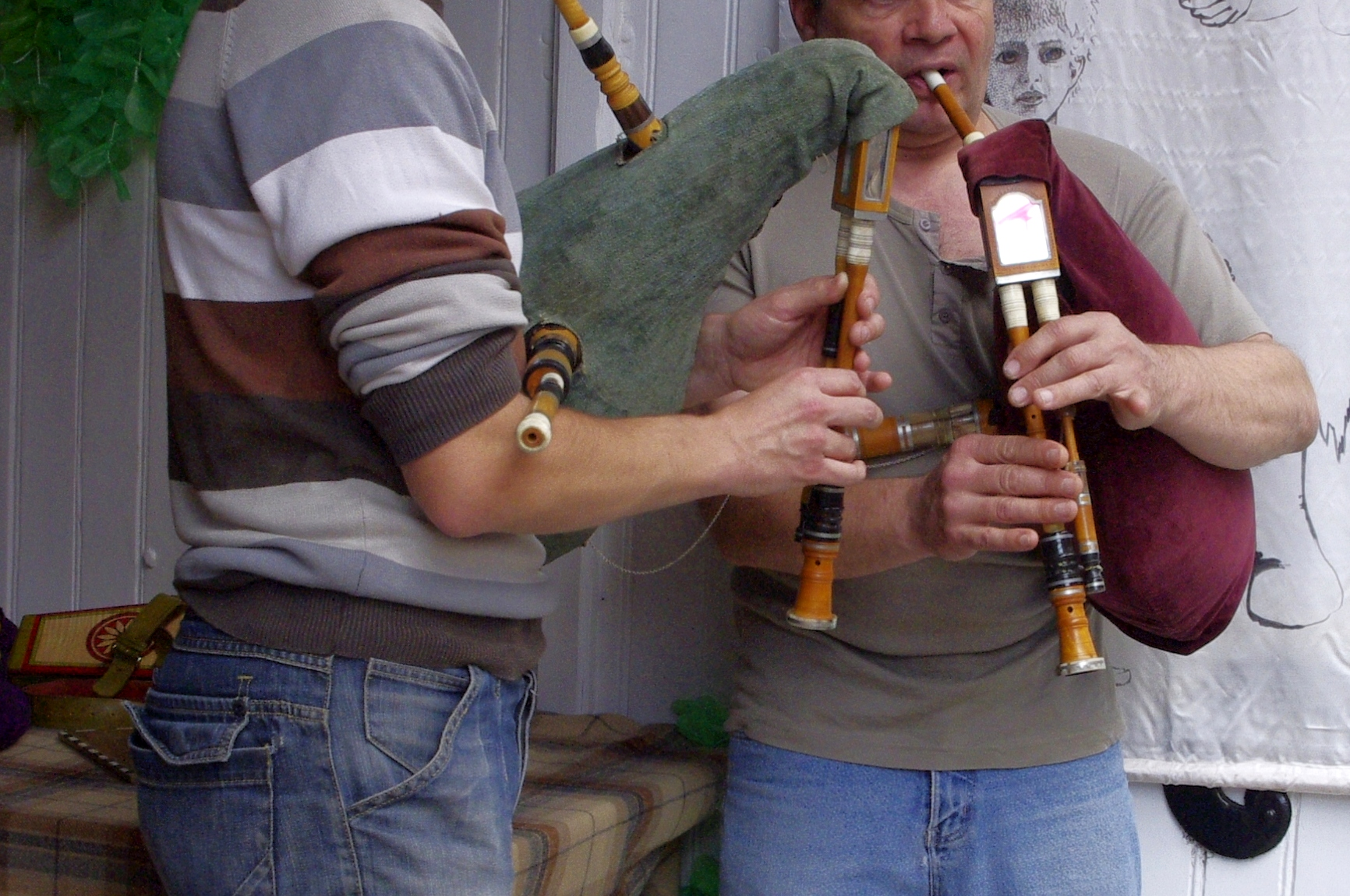
French bagpipes being played.

French bagpipes cover a wide range and variety of styles of bagpipes and piping, from the Celtic piping and Music of Brittany to the Northern Occitan's cabrette.

The Center-France bagpipes (called in French cornemuse du centre or musette du centre) are of many different types, some mouth blown, some bellows blown; some names for these instruments include chevrette (which means "little goat," referring to the use of a goatskin for its bag), chabrette, chabretta, chabreta, cabreta, bodega, and boha. It can be found in the Bourbonnais, Nivernais, and Morvan regions of France.

A distinguishing factor of most French bagpipes is the placement of the tenor drone alongside the chanter rather than in the same stock as the bass drone.

In the northern regions of Occitania: Auvergne, is found the (generally) bellows blown cabreta, and in Limousin the mouth blown chabreta. The cabrette is much played in areas of Paris where Auvergnats tended to settle; this bagpipe is in most cases played without a drone, and together with an accordion. The chabrette, while having a similar name, is a quite different pipe, with a triple-bored bass drone played across the player's arm rather than over the shoulder. The form of the chabrette chanter appears similar to early oboes, including a swallow-tail key for the lowest note which is placed under a fontenelle.

The Occitan names also refer to the goat. In the Occitan region of Languedoc, and especially in the Montanha negre (Black Mountain) area, the bodega is played. This is a very large mouth blown pipe made from the skin of an entire goat. In Gascony, a small mouth blown bagpipe called boha (from bohar meaning "to blow") is used.

There are a number of piping schools. One of the most important is the Conservatoire Occitan, located in the city of Toulouse (Occitania), but there are also important schools in Limoges, Aurillac, Belin, Mazamet, and other towns. There is also a school of cabrette playing in Paris, with around 50 pupils. Although Central French pipes are generally used to play traditional music, some Occitan pop groups use them as well. Such groups include La Talvera, Familha Artus, and Tenareze.

== See also ==
- Biniou
- Bodega (bagpipe)
- Boha
- Bousine
- Cabrette
- Chabrette
- Cornemuse du Centre
- Loure (bagpipe)
- Musette bechonnet
- Musette bressane
- Musette de cour
- Pipasso
- Samponha
- Sourdeline
- Veuze
- Cornamuse
