= Doedelzak =

Traditional bagpipe of Flanders and the Netherlands

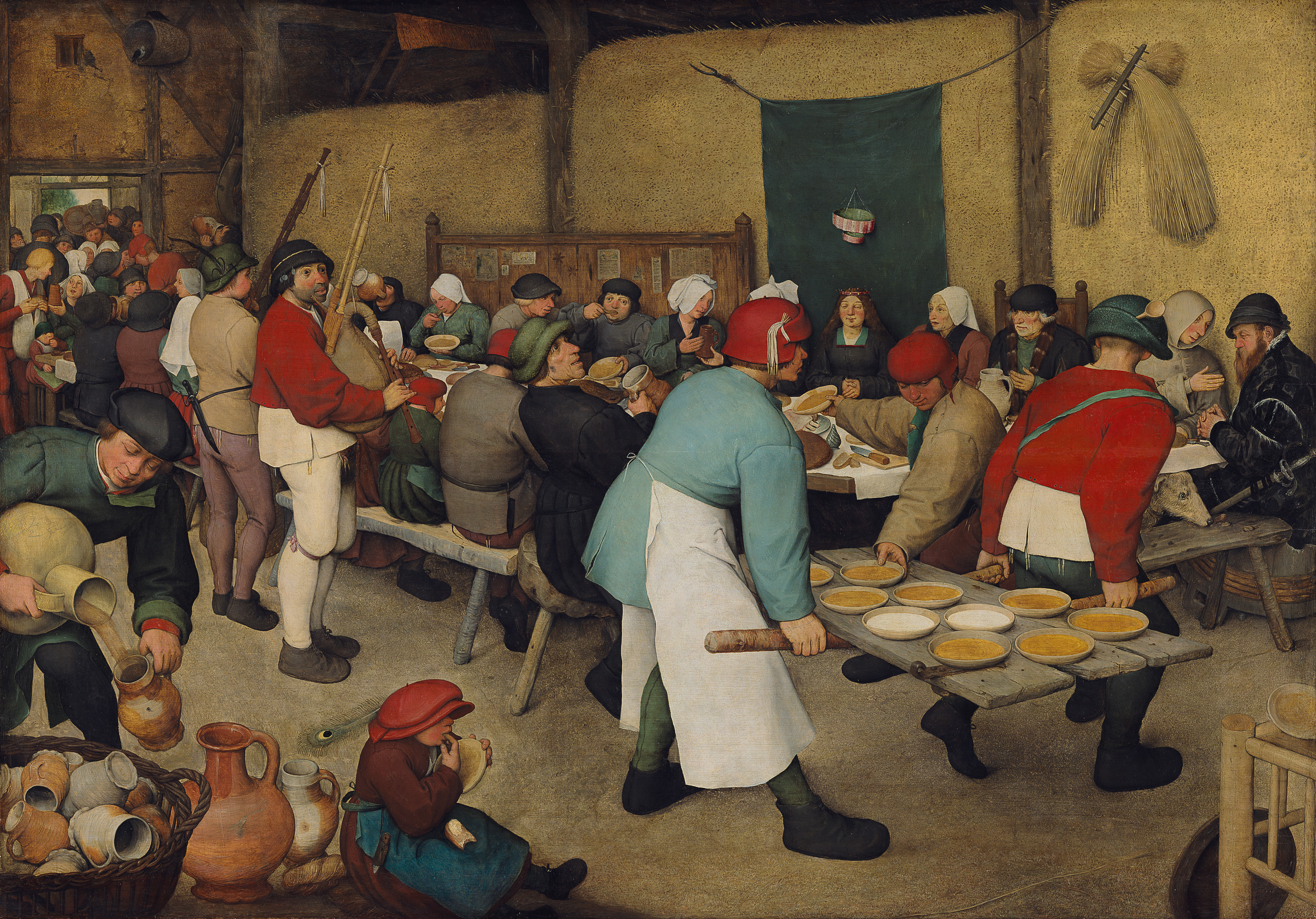
The Peasant Wedding, a 1567 or 1568 painting by Pieter Bruegel the Elder, with two men playing the pijpzak

Doedelzak (Dutch pronunciation: [ˈdudəlˌzɑk]) is the name for bagpipes in the Netherlands and the Flemish (Dutch) speaking northern part of Belgium. This is the region where painter Pieter Bruegel the Elder lived and worked. Formerly pijpzak and moezelzak were common. The latter two names, generic at one time, survive in the piposa (pipe au sac) from Picardy and muchosa (muse au sac) in the actual Belgian province of Hainaut. According to certain sources, muse once was the earliest generic name for this family of instruments in a large part of Europe and survives itself in the actual French generic name of cornemuse for all bagpipes.

The term pijpzak refers to a type of two-droned Flemish bagpipe, as portrayed in the artwork of Pieter Bruegel the Elder and many others. The instrument is held rather in front of the player than under the arm, as can be seen on the painting on top of this article. The two drone pipes, which have single reeds and are typically a fifth apart, are in the same stock and face directly up or slightly forward, depending on the individual position of the piper. The chanter has a conical pierce and a double reed.

== Details ==
The pijpzak is at first sight similar in design to the cornemuse du Centre of Central France. However, the cornemuse du Centre has more variety in the number of drones, having a common stock or not, and their arrangement. The drones can rest backwards over the shoulder, or sideways over the arm, or both as with the chabrette, and the small drone can sit next to the chanter.

A very specific difference between de pijpzak and the cornemuse du Centre however, is the chanter. Modern instruments adopted the standardised chanter of the cornemuse du centre (itself a modern development, allowing overblowing) but the original instrument in Breugel's paintings had a different chanter. It has no thumb hole and has some particularities in the finger holes and the type of reed needed. Only one instrument of the period was partially preserved and is now in the Kunsthistorisches Museum in Vienna; further investigations of this instrument are unfortunately not allowed. However, many years ago a very precise measurement has been executed and all further developments rely on that information.

The Belgian pipe maker Wout Vanloffeld compared the available data to Breugel's very accurate pictures and to the equally precise descriptions Michael Praetorius gave in his Syntagma Musicum. He made reconstructions and models and created an adapted reed, also taking in account the suggestions Praetorius had given, such as the addition of a left thumb hole. The original instrument was not in the key of G, but in D or E, which also matches Praetorius' description. It probably existed as well in a plagal as in an authentic version. Its sound, as well as its fingering, are different from the cornemuse du Centre and allows quite different musical explorations.
