= Musette =

Musette may refer to:

== Music ==
- Musette (dance), a French baroque dance style; see list of classical music genres
- Musette de cour, or baroque musette, a musical instrument of the bagpipe family
- Musette bechonnet, a type of French bagpipe
- Musette bressane, a type of French bagpipe
- Oboe musette or piccolo oboe, the smallest member of the oboe family
- Suona, a type of Chinese sorna (double-reeded horn)
- Bal-musette, a style of French instrumental music and dance that first became popular in the 1880s
- Musette, a type of register switch on the accordion

== People ==
- Musette Brooks Gregory (1876–1921), African American suffragist and civil rights activist
- Musette Majendie (1903–1981), owner of Hedingham Castle
- Musette Satterfield Kitchin, American political hostess

== Other uses ==
- Musette (cycling), a small bag given to riders in a feed zone during a cycle race
- HMS Musette, the name of several ships
- Governor William W. and Musette Satterfield Kitchin House, a house in Roxboro, North Carolina
