= National Gaming Authority =

Agency overview
- Formed: 16 June 2020; 5 years ago
- Preceding agency: ARJEL
- Type: Independent administrative or public authority
- Jurisdiction: France
- Headquarters: 15th arrondissement of Paris
- Motto: At the service of a safe, honest and controlled game
- Employees: 350+ employees
- Agency executive: Isabelle Falque-Pierrotin, President
- Website: anj.fr

Map
- France in Europe

The French Autorité Nationale des Jeux (English: "National Gaming Authority"), usually referred to as ANJ, is an independent administrative authority, specifically designed to regulate online gambling in France. It was created by Article 34 of Law No 2010-476 of the 12 May 2010 (French Gambling Act) introduced to enhance the competition and sector regulation of gambling and online gaming.

== Members ==
The members of this authority are currently:

- Jean-François Vilotte, Chairman (appointed by the President of the Republic)
- Jean-Michel Brun (appointed by the President of the Republic)
- Alain Moulinier (appointed by the President of the Republic)
- Jean-Louis Valentin (replaced the resigned Guy Drut) (appointed by the President of the National Assembly)
- Dominique Laurent (appointed by the President of the National Assembly)
- Jean-Luc Pain (appointed by the President of the Senate)
- Laurent Sorbier (appointed by the President of the Senate)

The term of office of all members is six years and cannot be extended or renewed.

== Structure ==
In Article 35 of the French Gambling Act, it prescribes that ANJ should consist of:

1. A board of 7 members, chaired by a president
2. A disciplinary Committee of six representatives
3. Special Commissions (the Board may establish special commissions consisting of qualified persons in certain cases)

== Mission ==
The mission of ANJ is to:

- issue approvals and ensure compliance by operators
- protect the vulnerable and fight against addiction
- ensure the safety and fairness of gambling operations
- fight against illegal sites
- fight against fraud and money laundering

Currently only online operators offering sportsbooks betting, horse racing betting and poker games can get ANJ's license. At ANJ's site there's a list of approved operators and their websites. Also, a special section of the site is reserved for published decisions of the board (approvals and rejections).

In June 2010, ANJ contacted unlicensed gambling operators that accepted French players and requested that they stop doing so. That was the first step towards banning those sites that didn't get ANJ's approval and operated without licenses. Then organisation focused on blocking access to these sites rather than attempting to prosecute operators based overseas. It turned to French ISPs asking them to block the unlicensed sites in August, 2010. Despite the initial reluctance of ISPs to obey ANJ, the Tribunal de grande instance de Paris held that they must act towards preventing French gamblers from accessing such websites. The fine for the failure to block the domain was estimated at €10,000 per day. Although ANJ can fine the unlicensed operators (up to €100,000), it was more effective to act through ISPs.

== Proposed dissolution in 2020 and restructuring ==
ANJ's predecessor ARJEL was the subject of Parliamentary debate as to whether or not to it should be maintained. An amendment introduced by the deputy Jean-Luc Warsmann (LR) to the draft law on the general status of independent administrative authorities and public authorities aimed to dissolve ARJEL in February 2020. ARJEL was supposed to be merged with another entity or institution FDJ and the PMU.
