= Loure =

French Baroque dance

The loure, also known as the gigue lourée or gigue lente (slow gigue), is a French Baroque dance, probably originating in Normandy and named after the sound of the instrument of the same name (a type of musette). It is of slow or moderate tempo, sometimes in simple triple meter but more often in compound duple meter. The weight is on the first beat, a characteristic emphasised by the preceding anacrusis, which begins the traditional loure. Another feature is the lilting dotted rhythm.

In his Musicalisches Lexicon (Leipzig, 1732), Johann Gottfried Walther wrote that the loure "is slow and ceremonious; the first note of each half-measure is dotted which should be well observed".

Examples of loures are found in the works of Lully (e.g., Alceste), Rameau (e.g. Les Indes galantes) and of Bach (e.g.: French Suite No. 5 and the Partita No. 3 for violin solo).
