= Samponha =

The samponha or cornemuse des Pyrenées is a type of double-chantered, double-reeded bagpipe with a large bass drone, played in the Pyrenees mountains until the early 20th century.

== Sources ==
- Bagpipe World
