= Serinette =

French portable, hand-cranked pneumatic musical instrument

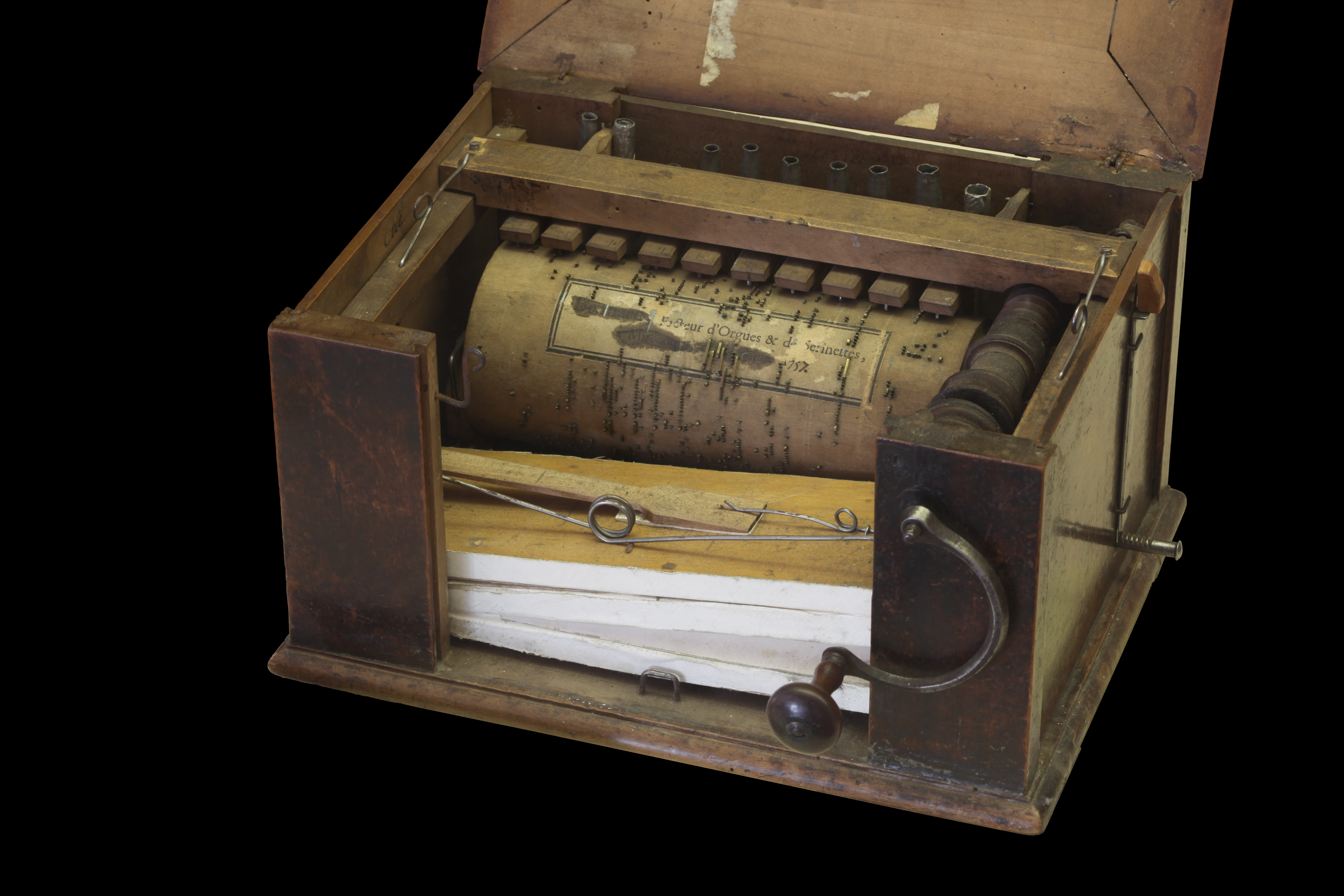
Serinette made by Bennard from Mirecourt, France, in 1757.

A serinette made after 1877 by Thibouville-Lamy in Mirecourt, France. Among the pieces this instrument plays is "Cloches de Corneville."

A serinette is a type of musical instrument, similar to a Perroquette, consisting of a small hand-cranked, pneumatic barrel organ. It appeared in the first half of the 18th century in eastern France, and was used to teach tunes to canaries. Its name is derived from the French serin, meaning "canary."

Serinettes are housed in a wooden case, normally of walnut, and typically measuring 265 mm (10.4 in) × 200 mm (7.9 in) × 150 mm (5.9 in). The instrument is played by turning a crank mounted on the front. The crank pumps a bellows to supply air to the pipes, and also turns a wooden barrel by means of gears. Driven into the barrel are brass pins and staples which encode the pieces of music. Mounted over the barrel is a bar carrying wooden keys connected to valves by vertical wooden rods. As the barrel turns, the pins and staples lift the keys, in turn opening valves which let air into the pipes, which are located at the rear of the instrument. Different tunes are selected by lifting the bar carrying the keys, then shifting the barrel along its length. This brings a different set of pins and staples in line with the keys.

Most serinettes contain one rank of ten metal pipes at 2' pitch and play eight different tunes. Each tune lasts about 20 seconds and is normally of quick tempo and contains considerable ornamentation. A paper label pasted inside the lid lists the tunes available; one of the most common was "La petite chasse."

Serinette construction was remarkably consistent. Instruments built a hundred years apart by different makers can bear a strong similarity. Many craftsmen worked in and around Mirecourt in the Lorraine region of France.

The sound of the serinette is similar to that of the piccolo.
