= Home Ball =

Home Ball Logo

Home Ball is a combination of three sports practices involving balls in a closed and target-equipped facility created in 2011. In each of these practices (Home Ball Handball, Home Ball Football and Home Ball Wheelchair), two teams compete against each other to score in the yellow targets of the opposing side in order to get more points than their opponent.

These emerging sports are aimed at a wide audience ranging from young people to seniors. The equipment is closed with the surface of the field relatively restricted.

== History ==
Home Ball was created in 2011 by Dominique Desbouillons, an inhabitant from the village of La Haye-Pesnel, France, based on an idea initially developed at his home for two years. It initially gave birth to two sports practices: the Home Ball Handball and the Home Ball Football. It was only a few years later that the practice of the Home Ball Wheelchair appeared.

Since then, Home Ball sports are practiced in all places, such as campsites, leisure parks, indoor and outdoor sports complexes and schools. Clubs began to emerge in France, competitions were organised and a federation was created.

== Equipment ==
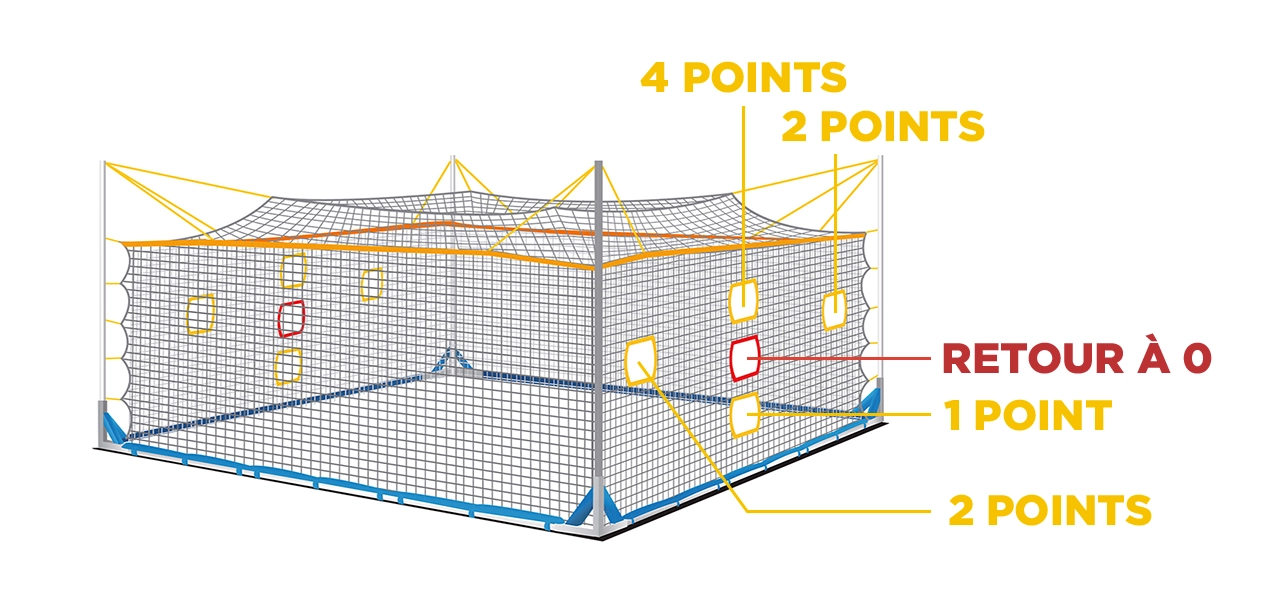
Home Ball Field with the value of cibles.

Home ball equipment is a net-enclosed terrain with two camps each having five targets (four yellow targets, one red target). The number of players in each team depends on the size of the Home Ball field used and the practice chosen. There are three dimensions of terrain : 4.50 x 4.50 m, 6.50 x 6.50 m, 8.50 x 8.50 m.

The official Home Ball balls used have been specially designed for practice.

== The three sports ==
=== Home Ball Handball ===
Home Ball Handball is inspired by handball, in which two teams compete with the objective of scoring more points than their opponents. The practice is played 2-on-2 in a field 4.50 x 4.50 m, 3-on-3 in a field 6.50 x 6.50 m and 4-on-4 in a field 8.50 x 8.50 m. Touching the ball with the foot is prohibited.

=== Home Ball Football ===
Home Ball Football is a sport inspired by football, in which two teams compete on foot with the goal of scoring more points than their opponents. The practice is played 1-on-1 in a field 4.50 x 4.50 m, 2-on-2 in a field 6.50 x 6.50 m and 3-on-3 in a field 8.50 x 8.50 m. The use of the ball by hand is prohibited.

=== Home Ball Wheelchair ===
The sport of the Home Ball Hand Armchair is inspired by handi basketball in which two teams compete with the objective to score more points than their opponent. The practice is 1:1 on a 4.50 x 4.50m, 2:2 on a 6.50 x 6.50m and 3:3 on an 8.50 x 8.50m. It is only played in wheelchairs to allow both the able-bodied and disabled people to practise together.

== Rules ==
- A match lasts 5 minutes, divided into two periods of 2 minutes and 30 seconds).
- The team must score as many points as possible in the yellow targets of the opposing side to win.
- The yellow target on top gives 4 points.
- Yellow side targets earn 2 points.
- The yellow target at the bottom gives 1 point.
- The red target returns the team’s last hit score to zero.
- Contact is prohibited.
- 5 seconds maximum ball in hand.
- Required pass before one can shoot for the engagement.
