= Muchosa =

Musical instrument

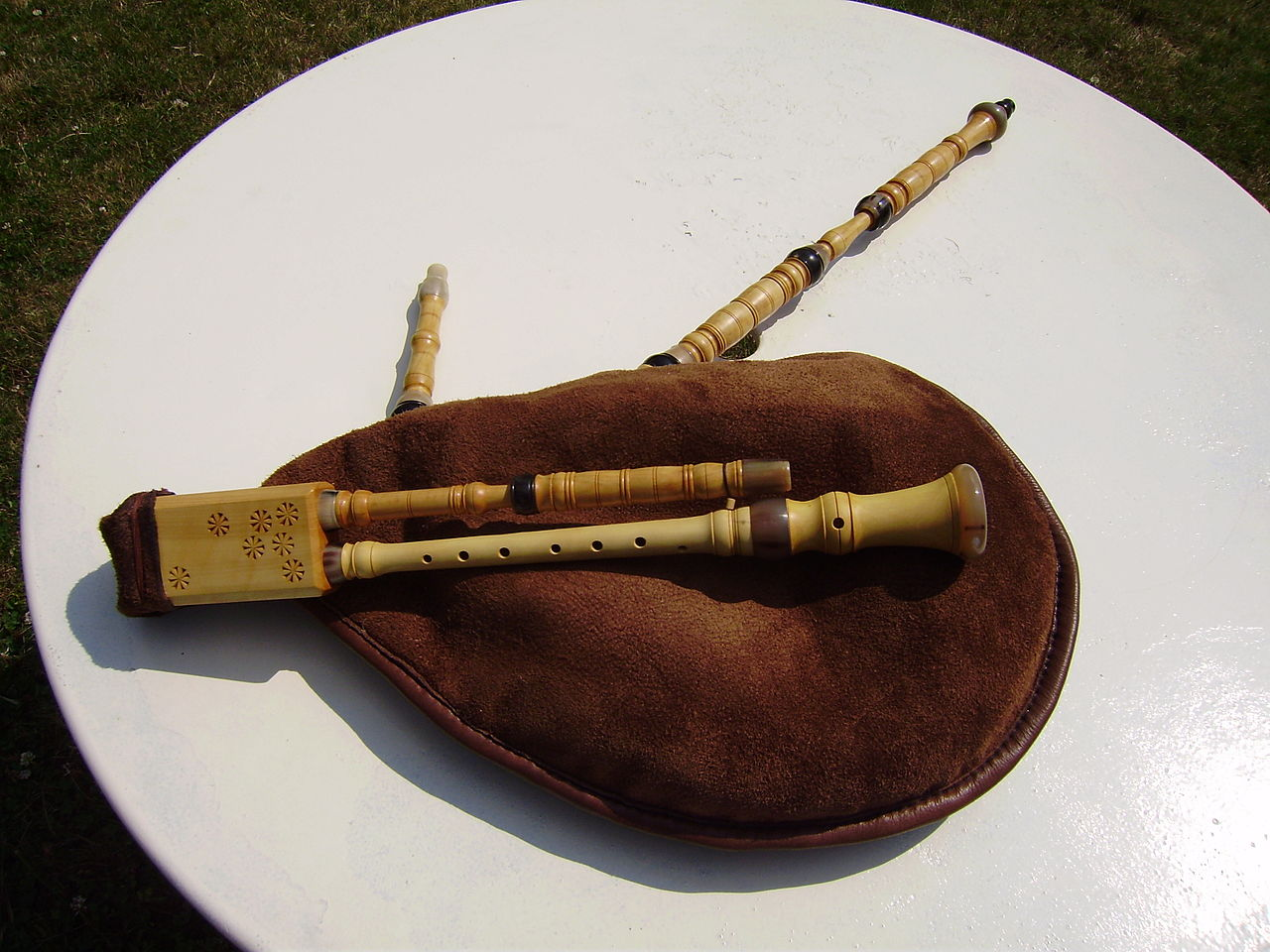

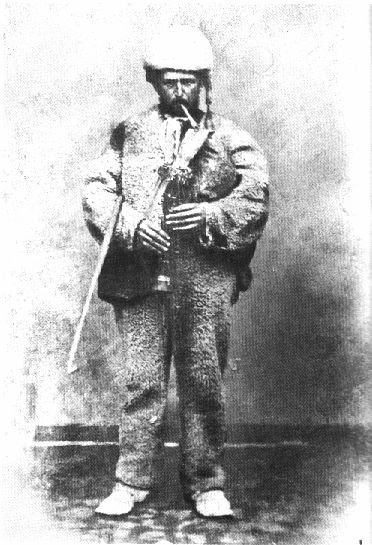
Alphonse Gheux, Wallonian piper

The muchosa is a type of bagpipe dating back to the late 13th century in Hainaut, Belgium and northern France, where it is known as the pipasso.

The muchosa has a chanter with a conical bore and double reed, pitched to B-flat. It has two single-reed drones. The treble drone is placed in a common stock with the chanter, and the bass drone is placed further back in its own stock, a feature common to other the musette style of bagpipe in central and northern France.

== Notable players ==
- Rémy Dubois
- Olle Geris
- Jean-Pierre Van Hees, Professor baroque musette & bagpipe at LUCA Muziek - Campus Lemmens
- Denis Laoureux
- Peter De Baets
- Bernard Vanderheyden
- Rémi Decker
- Jean Cayron
- Pol Ranson

Additionally to individual players, collectives of muchosa players such as La Confrèrie des Muchards de Saint-Druon, Amuséon, and Chés Pipasso Grinche Binde aim to promote this traditional instrument and make it sound again in various popular festive settings. The Pipasso International Festival (born in 2007 in Liomer) takes place on the last week-end of September every year at the Esplanade and Socio-Cultural Center du Chiffon Rouge in Flixecourt (Picardy, France).
