= Bousine =

Norman instrument

The bousine is a small, droneless bagpipe from the south of Normandy. It is of Saxon origin, and arrived in Normandy in the 13th Century.

Latinists believe its name comes from the Latin Bûcina : "trompette". However, it may also come from the Old Norse Bųss : "conduit/tuyau". This instrument is part of the family of Norman bagpipes, which also include the loure and the haute loure.
