= Gambling in France =

Gambling in France is legal. According to a 2022 TGM Research report, 49% of people in France participated in some form of betting in the 12 months prior to the report's data collection; the figure includes 28% who specifically bet on sports.

== History and contributions ==
The gambling industry in France has a very long history, and the country holds some of the oldest and most popular gambling establishments in the world. France has also contributed to the development of popular casino games. It was in France that the queen card became a permanent feature of the Blackjack deck, replacing the nobleman in the 16th century. In the 17th century, French mathematician Blaise Pascal invented the roulette wheel which later led to the introduction of the roulette game. Additionally, parimutuel betting has a French origin and was invented around 1870.

=== Early casino development and Napoleonic regulation ===
To contain gambling within narrow limits and reserve it for social exclusivity, Napoleon issued the decree of June 24, 1806, which prohibited all houses of games of chance throughout the Empire, but made two exceptions: Article 4 stipulated "Our Minister of Police will make particular regulations for places where mineral waters exist during the water season only, and for the city of Paris." Through derogations, establishments were born in tourist resorts other than thermal spas, particularly seaside resorts.

The first modern casinos in the 19th century were often wooden shacks dismantled at the beginning and end of each season, essentially devoted to therapeutic purposes, hence their location in the heart of tourist resorts (initially thermal spas where nobility and bourgeoisie went to "take the waters"). As usage multiplied and owners desired to display prestige, proprietors moved toward architectural follies representing buildings of ostentatious display in these places of social distinction.

=== First casino establishments ===
The first casino was established in 1822 in Dieppe, designed by architect Pierre Châtelain with the Count of Brancas, sub-prefect of the city who led the project. Casino activities truly began from 1834. In 1823, the Hôtel Guilland was built in Aix-les-Bains with the ambition of becoming a casino, achieved with the inaugural of the Casino Grand-Cercle in 1849.

A second casino was established in 1825 in Boulogne-sur-Mer, with the construction by Auguste Versial and engineer Marguet of the Palace of Neptune (housing both the casino and sea baths). Subsequently, the cities of Saint-Malo in 1839, Trouville in 1845, and Pornic in 1853 successively established the first casinos in France.

While more casino projects appeared in seaside and thermal cities, gaming houses in Paris were closed in 1837.

=== Legislative framework development ===
The law of June 15, 1907, regulating gambling in circles and casinos in seaside, thermal and climatic resorts, reserved these establishments for an affluent clientele "enjoying time freed from work constraints while preventing the more modest from squandering their moral and industrious capital." The 1919 law prohibited games of chance within a 100 km (62 mi) radius around Paris, but extended the 1907 authorizations to tourist resorts. The law of March 31, 1931, authorized thermal resorts located less than 100 km from Paris to have a casino, allowing the reopening of the Enghien-les-Bains casino, located just 20 km (12 mi) from the capital.

In 1987, the minimum gambling age in France was lowered from 21 to 18. Slots machines became legal in 1988 after previously being banned.

The ARJEL, the National Gaming Authority, is responsible for regulating the gambling industry in France. There are also two operators that hold a monopoly in the country. Française des Jeux (FDJ) benefits from a state monopoly until 2044 for lottery games (both online and offline) and offline sports betting, while Pari Mutuel Urbain (PMU) benefits from a state monopoly for offline horse betting. In 2010, France legalized online gambling as well, including online sports betting.

== Casino regulation and industry ==
=== Current casino regulation ===
In France, casino operations are reserved for seaside, thermal and climatic resorts, as well as the main tourist city of agglomerations of more than 500,000 inhabitants with an artistic scene (theater, opera, etc.) funded for more than 40% by the agglomeration. Casino operation is a regulated profession under the dual supervision of the Ministry of the Interior and the Ministry of Budget (Finance).

Gaming authorizations are granted by the Ministry of the Interior after approval by the local territorial authority, implementation of public service delegation procedures, and public inquiry. The authorization is temporary and renewable, with a maximum duration of 5 years. All casino staff must be approved by the Ministry of the Interior, and the minimum age for casino admission is 18 years.

=== Economic data and market concentration ===
According to the Ministry of the Interior, gross gaming revenue reached €2.65 billion for the 2004-2005 season, declining to €2.25 billion for 2015-2016. In 2023, there were 202 casinos in France (195 in metropolitan France and 7 overseas). The sector is highly concentrated, with 90% of companies controlled by groups in 2011, and the four largest groups generating three-quarters of total revenue.

=== Major casino groups ===
As of 2016, France's 200 casinos are primarily controlled by:

- Groupe Partouche: 38 casinos
- Groupe Joa: 33 casinos
- Groupe Lucien Barrière: 30 casinos
- Groupe Tranchant: 16 casinos
- Others and independents: 83 casinos

The largest casino by revenue is Enghien-les-Bains with €157 million (2011 figures), owned by Groupe Lucien Barrière.

== Remote gambling ==
The first steps toward the legalization of remote gambling in France were made in 2005 when the European Commission started to investigate the French gambling market. In 2006, the Commission gave a notice and then requested in 2007 to make amends to existing law in compliance with European Union (EU) laws. As a result, in 2009, the French government introduced a bill that partially opened the gambling market to operators from other EU countries.

However, the Remote Gambling Association criticized the main provisions of bill for offering unfavorable conditions for new operators as opposed to incumbent state-owned operators. The main lines of criticism included its limited range of gambling services that can be offered by operators, its unfavorable taxing regime, its low payouts for players, and its stringent requirements like the necessity to keep gambling servers in the territory of France.

The Law n° 2010-476 of May 12, 2010, regarding the introduction of competition and sector regulation of gambling and online gambling, is often referred to as the French Gambling Act. It was put into effect on May 13, 2010 and subsequently opened the online gambling market in France; it also created ARJEL to regulate the industry. Three other regulating authorities were also imbued with powers to regulate the gambling industry: the French Competition Authority (ADLC), the Independent Authority to Protect Audiovisual Communication Freedom (CSA), and the Commission Nationale de L'informatique et Des Libertés (CNIL).

Since then, there have been three types of licenses corresponding to the three types of online gambling activities allowed by the French gambling law:

- Online sports betting (live betting, pool betting, and fixed odds betting)
- Online horse race betting (pool betting)
- Online poker games (Texas Hold'em Limit, Texas Hold'em Pot Limit, Texas Hold'em No Limit, and Omaha Hold'em)

Casino games of chance, as well as spread betting and betting exchange, are prohibited as the lawmakers considered them too addictive. Although poker is one of the games frequently played at casinos, it remains legal because it is considered a game of skill, where the outcomes depend on the skills of players who can alternate their strategies depending on each game's situation.

Online gambling in France was legalized shortly before 2010 FIFA World Cup. As a result, gamblers opened over 1.2 million accounts on licensed sites in the first month. Altogether, they bet €83 million which was almost twice as much in money than the same period in 2009; back then, the only option for legal online betting was via state-owned betting websites.

=== Online casino regulation ===
The "Autorité nationale des jeux" (ANJ) has extended its regulatory scope to include online casino supervision, ensuring compliance with laws and protecting vulnerable players while preventing addiction and fraud.
