= Perroquette =

The perroquette is a mechanical musical instrument related to the serinette, the merline, and the barrel organ.

== Manufacture ==
Many of these small, portable mechanical organs were made in Mirecourt, (Vosges) by organ and serinette makers such as Louis Léopold Bourdot Boban, Jean-Baptiste Payonne, Nicolas Poirot, and Delor-Pacherelle.

Perroquette by Delor-Pacherelle (Mirecourt)

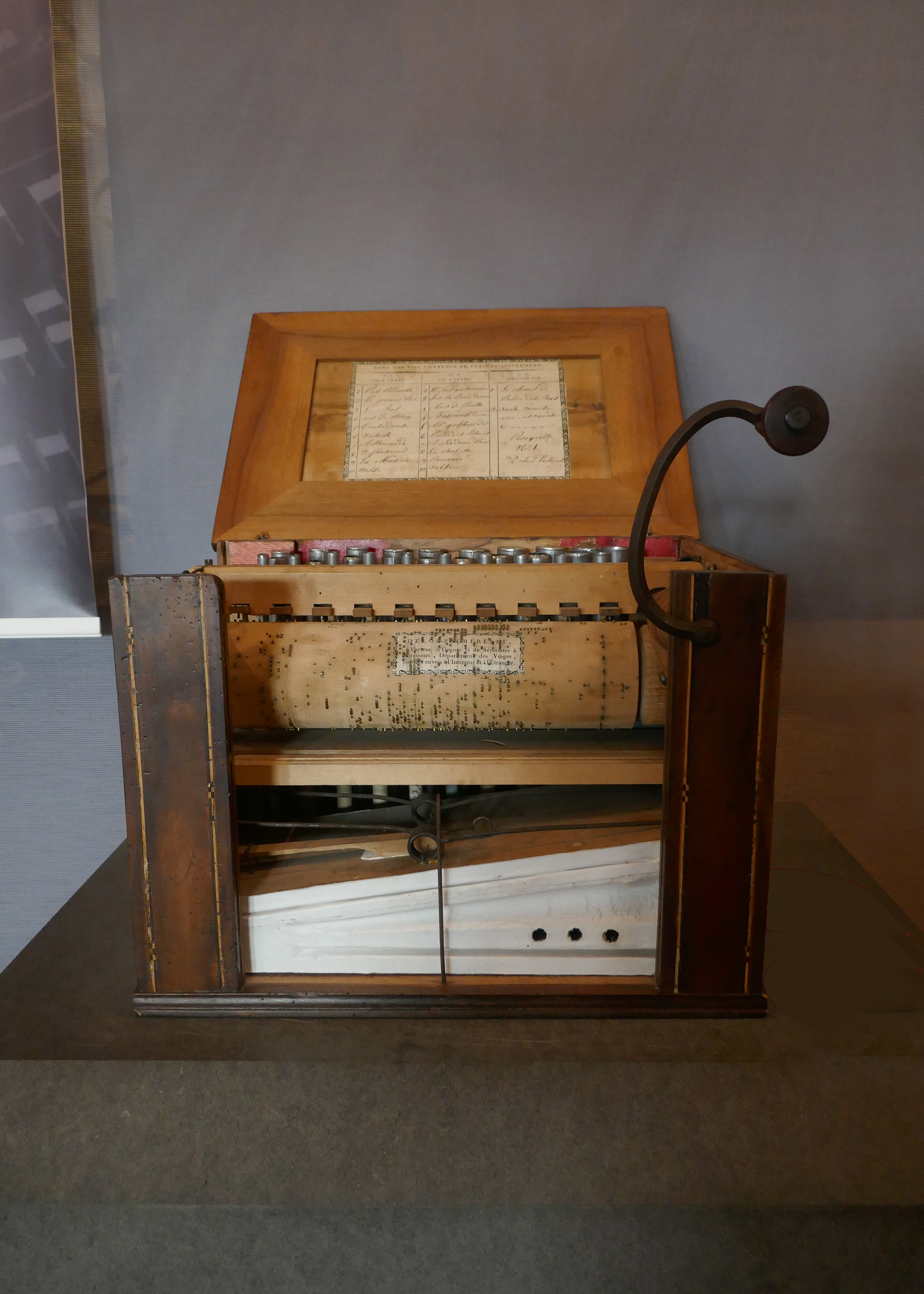
Perroquette open.

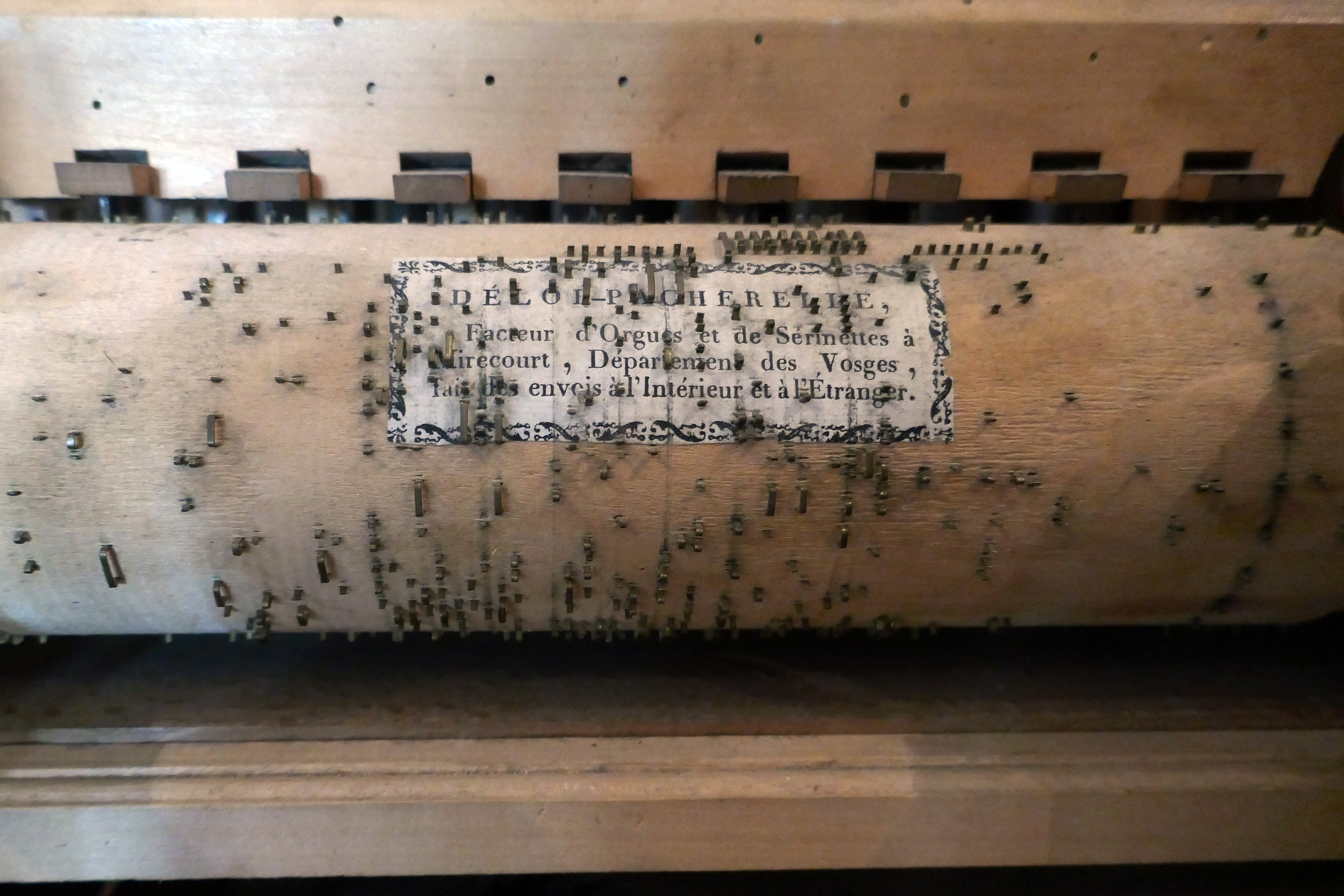
Pin barrel.

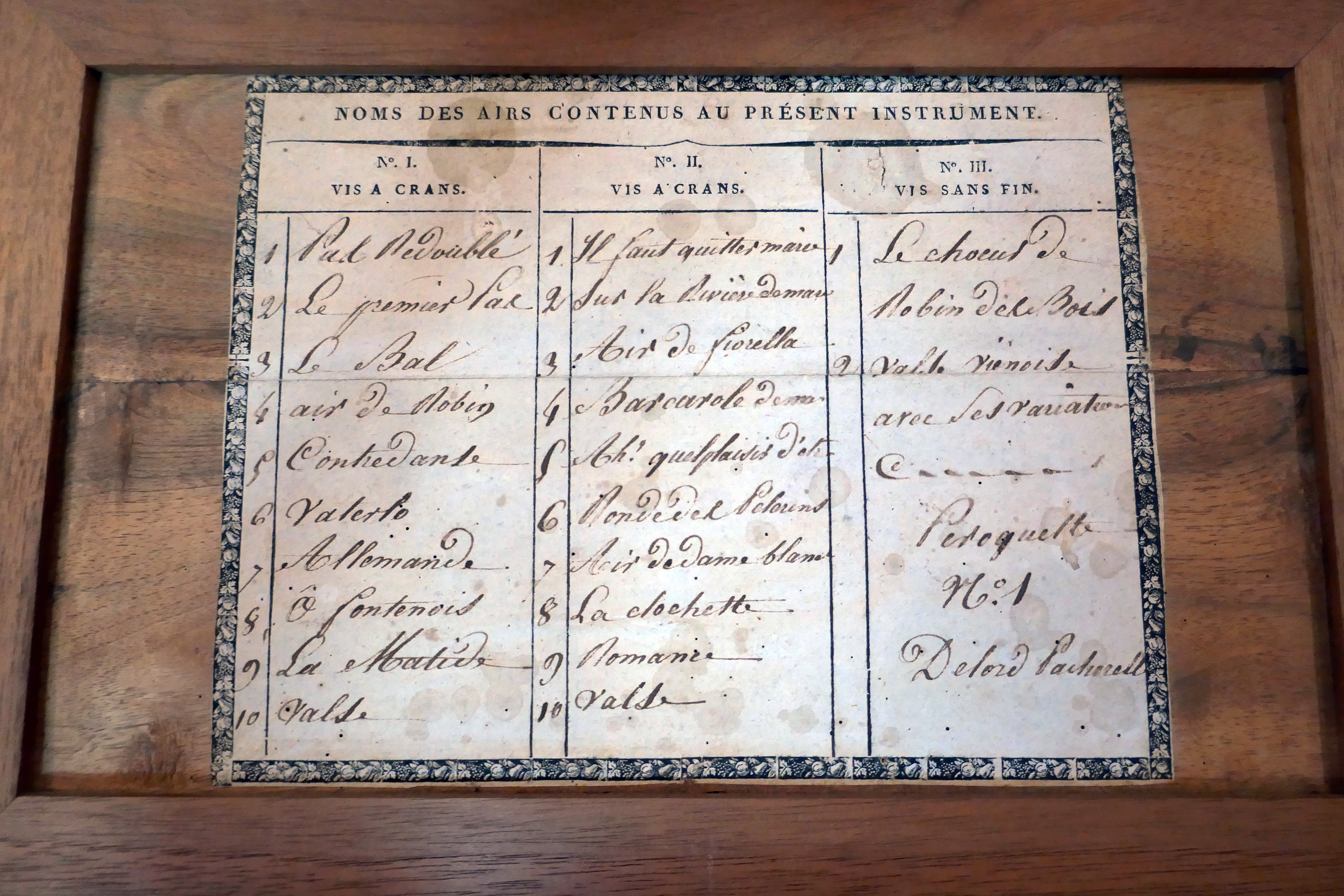
Names of the pieces.

== Bibliography ==
- Alice Julien-Laferrière, Les oiseaux imitateurs et leur éducation musicale aux CXVII/XVIII (tr. "Imitative birds and their musical training in the C17/C18"), n.d., 36 p.
- Helmut Zeraschi, L'orgue de Barbarie et autres instruments mécaniques, (tr. "The barrel organ and other mechanical instruments") Payot, Lausanne, 1980, 251 p. ISBN 2-601-00392-8
