= Pipasso =

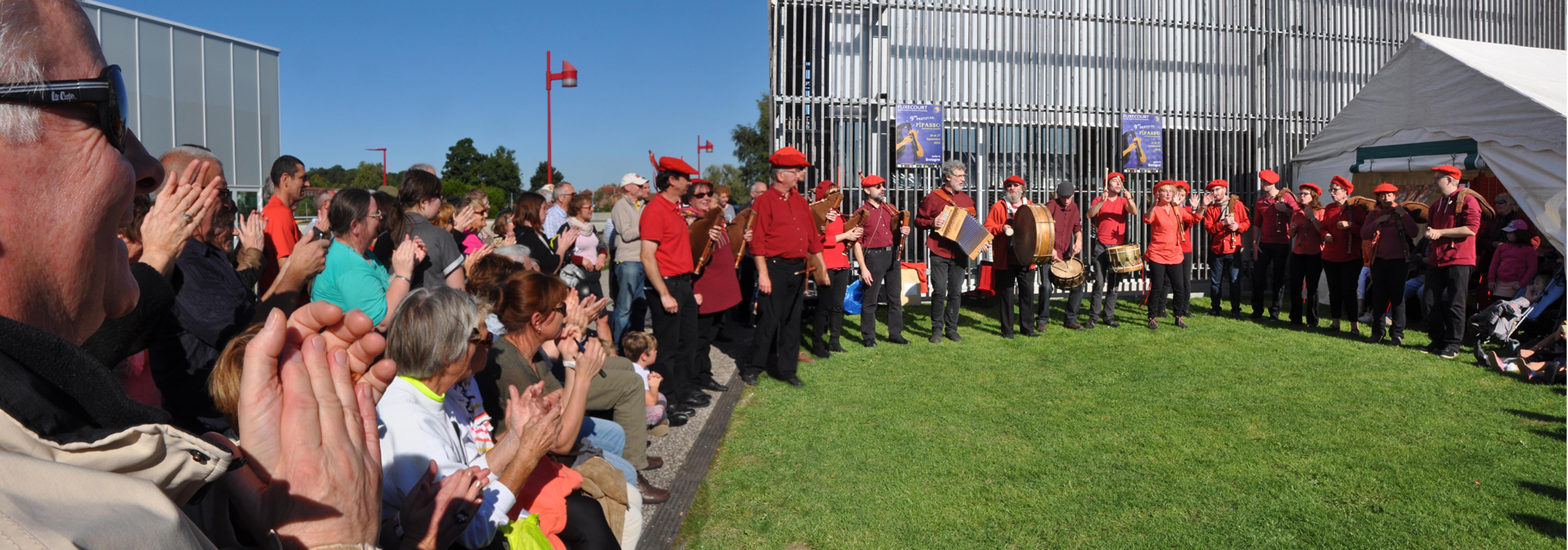
The pipassoneurs at the 2015 Pipasso festival

The pipasso is a type of bagpipe found in northern France and Belgium. It is commonly called the "Picardy bagpipe". In the Belgian province of Hainaut, it is also known as the muchosa.

== History ==
The pipasso was traditionally played by shepherds in festival processions, and was often played alongside popular instruments such as the hurdy-gurdy and the fiddle. However, by the 1700s, it had largely been replaced by the fiddle and by bass instruments.

There are a few outliers in the tradition that continued on beyond the 1700s. Unfortunately, no recordings of the last living players (who were mostly shepherds and beggars living in the 1900s) exist, and scarce information survives about the typical repertoire a pipasso player would have been able to perform. The historical models that have been preserved have a one-octave range.

== Construction ==
According to the eighth volume of the Garland Encyclopedia of World Music, illustrations dating back to the 1300s and 1400s suggest that the instrument consisted of a simple bag made from a bladder, as well as a single-piece, often conical, chanter. These illustrations did not include a drone. By the 1450s–1550s, the most common model of the pipasso was made from a sewn bag, a one-piece conical chanter, and also included a two-jointed bass drone (see bagpipes for technical definition of drones as they pertain to musical instruments).

In the second half of the 16th century, another German model came into existence. In this particular model, a second drone (tenor) was added below the bass drone. The single surviving model is currently held in the Kunsthistorisches Museum in Vienna, Austria.

By the 1700s–1800s, despite the beginnings of its ultimate decline and near disappearance, yet another model with a slightly different configuration had been created. The bass drone rested upright on the shoulder, while the tenor drone would have been in a parallel formation in the same stock (the socket that attaches the pipe to the bag itself; see: bagpipes) as the chanter. There are currently three extant samples of this model in the Musical Instrument Museum in Brussels, Belgium.

== Modern usage ==
Though documentation of the instrument dates back as far as the fourteenth century, today very little information about the pipasso circulates among the public and the academic realm of music studies. However, several groups are working to make the instrument visible and known to the general public, including Amuséon and ch'Pipasso Greench Binde. A revival movement for the instrument began in the 1970s and continues today.

There is an annual Pipasso festival (Le Festival du Pipasso) that is held in Flixecourt, Northern France. The 13th edition will take place from 27 September to 29 September 2019.

== See also ==
- Bagpipes
- Hurdy-gurdy
- Muchosa
