= Graïle =

Musical instrument

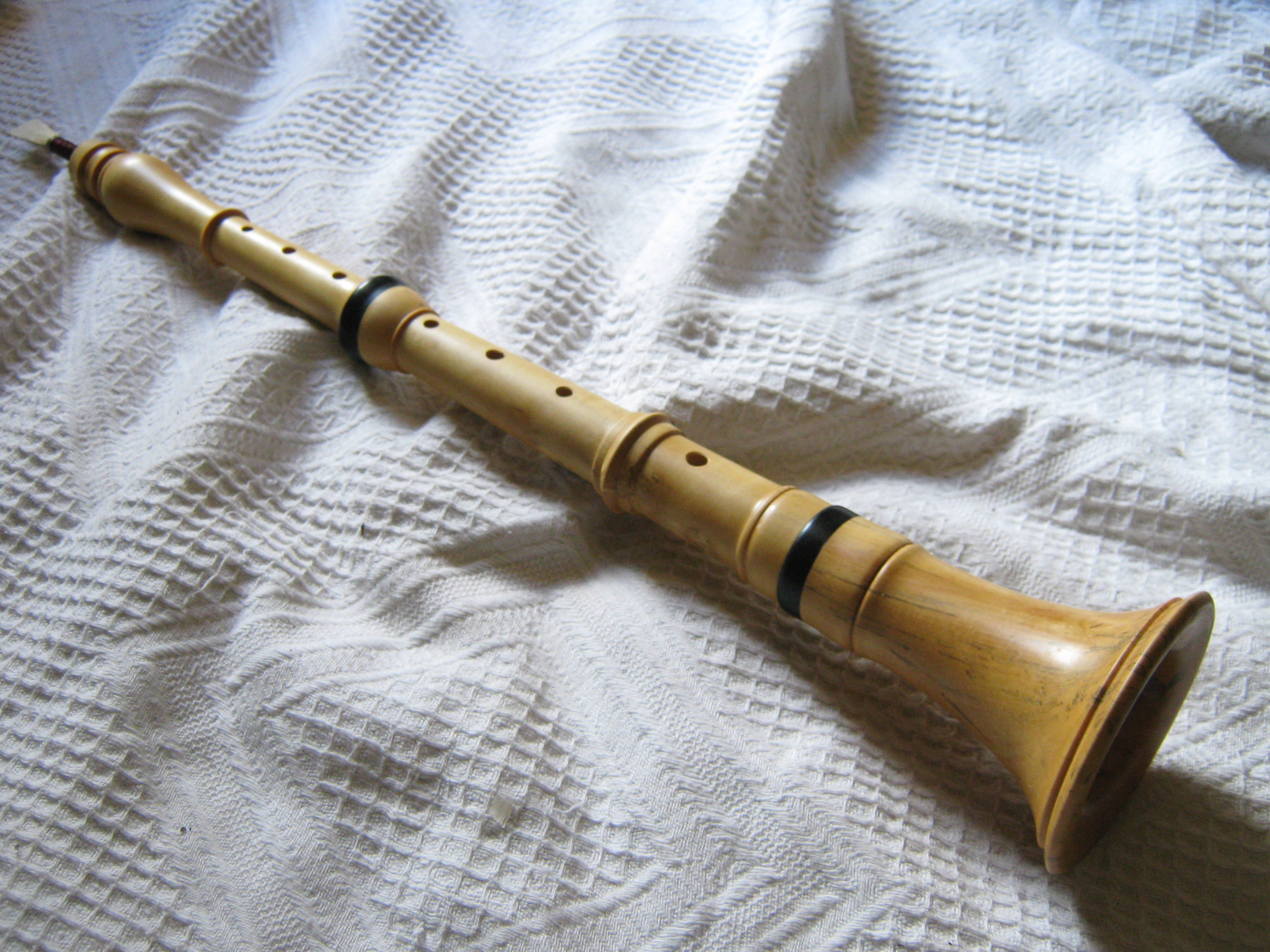
A graïle

The graïle, (or Occitan graile) is a woodwind instrument of Languedoc, France, resembling a oboe. It is played in Monts de Lacaune (in the department of Tarn) and surrounding areas including Bezime.

== Details ==
The instrument consists of three turned wooden parts reinforced at the joints with horn.

== Playing ==
The graïle uses a double reed, the caramèla.
