= Bodega (bagpipe) =

French bagpipe

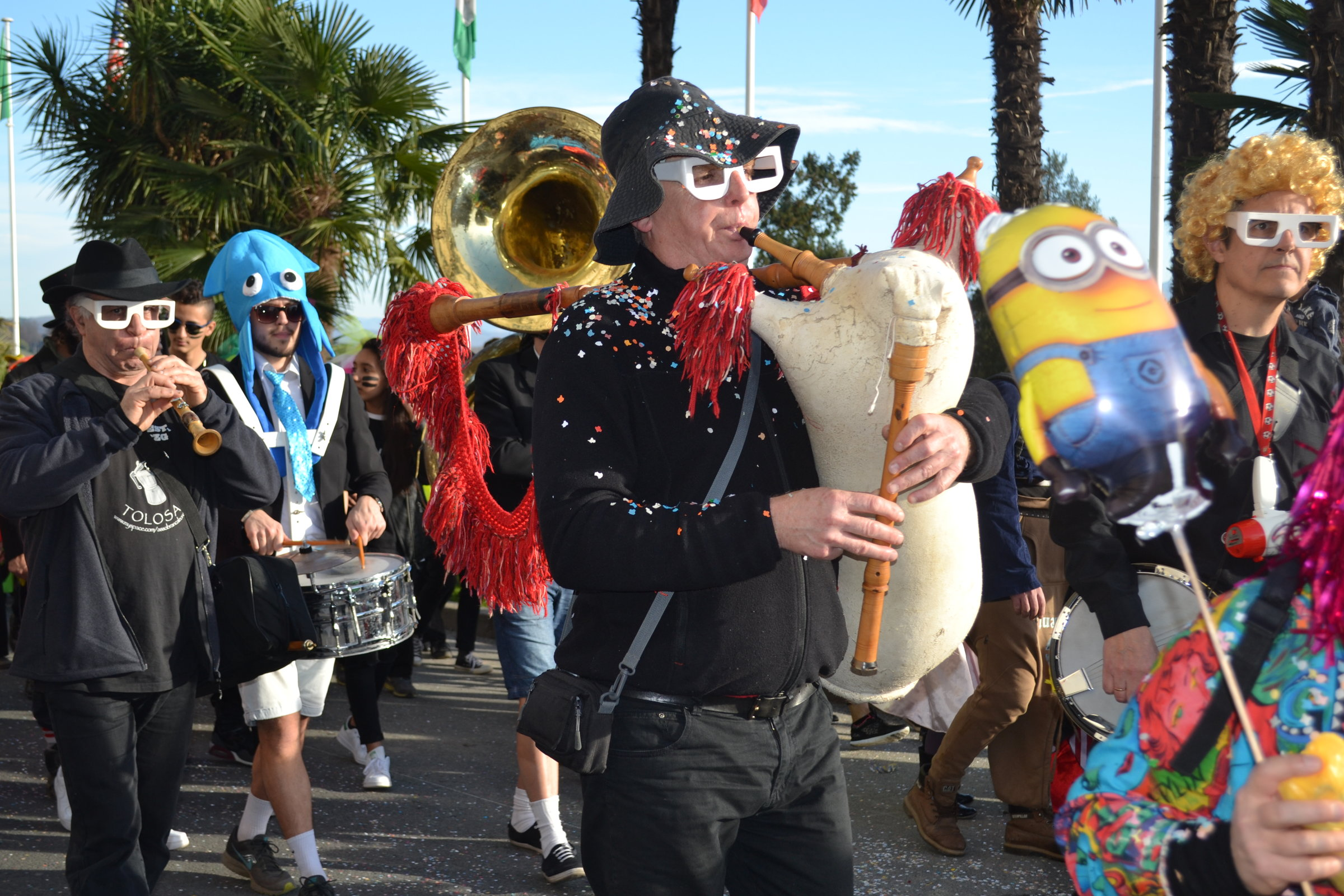
Bodega player during Carnaval Biarnés

Bodega or craba is an Occitan term for a type of French bagpipe played in Montagne Noire, particularly within the French departments of Tarn, Aude, Hérault, and Haute-Garonne. It is also the name given to outdoor bars or cellars with festive music during ferias.

== Construction ==
The bag is generally of goatskin (or sometimes sheepskin) in which are set wooden stocks to hold the pipes, generally of boxwood. The pipes include:

- blowpipe (bufet) through which air is blown into the bag
- chanter (graile) on which the melody is played, using a double-reed
- drone (bonda) which sounds a continuous harmonising note. The drone rests on the shoulder of the player, and uses a single reed
