= Musette bressane =

The musette bressane (or mezeta, mus'ta, voire cabrette, brette or tchievra) is a type of bagpipe native to the historic French province of Bresse, in eastern France.

The instrument consists of one chanter with a double reed and conical bore, a high drone set in the same stock (which may have a single, or rarely a double, reeded drone), and a large bass drone with a single reed.

These bagpipes are currently generally bellows-blown, though their predecessors prior to 1800 were mouth-blown.

== Sources ==
- (in French)
