= Cabrette =

Type of bagpipe from France

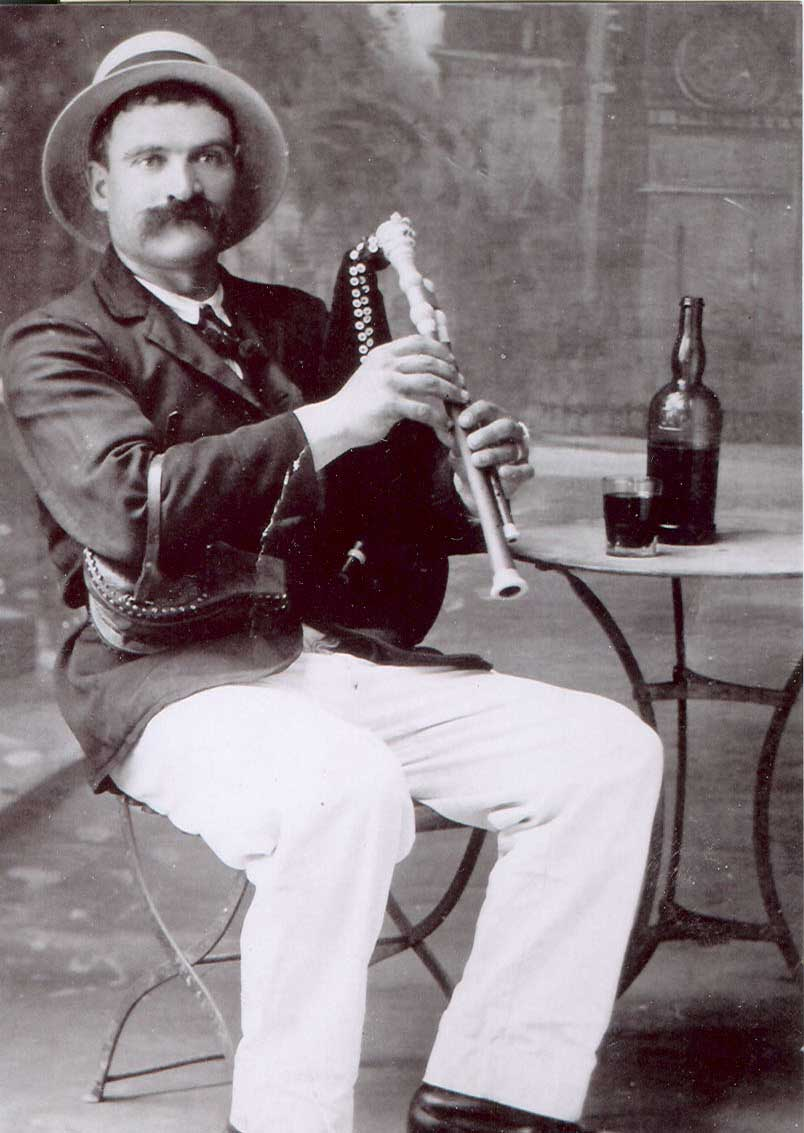
Cabrette player Jean Rascalou

The cabrette (French: literally "little goat", alternately musette) is a type of bagpipe which appeared in Auvergne, France, in the 19th century, and rapidly spread to Haute-Auvergne and Aubrac.

== Details ==
The cabrette comprises a chanter for playing the melody and a drone, but the latter is not necessarily functional. Though descended from earlier mouth-blown bagpipes, bellows were added to the cabrette in the mid-19th century. It is said that Joseph Faure, of Saint-Martin-de-Fugères en Haute-Loire, first applied a bellows to the cabrette. Faure, a carpenter stricken with lung disease, was inspired when he used a bellows to start a fire.

== See also ==
- Chabrette, a similarly named bagpipe used in the Limousin region of central France

== Sources ==
- Dedicated cabrette site
