= Chabrette =

Type of bagpipe

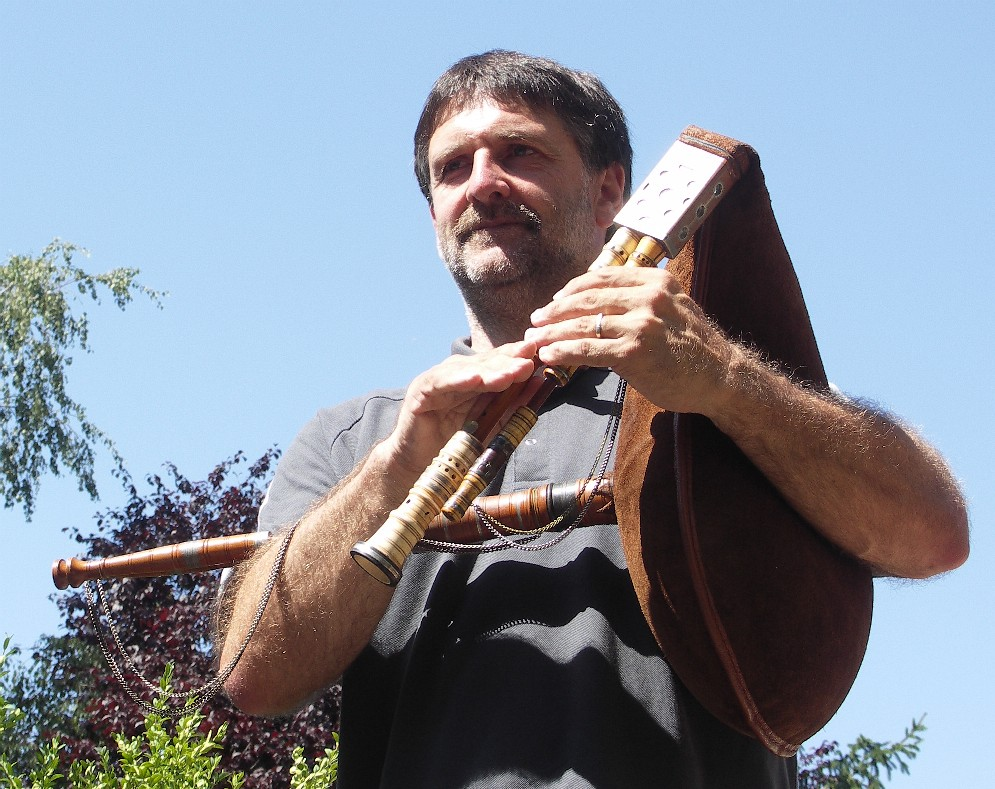

The chabrette or chabrette limousine (chabreta in Occitan Limousin) is a type of bagpipe native to the Limousin region of central France.

In Périgord, there is a pipe locally known as the chabrette which shares many features with the chabrette limousine (boîtier à miroir, hautbois à pavillon, materials, etc.), but also several distinct differences (petite taille donc tonalité aigüe, bourdon latéral à l'unisson du petit bourdon) which distinguish it from its "big sister" of Limousin.

The cabrette auvergnate (generally made in Paris currently) gradually replaced the native bagpipe in Limousin and other areas of the Massif Central. The musette berrichonne was played in the northeast of Limousin, in Creuse. Other bagpipes, locally made or imported, are played throughout the region.

== Playing ==
Main field researches have been conducted from 1975 to nowadays by ethnomusicologist and chabrette player Eric Montbel, and by the makers Claude Girard and Thierry Boisvert. A significant step for the modern survival of the chabrette occurred in 1987, when the Department of Traditional Music of the Regional Conservatory of Limoges undertook to promote the teaching of the chabrette repertory, and in 2003 formed the musical ensemble "Couleur Chabrette".

== Discography ==
- Chabretaires à Ligoure - CRMT Limousin
- Vive la Musique Traditionnelle - Couleur Chabrette
- Un tot pitit bocin - Philippe "Rando"" Randonneix
- Chabretas, les cornemuses à miroirs du Limousin - CD Al Sur. Eric Montbel

== See also ==
- Cornemuse du Centre
- Cabrette
