= Musette bechonnet =

Bagpipes from France

The musette bechonnet is a type of bellows-blown French bagpipe which takes its name from its creator, Joseph Bechonnet (1820-1900 AD) of Effiat.

The musette bechonnet typically has three drones, and its hide bag covered by an ornamented cloth bag.
