= Cornemuse du Centre =

French bagpipe

The cornemuse du Centre France (or musette du Centre) (bagpipes of Central France) is a type of bagpipes native to Central France. They have two drones, one an octave, one two octaves, below the tonic of the chanter. They can be found in the Bourbonnais, Berry, Nivernais, and Morvan regions of France and in different tonalities.

== Construction ==
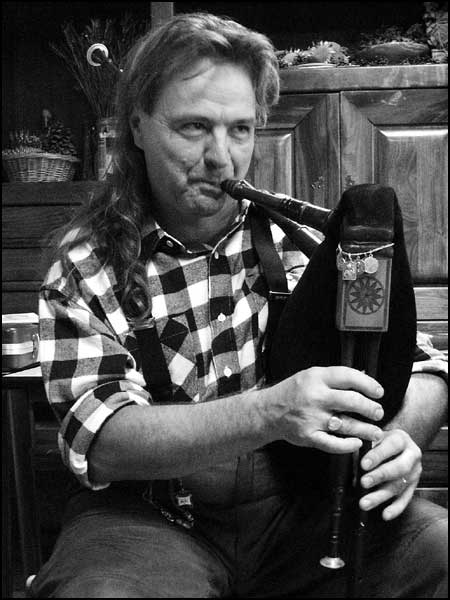
Musette du Centre

The drones consist of tubes of wood (two for the small drone, three for the larger) that telescope into one another to tune the instrument. The drones have single reeds. The chanter is equipped with a double reed of reed or plastic.

The chanter can be in a wide variety of keys, depending on its length:

- 6 inches (Upper G)
- 10 inches (Upper D)
- 11 inches (Upper C)
- 14 inches (A)
- 16 inches (G)
- 18 inches (F)
- 20 inches (D)
- 23 inches (C)
- 24 inches (A#)
- 26 inches (A)
- 30 inches (Lower G)

== Famous players ==
- Eric Montbel
- Jean Blanchard
- Robert Amyott
- Julien Barbances

== Playing ==
The cornemuse du centre is a chromatic instrument, on most modern instruments all semitones of the scale can be played. The instrument is (generally) not tuned to an equal temperament, to allow playing in harmony with the drones. Also, due to the presence of the drones which cannot be tuned to another pitch, only a subset of the keys which would be technically feasible are usually played, i.e. the drone is either the key's tonic or the dominant. Further, typically used embellishments do not work as well or not at all if the music is transposed to another key. As most semitones can be played, music in different modes of a key can be and are traditionally played (e.g. on a cornemuse du centre 20p: D-major, D-minor, D-mixolydian etc.), which would not be possible on a purely diatonic instrument.

The fingering of the chanter is usually semi-closed for high pitched instruments, which means that the fingers of the lower hand (which is usually the right hand) are placed on their holes when removing the fingers of the upper hand. Chanters of 20 inches or greater are generally played with open fingering.
