= Loure (bagpipe) =

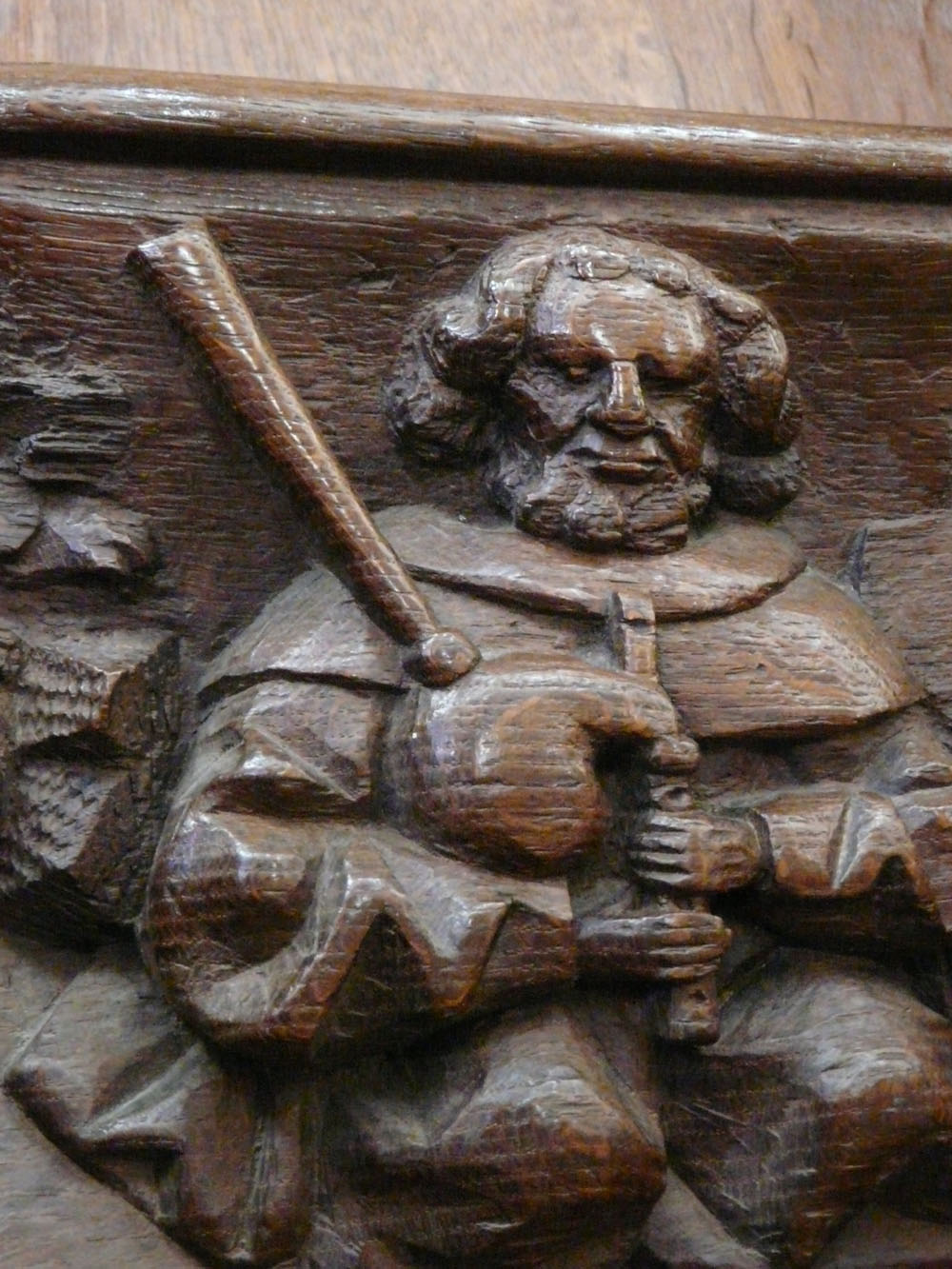
Loure, collégiale Saint-Évroult de Mortain, 15^{e} s.

The loure is a type of bagpipe native to Normandy, popular in the 17th and 18th centuries but later extinct prior to its modern revival.

There was also a larger version known as the haute loure.
