= List of Roman Catholic archbishops of Paris =

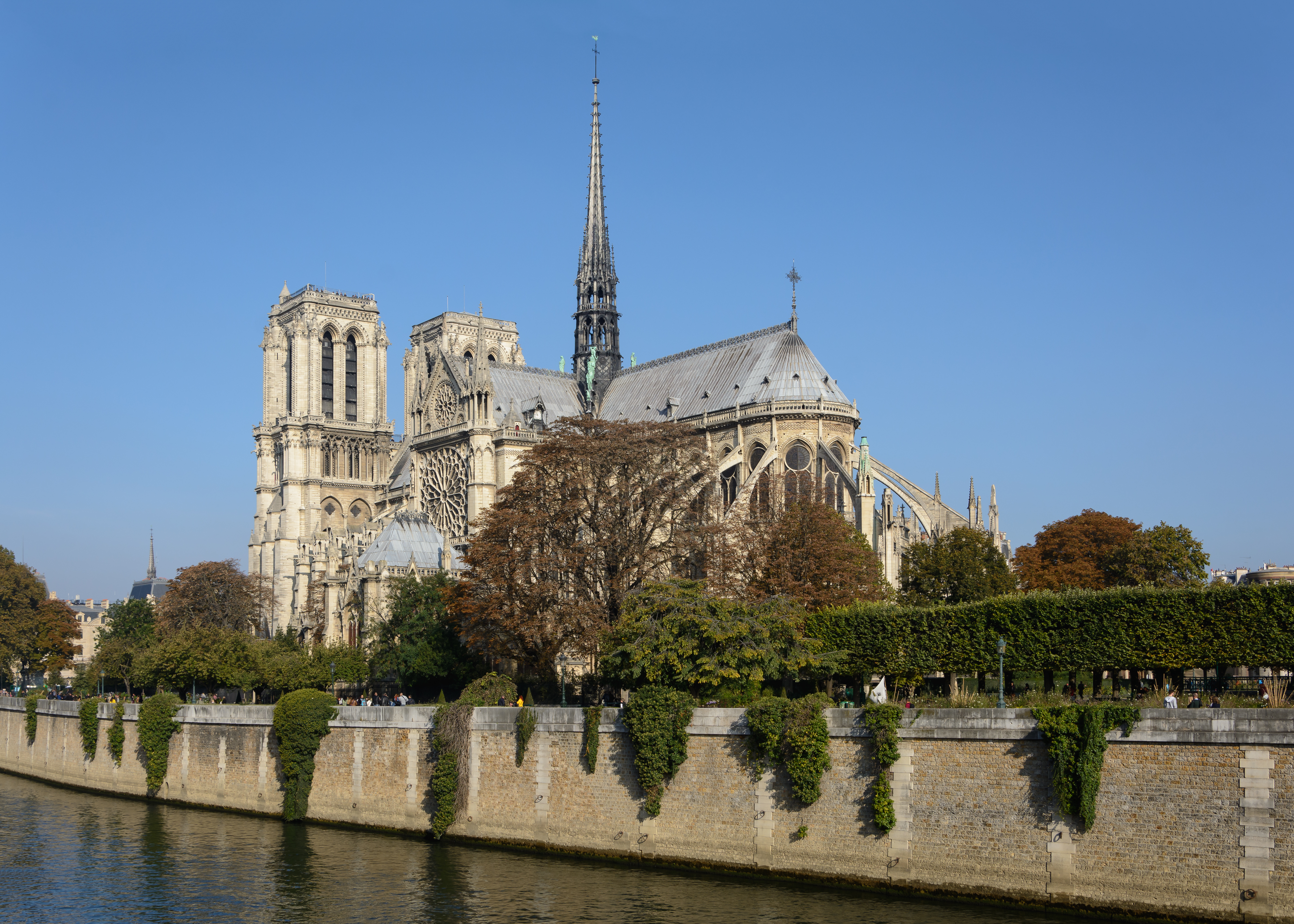
Notre-Dame de Paris is the seat of the archbishop of Paris

The archbishop of Paris is the head of the Roman Catholic Archdiocese of Paris. As the archdiocese is the metropolitan see of the ecclesiastical province encompassing the Île-de-France region, the archbishop of Paris also administers the bishops who head the suffragan dioceses of Créteil, Evry-Corbeil-Essonnes, Meaux, Nanterre, Pontoise, Saint-Denis and Versailles. The current archbishop is Laurent Ulrich.

The diocese of Paris was erected in the 3rd century. It was elevated to its current status in 1622. Since then there have been 30 archbishops of Paris, with Jean-François de Gondi being the first.

== Archbishops of Paris ==
Key
‡	Denotes archbishop who was a cardinal during their episcopate
O.M.I.	Missionary Oblates of Mary Immaculate
P.S.S.	Society of the Priests of Saint Sulpice

Portrait	Bishop	Episcopate	Duration	Pope (Note: The pope at the time of the bishop's appointment.)	Ref.
	Jean-François de Gondi	14 November 1622 – 21 March 1654	31 years, 127 days	Gregory XV	
	Jean François Paul de Gondi^{‡}	21 March 1654 – 15 February 1662	7 years, 331 days	Urban VIII (Note: Appointed as coadjutor archbishop)	
	Pierre de Marca	5 June 1662 – 29 June 1662	24 days	Alexander VII	
	Hardouin de Péréfixe de Beaumont	24 March 1664 – 1 January 1671	6 years, 283 days	Alexander VII	
	François de Harlay de Champvallon	23 February 1671 – 6 August 1695	24 years, 164 days	Clement X	
	Louis Antoine de Noailles^{‡}	19 September 1695 – 4 May 1729	33 years, 227 days	Innocent XII	
	Charles-Gaspard-Guillaume de Vintimille du Luc	17 August 1729 – 13 March 1746	16 years, 208 days	Benedict XIII	
	Jacques-Bonne Gigault de Bellefonds	2 May 1746 – 20 July 1746	79 days	Benedict XIV	
	Christophe de Beaumont	19 September 1746 – 12 December 1781	35 years, 84 days	Benedict XIV	
	Antoine-Éléonor-Léon Leclerc de Juigné	25 February 1782 – 31 January 1802	19 years, 340 days	Pius VI	
	Jean-Baptiste de Belloy^{‡}	10 April 1802 – 10 June 1808	6 years, 61 days	Pius VII	
	Alexandre Angélique de Talleyrand-Périgord^{‡}	1 October 1817 – 20 October 1821	4 years, 19 days	Pius VII	
	Hyacinthe-Louis de Quélen	20 October 1821 – 31 December 1839	18 years, 72 days	Pius VII	
	Denis Auguste Affre	13 July 1840 – 27 June 1848	7 years, 350 days	Gregory XVI	
	Marie-Dominique-Auguste Sibour	11 September 1848 – 3 January 1857	8 years, 114 days	Pius IX	
	François Nicholas Madeleine Morlot^{‡}	19 March 1857 – 29 December 1862	5 years, 285 days	Pius IX	
	Georges Darboy	16 March 1863 – 24 May 1871	8 years, 69 days	Pius IX	
	Joseph-Hippolyte Guibert, O.M.I.^{‡}	27 October 1871 – 8 July 1886	14 years, 254 days	Pius IX	
	François-Marie-Benjamin Richard^{‡}	8 July 1886 – 28 January 1908	21 years, 204 days	Pius IX	
	Léon-Adolphe Amette^{‡}	28 January 1908 – 29 August 1920	12 years, 214 days	Pius X	
	Louis-Ernest Dubois^{‡}	13 September 1920 – 23 September 1929	9 years, 10 days	Benedict XV	
	Jean Verdier, P.S.S.^{‡}	18 November 1929 – 9 April 1940	10 years, 143 days	Pius XI	
	Emmanuel Célestin Suhard^{‡}	11 May 1940 – 30 May 1949	9 years, 19 days	Pius XII	
	Maurice Feltin^{‡}	15 August 1949 – 1 December 1966	17 years, 108 days	Pius XII	
	Pierre Veuillot^{‡}	1 December 1966 – 14 February 1968	1 year, 75 days	John XXIII	
	François Marty^{‡}	26 March 1968 – 31 January 1981	12 years, 311 days	Paul VI	
	Jean-Marie Lustiger^{‡}	31 January 1981 – 11 February 2005	24 years, 11 days	John Paul II	
	André Vingt-Trois^{‡}	11 February 2005 – 7 December 2017	12 years, 299 days	John Paul II	
	Michel Aupetit	7 December 2017 – 2 December 2021	3 years, 360 days	Francis	
	Laurent Ulrich	26 April 2022 – present	3 years, 69 days	Francis	

== Bibliography ==
- Acton, John Dalberg-Acton, 1st Baron Acton; Simpson, Richard (1975). Altholz, Josef L.; McElrath, Damian; Holland, James C. (eds.). The Correspondence of Lord Acton and Richard Simpson. Vol. 3. Cambridge University Press. ISBN 9780521205528.
- Albanès, Joseph Hyacinthe (1895). Gallia Christiana novissima (in French).
- Bergin, Joseph (1996). The Making of the French Episcopate, 1589–1661. Yale University Press. ISBN 9780300067514.
- Bergin, Joseph (2004). Crown, Church, and Episcopate Under Louis XIV. Yale University Press. ISBN 9780300103564.
- Fisquet, Honoré (1864). La France pontificale (in French).
- Fornier, Marcellin; Juvénis, Raymond; Albert, Antoine; Guillaume, Paul (1892). Histoire générales des Alpes Maritimes ov Cottiènes (in French). Vol. 3. H. Champion. p. 53.
- de Gaulle, Joséphine (1839). Nouvelle Histoire de Paris (in French). Vol. 1. Pourrat Frères.
- Hebblethwaite, Peter; Hebblethwaite, Margaret (2000). John XXIII: Pope of the Century. Bloomsbury Academic. ISBN 9780826449955.
- Hsia, R. Po-chia (1998). The World of Catholic Renewal, 1540–1770. Cambridge University Press. ISBN 9780521445962.
- Jonas, Raymond (2000). France and the Cult of the Sacred Heart: An Epic Tale for Modern Times. University of California Press. ISBN 9780520221369.
- Kibler, William W. (1995). Medieval France: An Encyclopedia. Garland Publishing. ISBN 9780824044442.
- Lambert, Louis Amable Victor (1823). Vie de Messire Antoine-Éléonore-Léon Leclerc de Juigné (in French).
- Lentz, Harris M. III (2009). Popes and Cardinals of the 20th Century: A Biographical Dictionary. McFarland & Company. ISBN 9780786441013.
- Manceau, Jean (1987). Monseigneur Marie-Dominique-Auguste Sibour: Archevêque de Paris (1848–1857) (in French). Beauchesne. ISBN 9782701010687.
- Merriman, John (2018). History on the Margins: People and Places in the Emergence of Modern France. University of Nebraska Press. ISBN 9781496213082.
- Moisset, Jean-Pierre (2004). Les biens de ce monde: Les finances de l'Eglise catholique au XIXe siècle dans le diocèse de Paris (1802–1905) (in French). Presses Universitaires de Bordeaux. ISBN 9782867813252.
- O'Brien, Laura (3 January 2025). "Religion, Politics and Reconciliation in France: The Death of Archbishop Denis-Auguste Affre and the Revolution of 1848". The English Historical Review. 139 (601): 1468–1505.
- Regnault, Emile (1882). Christophe de Beaumont: Archevêque de Paris (1703–1781) (in French). Vol. 1.
- Du Saussois, Auguste (1887). Le Cardinal Guibert (Joseph-Hippolyte): Archevêque de Paris (in French).
- Smith, Jean Edward (2019). The Liberation of Paris: How Eisenhower, de Gaulle, and Von Choltitz Saved the City of Light. Simon & Schuster. ISBN 9781501164927.
- Walton, William (1899). Paris from the Earliest Period to the Present Day. Vol. 3. George Barrie & Son.
- Weigel, George (2009). Witness to Hope: The Biography of Pope John Paul II. HarperCollins. ISBN 9780061758645.
