= Chapels of Versailles =

Chapels in the palace of Versailles, France

Coordinates: 48°48′18″N 2°7′20″E

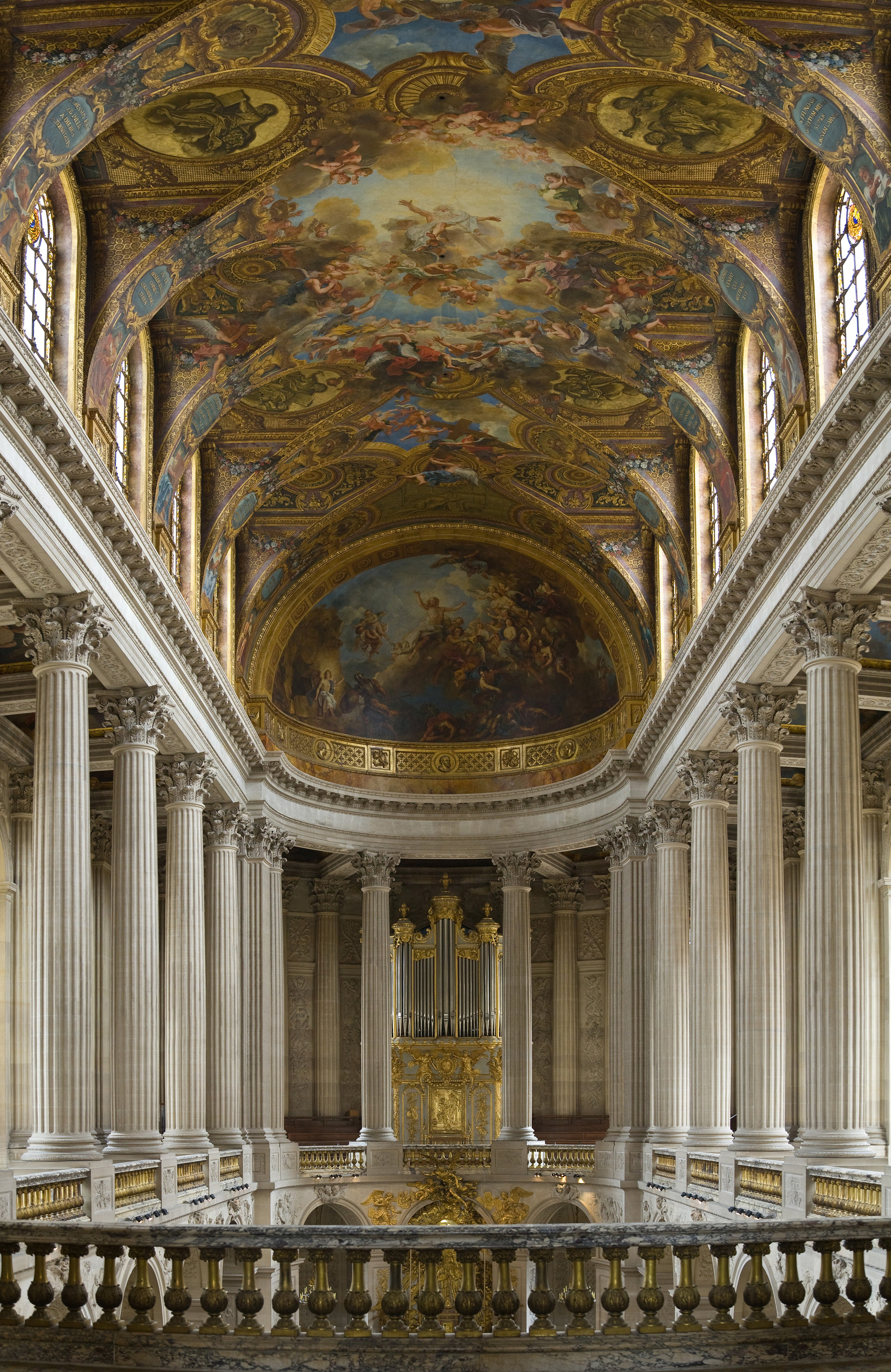
Versailles' chapel is one of the palace's grandest interiors. This is the view as seen from the tribune royale, where the king and members of the royal family heard daily Mass.

The present chapel of the Palace of Versailles is the fifth in the history of the palace. These chapels evolved with the expansion of the château and formed the focal point of the daily life of the court during the Ancien Régime (Bluche, 1986, 1991; Petitfils, 1995; Solnon, 1987).

== History of the chapels ==
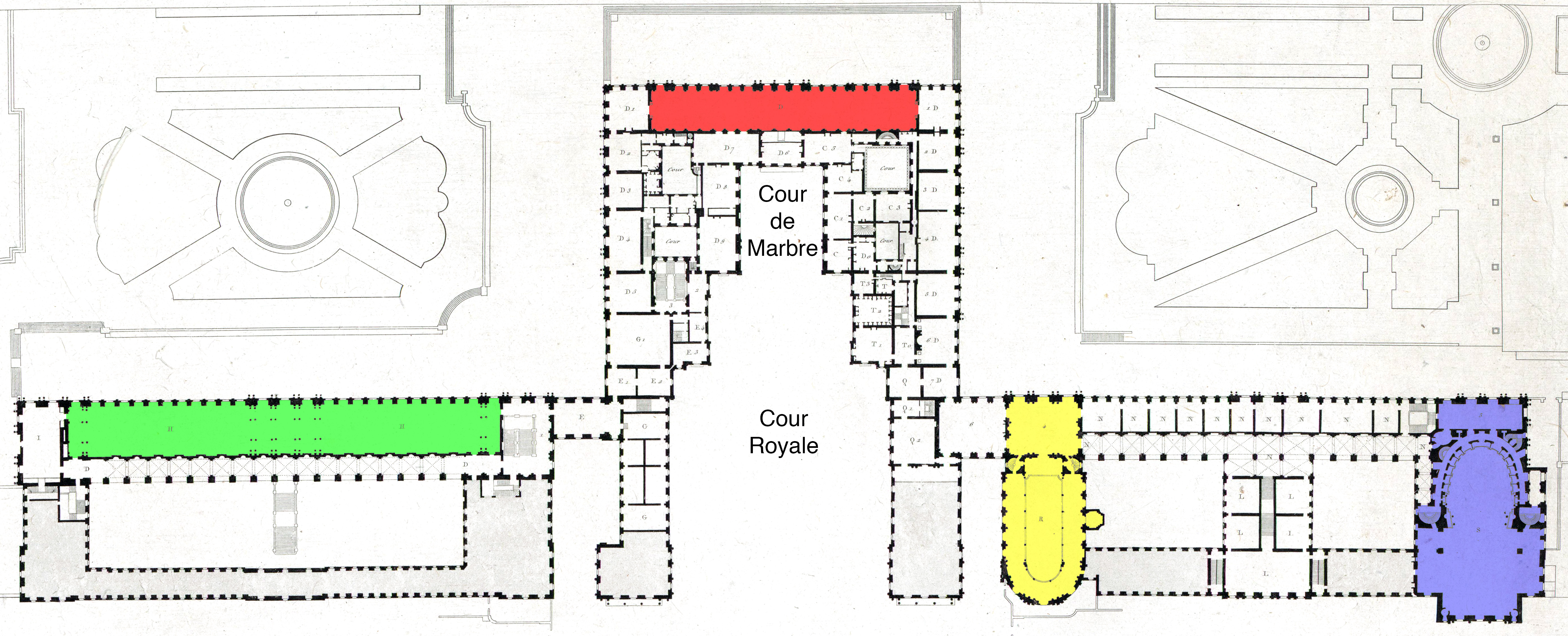
Plan of the main floor (c. 1837, with north to the right), showing the Royal Chapel in yellow, the Hall of Mirrors in red, the Hall of Battles in green, and the Royal Opera in blue.

=== First chapel ===
The château's first chapel dated from the time of Louis XIII, and was located in a detached pavilion at the northeast of the château. Today, the pièce de la vaisselle d'or in the Petit appartement du roi occupies the approximate site of this first chapel.

It followed the two-story palatine model, which was traditional in France; successive chapels at Versailles also followed this model. This chapel was demolished in 1665 during construction of the Grotte de Thétys (Batifol, 1909, 1913; Kimball, 1944; Le Guillou, 1983, 1989; Marie, 1968; Verlet, 1985).

=== Second chapel ===
The second chapel was constructed as part of Louis XIV's second building campaign (1669–1672), when Louis Le Vau constructed the Château Neuf. When the new part of the château was completed, the chapel was situated in the Grand appartement de la reine and formed the symmetrical pendant with the Salon de Diane in the Grand appartement du roi. This chapel was used by the royal family and court until 1678, when time a new chapel was built, and the structure converted into the Salle des Gardes de la Reine (Félibien, 1674; Kimball, 1944; Le Guillou, 1983, 1989; Marie, 1972, 1976; Scudéry, 1669; Verlet, 1985).

=== Third chapel ===
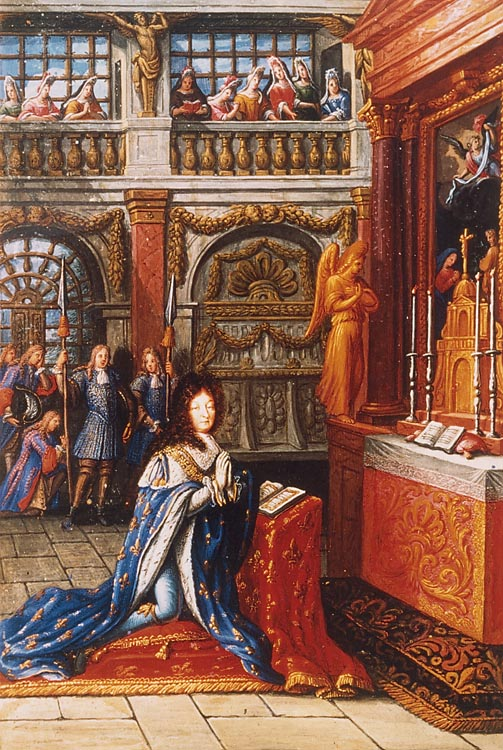
Louis XIV in prayer in the chapel of 1682 (miniature in the Heures de Louis le Grand, 1693, Bibliothèque nationale de France, ms. 9477, folio a verso)

Located next to the new Salle des Gardes de la Reine, this chapel served Versailles for a short period. Soon after its construction, Louis XIV found it inconvenient and impractical for his needs as well as those of his court, which he had officially installed at Versailles in 1682. That same year, this room was converted into the Grande Salles des Gardes de la Reine (and now exists as la Salle du Sacre) and a new chapel was built (Combes, 1681; Kimball, 1944; Le Guillou, 1983, 1989; Marie, 1972, 1976; Verlet, 1985).

=== Fourth chapel ===
With the construction of the Aile du Nord, the north wing of the château, a new chapel was built. This project necessitated the destruction of the Grotte de Thétys; it was on this site that the new chapel was built in 1682. When the fourth chapel was constructed, the Salon de l'Abondance, which had served as the entry to the Cabinet des Médailles in the Petit appartement du roi, was transformed into the Vestibule de la Chapelle — so named as it was from this upper level of the chapel that the king and select members of the royal family heard daily Mass. This chapel remained in use until 1710, and was witness to many of the important events of the court and royal family during the reign of Louis XIV. Today, the Salon d'Hercule and the lower vestibule occupy the space of this site (Félibien, 1703; Kimball, 1944; Le Guillou, 1983, 1989; Marie, 1972, 1976; Piganiole de la Force, 1701; Verlet, 1985).

=== Fifth chapel ===
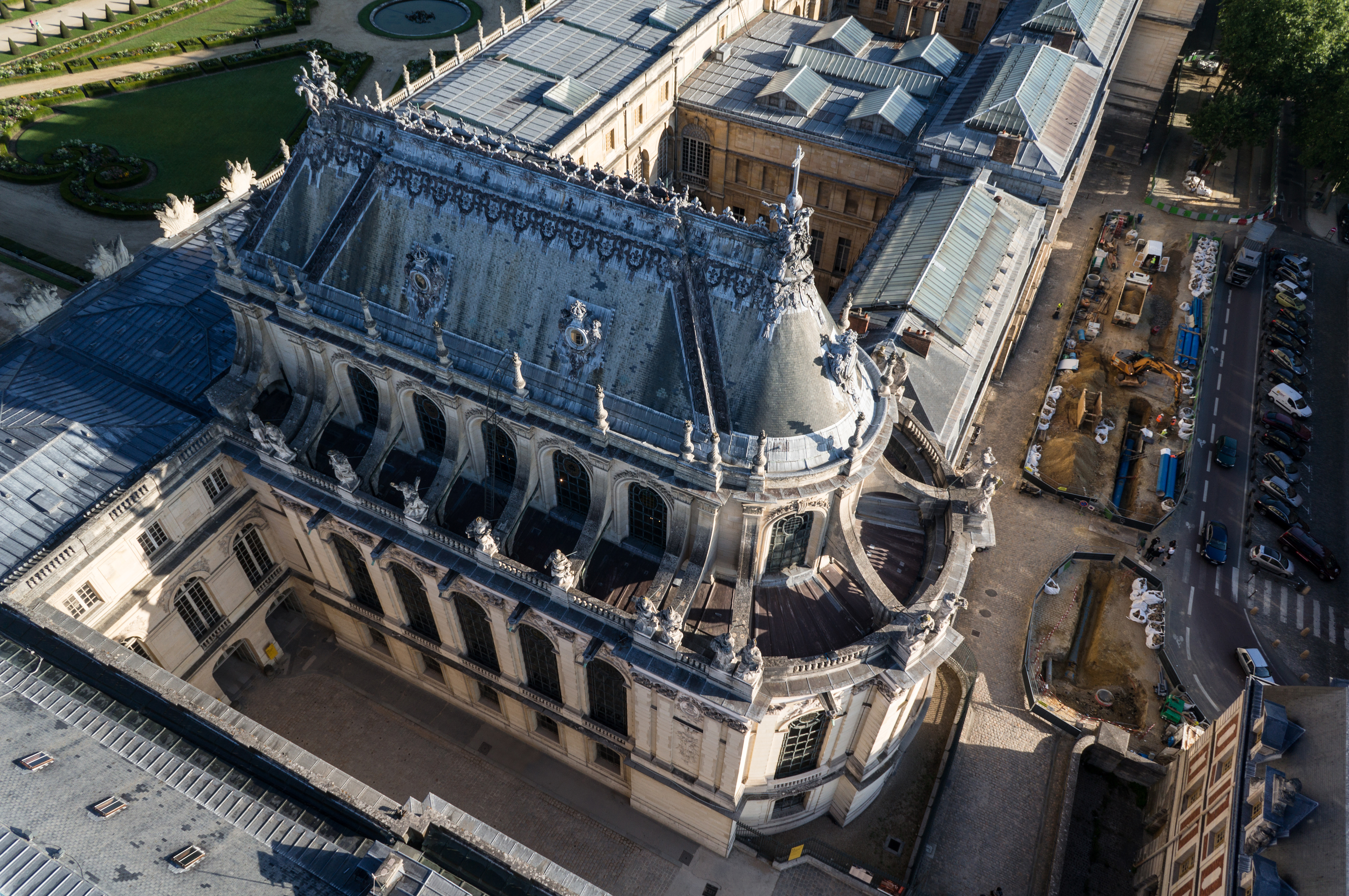
Aerial view of Louis XIV's Baroque chapel at Versailles

As the focal point of Louis XIV's fourth (and last) building campaign (1699–1710), the fifth and final chapel of the château of Versailles is an unreserved masterpiece. Begun in 1689, construction was halted due to the War of the League of Augsburg; Jules Hardouin-Mansart resumed construction in 1699. Hardouin-Mansart continued working on the project until his death in 1708, at which time his brother-in-law, Robert de Cotte, finished the project (Blondel, 1752–1756; Marie, 1972, 1976; Nolhac, 1912–1913; Verlet, 1985; Walton, 1993). It was to become the largest of the royal chapels at Versailles, and the height of its vaulting alone was allowed to disturb the rather severe horizontality everywhere else apparent in the palace's roofline, leading to the design being disparaged by some contemporaries; the duc de Saint-Simon characterized it as an "enormous catafalque". Nevertheless, the magnificent interior has been widely admired to the present day and served as inspiration for Luigi Vanvitelli when he designed the chapel for the Palace of Caserta (Defilippis, 1968).

Dedicated to Saint Louis, patron saint of the Bourbons, the chapel was consecrated in 1710. The palatine model is of course traditional; however, the Corinthian colonnade of the tribune level is of a classic style that anticipates the neo-classicism that evolved during the 18th century, although its use here bespeaks a remarkable virtuosity. The tribune level is accessed by a vestibule, known as the Salon de la Chapelle, that was built at the same time as the chapel. The Salon de la Chapelle is decorated with white stone and the bas-relief sculpture, Louis XIV Crossing the Rhine by Nicolas and Guillaume Coustou forms the focal point of the rooms décor (Nolhac, 1912–1913; Verlet, 1985; Walton, 1993).

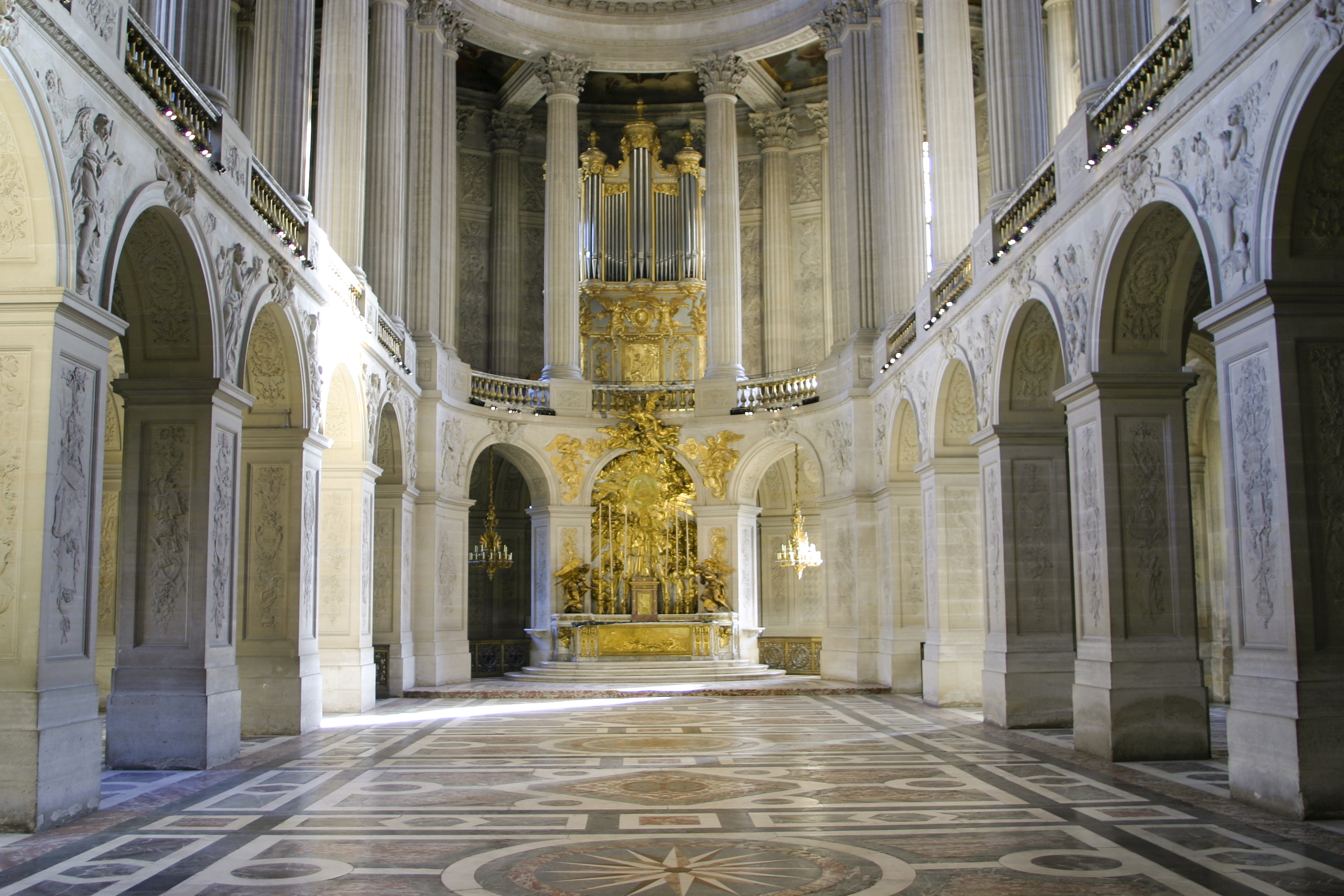
Altar of the chapel of Versailles

The floor of the chapel itself is inlaid with polychromatic marble, and at the steps at the foot of the altar is the crowned monogram of an interlaced double "L", alluding to Saint Louis and Louis XIV (Nolhac, 1912–1913; Verlet, 1985; Walton, 1993). The sculptural and painted decoration shows both Old Testament and New Testament themes (Lighthart, 1997; Nolhac, 1912–1913; Sabatier, 1999; Verlet, 1985; Walton, 1993). The ceiling of the nave represents God the Father in His Glory Bringing to the World the Promise of Redemption and was painted by Antoine Coypel; the exedra of the apse is decorated with Charles de la Fosse's The Resurrection of Christ; and, above the royal tribune is Jean Jouvenet's The Descent of the Holy Ghost upon the Virgin and the Apostles (Nolhac, 1912–1913; Walton, 1993).

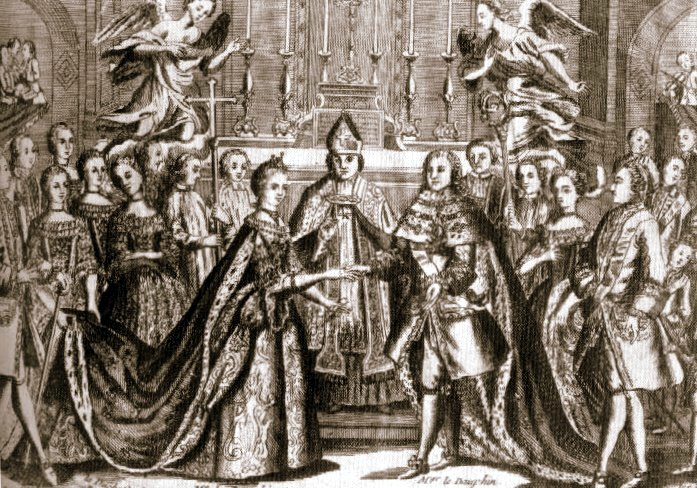
Engraving of the wedding ceremony of Marie Antoinette and the future Louis XVI, who were married in the chapel on May 16, 1770.

During the 18th century, the chapel witnessed many court events. Te Deums were sung to celebrate military victories and the births of children (Fils de France and fille de France) to the king and queen; marriages were also celebrated in this chapel, such as the wedding of Louis XV's son the dauphin Louis with the Infanta Marie-Thérèse d'Espagne of Spain on 23 February 1745 and the wedding on 16 May 1770 of the dauphin – later Louis XVI – with Marie Antoinette. However, of all the ceremonies held in the chapel, those associated the Order of the Holy Spirit were among the most elaborate. (Blondel, 1752–1756; Bluche, 2000; Boughton, 1986; Campan, 1823; Croÿ-Solre, 1906–1921; Hézuques, 1873; Luynes, 1860–1865; Nolhac, 1912–1913).

The chapel was de-consecrated in the 19th century and has since served as a venue for state and private events. Musical concerts are often held in this present chapel of Versailles.

==== Organ ====
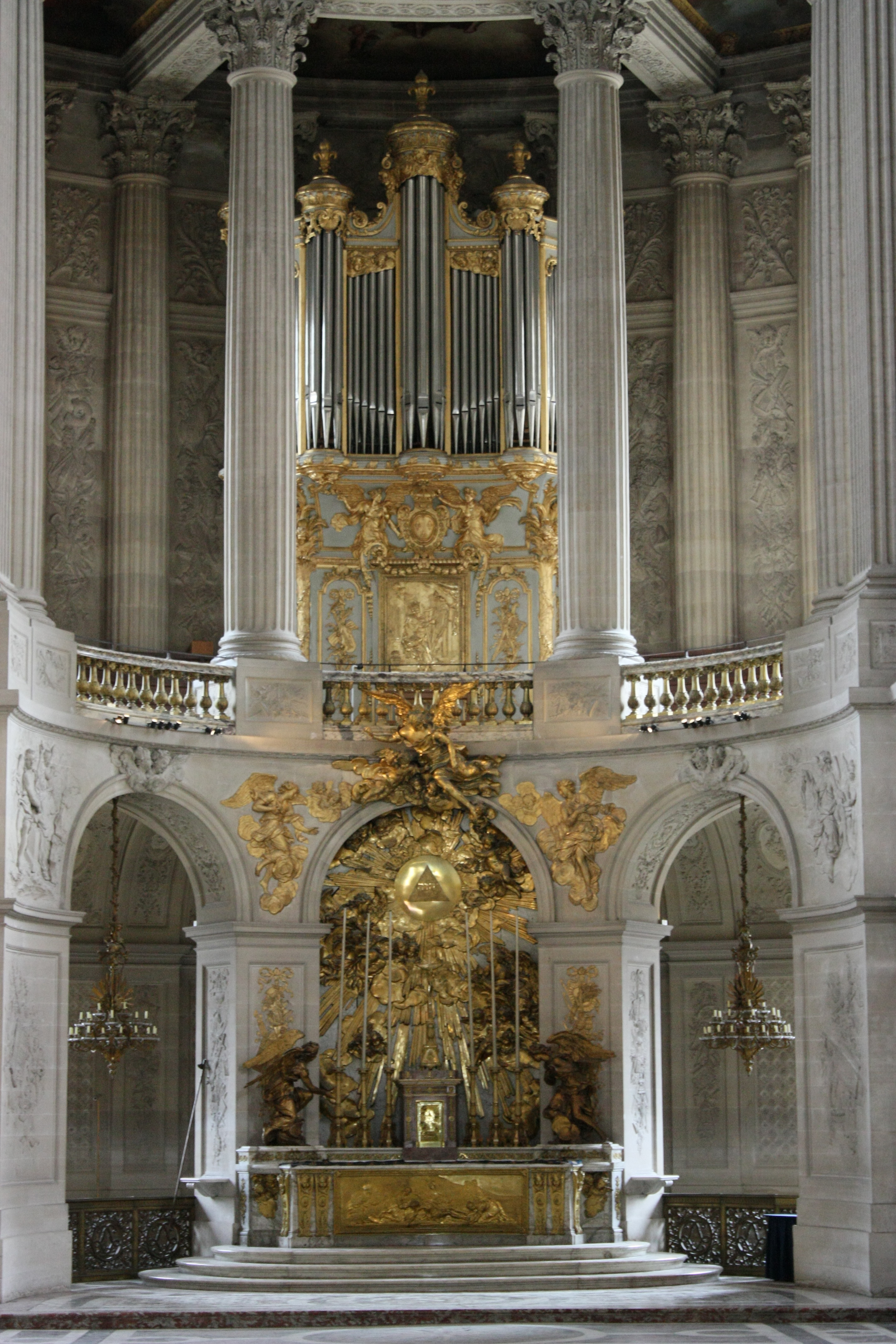
The organ of the royal chapel of Versailles

The organ of the fifth chapel of Versailles was built by Robert Clicquot and Julien Tribuot in 1709–1710. His first official presentation took place on Pentecost, Juin 8, 1710; the organist was Jean-Baptiste Buterne.

==== Marriages ====
- July 24, 1685: Louis, Duke of Bourbon and Louise Françoise de Bourbon
  Celebrated by the Bishop of Orléans
- February 18, 1692: Philippe, Duke of Chartres and Françoise Marie de Bourbon
  Celebrated by the Cardinal de Bouillon
- May 19, 1692: Louis Auguste, Duke of Maine and Louise Bénédicte de Bourbon
  Celebrated by the Cardinal de Bouillon
- January 19, 1732: Louis François, Prince of Conti and Louise Diane d'Orléans
  Celebrated by the Prince-Bishop of Strasbourg
- December 17, 1743: Louis Philippe, Duke of Chartres and Louise Henriette de Bourbon
  Celebrated by the Archbishop of Paris
- December 29, 1744: Louis Jean Marie, Duke of Penthièvre and Maria Teresa Felicitas d'Este
  Celebrated by the Archbishop of Paris
- February 23, 1745: Louis, Dauphin of France and Maria Teresa Rafaela of Spain
  Celebrated by the Prince-Bishop of Strasbourg
- May 3, 1753: Louis Joseph, Prince of Condé and Charlotte de Rohan
  Celebrated by the Archbishop of Paris
- April 5, 1769: Louis Philippe, Duke of Chartres and Louise Marie Adélaïde de Bourbon
  Celebrated by the Archbishop of Paris
- April 24, 1770: Louis Henri, Duke of Enghien and Bathilde d'Orléans
  Celebrated by the Archbishop of Paris
- May 16, 1770: Louis Auguste, Dauphin of France and Marie Antoinette of Austria
  Celebrated by the Archbishop of Reims
- May 14, 1771: Louis Stanislas Xavier de France and Marie Joséphine of Savoy
  Celebrated by the Archbishop of Paris
- November 16, 1773: Charles Philippe of France and Maria Theresa of Savoy
  Celebrated by the Archbishop of Paris

===== Discography =====
1. the Du Roy-Soleil à la Révolution, l'orgue de la Chapelle royale de Versailles / From the Sun King to the Revolution, the organ of the Royal Chapel of Versailles. Marina Tchebourkina at the Great Organ of the Royal Chapel of the Palace of Versailles. — 2004. (EAN 13 : 3760075340032)
2. Louis Claude Daquin, l'œuvre intégrale pour orgue / Louis Claude Daquin, Complete organ works. Marina Tchebourkina at the Great Organ of the Royal Chapel of the Palace of Versailles. — 2004. (EAN 13 : 3760075340049)
3. Louis Marchand, l'œuvre intégrale pour orgue / Louis Marchand, Complete organ works. Marina Tchebourkina at the Great Organ of the Royal Chapel of the Palace of Versailles. 2-CD set. — 2005. (EAN 13 : 3760075340056)
4. François Couperin, l'œuvre intégrale pour orgue / François Couperin, Complete organ works. Marina Tchebourkina at the Great Organ of the Royal Chapel at the Palace of Versailles. 2-CD set. — 2005. (EAN 13 : 3760075340063)

===== Bibliography =====
1. M. Tchebourkina. L'Orgue de la Chapelle royale de Versailles, Trois siècles d'histoire (The Organ of the Royal Chapel of Versailles, Three centuries of history). — Paris : Natives, 2010. — 256 p. (ISBN 978-2-911662-09-6).
2. Чебуркина М. Н. Французское органное искусство Барокко: Музыка, Органостроение, Исполнительство (French Baroque Organ Art: Musique, Organ building, Performance). — Paris : Natives, 2013. — 848 с. (ISBN 978-2-911662-10-2).
3. M. Tchebourkina. The Organ of the Royal Chapel: from the Sun King to… well after the Revolution // Livret CD – Du Roy-Soleil à la Révolution, l'orgue de la Chapelle royale de Versailles. — Paris : Natives / CDNAT03, 2004. — P. 39–48. (EAN 13 : 3760075340032).
4. M. Tchebourkina. Nouveaux regards sur Le Marché ancien : Ce qui fut fait, fut-il fourni ? (The new views on The Ancient Deal: What was done, was it provided?) // Livret CD – Du Roy-Soleil à la Révolution, l'orgue de la Chapelle royale de Versailles. — Paris : Natives / CDNAT03, 2004. — P. 51–54 (EAN 13 : 3760075340032).
5. M. Tchebourkina. Nouveaux regards sur Le Marché ancien : Le jeu des nouveaux jeux (The new views on The Ancient Deal: Play of new Stops) // Livret CD – Louis Claude Daquin, l'œuvre intégrale pour orgue. — Paris : Natives / CDNAT04, 2004. — P. 47–50 (EAN 13 : 3760075340049).
6. M. Tchebourkina. L'orgue de la Chapelle royale de Versailles : À la recherche d'une composition perdue (The Organ of the Royal Chapel of Versailles: In search of a lost Organ Disposition) // L'Orgue. — Lyon, 2007. 2007–IV No. 280. — P. 3–112 (ISSN 0030-5170).
7. M. Tchebourkina. Tricentenaire de l'orgue de la Chapelle royale de Versailles (1710–2010) : De la première mise en service de l'orgue (Tricentary of the Organ of the Royal Chapel of Versailles (1710–2010): About the first official putting into service of the organ ) // L'Orgue. — Lyon, 2009. 2009–III–IV No. 287–288. — P. 258–260 (ISSN 0030-5170).
8. M. Tchebourkina. L'orgue de la Chapelle royale de Versailles (1710–2010) : Les progrès de la connaissance ou l'art difficile de l'humilité (The Organ of the Royal Chapel of Versailles (1710–2010): Advances in knowledges, or Difficult art of humility) // L'Orgue. — Lyon, 2010. 2010–III No. 291. — P. 35–69 (ISSN 0030-5170).
9. M. Tchebourkina. Tricentenaire de l'orgue de la Chapelle royale de Versailles (1710–2010) (Tricentary of the Organ of the Royal Chapel of Versailles (1710–2010)) // Versalia. — Versailles, 2011. No. 14. — P. 143–175 (ISSN 1285-8412).

== Sources ==
Books

- Amiel, Olivier (1985). Lettres de Madame duchesse d'Orléans née Princesse Palatine. Paris: Mercure de France.
- Archives nationales (1983). Versailles: dessins d'architecture de la Direction général des bâtiments du roi. Vol. Danielle Gallet-Guerne, ed. Paris: Archives nationales.
- Berger, Robert W (1986). Versailles: The Chateau of Louis XIV. University Park: The College Arts Association.
- Blondel, Jacques-François (1752–1756). Architecture françoise, ou Recueil des plans, élévations, coupes et profils des églises, maisons royales, palais, hôtels & édifices les plus considérables de Paris. Vol. 4. Paris: Charles-Antoine Jombert.
- Bluche, François (1986). Louis XIV. Paris: Arthème Fayard.
- Bluche, François (1991). Dictionnaire du Grand Siècle. Paris: Arthème Fayard.
- Bluche, François (2000). Louis XV. Paris: Perrin.
- Boughton, Bradford B (1986). Dictionary of Medieval Knighthood and Chivalry: Concepts and Terms. New York: Greenwood Press.
- Campan, Madame (1823). Mémoires sur la vie privée de Marie-Antoinette. Vol. 3 vol. Paris: Baudouin frères.
- Combes, sieur de (1681). Explication historique de ce qu'il y a de plus remarquable dans la maison royale de Versailles. Paris: C. Nego.
- Cosnac, Gabriel-Jules, comte de (1882). Mémoires du marquis de Sourches sur le règne de Louis XIV. Vol. 3. Paris: Librairie Hachette et Cie.
- Croÿ-Solre, Emmanuel de (1906–1921). Journal inédit du duc de Croÿ. Vol. eds. Emmanuel-Henri de Grouchy and Paul Cottin. 4 volumes. Paris: E. Flammarion.
- Dangeau, marquis de (1854). Journal avec les additions inedites du duc de Saint-Simon. Vol. 3. (1689-1692). Paris: Firmin Didot Freres.
- Decaux, Alain (1970). Les grands heures de Versailles. Paris: Librairie Académique Perrin.
- Defilippis, Felice (1968). Il palazzo reale di Caserta e i Borboni di Napoli. Cava dei Tirreni-Napoli: Di Mauro.
- Amiel, Olivier (1985). Lettres de Madame duchesse d'Orléans née Princesse Palatine. Paris: Mercure de France.
- Edmunds, Martha Mel Stumberg (2002). Piety and Politics: Imagining Divine Kingship in Louis XIV's Chapel at Versailles. Newark: University of Delaware Press. ISBN 9780874136937.
- Félibien, Jean-François (1703). Description sommaire de Versailles ancienne et nouvelle. Paris: A. Chrétien.
- Guiffery, Jules and P. Marce (1927). Inventaire général des dessins du musée du Louvre et du musée de Versailles. Paris.
- Guiffrey, Jules (1880–1890). Comptes des bâtiments du roi sous le règne de Louis XIV. Vol. 5 volumes. Paris: Imprimerie Nationale.
- Hézecques, Félix, comte de France d' (1873). Souveniers d'un page à la cour de Louis XVI. Paris: Didier et Cie.
- Lighthart, Edward (1987). Archétype et symbole dans le style Louis XIV versaillais: réflexions sur l'imago rex et l'imago patriae au début de l'époque moderne. Doctoral thesis.
- Luynes, Charles-Philippe d'Albert, duc de (1860–1865). Mémoires sur la cour de Louis XV (1735-1758). Vol. 17 volumes. Paris : Firmin-Didot frères.
- Marie, Alfred (1968). Naissance de Versailles. Paris: Edition Vincent, Freal & Cie.
- Marie, Alfred and Jeanne (1972). Mansart à Versailles. Paris: Editions Jacques Freal.
- Marie, Alfred and Jeanne (1976). Versailles au temps de Louis XIV. Paris: Imprimerie Nationale.
- Marie, Alfred and Jeanne (1984). Versailles au temps de Louis XV. Paris: Imprimerie Nationale.
- Mauricheau-Beaupré, Charles (1949). Versailles. Paris: Draeger et Veive.
- Monicart, Jean-Baptiste de (1720). Versailles immortalisé. Paris: E. Ganeau.
- Nolhac, Pierre de (1912). La Chapelle royale de Versailles. Versailles et Paris: Éditions artistiques et scientifiques.
- Nolhac, Pierre de (1901). La création de Versailles. Versailles: L. Bernard.
- Nolhac, Pierre de (1911). Histoire de Versailles. Vol. 3 volumes. Paris: André Marty.
- Nolhac, Pierre de (1925). Versailles, résidence de Louis XIV. Paris: Louis Conard.
- Nolhac, Pierre de (1926). Versailles au XVIIIe siècle. Paris: Louis Conard.
- Nolhac, Pierre de (1929). Versailles. Paris: A. Morancé.
- Petitfils, Jean-Christian (1995). Louis XIV. Paris: Perrin.
- Petitfils, Jean-Christian (2005). Louis XVI. Paris: Perrin.
- Piganiol de la Force, Jean-Aymar (1701). Nouvelle description des châteaux et parcs de Versailles et Marly. Paris: Chez Florentin de la lune.
- Sabatier, Gérard (1999). Versailles, ou la figure du roi. Paris: Albin Michel.
- Saint-Simon, Louis de Rouvroy, duc de (1856–1858). Mémoires complets et authentiques du duc de Saint-Simon sur le siècle de Louis XIV et la Régence. Vol. Eds. Adolphe Chéruel and Charles-Augustin Sainte-Beuve. Volume 6. Paris: Hachette.
- Scudérey, Madeleine de (1669). La Promenade de Versailles. Paris: Chez Claude Barbin.
- Sevigné, Marie de Rabutin Chantal, Madame de (1976). Letters de Madame de Sevigné. Paris: Flammarion.
- Solnon, Jean-François (1987). La cour de France. Paris: Fayard.
- Verlet, Pierre (1985). Le château de Versailles. Paris: Librairie Arthème Fayard.

Journals

- Batiffol, Louis (April 1909). "Origine du château de Versailles". La Revue de Paris: 841–869.
- Batiffol, Louis (November 1913). "Le château de Versailles de Louis XIII et son architecte Philbert le Roy". Gazette des Beaux-Arts. 4. pér., vol. 10: 341–371.
- Berger, Robert W (1985). "Les guides imprimés de Versailles sous Louis XIV et le oeuvres d'art allégoriques". Colloque de Versailles.
- Berger, Robert W (1980). "The chronology of the Enveloppe of Versailles". Architectura. 10: 105–133.
- Bottineau, Yves (October 1988). "Essais sur le Versailles de Louis XIV II: le style et l'iconographie". Gazette des Beaux-Arts. 6. per., vol. 112: 119–132.
- Bottineau, Yves (September 1988). "Essais sur le Versailles de Louis XIV I: La distribution du château Versailles, le plan du domaine et de la ville". Gazette des Beaux-Arts. 6. per., vol. 112: 77–89.
- Deshairs. L (June 1905). "Documents inedits sur la chapelle du château de Versailles". Revue de l'Histoire de Versailles: 241–262, 61–85.
- Dubu, Jean (April–June 1989). "Racine et l'iconographie de Versailles". Dix-septième Siècle. 163 (2): 195–204.
- Dufourcq, Norbert (April 1934). "L'orgue de la chapelle de Versailles". La Revue musicale (145): 283–297.
- Fromageot, P (1903). "Le château de Versailles en 1795 d'après le journal de Huges Lagarde". Revue de l'Histoire de Versailles: 224–240.
- Himelfarb, Hélène. "Versailles, fonctions et legendes". Les Lieux de Mémoire: La Nation II: 235–292.
- Johnson, Kevin Orlin (January 1981). "Il n'y a plus de Pyrenées: the Iconography of the first Versailles of Louis XIV". Gazette des Beaux-Arts. 6. pér., vol. 97: 29–40.
- Josephson, Ragnar (1926). "Relation de la visite de Nicodème Tessin à Marly, Versailles, Rueil, et St-Cloud en 1687". Revue de l'Histoire de Versailles: 150–67, 274–300.
- Kimball, Fiske (1944). "The chapels of the Château de Versailles". Gazette des Beaux-Arts. 6. pér., vol. 26: 315–332.
- Kimball, Fiske (1949). "Genesis of the Château Neuf at Versailles, 1668-1671". Gazette des Beaux-Arts. 6. pér., vol. 35: 353–372.
- Le Guillou, Jean-Claude (December 1983). "Le château-neuf ou enveloppe de Versailles: concept et evolution du premier projet". Gazette des Beaux-Arts. 6. pér., vol. 102: 193–207.
- Le Guillou, Jean-Claude (February 1989). "Aperçu sur un projet insolit (1668) pour le château de Versailles". Gazette des Beaux-Arts. 6. pér., vol. 113: 79–104.
- Le Guillou, Jean-Claude (February 1976). "Remarques sur le corps central du château de Versailles à partir du château de Louis XIII". Gazette des Beaux-Arts. 6. pér., vol. 87: 49–60.
- Mâle, Émile (1927). "Le clef des allegories peintes et sculptées de Versailles". Revue de l'Histoire de Versailles: 73–82.
- Nolhac, Pierre de (1899). "La construction de Versailles de Le Vau". Revue de l'Histoire de Versailles: 161–171.
- Pommier, Edouard. "Versailles, l'image du souverain". Les Lieux de Mémoire: La Nation II: 193–234.
- Pradel, Paul (1937). "Le symbolisme de la chapelle de Versailles". Bulletin Monumental. 96 (3): 335–355. doi:10.3406/bulmo.1937.8543.
- Stevlingson, Norma (1985). "Les organistes, leur musique, et les orgues de la chapelle royal de Versailles sous le règne de Louis XIV". Colloque de Versailles.
- Verlet, Pierre (1968). "Les tapis de la chapelle de Versailles au XVIIIe siècle". Revue de l'Art. 1–2: 65–71. doi:10.3917/rda.001.0065.
- Walton, Guy (May 1993). "The Chapelle Royale". Eighteenth Century Life. 17, n.s., 2: 86–94.
