= François de Crussol d'Uzès =

French Catholic Bishop of Blois

His Grace François de Crussol d'Uzès
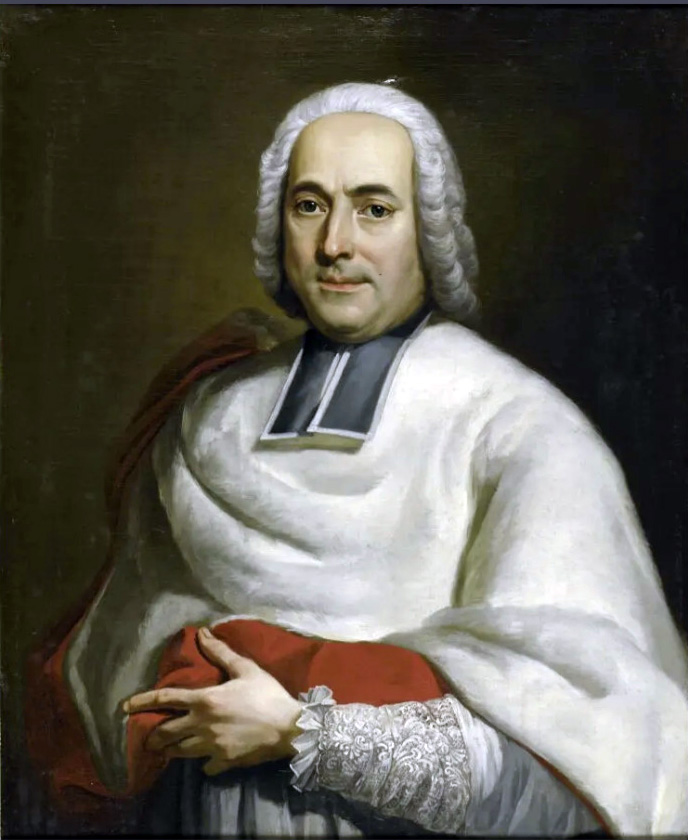
- Church: Catholic Church
- Archdiocese: Toulouse
- See: Toulouse Cathedral
- Installed: 1753
- Term ended: 1758
- Predecessor: Charles Antoine de La Roche-Aymon
- Successor: Arthur Richard Dillon
- Other post: Bishop of Blois

Orders
- Consecration: January 1735 by Charles-Gaspard-Guillaume de Vintimille du Luc

Personal details
- Born: 24 January 1702 Château de Montmaur, Lauragais, France
- Died: 30 April 1758 (aged 56) Paris, France
- Coat of arms

François de Crussol d'Uzès, sometimes referred to as Crussol d'Uzès d'Amboise (24 January 1702 – 30 April 1758) was a French cleric who belonged to a cadet branch of the illustrious House of Crussol. He served, successively, as the Bishop of Blois, then Archbishop of Toulouse.

== Early life ==
Crussol was born at the Château de Montmaur in Lauragais on 24 January 1702. He was the youngest son of Alexandre Galliot de Crussol d'Uzès, known as Count of Amboise (by right of his mother), and Charlotte Gabrielle de Timbrune de Valence. Another member of his extended family, François-Emmanuel de Crussol d'Uzès, served as Bishop of La Rochelle from 1768 to 1789.

== Career ==
He was ordained a priest at the age of 22 and had to plead against the Duke of Uzès in order to obtain an ecclesiastical benefice for his family. He was dismissed but obtained compensation in August 1727 with the command of the Charroux Abbey in the Diocese of Poitiers. He was designated as Bishop of Blois in 1724, confirmed on 17 November 1724, and consecrated in January 1735 by Charles-Gaspard-Guillaume de Vintimille du Luc, the Archbishop of Paris. In his diocese of Blois, he appointed as vicar general his friend, Christophe de Beaumont, who would be named Bishop of Bayonne in 1741 before himself acceding to the Archbishopric of Paris in 1746.

In 1740, François de Crussol received the command of the Abbey of Saint-Germain d'Auxerre and was transferred and promoted to the Archbishopric of Toulouse in 1753, confirmed in September; taking possession of the Archdiocese on 12 January 1755. He was received into the Parlement of Toulouse as a "councillor" and participated in the same year in the General Assembly of the Clergy.

== Personal life ==
Crussol died in Paris on 30 April 1758 at the home of his friend, Christophe de Beaumont, then the Archbishop of Paris. He was buried in the Church of the Barnabites.

Catholic Church titles
Preceded by Jean Paul François Le Févre de Caumartin	Bishop of Blois; 1734–1753	Succeeded by Charles-Gilbert de May de Termont
Preceded by Charles Antoine de La Roche-Aymon	Archbishop of Toulouse; 1753–1758	Succeeded by Arthur Richard Dillon
