= Marina Tchebourkina =

Marina Tchebourkina Марина Чебуркина
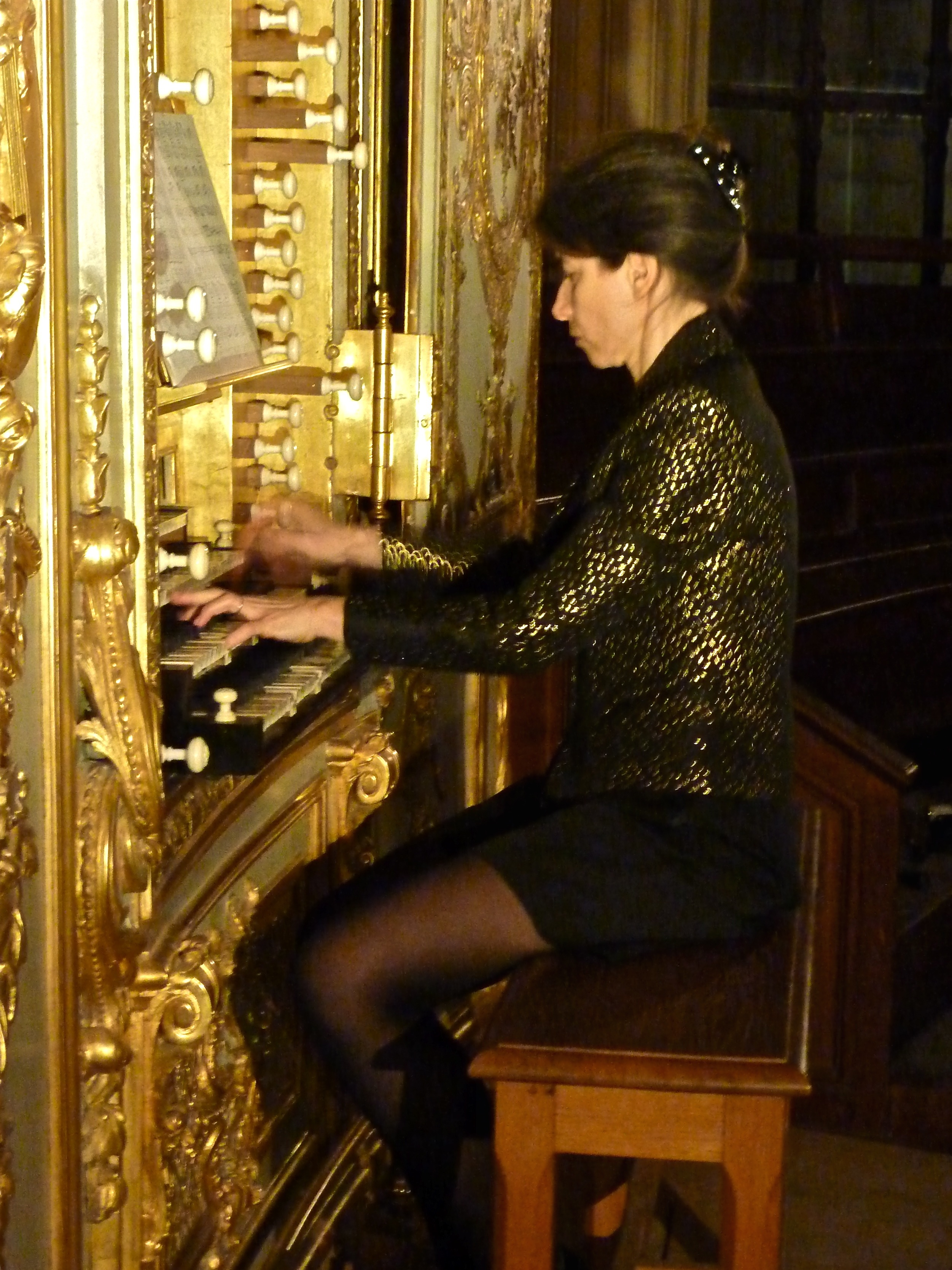
- Marina Tchebourkina at the organ of the Royal Chapel, Versailles

Background information
- Born: 6 March 1965 (age 61); Moscow, Russia
- Genres: Classical
- Occupations: Organist, musicologist
- Instrument: Organ
- Years active: since 1989
- Label: Natives Éditions
- Website: www.marina-tchebourkina.com

Marina Nikolayevna Tchebourkina (Russian: Марина Николаевна Чебуркина) is a French and Russian organist and musicologist. She has a Doctor of Sciences (the highest post-doctoral) degree in the Arts. Marina Tchebourkina is known as an expert in French Baroque organ art and an ambassador of Russian organ music.

== Biography ==
Marina Tchebourkina studied music at the Moscow State Tchaikovsky Conservatory and graduated summa cum laude in organ and in musicology in 1989. She completed post-graduate degrees in organ (Doctor of Musical Arts) and in musicology (PhD) at the Moscow Tchaikovsky conservatory in 1992. From 1992 to 1994, on a grant from the French government, she studied in France with Marie-Claire Alain, Michel Chapuis (at The Conservatoire National Supérieur de Musique et de Danse de Paris) and Louis Robilliard, and in Germany with Harald Vogel.

From 1996 to 2010, Marina Tchebourkina was the organist at the Royal Chapel of Versailles. Since 2006, she has been a member of the French National Commission for Historic Monuments (Organ section). In 2010, she became a regular collaborator at the Moscow Tchaikovsky Conservatory, offering recitals, Master classes, International Scientific Conferences, consulting for organ building projects and serving as a member of the jury at International Organ competitions. In 2013, Marina Tchebourkina was nominated as an Associate Researcher at Pantheon-Sorbonne University (Paris–I), head of the program "Organ, Arts and Sciences".

== Scientific degrees ==
1994: Candidate of Sciences in the Arts ("Kandidat iskusstvovedenia"); theme of doctoral thesis: "The Organ music of Olivier Messiaen"; defended before the Scientific Council of Moscow State Tchaikovsky Conservatory.

2013: Doctor of Sciences in the Arts ("Doktor iskusstvovedenia"); theme of higher post-doctoral thesis: "The French Baroque Organ Art: Music, Organ building, Performance"; defended before the Scientific Council of Moscow State Tchaikovsky Conservatory.

== Distinctions ==
2005: Knight of the Order of Arts and Letters (France).

== Discography ==
By Natives Éditions

=== French organ music: The King’s Organists and their contemporaries ===
- Claude Balbastre à Saint-Roch / Claude Balbastre at Saint-Roch. Marina Tchebourkina and Michel Chapuis at the Historical Great Organ of the Church of St Roch, Paris. 2-CD set. — 2002. (EAN 13 : 3760075340018)
- Du Roy-Soleil à la Révolution, l’orgue de la Chapelle royale de Versailles / From the Sun King to the Revolution, the organ of the Royal Chapel of Versailles. Marina Tchebourkina at the Great Organ of the Royal Chapel of the Palace of Versailles. — 2004. (EAN 13 : 3760075340032)
- Louis Claude Daquin, l’œuvre intégrale pour orgue / Louis Claude Daquin, Complete organ works. Marina Tchebourkina at the Great Organ of the Royal Chapel of the Palace of Versailles. — 2004. (EAN 13 : 3760075340049)
- Louis Marchand, l’œuvre intégrale pour orgue / Louis Marchand, Complete organ works. Marina Tchebourkina at the Great Organ of the Royal Chapel of the Palace of Versailles. 2-CD set. — 2005. (EAN 13 : 3760075340056)
- François Couperin, l’œuvre intégrale pour orgue / François Couperin, Complete organ works. Marina Tchebourkina at the Great Organ of the Royal Chapel of the Palace of Versailles. 2-CD set. — 2005. (EAN 13 : 3760075340063)
- Jean-Jacques Beauvarlet-Charpentier, œuvres pour orgue / Jean-Jacques Beauvarlet-Charpentier, Organ works. Marina Tchebourkina at the Historical Great Organ of the Abbey-church of Sainte-Croix, Bordeaux. 2-CD set. — 2007. (EAN 13 : 3760075340087)
- Gaspard Corrette, l’œuvre intégrale pour orgue / Gaspard Corrette, Complete organ works. Marina Tchebourkina at the Historical Great Organ of the Abbey-church of Saint-Michel-en-Thiérache. — 2009. (EAN 13 : 3760075340100)
- Nicolas de Grigny, l’œuvre intégrale pour orgue / Nicolas de Grigny, Complete organ works. Marina Tchebourkina at the Historical Great Organs of the Abbey-churches of Saint-Michel-en-Thiérache and Sainte-Croix of Bordeaux. 2-CD set. — 2015. (EAN 13 : 3760075340148)
- Jean Adam Guilain, l’œuvre intégrale pour orgue / Jean Adam Guilain, Complete organ works. Marina Tchebourkina at the Historical Great Organ of the Abbey-church of Saint-Michel-en-Thiérache. – 2016. (EAN 13 : 3760075340155)
- Pierre Du Mage, Louis Nicolas Clérambault, l’œuvre intégrale pour orgue / Pierre Du Mage, Louis Nicolas Clérambault, Complete organ works. Marina Tchebourkina at the Historical Great Organ of the Abbey-church of Saint-Michel-en-Thiérache. – 2019. (EAN 13 : 3760075340179)

=== Russian organ music ===
- Deux siècles de musique russe pour orgue / Two centuries of Russian organ music. Marina Tchebourkina at the Historical Great Organ of the Church of St Sulpice, Paris. 2-CD set. — 2003. (EAN 13 : 3760075340025)
- Youri Boutsko, Grand cahier d’Orgue / Youri Boutsko, Great Organ notebook. Marina Tchebourkina at the Historical Great Organ of the Abbey-church of St Etienne, Caen. — 2010. (EAN 13 : 3760075340117)
- Dmitri Dianov, l’Îlot, œuvres pour orgue / Dmitri Dianov, The Isle, organ works. Marina Tchebourkina at the Historical Great Organ of the Abbey-church of St Etienne, Caen. — 2010. (EAN 13 : 3760075340124)
- Youri Boutsko, Deuxième Grand cahier d’Orgue : Images russes, Tableaux, Légendes, Histoires véridiques et invraisemblables / Youri Boutsko, Second Great Organ Notebook: Russian Images, Pictures, Legends, True and Unbelievable Stories (dedicated to Marina Tchebourkina). Marina Tchebourkina at the Great Organ of the Church of St Martin, Dudelange, Luxembourg. — 2016. (EAN 13 : 3760075340162)

== Selected books ==
- Tchebourkina M. N. The French Baroque Organ Art: Musique, Organ building, Performance. — Paris : Natives, 2013. — 848 p. (ISBN 978-2-911662-10-2). Orig. title: Французское органное искусство Барокко: Музыка, Органостроение, Исполнительство.
- Tchebourkina M. The Organ of the Royal Chapel of Versailles, Three centuries of history. — Paris : Natives, 2010. — 256 p. (ISBN 978-2-911662-09-6) Orig. title: L’Orgue de la Chapelle royale de Versailles, Trois siècles d’histoire.
- Tchebourkina M. N. (annotated translation in Russian). Olivier Messiaen. The Technique of my Musical Language. — Moscou: Greko-latinski kabinet Yu. A. Shichalina, 1995. — 128 p. (ISBN 5-87245-0109). Orig. title: Оливье Мессиан. Техника моего музыкального языка (комментированный перевод).
