= Jean-Baptiste-Joseph Gobel =

French Catholic cleric and politician (1727–1794)

- Constitutional Archbishop of Paris
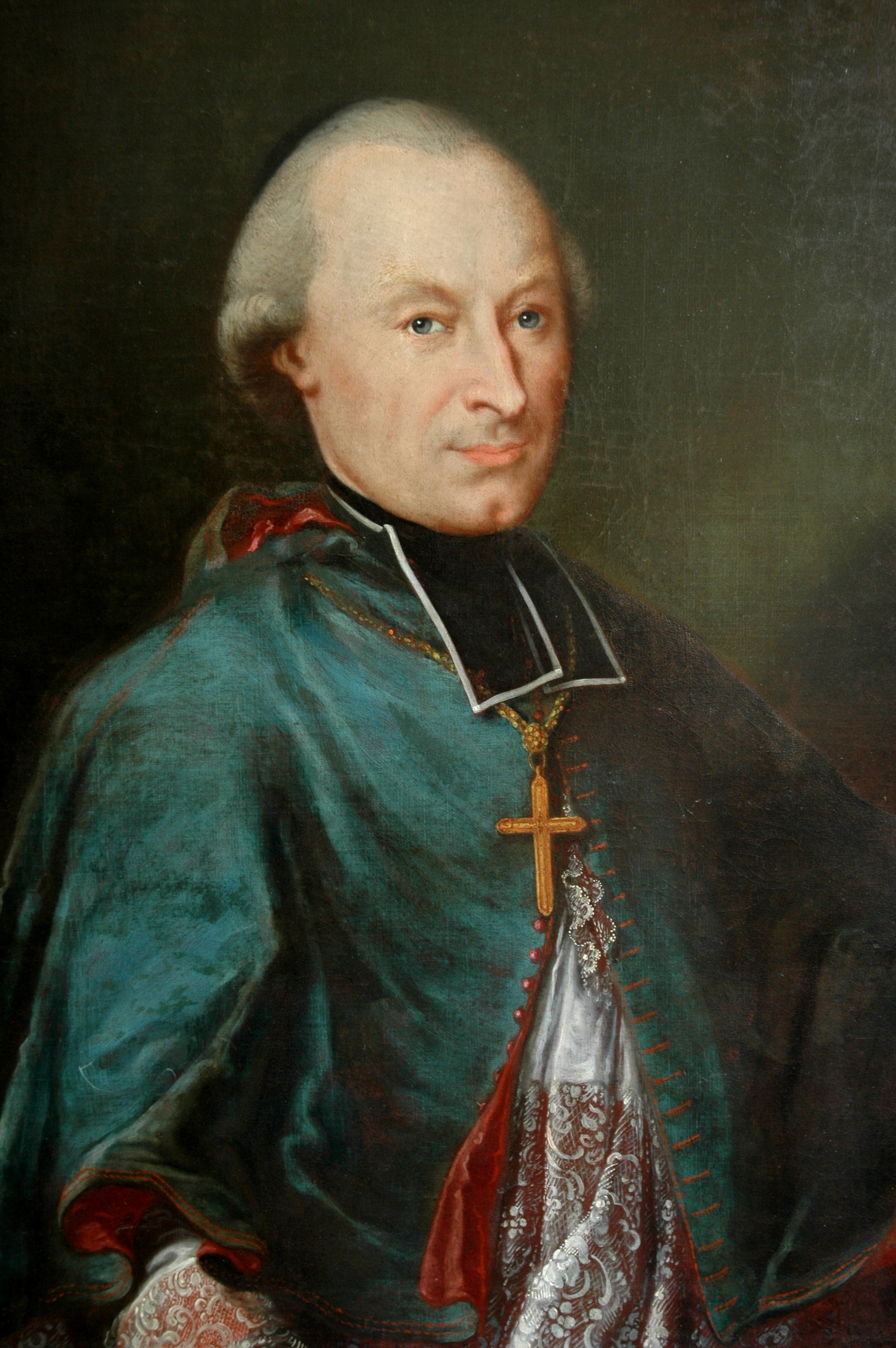
- Church: Catholic Church (until 1791); Constitutional Church (since 1791)
- Diocese: Constitutional Archdiocese of Paris
- In office: 15 August 1798 – 1801
- Predecessor: Archdiocese established
- Successor: Archdiocese suppressed
- Previous posts: Titular Bishop of Lydda (1772-1791); Auxiliary Bishop of Basel (1772-1791)

Orders
- Ordination: 19 December 1750
- Consecration: 22 March 1772 by Joseph-Nicolas de Montenach

Personal details
- Born: 1 September 1727 Thann, Alsace, Kingdom of France
- Died: 13 April 1794 (aged 66) Paris, French Republic

Jean-Baptiste-Joseph Gobel (French: [ʒɑ̃ batist ʒozɛf ɡɔbɛl]; 1 September 1727 – 13 April 1794) was a French Catholic cleric and politician of the Revolution. He was executed during the Reign of Terror.

== Biography ==
Gobel was born in the town of Thann in Alsace to a lawyer to the Sovereign Council of Alsace and tax collector for the Seigneury of Thann. After outstanding success in his early schooling in Porrentruy, he studied at the Jesuit college in Colmar, then theology in the German College in Rome, from which he graduated in 1743.

=== Clerical career ===
Gobel was ordained a Catholic priest in 1750 and then became a member of the cathedral chapter of the Prince-Bishop of Basel, Simon Nikolaus Euseb von Montjoye-Hirsingen, based in Porrentruy, In 1771 he was appointed the auxiliary bishop of the diocese for the section that was situated in French territory, being named by the Holy See as a titular bishop in partibus of Lydda. He consecrated the next Prince-Bishop, Friedrich Ludwig Franz von Wangen zu Geroldseck, on 3 March 1776. Found to have been living beyond his means, he was relieved of his duties by Wangen zu Geroldseck's successor, Franz Joseph Sigismund von Roggenbach, in 1782. After this he began to espouse "reformist" ideas. His political life began when he was elected deputy to the Estates-General of 1789 by the clergy of the Bailiwick of Huningue.

The turning-point of his life was Gobel's action in taking the oath of the Civil Constitution of the Clergy (3 January 1791), in favour of which he had declared himself since 5 May 1790. The document gave the appointment of priests to the electoral assemblies, and, after taking the oath, Gobel had become so popular that he was elected constitutional bishop in several dioceses. He chose the Archbishopric of Paris, and in spite of the difficulties which he had to encounter before he could enter into possession, he took up office on 17 March 1791 and was consecrated on 27 March by eight bishops, including Charles Maurice de Talleyrand. This action was rejected by the Holy See, which has never recognized him as a legitimate holder of the office, and continues to hold the canonical archbishop, Antoine-Eléonore-Léon Le Clerc de Juigné, as the legitimate Archbishop of Paris during that period.

=== Politics ===
On 8 November 1792, Gobel was appointed administrator of Paris. His public display of anti-clericalism was most likely a careful tactic to ensure the sympathy of politicians: among other things, he declared himself opposed to clerical celibacy. On the 17th Brumaire in the year II (7 November 1793), he came before the bar of the National Convention for his activities as civil commissioner in Porrentruy, and, in a famous scene, resigned his episcopal functions, proclaiming that he did so for love of the people, and through respect for their wishes. The previous night, a delegation from the Commune led by Hébert, Chaumette and Cloots had demanded that he publicly renounce his faith or be put to death by the people.

The followers of Jacques Hébert, who were then pursuing their anti-Christian policy, claimed Gobel as their representative. At the same time, Hébert's rival Maximilien Robespierre viewed Gobel as an atheist – although he was not accused of apostasy, and never publicly professed atheism.

Robespierre's vision of a deist Cult of the Supreme Being was threatened by the opposition of atheist Hébertists (see Cult of Reason), and Gobel shared the fate of the latter. Imprisoned, he was found guilty of the so-called 'Luxembourg prison plot' together with Chaumette; Lucile Desmoulins, wife of the recently executed Camille Desmoulins; Françoise Hebert, wife of the recently executed Hébert; and an assortment of other prisoners of various types. Gobel, on being thrown into prison, suffered the agonies of acute remorse. He hastened to do all in his power to repair his misconduct; he sent his written confession to the Abbé Lothringer, and signed the document, not as bishop of Paris, but of Lydda. He entreated the Abbé to give him the benefit of his ministrations in his last moments, to come to the Conciergerie at the time when he was leaving it for the guillotine, and to pronounce over him the form of absolution, not forgetting the clause "ab omni vinculo excommunicationis". Gobel's penitence was likewise attested by the Abbé Emery and the Abbé Gaston de Sambucy.

All of the alleged conspirators were sentenced to death on the morning of 13 April and guillotined that same afternoon.

== Bibliography ==
- 1790 - Opinion de M. l'évêque de Lydda sur le rapport du Comité ecclésiastique concernant l'organisation du clergé. Proposée à l'Assemblée nationale en la séance du mardi premier juin 1790
- 1790 - Lettre de Monsieur l'évêque de Lydda, député d'Alsace, département du Haut-Rhin, écrite a ses commettans, relativement à la déclaration d'une partie de l'Assemblée nationale, sur le décret rendu le 13 avril 1790, concernant la religion
- 1790 - Correspondance du reverend évêque de Lydda, avec ses commettans
- 1791 - Problême intéressant proposé a M. l'Évêque de Lydda [i.e. Jean Baptiste Joseph Gobel]
- 1791 - Mandement de Jean-Baptiste-Joseph Gobet [sic], évêque de Lidda et de Paris, sur la mort d'Honoré Riquetti-Mirabeau
- 1791 - Lettre de Monsieur l'évêque métropolitain de Paris, contenant des vues de pacification sur les troubles actuels de l'Église de France. En réponse à celle de M. Charrier de La Roche, lui annonçant sa démission de l'evêché métropolitain de Rouen
- 1791 - Lettre pastorale de Monsieur l'évêque métropolitain de Paris, au clergé & aux fidèles de son diocèse
- 1791 - Accord des vrais principes de l'Église, de la morale, et de la raison, sur la Constitution civile du clergé de France
- 1792 - Mandement de l'eveque de Paris, portant abolition du Careme, et prorogation du carnaval
- 1793 - Mémoire justificatif pour le citoyen Gobel, évêque métropolitain de Paris

== Notes ==
=== General references ===
  - François Victor Alphonse Aulard, "La Culte de la raison" in the review La Révolution Française (1891).
  - Étienne Charavay, Assemble electorale de Paris (Paris, 1890).
  - H. Monin, La Chanson et l'Eglise sous la Révolution (Paris, 1892).
  - "Episcopat de Gobel" in vol. iii. (1900) of Jean Maurice Tourneux, Bibliographie de l'histoire de Paris pendant la Rév. Fr.

Catholic Church titles
| Preceded by Antoine-Eléonore-Léon Le Clerc de Juigné (Vatican-recognized Archbishop until 1802) | Constitutional Archbishop of Paris; 1791–1794 | Succeeded by Abolished under the French First Republic; Restored 1802: Jean-Baptiste de Belloy |
