= Antoine-Éléonor-Léon Leclerc de Juigné =

French Catholic prelate and politician (1728–1811)

His Grace Antoine-Éléonor-Léon Leclerc de Juigné
- Archbishop of Paris, Duke of Saint-Cloud, Peer of France
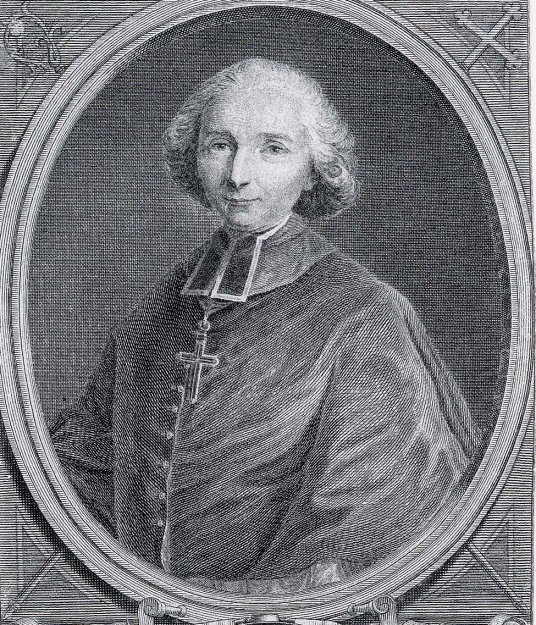
- Portrait engraving of Antoine-Éléonor-Léon Leclerc de Juigné
- Church: Roman Catholic Church
- Archdiocese: Paris
- See: Notre-Dame de Paris
- Installed: 25 February 1782
- Term ended: 31 January 1802
- Predecessor: Christophe de Beaumont
- Successor: Jean Baptiste de Belloy-Morangle
- Other posts: Bishop of Châlons; Vicar-General of Carcassonne

Orders
- Ordination: 30 March 1754
- Consecration: 29 April 1764 by Charles Antoine de La Roche-Aymon

Personal details
- Born: 2 November 1728 Paris, France
- Died: 19 de marzo de 1811 (83 años) Paris, France
- Coat of arms

Deputy to the Estates General and National Constituent Assembly for the First Estate
- In office 30 April 1789 – 30 September 1791
- Constituency: Paris

Antoine-Éléonor-Léon Leclerc de Juigné (2 November 1728 – 19 March 1811) was a French Catholic prelate and politician who served as Archbishop of Paris from 1782 to 1802. He was elected deputy of the clergy to the Estates General of 1789.

== Early life ==
He was the son of Samuel-Jacques Le Clerc de Juigné and Marie Gabrielle Le Cirier de Neufchelles (1706–1763), and younger brother of the Marquis de Juigne. Leclerc de Juigné was descended from an old Maine family. He was barely six years old when he lost his father, Colonel of the Regiment of Orléans, killed in 1734, at the Battle of Guastalla.

The young Leclerc studied the Humanities and Philosophy at the College of Navarre, and entered the seminary of Saint-Nicolas-du-Chardonnet, from there he joined the Society of the Theologians of Navarre, where he made his licentiate and acquired his degrees.

Armand Bazin de Bezons, Bishop of Carcassonne, who was his relative, appointed him as his vicar-general.

Leclerc de Juigne soon had another career; he was appointed general agent of the clergy in 1760. The agency was attached to the care of all ecclesiastical interests and affairs. This management lasted five years but ceased if, during his course, the agent was appointed to a bishopric. It was not long after his appointment when, on 16 November 1763, the Diocese of Comminges was proposed to him to replace Antoine de Lastic, who had been transferred to the Diocese of Châlons. He declined, preferring to continue his honorable work.

== Bishop of Châlons ==
Owing to the sudden death of Antoine de Lastic, he was appointed Bishop of Châlons.

On arrival, he found difficulties occasioned by the ascendancy which Jansenism had taken under his predecessor, "he thought himself obliged to forbid and even to expel" some difficult priests. After reconstructing the major seminary, he established a lesser seminary to accommodate children of the countryside who aspired to study for the priesthood.

He knew all the ecclesiastics of his diocese, received them with benevolence, was always ready to listen to them, and to enter with them in the minutest details on what concerned the good of the parishes, the salvation of souls, and the relief to be carried where it was needed. His alms immortalized him in the diocese of Châlons, and his memory will long be blessed.
– Michaud, Ancient and Modern World Biography, 1843, 2nd Edition

In 1776, in the middle of the night, a town distant from Châlons of twelve or fourteen leagues broke out in flames. Leclerc rushed towards the blaze and found Saint-Dizier heavily burned. In hopes of saving some of the victims, he charged into the flames with little precaution and was thought to have suffocated. Upon news reaching Châlons, consternation persisted until his return. These accidents, much too frequent in Champagne, moved the charitable prelate to establish at Châlons an office of relief, one of the first assurances against fires.

Persuaded that a considerable increase of revenue was not in the spirit of the canons, a motive for changing his post, he refused the Archdiocese of Auch.

== Archbishop of Paris ==
The death of Christophe de Beaumont, Archbishop of Paris left this seat vacant. The Bishop of Autun, who was then in possession of the "profit sheet," wished to nominate the Archbishop of Toulouse, Lomenie de Brienne, but Louis XVI objected, "The Archbishop of Paris should at least believe in God", and on 22 December 1781 appointed Leclerc de Juigné, despite the objections of other competitors. Holding true to his belief in modesty, the Bishop yielded only to the encouragement and repeated orders of the King, who saw in his choice the interest of religion.

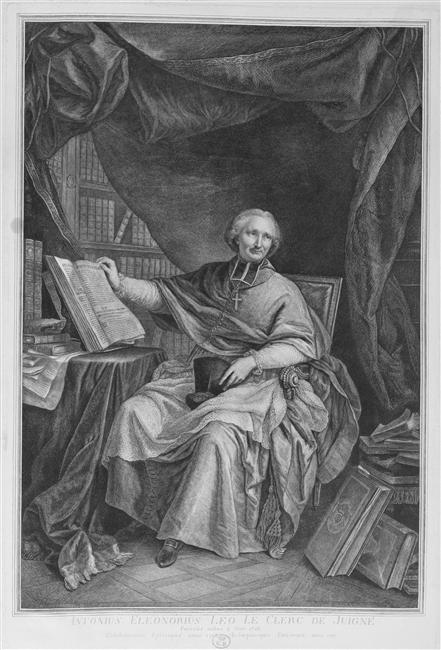
Archbishop Juigné in 1781

De Juigne carried in his new diocese the same spirit, the same principles according to which he had governed that of Châlons, "the same prudence, the same moderation, the same gentleness, the same attention to maintain the peace, to try to maintain it between the priesthood and the magistracy; even zeal for ecclesiastical discipline and sound doctrine; even munificence towards the poor, his immense income was employed in alms, in good works, in pious institutions."

He spent most of the income of his new diocese on charity. Considerable as this income was, it could not meet the needs of the harsh winter of 1788–89. The prelate made up for this by selling his dishes, by committing his patrimony, and by taking large loans, for the guarantee of which the Marquis de Juigné, his elder brother, was forced to pay the sum of a hundred-thousand crowns.

His zeal for all that tended to the progress of the ecclesiastical sciences had made him conceive a plan for a school to train priests. This plan had begun execution at Calvaire, under the direction of the Bishop of Senez, Jean Baptiste de Beauvais. The Revolution of 1789 prevented its completion.

In the Parlement of Paris he voted, on 9 January 1788, for the edict which restored to Protestants their civil status.

== French Revolution ==
On 30 April 1789, the clergy of Paris elected him deputy to the Estates General. His two brothers were also called there.

The Archbishop of Paris sat, "in these stormy assemblies, with the minority faithful to God and to the King." He opposed the meeting of the three orders, and on 19 June proposed:

1. to verify the powers of the clergy chamber and its constitution in an active chamber;
2. to persevere in the pure and simple adhesion of the conciliatory plan proposed by the commissioners of the King;
3. to communicate the present deliberation to the orders of the Third Estate and the nobility;
4. to send a deputation to the King to implore him to occupy himself, in his wisdom, with the means of establishing a correspondence between the three orders of the Estates General.

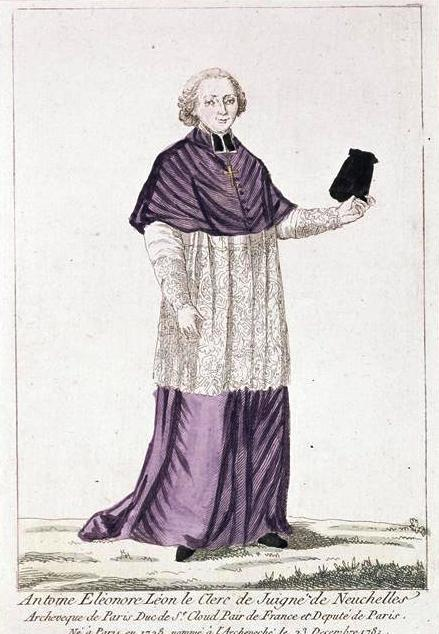
Watercolor engraving of Juigné as a deputy to the Estates General

Resulting at 135 votes approving this proposal, 127 voted in opposition, and 12 more joined with reservations. The motion, defeated by four votes of majority, made Archbishop Juigné very unpopular. On 24 June, as he was leaving the Assembly at Versailles, his carriage was attacked by — allegedly — people who he had given food some months prior. On the 27th he agreed to meet with the Third Estate, and his accession was hailed by the general acclamations of the assembly.

At the end of the night of 4 August he proposed to sing a "Te Deum" of rejoicing, and on the 11th, he renounced the ecclesiastical tithes:

In the name of my confreres, in the name of my co-operators, and of all the clergy who belong to this august Assembly, we are giving ecclesiastical tithes to the hands of a just and generous nation. May the Gospel be proclaimed, may divine worship be celebrated with decency and dignity, may the churches be provided with virtuous and zealous priests; that the poor of the people are helped, this is the destination of our tithes, that is the end of our ministry and our vows. We entrust ourselves to the National Assembly, and we have no doubt that it will afford us the means to honor worthily and equally sacred objects.

On 20 September, he offered the silverware of the churches, and on 14 April 1790, sent to the assembly his civic oath.

== Emigration ==
Then, alarmed by the course of events, and no longer doubting that all was lost, he obtained permission from the King to leave France.

He first sought asylum in Chambéry, Duchy of Savoy.

From Savoy, he published an order against the election of Jean-Baptiste-Joseph Gobel as constitutional Archbishop of Paris, and was denounced by the departmental directory of Paris on 31 March 1791. He was further reproached for continuing to appoint canons to the new canonicas, despite having emigrated.

De Juigné then passed to Konstanz, where he was joined by several bishops and a great many "faithful" priests obliged to leave France. He helped them first with his purse, the sale of the few precious effects which remained to him, even of his chapel, then of the gifts which he had received from Catherine II of Russia and of princes and great prelates of Germany. He even found means of establishing a seminary in Konstanz, where young clerics were formed to replace the priests decimated by the revolutionary fury.

From Schaffhausen, he was accused by the National Convention on 15 March 1795 of directing Austrian espionage against France.

The success of the French armies in the French Revolutionary Wars obliged him in 1799 to leave this residence and accept asylum in Augsburg, offered to him by Clemens Wenceslaus of Saxony, Elector of Trier.

== Return to France ==
He returned to Paris in 1802 after the promulgation of the Napoleonic Concordat, and without difficulty, resigned his archdiocese at the request of Pope Pius VII on 31 January 1802.

Juigné then lived in retirement among his family, beloved by his old diocesans, limiting his pleasures to solitary walks. He visited by his successor at Paris, Jean-Baptiste de Belloy, in the palace formerly his own, where both exercised respect and maintained the best relations.

On 21 March 1808, Napoleon named him canon of the Imperial chapter of Saint-Denis, and created him Count of the Empire on 7 June 1808.

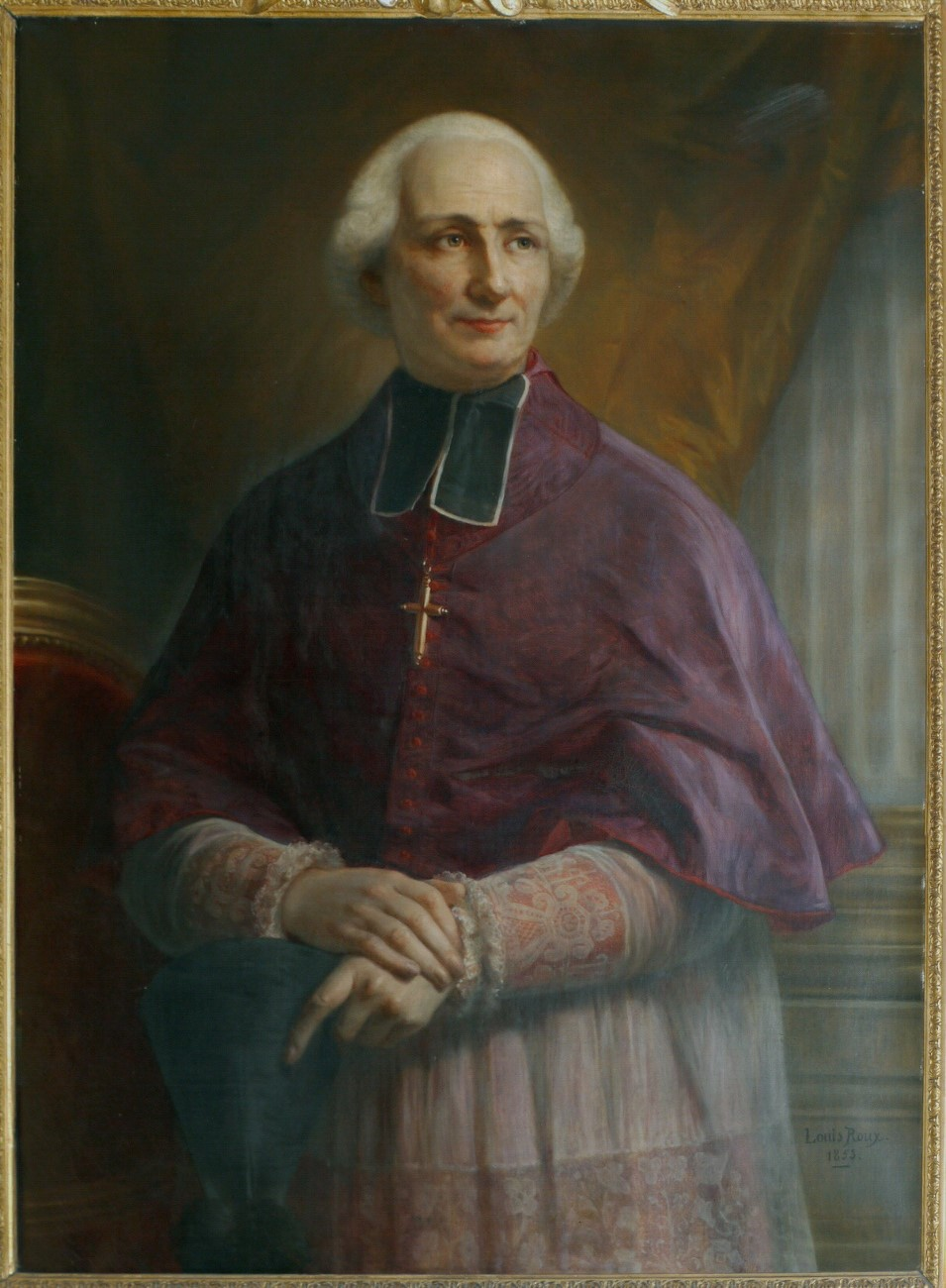
Posthumous portrait of Antoine Leclerc de Juigné

He died in Paris on 19 March 1811, in his 83rd year, and was buried in a common grave. In the service which the metropolitan chapter gave him, Abbot Jallabert, vicar-general, pronounced his funeral oration. On the king's return, the chapter, with permission, had de Juigné's body exhumed and transported to the vault of the Cathedral of Notre-Dame.

"His principles were pure, his zeal equally removed from slackening and exaggeration, his mind unceasingly occupied with that which could serve the Church." He joined in the happiest memory the love of serious studies, and had a taste for good literature. He was fluent in Greek, the Bible was his favorite reading, he knew it by heart, and any passage quoted to him, he indicated at once the book, chapter, and verse.

A monument was erected to him and his brother, the Marquis de Juigné, in Notre-Dame de Paris.

== Bibliography ==
- (in French) Louis Amable Victor Lambert. Vie de Messire Antoine Éléonore Léon Leclerc de Juigné, archevêque de Paris, duc et pair de France, et ancien évêque de Châlons-sur-Marne. Paris, chez A. Le Clere, 1823.

Catholic Church titles
Preceded by Christophe de Beaumont	Archbishop of Paris; 1781–1802	Succeeded by (Jean-Baptiste-Joseph Gobel, Constitutional Archbishop 1791-94); Jean-Baptiste de Belloy
