= Duke of Saint-Cloud =

The title of Duke of Saint-Cloud was created in 1674. The intention behind the creation was to provide a noble title to be held by the Archbishop of Paris for the time being.

The Bishop of Paris had only received the title Archbishop in relatively recent times, on October 20, 1622, so as to recognize the emergence of Paris as the royal capital. It was common enough in France for a number of bishoprics to be joined automatically to a noble title. There were, for example, the Bishop-Count of Beauvais, the Bishop-Count of Châlons and the Bishop-Count of Noyon.

In this way, the incumbents of three ancient bishoprics in the kingdom had along with the title of the ecclesiastical see also the secular noble title of Duke and peer of France, the latter being a particularly high distinction for a restricted circle of the nobility.

The three cases prior to 1674 were the Archbishop of Rheims and the Bishops of Laon and Langres. To these was added, then, the case of the archbishopric of Paris. In the existing cases, the title of the dukedom was the same as the bishopric. Presumably in the case of Paris, it seemed inappropriate for the bishop of the royal capital be Duke of Paris and so the dukedom or duchy created was given an alternative name.

So it was that in 1674 the domain and lordships of Saint-Cloud, Maisons-Alfort, Créteil, Ozoir-la-Ferrière, and Armentières-en-Brie were erected into a duchy of Saint-Cloud, although the title was not registered in the parlement until 1690. The first to bear the title was François de Harlay de Champvalon, who had been Archbishop since 1671. It was then held by his successors at Paris till the Revolution.

These four dukedoms, not being hereditary, did not become extinct on the death of the holder, but were assumed by the legitimate successor to the bishopric.

However, all four dukedoms or duchies, along with the entire Peerage of France, were abolished during the French Revolution, on August 4, 1789, the Night of the Abolition of Feudalism.

== Dukes of Saint-Cloud ==
- François de Harlay de Champvalon (1625-1695), 1st Duke of Saint-Cloud (1671-1695)
- Louis-Antoine, Cardinal de Noailles (1651-1729), 2nd Duke of Saint-Cloud (1695-1729)
- Charles-Gaspard-Guillaume de Vintimille du Luc (1655-1746), 3rd Duke of Saint-Cloud (1729-1746)
- Jacques Bonne-Gigault de Bellefonds (1698-1746), 4th Duke of Saint-Cloud (1746)
- Christophe de Beaumont du Repaire (1703-1781), 5th Duke of Saint-Cloud (1746-1781)
- Antoine-Eléonore-Léon Le Clerc de Juigné (1728-1811), 6th Duke of Saint-Cloud (1781-1789)
