= Youri Boutsko =

Youri Markovitch Boutsko Юрий Маркович Буцко
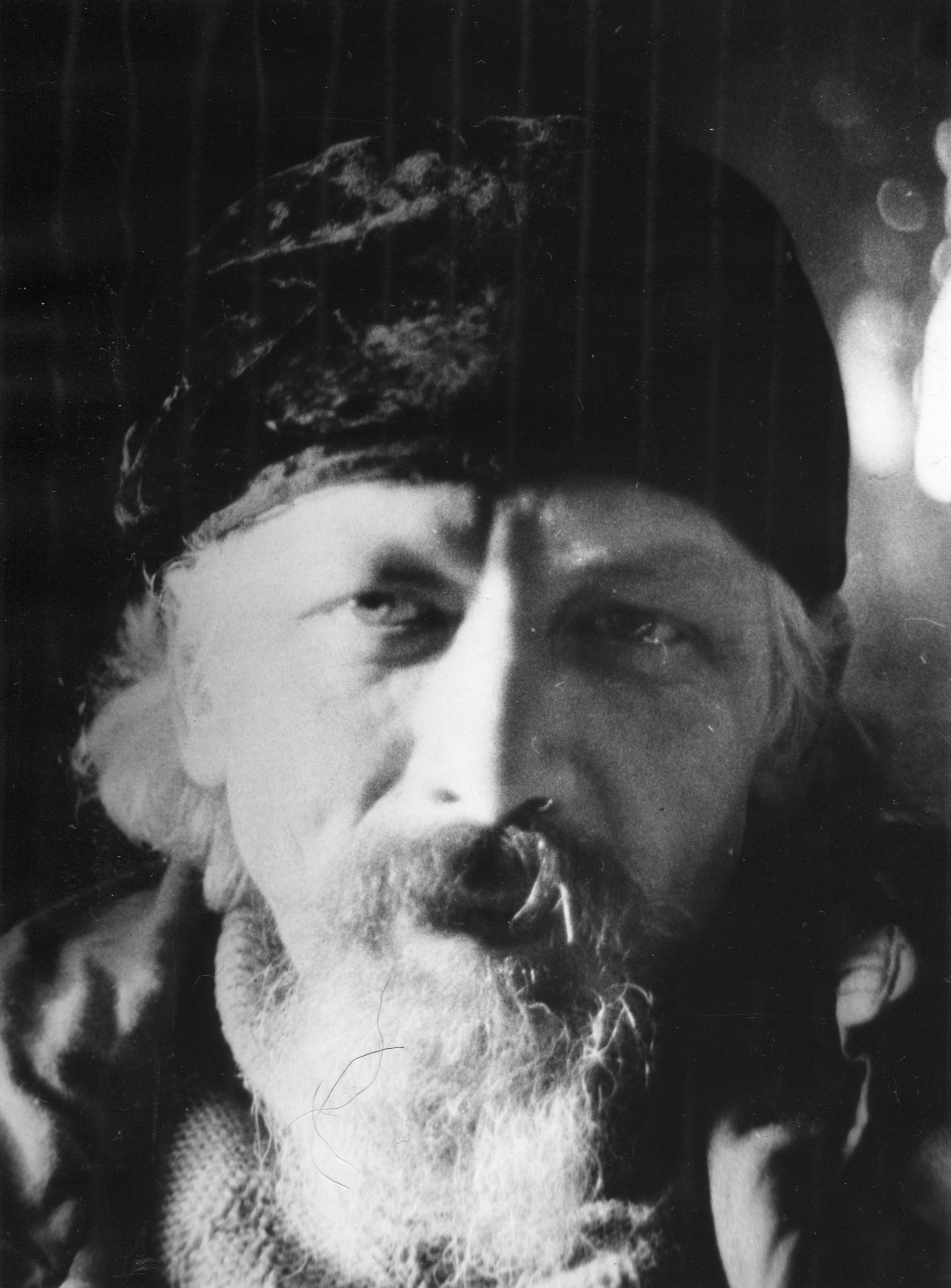

Background information
- Born: May 28, 1938
- Died: April 25, 2015
- Genres: Classical
- Occupation: Composer
- Labels: Natives

Youri Boutsko (Russian: Юрий Маркович Буцко; Youri Markovitch Boutsko; 18 May 1938 - 25 April 2015) was a Russian composer and professor of the Moscow State Tchaikovsky Conservatory from 1968 to 2015.

Youri Boutsko is known as an author of vocal, instrumental and chamber music as well as of music for theater and cinema. He wrote 4 Operas, 2 Oratorios, 7 Cantatas, 13 Symphonies and 18 Concertos for different instruments.

The musical language of Youri Boutsko was deeply inspired by Russian musical tradition, in particular — by works of Modest Mussorgsky and Nikolai Rimsky-Korsakov. On the other hand, his music is based on the traditional Christian Orthodox liturgy: the composer often uses either themes that remind of the Znamenny chant, or its real citations.
