= Louis Antoine de Noailles =

17th and 18th-century French Catholic cardinal

His Eminence Louis Antoine de Noailles COHS
- Cardinal, Archbishop of Paris, Duke of Saint-Cloud, Peer of France
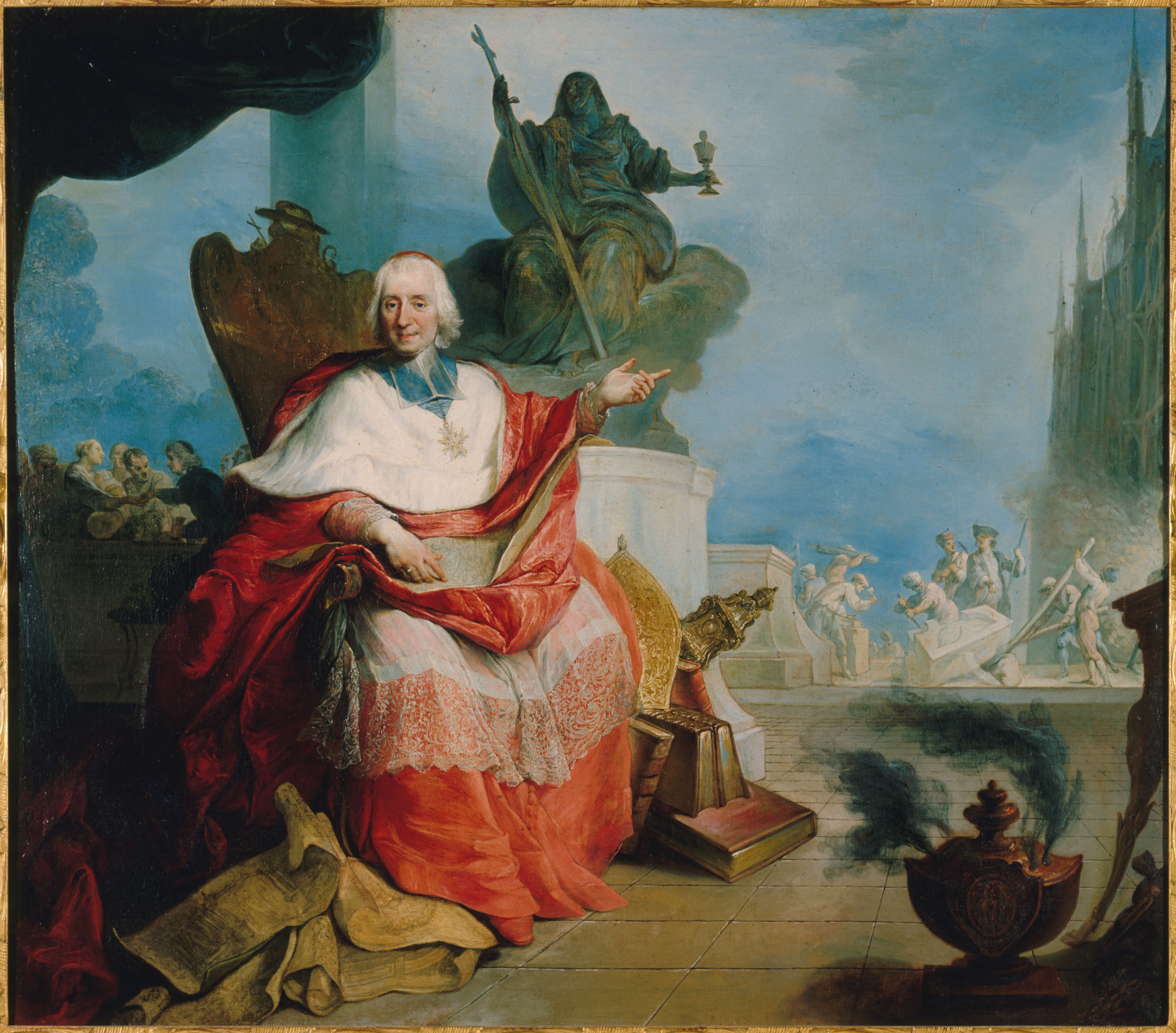
- Church: Roman Catholic Church
- Archdiocese: Paris
- See: Notre-Dame de Paris
- Installed: 19 September 1695
- Term ended: 4 May 1729
- Predecessor: François de Harlay de Champvallon
- Successor: Charles-Gaspard-Guillaume de Vintimille du Luc
- Other posts: Bishop of Cahors; Bishop of Châlons

Personal details
- Born: 27 May 1651 Château de Teyssiére, Auvergne, France
- Died: 4 May 1729 (aged 77) Paris, France
- Education: College of Sorbonne, Paris
- Coat of arms

Louis Antoine de Noailles, Cardinal de Noailles (27 May 1651 – 4 May 1729), second son of Anne de Noailles, 1st Duke of Noailles, was a French bishop and cardinal. His signing of the Unigenitus bull in 1728 would end the formal Jansenist controversy.

== Biography ==
Louis-Antoine de Noailles was born at the Château of Teyssiére in Auvergne, France, on 27 May 1651 to Anne, 1st duc de Noailles and captain- general of Roussillon, and his wife, Louise Boyer, a former lady-in-waiting to Queen Anne of Austria.

Noailles received his doctorate in theology from the Sorbonne on 14 March 1676. He was appointed bishop of Cahors in March 1679 but served only briefly before Pope Innocent XI ordered him transferred in 1680 to head the diocese of Châlons-sur-Marne, which made him a peer of France. On 19 August 1695, in recognition of Noailles's family connections, King Louis XIV made him archbishop of Paris and Duke of Saint-Cloud, and in 1700 Pope Innocent XII made him a cardinal.

According to Antoine Degert, writing in the Catholic Encyclopedia, although Noailles was not brilliant, "he was possessed of piety, zeal, and activity." He is noted for having raised money to feed famine victims by selling his silver tableware in 1709, and for having spent a considerable part of his inheritance on redecorating Notre Dame.

Noailles was a friend of François Fénelon, with whom he had studied at the Collège du Plessis before entering the Sorbonne. Nonetheless, he was among the bishops who condemned Fénelon's Maximes des Saints, ending the theologian's career.

Noailles came to know the controversial young Lutheran Count Nicholas Ludwig von Zinzendorf in 1719 during the young man's Grand Tour. The two found great spiritual connection despite their historic denominational differences. They maintained a relationship and correspondence the rest of Noailles' life; and Noailles became a member of Zinzendorf's Order of the Grain of Mustard Seed, a secret society where nobles and church leaders committed to work together to build the spiritual Kingdom of God. The Cardinal also served as Godfather to Zinzendorf's son Christian Renatus (1727–1756).

Noailles acted as a staunch moralist when at the end of March 1719 he firmly stood behind the curé of Saint-Sulpice. who refused to administer the sacraments to the Regent's daughter, Louise Élisabeth, Duchess of Berry, who was in a critical condition giving birth to an illegitimate child in the Palais de Luxembourg. Despite all the pleas of the Regent, Philip II, Duke of Orleans, Noailles refused categorically to overturn the decision of the parish priest.

Noailles had a complex relationship with the Jansenists; while he condemned their propositions, more orthodox theologians saw in his own teachings hints of Jansenism, and Noailles was an opponent of the Jesuits in their attacks on the sect. His position on Pope Clement XI's 1713 bull Unigenitus was also controversial; he opposed it, despite papal disapproval, up to 1728 but then abruptly reversed himself shortly before his death.

He was succeeded as archbishop of Paris and Duke of Saint-Cloud by Charles-Gaspard-Guillaume de Vintimille du Luc.

== Sources ==
Catholic Church titles
Preceded by François de Harlay de Champvallon	Archbishop of Paris; 1695–1729	Succeeded by Charles-Gaspard-Guillaume de Vintimille du Luc
