= Jacques-Bonne Gigault de Bellefonds =

French prelate

His Grace Jacques-Bonne Gigault de Bellefonds
- Archbishop of Paris, Duke of Saint-Cloud, Peer of France
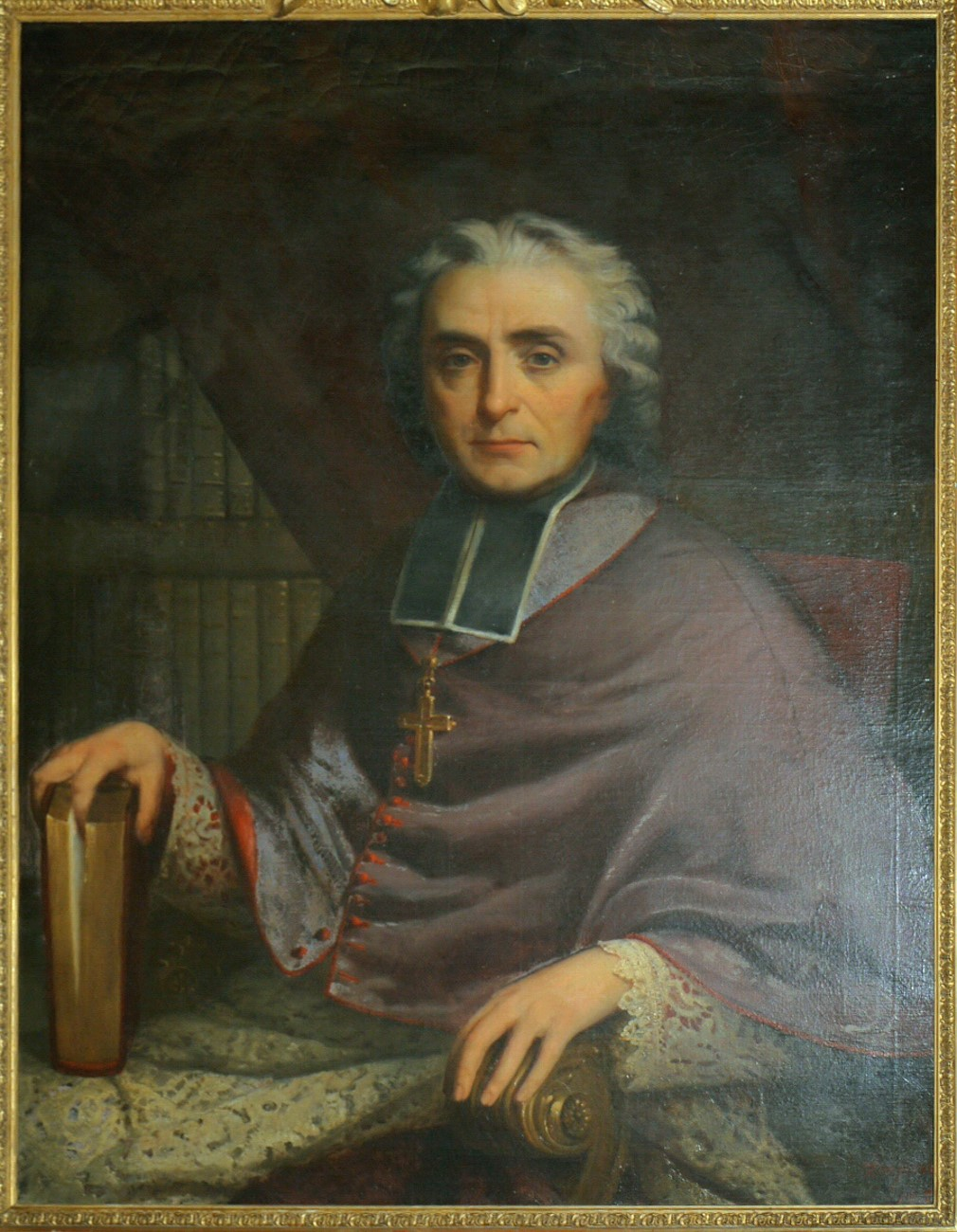
- Church: Roman Catholic Church
- Archdiocese: Paris
- See: Notre-Dame de Paris
- Installed: 2 May 1746
- Term ended: 20 July 1746
- Predecessor: Charles-Gaspard-Guillaume de Vintimille du Luc
- Successor: Christophe de Beaumont
- Other posts: Archbishop of Arles; Bishop of Bayonne

Personal details
- Born: 1 May 1698 Beaumont-la-Ronce, France
- Died: 20 July 1746 (aged 48) Paris, France
- Coat of arms

Jacques-Bonne Gigault de Bellefonds (1698–1746) was a French prelate who was Archbishop of Arles from 1741 to 1746.

== Biography ==
Jacques-Bonne Gigault de Bellefonds was born at the Château de Montifray, near Beaumont-la-Ronce, on 1 May 1698.

He was appointed Bishop of Bayonne on 8 October 1735. Pope Clement XII confirmed this appointment on 27 February 1736 and Cardinal Melchior de Polignac, Archbishop of Auch, consecrated de Bellefonds as a bishop on 25 March 1736. On 20 August 1741 he was appointed Archbishop of Arles, with Pope Benedict XIV confirming the appointment on 20 December 1741.

De Bellefonds was appointed Archbishop of Paris on 4 March 1746, with Benedict XIV confirming the appointment on 2 May 1746. He died in Paris of smallpox only months after becoming Archbishop, on 20 July 1746.

His career was marked by his opposition to Jansenism within the Catholic Church in France. Shortly before his death from smallpox, he had denounced Denis Diderot's Pensées philosophiques.

Catholic Church titles
Preceded by Charles-Gaspard-Guillaume de Vintimille du Luc	Archbishop of Paris; 1746	Succeeded by Christophe de Beaumont
