= Jean-Baptiste de Belloy =

French Archbishop of Paris and cardinal

His Eminence Jean-Baptiste de Belloy
- Cardinal, Archbishop of Paris, Count of the Empire
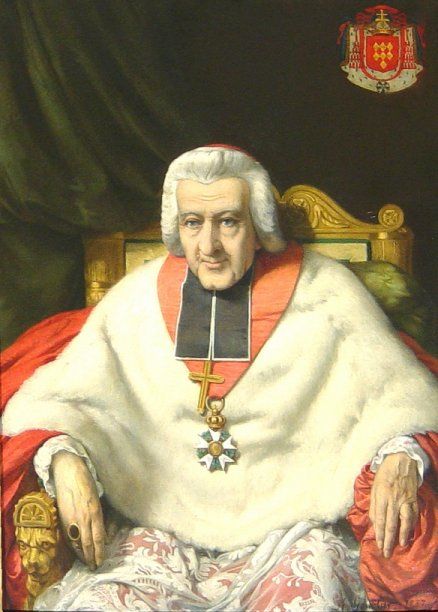
- Portrait of Jean-Baptiste de Belloy
- Church: Roman Catholic Church
- Archdiocese: Paris
- See: Paris
- Installed: 10 April 1802
- Term ended: 10 June 1808
- Predecessor: Antoine-Eléonore-Léon Le Clerc de Juigné
- Successor: Jean-Sifrein Maury
- Other post: Cardinal-Priest of San Giovanni a Porta Latina (1805-08)
- Previous posts: Bishop of Glandèves (1751-55); Bishop of Marseille (1755-91)

Orders
- Ordination: 19 December 1733
- Consecration: 30 January 1752 by Étienne-René Potier de Gesvres
- Created cardinal: 17 January 1803 by Pope Pius VII
- Rank: Cardinal-Priest

Personal details
- Born: Jean-Baptiste de Belloy-Morangle; 9 October 1709 Morangles, Kingdom of France
- Died: 10 June 1808 (aged 98) Paris, First French Empire
- Denomination: Catholic (Roman Rite)
- Education: College of Sorbonne
- Coat of arms

Jean-Baptiste Count de Belloy (French pronunciation: [ʒɑ̃ batist də bɛlwa]; 9 October 1709, Morangles, Diocese of Beauvais – 10 June 1808, Paris) was an Archbishop of Paris and cardinal of the Catholic Church.

== Biography ==
Belloy was born in the small village of Morangles, near Senlis, on 9 October 1709. He had two brothers, Jacques-Tranquille, who became a Premonstratensian Canon, and was appointed Abbot of Corneux (diocese of Besançon) by King Louis XV in 1756; the other, also a religious, became Prior of Bellozane and then of Abbecourt (diocese of Chartres).

Although of an ancient family of military fame, young Belloy preferred an ecclesiastical career, made his classical and theological studies at Paris, where he was ordained a priest and received the degree of Doctor of Theology in 1737. In the ministry he shone more by his virtue than by his learning. In 1749, he was named Abbot Commendatory of Saint-André de Villeneuve (Avignon).

The Bishop of Bourges, Léon Potier de Gesvres, appointed him Vicar General of the diocese and Archdeacon, Canon, and Prebendary of his cathedral.

=== Bishop ===
On 20 December 1751 he was appointed Bishop of Glandèves. He was consecrated a bishop in Paris, at the seminary of Saint-Sulpice, on 30 January 1752, by Bishop Potier de Gesvres. He took his oath of allegiance to King Louis XV on 5 February 1752.

Belloy participated as a delegate from the ecclesiastical province of Embrun in the famous Assembly of the French Clergy of 1755, which began on 25 May and concluded on 4 November. On 10 June the news reached the Assembly that the Bishop of Marseille had died, and on 22 June the King nominated Belloy the new bishop. The purpose of the assembly was traditionally to bring the clergy to offer the King a subsidy of their own free will to meet the expenses of the royal government. Louis XV now proposed to turn the free grant into an annual tax of 5%, and to make that possible, he demanded a general survey of the value of all ecclesiastical benefices in France. Many delegates were intransigent defenders of their traditional practices, and their own pocketbooks, and fought against the King's proposals. Others wished to be more accommodating to the royal will. Most of the time of the Assembly, however, was spent on spiritual and doctrinal matters, arising out of the Jansenist controversy and the papal Bull Unigenitus. Belloy took sides with the moderate party (Feuillants), led by Cardinal Frédéric-Jérôme de la Rochefoucauld, the President of the Assemblée du Clergé, and contributed to the restoration of tranquility in the Church of France.

Dissensions occasioned by the papal bull Unigenitus (8 September 1713) had become so great in the Diocese of Marseilles that, upon the death of its bishop, Henri François Xavier de Belsunce de Castelmoron, there was imminent danger of schism. Belloy was transferred to Marseille by Pope Benedict XIV on 4 August 1755; he gained the confidence of both parties, as well as the competing factions of Jesuits and Dominicans, and restored peace.

On 13 October 1762, on petition of his Promoter-General, Canon Long, Bishop Belloy issued a decree reminding his clergy, both secular and religious, of the Statute of the diocese of Marseille against the attendance of the clergy at the circus or coliseum.

On 5 November 1766, Belloy resigned his Abbey of Saint-André de Villeneuve, and was named Abbot Commendatory of the Abbey of Cormeilles (diocese of Lisieux). This was an exchange of benefices, a lesser for a richer.

=== Revolution ===
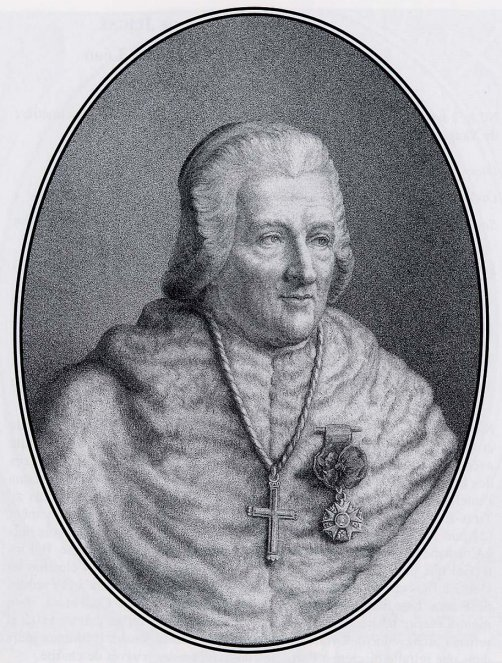
Archbishop de Belloy at a younger age

In July 1790, the National Assembly decreed the suppression of the Diocese of Marseilles. Belloy sent to the assembly a letter of protest against the suppression of one of the oldest episcopal sees of France. He celebrated Mass for the last time in the cathedral on 31 August 1790, and then retired to Chambly, a little town near his birthplace, where he remained during the most critical period of the Revolution. When Pope Pius VII decided that the French bishops should tender their resignation in order to facilitate the conclusion of the Concordat of 1801, he was the first to comply, on 21 September 1801, setting the example which exercised great influence over the other bishops, since he was the senior bishop in the French hierarchy.

=== Archbishop and cardinal ===
Napoleon, highly pleased with this act of devotion to church and state, appointed the nonagenarian bishop to the See of Paris. He was immediately given canonical institution by the papal legate, Cardinal Giovanni Battista Caprara, and he officially took possession of the diocese on 12 April 1802. Notwithstanding his extreme age, he governed his new diocese with astonishing vigour and intelligence. His first task was to reconstruct the chapter of the cathedral of Notre Dame de Paris, which he did by an edict of 7 May 1802. Only three of his new canons and one vicar general had taken the oath. On the same day he began the reorganization of the parishes of the diocese inside the city limits, and on 17 May those outside Paris. Of the twelve parish priests inside Paris, three had taken the oath to the Civil Constitution of the Clergy of 1790. Of the 68 priests of parishes outside Paris, 55 had taken the oath. Belloy announced his belief that his priests had ceased functioning and were inactive during the decade of the constitutional church, and they were therefore reinstated. He had little choice. He then began a systematic canonical visitation of each parish in the diocese, to inspect its current spiritual and physical condition.

On 16 August 1802, Belloy was nominated a member of the General Council for the Administration of Hospitals and Shelters of Paris by the emperor. On 14 September 1802 he was appointed a senator of the French Republic.

At the specific request of Napoleon I, Belloy was promoted to the rank of cardinal of the Holy Roman Church by Pope Pius VII in the consistory of 17 January 1803. The emperor personally presented him with the red biretta at the Tuileries on 27 March 1803. Pius VII personally placed the cardinal's galero on his head at a consistory held in the Grand Salon of the Archbishop's Palace in Paris on 1 February 1805. He was assigned the titular church of San Giovanni a Porta Latina in Rome. On 2 October 1803, Belloy have been named a Member of the Legion of Honor, then Grand-Officer (1804), and then Grand-Eagle (1805)

He restored the Crown of Thorns (10 August 1806) to its place of honour in the Sainte Chapelle.

On 27 January 1807 the cardinal issued an order, fixing the number of canons at Notre Dame at nineteen members, including the three vicars general. He also appointed an archpriest, who was to be a canon as well. On 20 May he established the archives for parishes, to which the priests were to make annual statistical reports.

On 1 March 1808, Belloy was named a count of the French Empire.

Belloy died in Paris at the Archiepiscopal Palace on Friday, 10 June 1808, at the age of ninety-eight years and eight months.

Belloy was buried on 25 June in the Chapelle Saint-Marcel in Notre Dame, where the monument erected by Napoleon in his honour, the work of Pierre Deseine, is one of the finest in the cathedral.

== See also ==
- Cafetière du Belloy

== Bibliography ==
- Fisquet, Honoré (1864). La France pontificale: Metropole d'Aix: Digne, 1re partie: Digne et Riez (Paris: Étienne Repos 1864), pp. 344–359.
- Fisquet, Honoré (1864). La France pontificale: Paris (in French). Vol. Paris: Tome premier. Paris: E. Repos. pp. 542–556.
- François-Xavier de Feller, Biographie universelle, II, 199.

Catholic Church titles
Preceded by Antoine-Éléonor-Léon Leclerc de Juigné (Jean-Baptiste-Joseph Gobel, Constitutional Archbishop, 1791-94)	Archbishop of Paris; 1802–1808	Succeeded by Jean-Sifrein Maury
Records
Preceded by Francesco Maria Banditi	Oldest living Member of the Sacred College; 27 January 1796 – 10 June 1808	Succeeded by Francesco Carafa di Trajetto
