= François de Harlay de Champvallon =

French archbishop

His Grace François de Harlay de Champvallon
- Archbishop of Paris, Duke of Saint-Cloud, Peer of France
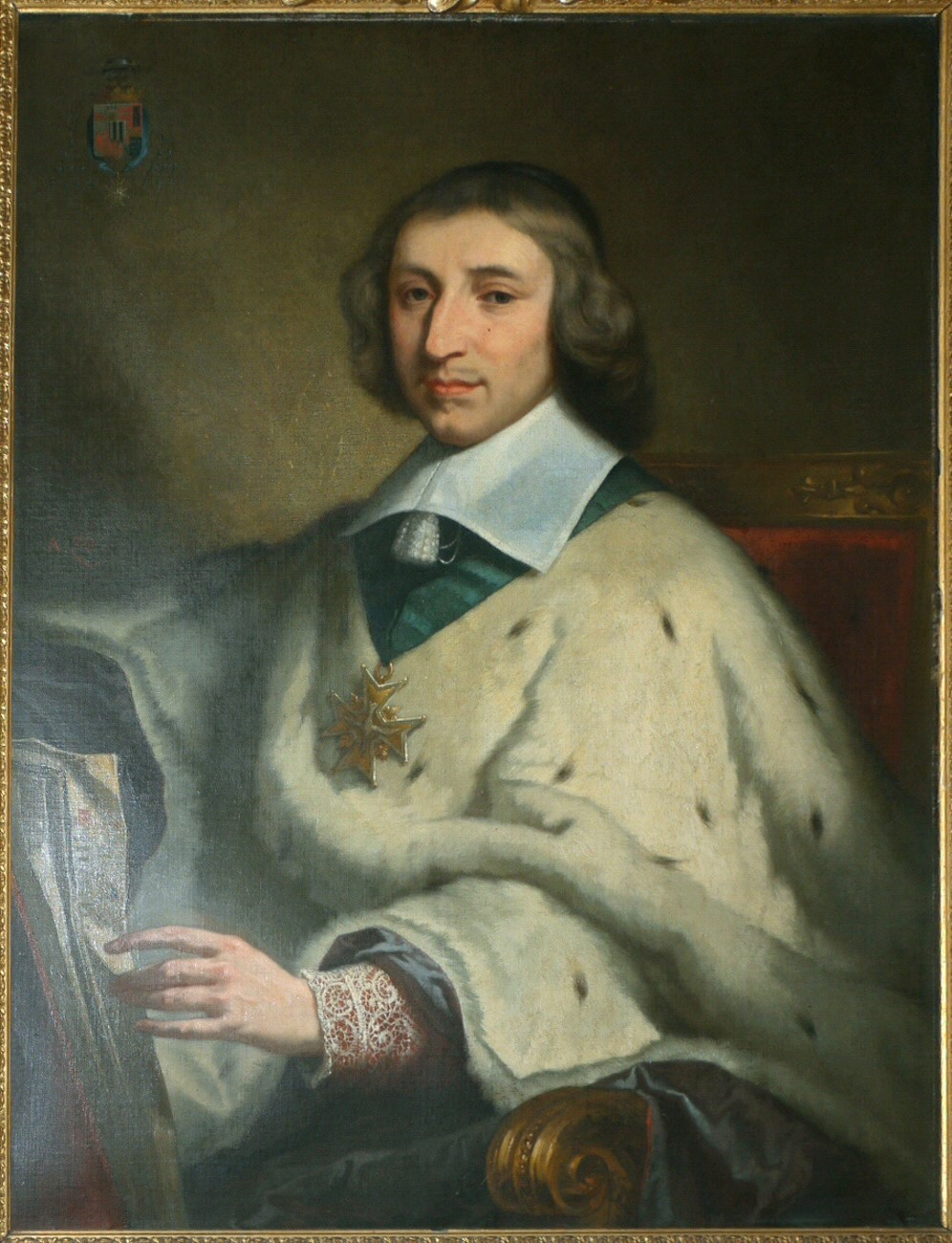
- Church: Roman Catholic Church
- Archdiocese: Paris
- See: Notre-Dame de Paris
- Installed: 23 February 1671
- Term ended: 6 August 1695
- Predecessor: Hardouin de Péréfixe de Beaumont
- Successor: Louis-Antoine de Noailles
- Other post: Archbishop of Rouen

Personal details
- Born: 14 August 1625 Paris, France
- Died: 6 August 1695 (aged 69) Paris, France
- Education: College of Navarre, Paris
- Coat of arms

François de Harlay de Champvallon (French: [fʁɑ̃swa də aʁlɛ də ʃɑ̃valɔ̃]; François III de Harlay; 14 August 1625 – 6 August 1695) was the fifth Archbishop of Paris.

== Life ==
=== Early years ===
Harlay de Champvallon was born in Paris, the nephew of François de Harlay, archbishop of Rouen. He was presented to the abbey of Jumièges immediately on leaving the Collège de Navarre, and he was only twenty-six when he succeeded his uncle in the archiepiscopal see. He was transferred to the see of Paris in 1671. In 1674 the domain and lordships of Saint-Cloud, Maisons-Alfort, Créteil, Ozoir-la-Ferrière, and Armentières-en-Brie were erected into a duchy of Saint-Cloud to be held by the successive Archbishops of Paris, although it was not registered in the parlement until 1690. Harlay was the first to bear the title, which was then held by his successors at Paris till the Revolution. The Duke was likewise a pair of France. Harlay was also commander of the chivalric Order of the Holy Spirit and a member of the Académie française. In 1690 he was proposed by the king for the cardinalate, though this did not have effect.

=== Career ===
During the early part of his political career he was a firm adherent of Mazarin, and is said to have helped to procure his return from exile. His private life gave rise to much scandal, but he had considerable learning, was an eloquent and persuasive speaker and had a great capacity for business. He secured the favour of Louis XIV by his support for the claims of the Gallican Church formulated by the declaration made by the clergy in assembly on 19 March 1682, when Bossuet accused him of truckling to the court like a valet.

Though no official act has survived, it is reliably thought that Harlay officiated in a private ceremony at the king's marriage with Madame de Maintenon after a Mass celebrated by Père la Chaise, the king's confessor, and in the presence of only three witnesses, the Marquis de Montchevreuil, the Chevalier de Forbin and Alexandre Bontemps. Harlay was hated by the bride for using his influence with the king to keep the matter secret.

He had a weekly audience of Louis XIV in company with Père la Chaise on the affairs of the Church in Paris, but his influence gradually declined, and Henri de Saint-Simon, who bore him no good will for his harsh attitude to the Jansenists, says that his friends deserted him as the royal favour waned, until at last most of his time was spent at his Château de Conflans (in Charenton-le-Pont) in the company of Paule-Françoise de Gondi, duchess of Lesdiguieres, who alone was faithful to him. Saint-Simon records that they were fond of walking through the magnificent gardens there, while a servant followed at a respectful distance to rake the gravel disturbed by their feet.

Harlay urged the Revocation of the Edict of Nantes and this took place in 1685. As a result, Dieppe, of which he was temporal and spiritual lord, saw 3,000 of its Huguenot citizens flee abroad, partly it is said on account of Harlay's severity.

=== Personal life ===
Harlay de Champvallon died suddenly, without having received the sacraments, on 6 August 1695. His funeral discourse was delivered by Père Gaillard, and Mme de Sévigné made on the occasion the severe comment that there were only two trifles to make this a difficult matter — his life and his death.

== Notes ==
Catholic Church titles
Preceded by Hardouin de Péréfixe de Beaumont	Archbishop of Paris; 1671–1695	Succeeded by Louis Antoine de Noailles
