= Christophe de Beaumont =

French noble and archbishop (1703–1781)

His Grace Christophe de Beaumont COHS
- Archbishop of Paris, Duke of Saint-Cloud, Peer of France
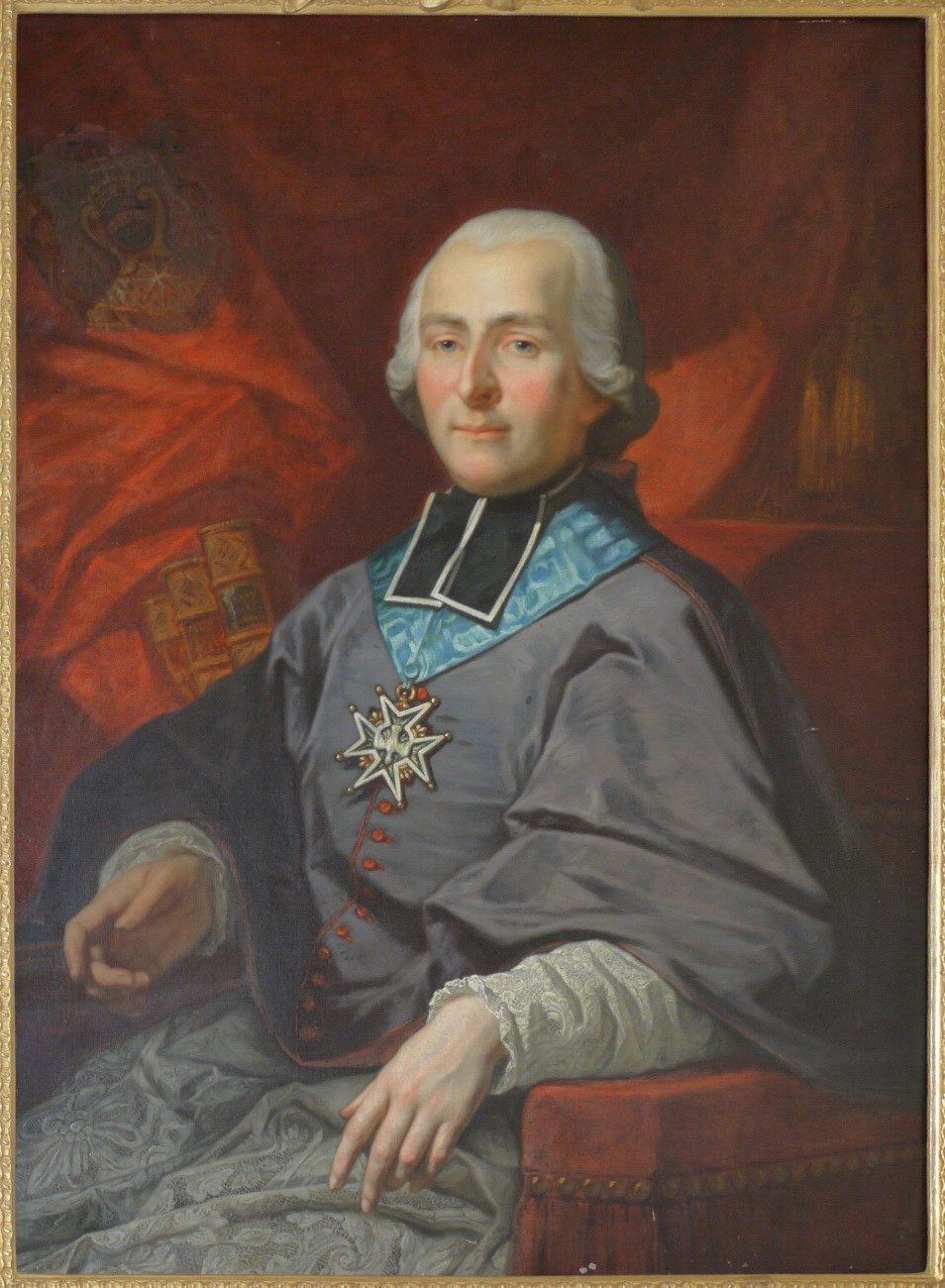
- Portrait of Christophe de Beaumont
- Church: Roman Catholic Church
- Archdiocese: Paris
- See: Notre-Dame de Paris
- Installed: 19 September 1746
- Term ended: 12 December 1781
- Predecessor: Jacques Bonne-Gigault de Bellefonds
- Successor: Antoine-Eléonore-Léon Le Clerc de Juigné
- Other posts: Archbishop of Vienne; Bishop of Bayonne

Orders
- Ordination: 19 June 1734 by François de Crussol d'Uzès
- Consecration: 24 December 1741 by Louis-Jacques Chapt de Rastignac

Personal details
- Born: 26 July 1703 Château de la Roque, Aquitaine, France
- Died: 12 December 1781 (aged 78) Paris, France
- Coat of arms

Christophe de Beaumont du Repaire (26 July 1703 – 12 December 1781) was a French cleric who belonged to a cadet branch of the Les Adrets and Saint-Quentin branches of the illustrious Dauphin family of Beaumont. He became Bishop of Bayonne in 1741, then Archbishop of Vienne in 1745, and in 1746, at the age of forty-three, Archbishop of Paris. An austere man with no wish for glory, he had to be summoned three times by Louis XV before he would leave his diocese of Vienne and move to Paris.

== History ==
=== The Struggle Against Jansenism ===
Beaumont is noted for his struggle with the Jansenists. To force them to accept the bull Unigenitus (1713) which condemned their doctrines, he ordered the priests of his diocese to withhold sacraments from those who would not recognize the bull, and to deny funeral rites to those who had confessed to a Jansenist priest. This measure had severe, damning implications for Jansenists, provoking widespread outcry against such intolerance from the Jansenists themselves, the Philosophes, the parlements, and the larger public.

While other bishops sent Beaumont their adhesion to his crusade, the Parlement of Paris threatened to confiscate his temporalities. Louis XV forbade the Parlement to interfere in these spiritual questions, and upon its proving obdurate it was exiled (18 September 1753). The royal chamber, which was substituted, having failed to carry on the administration of justice properly, the king was obliged to recall the parlement, and the archbishop was sent into honorable exile to Conflans, where he remained from August 1754 until October 1757. Efforts were made to induce him to resign the active duties of his see to a coadjutor, he refused despite the most tempting offers - including a cardinal's hat. As the dispute between the king and the Parlements continued, de Beaumont was exiled from Paris a second time, from January 1758 to October 1759. He eventually returned, having conceded none of his principles. 'Let them erect a scaffold in the midst of the court' he said, 'I would ascend it to maintain my rights, fulfil my duties and obey the laws of my conscience.'

To his polemic against the Jansenists he added an attack on the philosophes, and issued a formal mandatory letter condemning Rousseau's Émile. Rousseau replied in his masterly Lettre a M. de Beaumont (1762), in which he insists that freedom of discussion in religious matters is essentially more religious than the attempt to impose belief by force.

=== Defending the Authority of the Church ===
Archbishop de Beaumont was a forthright and powerful voice in defence of Church authority and an opponent of anything that he saw as undermining it. This often put him at odds with statesmen and thinkers alike. He was strongly opposed to the project of Diderot, D’Alembert and others to publish the Encyclopédie, and he appointed the censors who required the modification or deletion of articles which were deemed contrary to Church teaching. At de Beaumont's request, volume 2 of the Encyclopédie was banned in 1752 because it contained material deemed to be heretical. He was so strongly opposed to Madame de Pompadour that he said he should like to see her burned, and he refused her permission to receive the sacraments in her chapel.

In 1762 the Society of Jesus was suppressed in France, and de Beaumont realised that if the king and the Parlements were able to take such a drastic step the Church itself was in potential danger. In October 1763 he published a pastoral instruction condemning the encroachment of civil authority upon the spiritual. The Parlement of Paris responded by ordering the public hangman to burn the book and summoned the Archbishop to appear before it. Louis XV, anxious to avoid a major confrontation, once again banished de Beaumont from his diocese.

On 21 July 1773 the international campaign against the Jesuit Order reached the point where Pope Clement XIV issued the brief Dominus ac Redemptor which formally abolished the Order around the world. The brief explicitly indicated that the reason for the abolition was to satisfy the King of France and the other Bourbon rulers of Europe. Archbishop de Beaumont scornfully rejected the Papal brief and wrote the following to the Pope:

‘This brief which destroys the Company of Jesus is nothing other than an isolated and particular judgement, pernicious, reflecting little honour on the Papal tiara and deleterious to the glory of the Church and to the glory and propagation of the orthodox (i.e. Catholic) faith….. Holy Father, it is not possible for me to commit the Clergy to the acceptance of the said brief. I would not be heard on this point were I wretch enough to lend my ministry to it, which I should be dishonouring.’

De Beaumont's Mandements, lettres et instructions pastorales were published in two volumes in 1780, the year before his death.

== Notes ==
Catholic Church titles
Preceded by Jacques Bonne-Gigault de Bellefonds	Archbishop of Paris; 1746–1781	Succeeded by Antoine-Éléonor-Léon Leclerc de Juigné
