= Charles-Gaspard-Guillaume de Vintimille du Luc =

French Catholic Archbishop of Paris (d. 1746)

His Grace Charles-Gaspard-Guillaume de Vintimille du Luc COHS
- Archbishop of Paris, Duke of Saint-Cloud, Peer of France
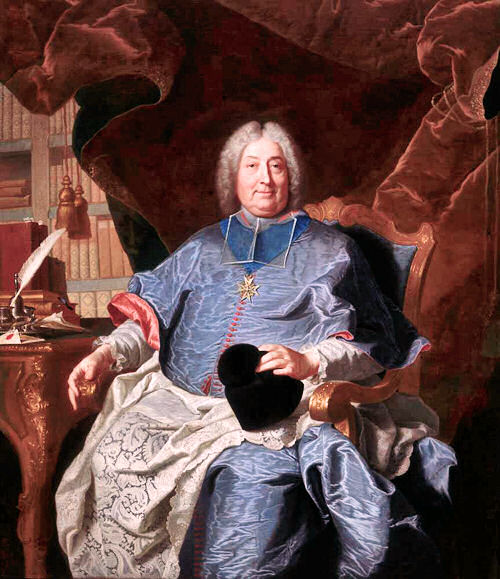
- Portrait by Hyacinthe Rigaud, 1731
- Church: Catholic Church
- Archdiocese: Paris
- See: Notre-Dame de Paris
- Installed: 17 August 1729
- Term ended: 13 March 1746
- Predecessor: Louis-Antoine de Noailles
- Successor: Jacques Bonne-Gigault de Bellefonds
- Other posts: Archbishop of Aix; Bishop of Marseille

Personal details
- Born: 15 November 1655 Luc-en-Provence, France
- Died: 13 March 1746 (aged 90) Paris, France
- Coat of arms

Charles-Gaspard-Guillaume de Vintimille du Luc (French: [ʃaʁl ɡaspaʁ ɡijom də vɛ̃timij dy lyk]; 1655–1746) was a French Catholic bishop. He was Bishop of Marseille from 1692 to 1708 and Archbishop of Aix from 1708 to 1729; from 1729 to 1746 he was the Archbishop of Paris.

== Biography ==
Charles-Gaspard-Guillaume de Vintimille du Luc was born in Le Luc on 15 November 1655, the son of François de Vintimille, Seigneur du Luc, and Anne de Forbin.

As the youngest son, Charles-Gaspard was groomed for a life in the church. In 1692, he became Bishop of Marseilles. He served there until 1708, when he became Archbishop of Aix. During this time, Aix-en-Provence, and Provence generally, were ravaged by plague.

On 10 May 1729 he was appointed Archbishop of Paris, becoming Duke of Saint-Cloud as well as a result.

He died in Paris on 13 March 1746.

Catholic Church titles
Preceded by Louis Antoine de Noailles	Archbishop of Paris; 1729–1746	Succeeded by Jacques Bonne-Gigault de Bellefonds
