= Charles Antoine de La Roche-Aymon =

French prelate and cardinal

His Eminence Charles Antoine de La Roche-Aymon COHS
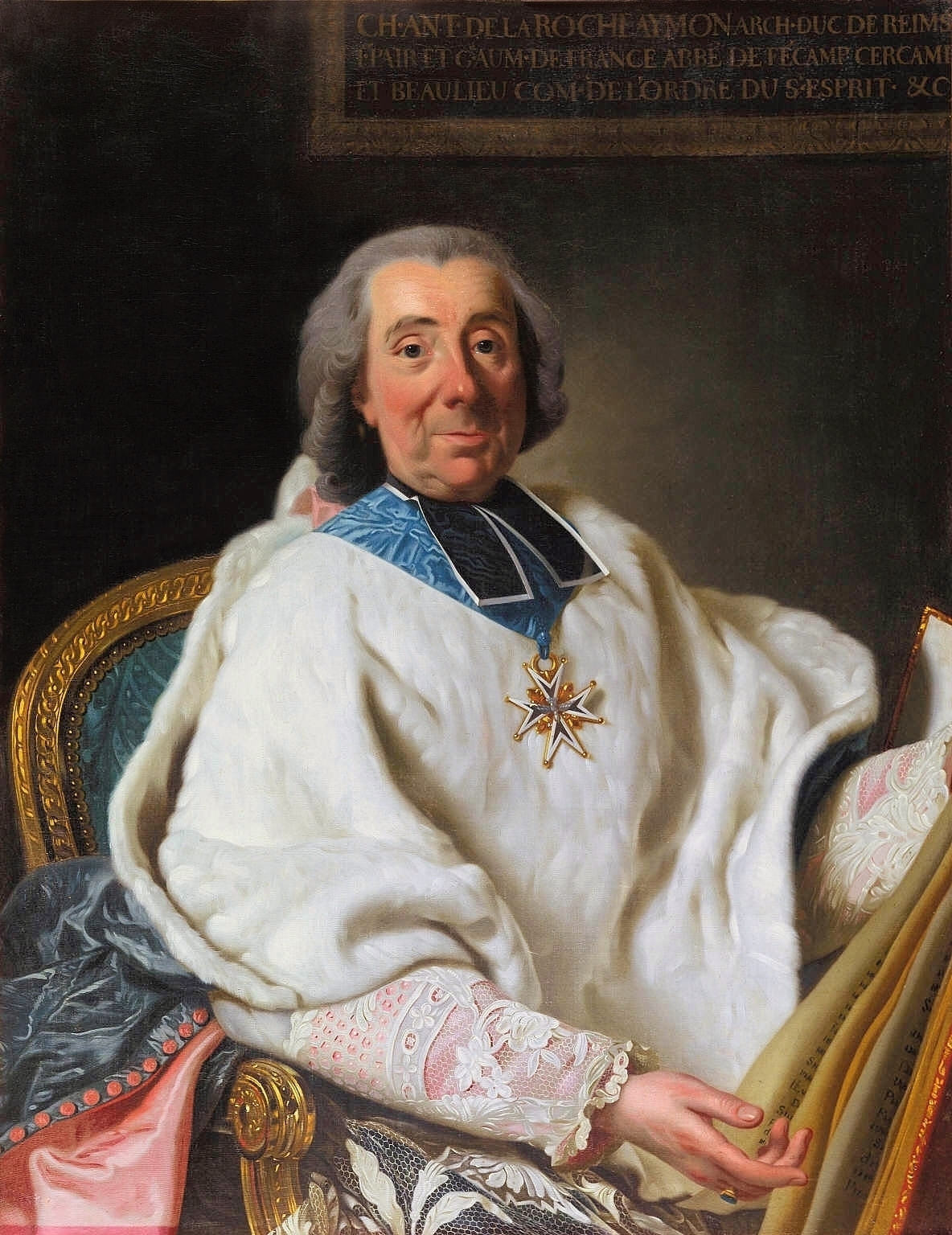
- Portrait by Alexander Roslin, 1769

Grand Almoner of France
- In office 1760 – 27 October 1777
- Preceded by: Nicolas de Saulx-Tavannes
- Succeeded by: Louis René Édouard de Rohan
- Cardinal, Archbishop-Duke of Reims, Peer of France
- Church: Roman Catholic Church
- Archdiocese: Reims
- See: Notre-Dame de Reims
- Installed: 24 January 1763
- Term ended: 27 October 1777
- Predecessor: Armand Jules de Rohan-Guéméné
- Successor: Alexandre-Angélique de Talleyrand-Périgord
- Other posts: Archbishop of Toulouse; Archbishop of Narbonne; Bishop of Tarbes

Personal details
- Born: 17 February 1697 Mainsat, La Marche, France
- Died: 27 October 1777 (aged 80) Paris, France
- Education: University of Paris

Charles Antoine, Count of La Roche-Aymon, born at Mainsat (Marche) on 17 February 1697 and died in Paris on 27 October 1777, was a French prelate, cardinal and Grand Almoner of France.

La Roche-Aymon was born in the diocese of Limoges in 1696, and had a doctorate in theology (Paris 1724). He was a Canon of Mâcon, and served as Vicar-General of Limoges. He had been titular Bishop of Sarepta and Auxiliary Bishop of Limoges (1725–1730), Bishop of Tarbes (1730–1740), Archbishop of Toulouse (1740–1752), and Archbishop of Narbonne (1752–1763). He was nominated Archbishop of Reims by King Louis XV on 5 December 1762, and was approved (preconized) on 24 January 1763 by Pope Clement XIII. He was created a cardinal on 16 December 1771 by Pope Clement XIV.

A member of the assemblies of the clergy in 1735, 1740, 1745, and 1748, he presided over them from 1760. In 1770, Louis XV appointed him minister of the profits sheet after the disgrace of M. de Jarente.

As grand aumônier, La Roche-Aymon oversaw several important events in the waning days of the ancien régime. On 16 May 1770, La Roche-Aymon had performed the marriage at Versailles of Louis, dauphin of France, to Marie Antoinette, Archduchess of Austria. He administered the last sacraments to Louis XV at the king's death on 10 May 1774, and crowned his successor Louis XVI at Reims on 11 June 1775.

Charles Antoine de La Roche-Aymon was also elected as the maintainer of the Floral Games Academy in 1742.

He died on 27 October 1777.
