= Livre d'orgue =

Livre d'orgue ('organ book') is a French term which usually designates a collection of pieces for organ. It may refer to many such publications, including:

- Livre d'orgue (Messiaen), by 20th century French composer Olivier Messiaen
- Livre d'orgue de Montréal, a manuscript collection, brought to North America from France, dating from the early 18th century
- Livre d'orgue de Limoges, a manuscript collection dating from the early 18th century
- Livre d'orgue by André Raison (1688)
- Livre d'orgue by Pierre du Mage (1708), only extant work.
- Livre d'orgue by Louis-Nicolas Clérambault (1710)
- Three livres d'orgue by Nicolas Lebègue (1676, 1678 & 1685)
- Livre d'orgue by Nicolas de Grigny (1699, with a posthumous edition in 1711).

== See also ==
- French organ Mass
- French organ school
