= Norbert Dufourcq =

French organist and musicologist (1904–1990)

- Born: Norbert Stéphane Jean Marie Dufourcq; 21 September 1904; Saint-Jean-de-Braye, France
- Died: 19 December 1990 (aged 86); Paris, France
- Education: École Nationale des Chartes; Collège Stanislas de Paris
- Occupations: Organist; Musicologist; Music historian
- Organizations: Conservatoire de Paris; École Normale de Musique de Paris
- Relatives: Nicolas Dufourcq (grandson)
- Awards: Prix Broquette-Gonin

Norbert Stéphane Jean Marie Dufourcq (French pronunciation: [nɔʁbɛʁ dyfuʁk]; 21 September 1904 – 19 December 1990) was a French organist, music educator, musicologist and musicographer.

== Biography ==
Norbert Dufourcq was born in 1904 in Saint-Jean-de-Braye in the Loiret department of France. His parents were the historian Albert Dufourcq who worked as a professor at the University of Bordeaux and Madeleine Dufourcq, née Prot. His maternal grandfather, Paul Prot, owned Parfums Lubin. He was the third of six children. He was named after his paternal grandfather, Bernard-Norbert Dufourcq.

Trained at the École des chartes and holder of a doctorate of literature, and an archivist/palaeographer, Norbert Dufourcq nonetheless devoted himself to music.

An amateur organist (pupil of André Marchal), he served as titular organist of the organ of the Saint-Merri church in Paris from 1923 to his death. The Clicquot/Cavaillé-Coll pipe organ was restored by the Gonzalez company in a neo-classical aesthetic under the direction of its owner between 1946 and 1947. Many stops were added to the instrument.

A professor of music history at the Conservatoire de Paris from 1941 to 1975 and musicology at the École normale de musique de Paris between 1958 and 1963, he was also the author of numerous articles and books on music in general, the organ and harpsichord in particular; Moreover, he founded the journal Recherches sur la musique française classique, continued by Marcelle Benoît.

== Pedagogy ==
In 1946, he participated in a collective work entitled La Musique des origines à nos jours. The collaborative work had him partner with musicologists such as Solange Corbin.

An organ enthusiast from a young age, he was co-founder with Bérenger de Miramon Fitz-James of the Association des amis de l’orgue from 1926 to 1927 and served as its Secretary-General. He also established the magazine L’Orgue, where he often wrote expressing his ideas on the historicity of French classical organs.

Additionally, Dufourcq was also responsible for the restitution and publication in modern edition of classical French organ music such as livres d'orgue by Guillaume-Gabriel Nivers, Gilles Jullien, Nicolas Lebègue, Louis-Antoine Dornel, Alexandre Boëly, Michel Corrette, as well as a manuscript by Mathieu Lanes; as well as a controversial rebuild of the organ of Auch Cathedral in which a large amount of historical 17th-century pipework was destroyed, and an electrification of the instrument's tracker action.

Dufourcq was president of the French association of musicologists Société française de musicologie from 1955 to 1958.

His archives of the Commission des orgues are kept in the archives of the city of Paris, Papiers Norbert Dufourcq, 1933–1984, Cotes: D70Z 1 à 10, référence de l’instrument de recherche: VII.2.3.

== Personal life ==
On the day before his 22nd birthday in 1926, he married the historian Odette Latron (1904–1994).

Dufourcq had five children, one of whom was the diplomat Bertrand Dufourcq, who was the father of the businessman Nicolas Dufourcq.

He died on 19 December 1990. A simple funeral service, in accordance with his will, was held in the Parisian church of Saint-Sulpice in his memory. He was buried at the Montmartre Cemetery afterwards.

== Bibliography ==
- 1933: La musique française, Éditions Larousse, Paris.
- 1935: Esquisse d'une histoire de l'orgue en France du XIIIe au XVIIIe siècles, étude technique et archéologique de l'instrument, thèse pour le doctorat ès-lettres.
- 1938: La musique d'orgue française au XXe., Paris.
- 1942: Les Clicquot : facteurs d'orgues du Roy, contribution à l'histoire d'une famille d'artisans d'origine champenoise sous l'Ancien Régime, Floury, Paris.
- 1946: La musique des origines à nos jours, under the dir. of Norbert Dufourcq, Larousse.
- 1948: Jean-Sébastien Bach, le maître de l'orgue, Floury, Paris.
- 1948: L'Orgue, PUF, Paris, (Que sais-je ?).
- 1949: Le clavecin, PUF, (Que sais-je ?).
- 1969: Marcelle Benoît, Norbert Dufourcq and Bernard Gagnepain, Les grandes dates de l'histoire de la musique 3rd ed., 1995.

== See also ==
- French organ school

== Sources ==
- "Norbert Dufourcq (1904-1990)". L'Orgue. Cahiers et mémoires issues 49-50 (1993): 292 pages.
