= Jacques Boyvin =

French composer and organist

Jacques Boyvin (c. 1649 – 30 June 1706) was a French Baroque composer and organist.

He was probably born in Paris, and studied there. One of his first jobs was that of organist of the Parisian church des Quinze-Vingts, and in 1674 he was appointed titular organist of the Rouen Cathedral, where Jean Titelouze served as organist some 40 years earlier. Other jobs included playing the organ of Rouen's Saint Herbland Church and supervising the rebuilding of the giant four-manual Clicquot cathedral organ. Boyvin was also an organ teacher: François d'Agincourt was one of his pupils and succeeded him as organist of the Rouen Cathedral. Like Titelouze, Boyvin remained the organist of the cathedral until his death on 30 June 1706.

Boyvin published two collections of organ works, in 1689 and in 1700, both featuring pieces spanning all church modes. The books contain 16 suites, no less than 120 individual pieces total. The second book contains the Traité abrégé de l'accompagnement, a treatise on accompaniment. The pieces are liturgical in nature and exhibit a brilliant style which makes use of forms and discoveries by Nicolas Lebègue and Guillaume-Gabriel Nivers.

== See also ==
- French organ school
