= André Raison =

French Baroque composer and organist

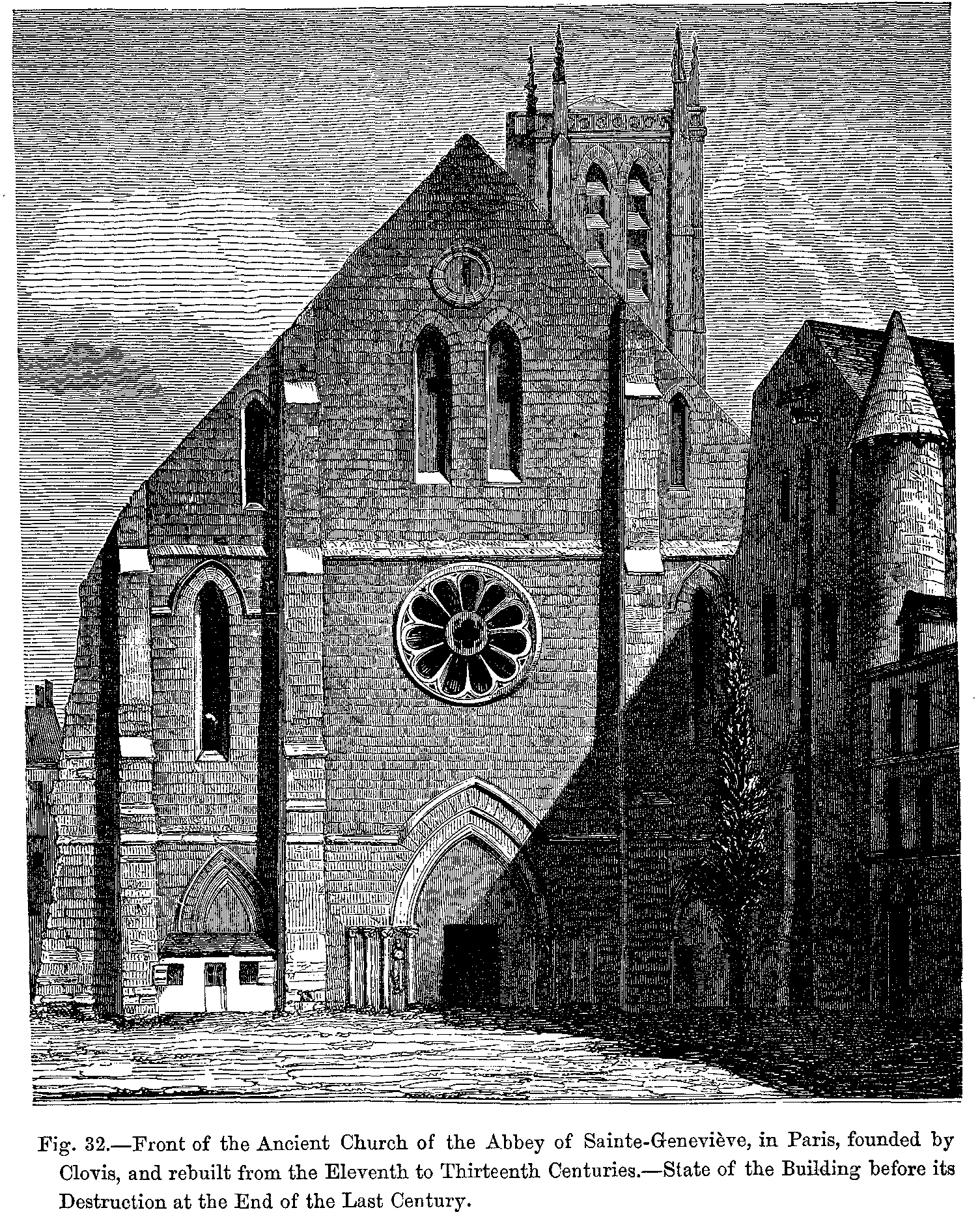
A drawing of the front of the church of the Abbey of Sainte-Geneviève, in Paris, where Raison worked. The building was demolished after 1800.

André Raison (c. 1640 – 1719) was a French Baroque composer and organist. During his lifetime he was one of the most famous French organists and an important influence on French organ music. He published two collections of organ works, in 1688 and 1714. The first contains liturgical music intended for monasteries and a preface with information on contemporary performance practice. The second contains mostly noëls (variations on Christmas carols).

== Life ==
The exact date and place of Raison's birth are unknown. He was born in the 1640s, possibly in or near the town of Nanterre (today a suburb of Paris). He was educated there at the seminary of the Church of St. Geneviève (today a commune of Paris). Raison's later life was evidently greatly influenced by the experiences at St. Geneviève. Writing in 1687 or 1688 (in the preface to his Premier livre d’orgue, published in 1688) the composer mentioned that he found the purpose of his life while studying at the seminary. Around 1665–66 Raison was appointed organist of the Abbey of St Genevieve in Paris, another place connected to St Genevieve and one that owned the land on which the Nanterre church stood.

In Paris Raison first lived in a room in "The Guardian Angel", a house in Rue Saint Etienne des Grez, two city blocks away from the abbey. Apparently this was a very modest accommodation, yet Raison remained there for more than twenty years. After 1687–88 he moved to a much larger house at the intersection of the Rue Saint Etienne des Grez and Cholets. His life was improving steadily, and a tax register of 1695 places him in the top rank of Parisian organists, along with François Couperin, Jean-Henri d'Anglebert, Nicolas Gigault, Nicolas de Grigny, and Louis Marchand. Finally, Raison's Second livre d'orgue, published in 1714, indicates that at that time he worked as organist at the church of the Jacobins at Rue St. Jacques in Paris. He died a few years later in 1719, and was succeeded at the Jacobins church by his most illustrious pupil, Louis-Nicolas Clérambault. Clérambault's Premier livre d'orgue (1710) was dedicated to Raison.

Although Raison was somewhat interested in politics (at least twice he produced pieces inspired by political events: an offertory from Premier livre d'orgue is dedicated to Louis XIV's entrance into the city hall on 30 January 1687, and several pieces in Second livre d'orgue commemorate the "long desired peace" that followed the Treaty of Utrecht). As far as the circumstances of his life are known, he seems to have been an exceptionally private and pious person. No record of Raison travelling or acting as organ consultant survives. His Premier livre d'orgue contains extensive instructions for inexperienced church musicians. He apparently never played at court and was not known by the associations there. His contacts with other organists were probably limited, and he was not mentioned in Évrard Titon du Tillet's famous Le Parnasse François, a 1732 book of biographies of famous French musicians. The Lettres sur les hommes célèbres du siècle de Louis XV, a similar book by the son of organist and composer Louis-Claude Daquin, also does not contain any mention of Raison, even though Raison's pupil Clérambault is given due praise.

== Works ==
The first collection, Premier livre d'orgue of 1688, consists entirely of liturgical music: five masses (in order of appearance, in the first, second, third, sixth and eighth modes) and an offertory in the fifth mode. The offertory has a subtitle "Vive le Roy des Parisiens" ("Long live the King of Parisians"), referencing Louis XIV's entrance into the city hall on 30 January 1687. The collection features a long preface in which Raison explains that Premier livre d'orgue was composed to assist the musicians of secluded monasteries; for them he provides important instructions concerning style, ornamentation, registration and other aspects of performance practice. He also mentions that, since no pieces of the collection employ plainchant melodies, they can also be used as 15 Magnificat settings. A much quoted passage instructs the performer to carefully observe the tempo of each piece to understand which dance is implied by the texture.

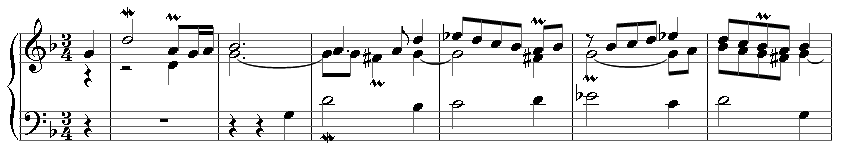
First bars of Christe: Trio en passacaille from Messe du Deuxième ton, showing the simple, yet unusual, imitative beginning of the work. The ostinato pattern (seen here in full form) is identical to the first half of the ostinato of Johann Sebastian Bach's Passacaglia in C minor, BWV 582/1. Here, it will be repeated six times, each time either slightly altered using ornaments, or in a heavily modified form.

All five masses follow the same standard scheme: 5 versets for Kyrie, 9 for Gloria, 3 for Sanctus, one Elevation, 2 Agnus Dei versets and a Deo Gratias. There are only minor variations: the first mass has an alternate version of Kyrie 1, the third provides one for Agnus 2, and the titles of Gloria settings are slightly changed in the 6th tone mass. The individual pieces are short versets in various typical forms of the French organ school: duos, trios, dialogues, fugues, récits, etc.; some are expressly labelled as such, others are not. Somewhat unusual for French music of the era are two ostinato variations – a passacaglia (Christe of the Messe du Deuxième ton) and a chaconne (Christe of the Messe du Sixième ton). Both are much shorter than their German and Italian equivalents. Some 20 years later Johann Sebastian Bach used the bass from Raison's passacaglia for his famous Passacaglia and Fugue in C minor, BWV 582 (the bass from Trio en chaconne was also possibly used by Bach for the same piece).

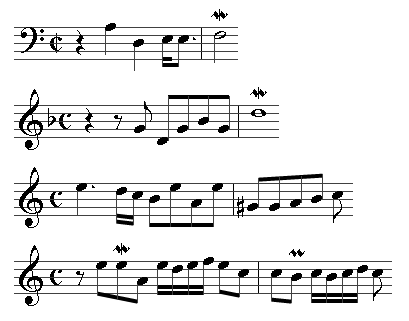
A sample of fugal themes from Raison's Premier livre d'orgue (click the image for details)

Many of the pieces are notable for their consistent employment of imitative counterpoint: for example, the Fugue grave of the third mass is fully imitative, a strict four-voice fugue, and even the passacaglia begins with an imitative passage. Other notable pieces include Gloria: Tu solus altissimus from the Messe du Sixième ton, which is a Cromorne-Cornet dialogue alternating between 3/4 and common time, and Autre Kyrie from Messe du Première ton, which is a five-voice piece. Willi Apel describes the overall style thus: "In their melodious, dance-like character these pieces follow Lebègue; others of a more organ-like and ecclesiastic approach are similar to Nivers'." An interesting feature, indicative of Raison's meticulous attention to detail, is the early use of double dotting in French music of the period.

The Deuxième livre d'orgue, published in 1714, commemorates the Treaty of Utrecht (or possibly the Treaty of Rastatt). To this end, the collection begins with a setting of Da pacem Domine and a fugue on the same subject. Some more fugues and preludes follow, an offertory, an Ouverture du Septième en d, la, ré, an Allemande grave and a number of noël (French Christmas carols) variations. This collection was only discovered in the 20th century (whereas Premier livre d'orgue surfaced in 1897).

== Bibliography ==
- Apel, Willi. 1972. The History of Keyboard Music to 1700, pp. 731–733. Translated by Hans Tischler. Indiana University Press. ISBN 0-253-21141-7. Originally published as Geschichte der Orgel- und Klaviermusik bis 1700 by Bärenreiter-Verlag, Kassel.
- Butler, Joseph H. (2001). "André Raison". In Sadie, Stanley; Tyrrell, John (eds.). The New Grove Dictionary of Music and Musicians (2nd ed.). London: Macmillan Publishers. ISBN 978-1-56159-239-5.
- Gay, Harry W. 1975. Four French Organist-Composers, 1549-1720 (Memphis, 1975)
- Guilmant, Pirro (ed.). Archives des Maîtres de l'Orgue, Vol. 2: Raison, André - Livre d'Orgue. Ed. Alexandre Guilmant, André Pirro. A. Durand et fils, 1899.
