= Notes inégales =

Musical performance practice

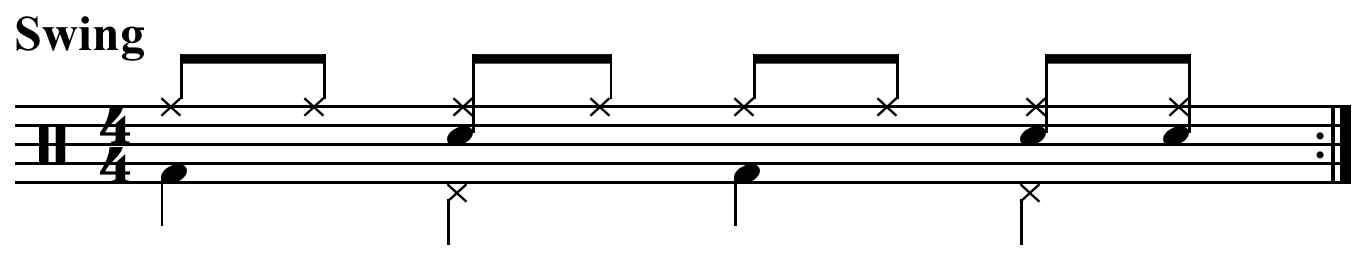
Notation in straight eighths (in drum set notation)

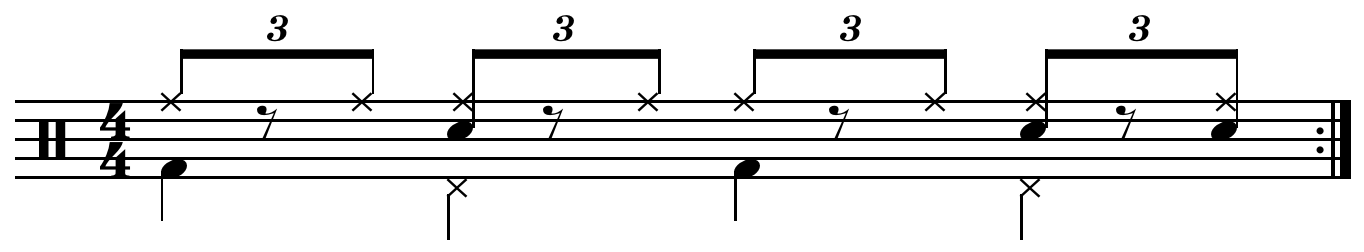
Triplet-like performance of that notation as notes inégales (jazz shuffle).

Notes inégales – ratio 2:1 (triplet feel)

In music, notes inégales is a performance practice, mainly from the Baroque and Classical music eras, in which some notes with equal written time values are performed with unequal durations, usually as alternating long and short. The practice was especially prevalent in France in the 17th and 18th centuries, with appearances in other European countries at the same time. It reappeared as the standard performance practice in the 20th century in jazz. The phrase "notes inégales" means "unequal notes" in French.

== History ==
=== Pre-modern era ===
The practice of notating pairs of unequal note lengths as pairs with equal notated value may go as far back as the earliest music of the Middle Ages; indeed some scholars believe that some plainchant of the Roman Catholic Church, including Ambrosian hymns, may have been performed as alternating long and short notes. This interpretation is based on a passage in Saint Augustine where he refers to the Ambrosian hymns as being in tria temporum (in three beats); e.g. a passage rendered on the page (by a later transcriber) as a string of notes of equal note value would be performed as half note, quarter note, half note, quarter note, and so on, in groups of three beats.

The rhythmic modes, with their application of various long–short patterns to equal written notes, may also have been a precursor to notes inégales, especially as they were practiced in France, specifically by the Notre Dame School. However the gap between the late 13th century ars antiqua use of the rhythmic modes and the middle of the 16th century, when Loys Bourgeois first mentioned notes inégales, is a large one, and little trace of the practice can be found in the fluid polyphony of the intervening period.

=== French origins ===
It was in France, beginning in the late 16th century, that notes inégales began to take on a critical role in performance practice. The earliest treatises that mention inequality of notes in performance indicate that the reason for this practice is to add beauty or interest to a passage which otherwise would be plain. Over 85 music theory and performance treatises from France alone mention the topic between 1550 and 1810, with the large majority written between 1690 and 1780. Within this body of writing there is considerable inconsistency, but by the late 17th century a consensus practice began to emerge.

The typical rule, from the late 17th century until the French Revolution, is that notes inégales applies to all notes moving stepwise which have a duration of one quarter the denominator of the meter, for instance, eighth notes in a meter of 2/2, or sixteenth notes in a meter of 4/4; and one half the denominator of the meter in cases of triple or compound meter, for instance, eighth notes in 3/4, sixteenth notes in 3/8, 6/8 and 9/8. In addition, the inégales could only function on one metrical level; for example, if sixteenths are to be played long–short, long–short, an even eighth-note pulse must be carefully maintained for the music to retain its shape.

In Georg Muffat's codification of notes inégales in the Lullist tradition, he says it is the first level of diminution that is subject to inequality procedure.

Sometimes the notes inégales are notated as unequal, for example in some of the keyboard works of François Couperin, where he uses a dot to indicate the lengthened note. This and similar passages by Rameau (in his first Gavotte) clearly show that this means to apply an even greater amount of inequality to dotted eighth–sixteenth note pairs than to eighth–eighth pairs, which are already understood to be played unequally. The exact amount of inequality required is also unspecified, and most of the treatises leave this detail to the taste of the performer. It may have varied from double-dotted to minimally perceptible, depending on the context. Some recent papers and books include a full analysis of this topic as well as practical guides for the performer. Also, musical clocks have been discovered from the period that show the dotting very clearly as such devices have "preserved performances of notes inégales that are often as subtle as a 3:2 ratio (i.e. three fifths of a beat for the first note, two fifths for the second in the pair), as well as the more obvious 2:1 ratio (triplets), and 3:1 (dotted eighth–sixteenth pairs and their multiples).

4/4 without notes inégales	4/4 with notes inégales – ratio 7:5	4/4 with notes inégales – ratio 3:2	4/4 with notes inégales – ratio 2:1	4/4 with notes inégales – ratio 3:1
3/4 without notes inégales	3/4 with notes inégales – ratio 7:5	3/4 with notes inégales – ratio 3:2	3/4 with notes inégales – ratio 2:1	3/4 with notes inégales – ratio 3:1

There were situations which were understood to be exempt from application of notes inégales. A broken arpeggiated figuration in the left hand, such as an Alberti bass, was always understood to be played regularly. Sometimes one sees the explicit marking: croches égales meaning equal quavers or eighth notes. Passages which mixed note values may have been exempted from the practice. Occasionally a long slur printed over a series of notes was understood to imply that all the notes should be played evenly, except that the first note under the slur could be accented. Passages which were highly disjunct were also less likely to be played unequally than conjunct passages, although the sources are not unanimous on even this.

If the effect of a passage was dotted, the compelling rhythm of the dotted notes, or notes inégales, would sometimes simply override all the rules. The Handel Fugue in D Minor from the First Sett of Suites 1709 in its first editions shows the first few notes of the theme with dotted rhythms, but the dots stop after 4 note for the first two entries; the next two entries Handel only bothers to dot the first two notes. The energy of the piece seems such that the dotted texture might best remain throughout, however the long–short notes inégales can occasionally be supplanted with some "short–long" moments, still retaining the dotted effect, or as John O'Donnell describes it, "The Majestic Style", but some variance can work quite effectively, and still adhere to many of the rules.

In particular, in much of French music, and a lot in Handel as well, there are problems the performer faces, and the most prevalent one is this: sometimes at the approach of cadences in an notes inégales texture, the composer suddenly writes some dotted notes out explicitly and sometimes then stops; the inconsistency of dotting has continued to be a problem for every musicologist, theoretical and performer. Anthony Newman has suggested in an article, that there was an undocumented convention that the dotted texture recedes generally at the approach to a cadence, all other musical factors and concerns being equal, and that is why the dots stop and start sometimes quite oddly towards the approach to cadence.

=== Slurred long–short pairs ===
Often, the long–short version of notes inégales was indicated by slurred pairs of notes throughout the French repertoire in François Couperin, Jacques Duphly, Antoine Forqueray, Pierre Dumage, Louis-Nicolas Clérambault, Jean-François Dandrieu, and Jean-Philippe Rameau, to cite the more prominent keyboard composers from the French Baroque.

=== Lullist short–long pairs ===
Occasionally the long–short version of notes inégales was reversed to a short–long, known sometimes as the Lombard rhythm or the Scotch snap.

The practice of slurred pairs of notes being possibly an indication of short–long "notes inégales" has been suggested to extend further than France to "French (Lullist) modelled" compositions throughout Europe, especially Germany, Austria, and England, and even to influence the performance of slurred pairs of notes in the fast movements of Beethoven (and other non-French and non-Baroque composers), such as in the Sonata in F♯ major, Op.78, among other sonatas, where the tempo and the slurred pairs can only result in a Lombardic or snapped short–long "notes inégales" performance.

In Restoration England, in the French modelled, Lullist influenced works of Henry Purcell, William Croft, Jeremiah Clarke and their contemporaries, the short–long slurred pairs of notes inégales can be found throughout the musical literature, and often variant sources "write out" the short–long "snapped" notes inégales rhythms explicitly.

=== Imitation of the French style outside France ===
One of the best sources for understanding the situation of notes inégales in France is the notation of music by composers from other European countries who wrote imitations of it. Music from Italy, Germany and England all borrowed this feature of French music, with the difference that the inequality of note values was often notated, since not all performers could be expected to add the notes inégales themselves (though evidence from Georg Muffat and Telemann strongly suggests that German performers would certainly be familiar with them).

=== Prevalence outside France ===
Application of notes inégales to contemporary performance of music not written in France, for example the music of J.S. Bach, is extremely controversial, and indeed resulted in one of the most heated debates in 20th-century musicology. One school of thought attempted to show that the French practice was actually widespread in Europe, and performance of music by composers as diverse as Bach and Scarlatti should be suffused with dotted rhythms; another school of thought held that even-note playing was the norm in their music unless dotted rhythms were explicitly notated in the score. Evidence on both sides of the argument is compelling; for example 17th-century English writings recommending unequal playing (Roger North's autobiographical Notes of Me, written around 1695, describes the practice explicitly, in reference to English lute music), as well as François Couperin, who wrote in L'art de toucher le clavecin (1716), that in Italian music, Italians always write the notes exactly the way they want them played. Then again, the practice may have been more widespread in some areas, such as England, than others, such as Italy and Germany.

J.S. Bach famously imitated the style in Contrapunctus II from the Art of Fugue; however, in this piece the notes inégales are written out as dotted rhythms.

But in Contrapunctus VI, fully embracing notes inégales, a composition written in the complex texture of the "Ouverture", in Stile francese, Bach uses "the dotted style" in augmentation, and writes out the notes inégales although many treatises describe the assimilation of upbeat notes to have the slower rhythms become "in sync" with the shorter notes of the fast upbeat note groups, as well as the "short" notes of the inégales pairs.

And perhaps most significantly, in Contrapunctus 16 – actually two Fugues one normal and its pair in mirror inversion, the notes inégales are written out in a texture of running triplets, showing the varying value of the dot, as well as the varying "swing" of notes inégales. And it is of interest to note that in the keyboard arrangements of this work, the notes inégales are not written out, and this suggests strongly that the practice of notes inégales, of rhythmic alteration, was known to Bach and his circle. In his teens, Bach travelled and studied at the French-modelled Court of Georg Wilhelm in Celle (near Lüneburg) in northern Germany, where there was an orchestra modelled on the Concert Royal of Lully. During this time it is believed he studied and wrote compositions in the French Style, such as a five-part incomplete Fantasie and Fugue for organ, BWV 562, that is based exactly on the voicing, texture, and structure of the works of the French baroque composer De Grigny, and would make it eligible for notes inégales. His later work, the Fantasia and Fugue in C minor, BWV 537, also uses the same mostly 8th note texture, is written in the same time signature, features a similar texture, and responds well to the application of long–short notes inégales to the evenly notated 8th notes, and short–long to the slurred 8th note pairs, also typical and consistent to classic baroque French notes inégales procedures.

=== Handel ===
Handel also seemed to use and understand notes inégales in many of his works. However, like often in the French literature, there are also inconsistencies which have never been fully explained where dots start and then stop for no clear reason, but as Newman has observed, mostly this happens towards the approach to cadences. But in general, in many of his suites, and even his orchestral music, the application of notes inégales finds a solid home in Handel. Most obvious are in some of the Ouvertures, but there are many movements where a subtle notes inégales works well, such as in the Sarabande of the E Minor suite (from the set of Eight Great Suites; his earliest compilation); and numerous Menuets throughout his keyboard and even some of his orchestral works. Even in his orchestral music, and vocal music, Handel can have some very "French" moments – some of the menuets in particular, keyboard as well as orchestral, can work well with a subtle notes inégales, despite Handel's very intercontinental lineage. Whether in Germany or England, he was clearly a master at the French notes inégales as well as the Ouverture style. He was strongly influenced by Georg Muffat's nephew, who will be discussed below, and perhaps that is a part of Handel's reception of the French Style of playing. And occasionally one finds movements that don't seem necessarily "French", as over the years, Handel did develop a very strong "English" style that was unique to him, but nonetheless, sound very much more "revealed" when subjected to notes inégales aka inequality procedure.

=== Georg Muffat ===
The entire corpus of stylistic practices related to the Lullist model, of which notes inégales was one of the most significant features of rhythmic alteration, was perhaps widely spread throughout late 17th and early 18th-century Germany and Austria by the Austrian composer Georg Muffat. He went to the Lullist court to study and codify the Lullist performance practices and did it in an exhaustive foreword to his Florilegium Secundum, a collection containing orchestral suites based on the models and performance practices of Lully, synthesized with Muffat's studies with Corelli in Italy, which he previously presented to the musical public in his Armonico Tributo and Florilegium Primum.

Writers have long credited Muffat's impact with his publication of an explicitly detailed foreword in German, French, Italian and Latin in 1698, where he codifies more explicitly than any other writer (and primary performance practice source) the Lullist Manner of Playing. Through the impact of his Florilegium Secundum, following his earlier also significant works, Muffat has been credited by many, including the great 18th century writer and music critic Charles Burney to introducing the "French Ouverture" throughout the rest of Europe, but Muffat can be perhaps even more credited as "creating" the German style – as a remarkable and unique synthesis of the Italian and French styles into a "new, hybrid, amalgamated style"; creating a uniquely identifiable texture what has come down to us as the beginnings of a true, unique, German musical style.

=== Bach ===
Certainly this new complex transformation and amalgamation of the Italian style with the new "Fashionable" Lullist/French style is evident in the complex French Ouverture textures found throughout Bach's works, and explicitly formed the models of Bach's own Orchestral Suites, and the Ouverture nach Französischer Art, BWV 831, which Bach published along with the Italienisches Konzert, BWV 971, which show a profound intensification of texture compared to the Austrian and German Music that preceded J.S. Bach.

In Bach's textures, the French composer's 8th notes which were eligible notes inégales became Bach's 16th notes. But at the same time, other rhythms were "sharpened" and certain types of three note sixteenth note figures were often "compressed to three 32nd note upbeat figures. And upbeat 8th notes became upbeat 16th notes. (All the would be evenly written eight notes are written out in long–short notes inégales). Bach's texture was very much more complex than that of the Lully and Muffat. As a result, there was ambiguity for what notes would be eligible for notes inégales performance.

In an earlier version of Ouverture nach Französischer Art, there is a manuscript in a student of Bach's hand, Johann Preller, the three note 32nd notes are not yet notated as such. Instead the texture is full of 16th notes which have Preller's ornaments in all the places that would suggest notes inégales of the long–short variety – most of Preller's trills and mordents are on the first and third note of every group of four 16th notes – the notes that if subjected to standard long–short notes inégales would become longer by a dot – and have more time for an ornament; indeed the ornaments that happen on would be the third 16th note would consequently make the unanchored groups of three impossible to sharpen rhythmically into upbeat 32nd notes, aka, in stile francese; or as Burney describes; the groups of short and fast upbeat figures that define the texture of the [French] Ouverture.

However, preparing the work for publication, Bach realized his complex texture was misunderstood, and that in fact most of the 16th notes were to be played not notes inégales, but in "Ouverture style", where the groups of three "unanchored" (meaning the first of each group of four 16th notes was either tied, or a rest) the following three 16th notes could be said to be "unanchored". Such 16th notes are "compressed to become 32nd note upbeat figures throughout most of the "Ouverture" section of the movement. However, in the 13th measure there is a passage with anchored 16th notes which in fact are eligible for long–short notes inégales, and Bach "leaves them be". A performer may apply notes inégales to the 16th notes in that passage effectively. Again, consistent with the Lullist model, throughout the rest of the overture, there are no evenly written 8th notes; they have all been "written out" in notes inégales like Contrapunctus 2 of Die Kunst der Fuge as dotted 8ths and 16th notes. In performance, it is likely that the notes inégales will end up even sharper, with the long note of the long–short pairs becoming longer, so the short upbeat note can fit in with the last of the groups of the upbeat 32nd notes; all of which is consistent with the flexibility of notes inégales, as well as the concept of "upbeat assimilation", another legacy of in stile francese. In one way, to the 17th- and 18th-century composer/performer, notes inégales was an interdependent consequence of "ouverture style", or in stile francese.

Other movements by Bach in Ouverture Texture, where the 16th notes can be played in long–short notes inégales are the Fugue in D Major, WTCI; the Gigue in the French Suite in D Minor; the fugue in D Minor from WTC II – where the 16th notes can be played in long–short notes inégales against the general triplet texture (not unlike the fugue from the Kunst der Fuge in the keyboard arrangements, and the 16th notes in Ouverture from the D Major Partita, in the slow Ouverture section.

Outside of the keyboard literature, in the cello and lute suites, the suite in C Minor has two versions, and the suite opens with a Prelude that is in stile francese. The early version is like the early version of the Ouverture; mostly 16th notes that could? be eligible for notes inégales. However, Bach rewrites the later version again shows a clarification of the evenly written 16th notes that are unanchored, being subject to "overture style" rhythmic alteration where the unanchored three 16th note groups are assimilated into groups of three 32nd notes upbeats, against a texture that is mostly full of long–short notes inégales dotted eight note/sixteenth note pairs.

=== J.K.F. Fischer ===
Johann Caspar Ferdinand Fischer, a highly influential composer, who lived a generation before Bach, also "adopted" this new transformation of an Austrian/German national musical style. A study of Fischer is outside the scope of the topic of notes inégales, but his large Chaconne in G Major – a copy of which was made by Purcell's teacher, John Blow, surely not a coincidence – is written solely in even eighth notes in the first of its two G Major sections (as well as the Chaconne's dénouement conclusion). Fischer's Chaconne greatly resembles the Chaconnes of Louis Couperin and Nicolas Le Bègue in key, time signature, texture and affect, both of whom are contemporary to Lully, and fully qualify for notes inégales treatment of the evenly notated eighth notes.

==== Fischer's influence on J.S. Bach ====
With the application of notes inégales to the evenly notated eighth notes in the Fischer, the work even more comes alive as the French dance that is the Chaconne. Fischer's collection of suites published as Musicalischer Parnassus are also strongly evident of Muffat's amalgamated stylistic influence, and Fischer's compositions also foreshadow the complexity of Bach. Bach knew the works of Fischer and numerous fugue themes from the Well Tempered Clavier are taken from Fischer's own earlier collection preludes and fugues, some note for note. Fischer's most famous suite in D minor – Uranie from his collection of very French influenced suites found in the collection Musicalischer Parnassus – feature and Allemande and Courante that "need" notes inégales; and with the application of notes inégales Fischer's strong artistic compositional hand become even more evident.

=== Georg Muffat ===
In the first work of the Florilegium Secundum, Fasciculus I. – Nobilis Juventus. 1. Ouverture, Georg Muffat writes an Ouverture in stile Francese, in which he writes out the notes inégales in the topmost part, the Violino, in an approximate performance "realization" where the long–short pairs are explicitly notated in dotted eighth/sixteenth note pairs as the stylistically correct performance practice of long–short notes inégales. In the Violetta part immediately below, Muffat writes out the part in conventional, unrealized, notation. This can be seen when stepwise eighth notes are introduced in measure 12. In the Violino, they are realized in explicitly long–short pairs; in the Violetta, they are still "encoded" as they would traditionally appear in the guise of evenly notated 8th notes; the composer clearly expecting the performer to perform them in long–short notes inégales.

The practice of writing out an explicatio, often in the first instance, can be found in Francois Couperin's Premiere Ordre where he writes out samples of the kinds of embellishments he expects the performer to add upon repeat. He also writes out the long–short notes inégales fully rhythmically "realized" as well. Couperin does this in the Courante and the Gavotte, expecting the performer to take the various embellishments, rhythmic alterations and ornaments, and apply them "le bon gout" (in good taste) throughout his oeuvre. This practice of giving an explicatio was also followed by J.S. Bach in the Sarabande of his French Suite in D Minor, BWV 812, and similarly, in the Sarabande of his English Suite in G Minor, BWV 808. It is clear there was a precedent by composers to give models for the correct study and realization of performance practice issues in the works themselves, often in the context of an oral tradition where there was no need to write a treatise.

Muffat, publishing his Florilegium with multilingual prefaces, clearly intending his work to be widely published (which it was), and as there would be no opportunity for an oral tradition to transmit the performance practices, he decided in order for the music to be played correctly, he would codify the Lullist practices – with musical examples of how to perform the ornaments, interpret the various rhythmic alterations including notes inégales, as well as tempo instructions, and bowing instructions, and when and where to apply notes inégales and all the variety of Lullist embellishment and ornamentation, especially when there is no obvious indication. His extremely detailed codification of notes inégales and the Lullist performance practices, and in practical combination with his suites, and including further explication by explicit half encoded/half written out solutions to demonstrate the correct and appropriate application of notes inégales in the Premiere suite of the Florilegium Secundum, would achieve a clarity of understanding the rhythmic alteration procedure of notes inégales to a huge musical circle beyond his personal scope and of his musical circle which included his colleague Heinrich Ignaz Franz Biber's world in 17th century Salzburg, Austria.

=== Henry Purcell ===
In England, style Francese was deliberately introduced in the 17th century by order of the King, sending a 14-year-old exceptionally talented chorister and composer, the young Henry Purcell, to the Lullist court to study and master the style of Lully and the Lullist orchestra "Chapel Royal" which had become famous throughout Europe, after which Purcell was to return to England to form an English version of the Chapel Royal. Purcell's orchestral music and keyboard music are, like Muffat's synthesis of the Italian and French style, a synthesis of the English and French style into a much more complex English style where the application of notes inégales to the music of Purcell and his contemporaries is essential to correct performance of the music. Also of great importance for Purcell and his contemporaries – in explicio – are the varying versions of numerous movements from the suites with notes inégales unwritten, and written out explicitly in some MS. versions, and completely encoded in other MS. versions.

With respect to the short–long, snapped version of notes inégales, this rhythmic and stylistic feature – the lombardic snap – became a recognizable stylistic cliche in Purcell's music, and in the music of his contemporaries. The snapped pair is often stepwise, but is nearly as often found in slower textures in downward snapping pairs of notes, the second of which note, the longer, destination note, together with the first note of the notes inégales, form a diminished 4th to a leading tone (especially in minor keys), but can often be found used in various non-stepwise intervals, seemingly at odds with the "general rules" of notes inégales; nonetheless, this usage is pervasive in the music of Restoration period England by Purcell and his contemporaries.

Perhaps one of the most famous instances of notes inégales, which for many years was incorrectly heard (and played) is in the so-called "Masterpiece Theatre" trumpet tune. This famous trumpet tune is actually a French baroque work, Fanfare-Rondeau, by Jean-Joseph Mouret incorrectly attributed to Jeremiah Clarke. It is often heard played as even eighth notes, but its correct performance would almost certainly be that all of its evenly notated 8th notes would be performed in long–short notes inégales!

=== England in the Classical Period ===
Roger North prohibits the placing of triplets against duplets; and the conclusion must be that either the triplet must be assimilated into the duplet, or the duplet must be assimilated into the triplet, by subjecting the duplet into a form of notes inégales. One of the phenomena noted above was the adoption in England of notes inégales especially by Purcell and his contemporaries. In English Music during the time of Purcell, as well as just before and after, notes inégales were often applied in French modeled works, such as courants, and other "French" dance movements where the notes inégales are not written out. It must be decided on a case by case basis. However one of the forms of the notes inégales, the "Lombardic or 'scotch' snap", became very popular in English music in the post-Elizabethan period, and that predilection continued throughout the Baroque and into the Classical period. It is usually written out, but not always. The short–long notes inégales, or "scotch snap" can be found to be nearly begging for use at the ends of certain phrases, typically in a triplet based texture, and for instance especially in a Menuet that features triplets, where often at the cadential points, the triplets fall away and playing the evenly notated 8th notes seem to invite a short–long rhythmic alteration. This can also be found in the transitional music such as that found in Musicks Hand-maid, (1678), (John Playford (editor)), as well as in typically English composers such as Thomas Augustus Arne in his keyboard sonatas. Arne in particular wrote many variation movements that would sometimes start in duplets, but sometimes used a great deal of triplets, and often in the transitions one finds even notes that when leading to a triplet section, applying long–short (or even occasionally short–long) notes inégales proves very effective. This also often occurs in the Gallant, Empfindsamkeit, and Classical music of J.C. Bach and Haydn and their contemporaries. (further citations and examples to come SJ)

== Present day ==
=== Jazz ===
A similar practice to notes inégales occurs from the 20th century to the present day, in jazz, although the term "swung note" is used by jazz musicians and listeners. Indeed, it is so universally understood that a stream of eighth notes is to be rendered unequally that the phrase "straight eighths" is used whenever a jazz arranger wants a performer to play eighth notes evenly. In jazz practice, in addition, it is common for the notes not only to differ in duration but in intensity. Swung eighths written on the beat are generally read as a pair of triplet eighth-notes tied together, while notes written on off-beats are played as single triplet eighth notes. Therefore, the underlying rhythmic grid to most jazz music is an eighth note triplet pattern. Most musicians don't do the math involved in playing notes, instead simply feeling an uneven subdivision. Occasionally, sixteenth notes are swung and played fitting into a thirtysecond-note triplet grid.

The similarity to the rule of 17th-century France is striking, in that jazz is organized in rhythmic layers, with chord changes often at the level of the bar or half-bar, followed by a quarter-note beat, and an eighth-note level in which notes are played freely, and almost always unevenly. Some scholars (2) have speculated a connection by way of the influence of French music in New Orleans on early jazz styles.

=== Sacred Harp ===
Traditional Sacred Harp singers often sing in the rhythm of notes inégales, thus deviating from the printed notes; for details see Performance practice of Sacred Harp music.

== See also ==
- Dotted note

== References and further reading ==
1. Archibald Davison and Willi Apel, Harvard Anthology of Music. Two volumes. Cambridge, Massachusetts, Harvard University Press, 1949. ISBN 0-674-39300-7
2. David Fuller: "Notes inégales," in The New Grove Dictionary of Music and Musicians, ed. Stanley Sadie. 20 vol. London, Macmillan Publishers Ltd., 1980. ISBN 1-56159-174-2
- The New Harvard Dictionary of Music, ed. Don Randel. Cambridge, Massachusetts, Harvard University Press, 1986. ISBN 0-674-61525-5
- Manfred Bukofzer, Music in the Baroque Era. New York, W.W. Norton & Co., 1947. ISBN 0-393-09745-5
- Anthony Newman: Bach and The Baroque. Pendragon Press, NYC, NY, 1985, rev 1995. ISBN 0945193769
- Scott Ryan Johnson: Georg Muffat and the French Modeled works of J.S. Bach. Unpublished Manuscript, LA/NYC. 1993
- Kenneth Cooper, Julius Zsako and Georg Muffat, "Georg Muffat's Observations on the Lully Style of Performance", The Musical Quarterly. Vol. 53, No. 2 (Apr., 1967), pp. 220–245. Published by: Oxford University Press
- Georg Muffat, Edited and translated by David K. Wilson from a collation prepared by Ingeborg Harer, Yvonne Luisi-Weichsel, Ernest Hoetzl, and Thomas Binkley "Georg Muffat on Performance Practice – The Texts from Florilegium Primum, Florilegium Secundum, and Auserlesene Instrumentalmusik — A New Translation with Commentary". (1653-1704). Series: Publications of the Early Music Institute. Indiana. 2001. ISBN 978-0-253-21397-6
- Sol Babbits – details to come -
- – Frederic Neumann
- – John O'Donnell: "The Majestic Style". Early Music Magazine. Oxford University Press;- details to come -
- Anthony Newman: The Twentieth Century Interpreter of 18th Century Music". Music and Letters. – details to come -
- Anthony Newman: Bach's Prelude in B-Minor; a study in Performance Practice. The Diapason – details to come -; Dissertation, Boston University Press – details to come -
- J. Quantz "On playing the Flute". G Schirmer Music. – details to come -
- C.P.E. Bach – The True Art of Playing Keyboard Instruments – details to come – Essay on the True Art of Playing Key Board Instruments, by Carl Philipp Emanuel Bach. Translated and Edited by William J. Mitchell ISBN 0393097161
- John Byrt - An Unequal Music (An Unequal Music ISBN 978-1-5262-0506-3)
