= Livre d'orgue de Montréal =

The Livre d'orgue de Montréal is a music manuscript dating from the 18th century, which contains about 400 organ pieces. It is one of the largest surviving manuscripts of works by the French organ school from the reign of Louis XIV. It was brought to North America by Jean Girard, a French Sulpician clerk born in Bourges, appointed organist and teacher at the Notre-Dame parish in Montreal. Most of the music is anonymous, although a few pieces have been positively identified as works of Nicolas Lebègue.
