= Lambert Chaumont =

Flemish composer and organist

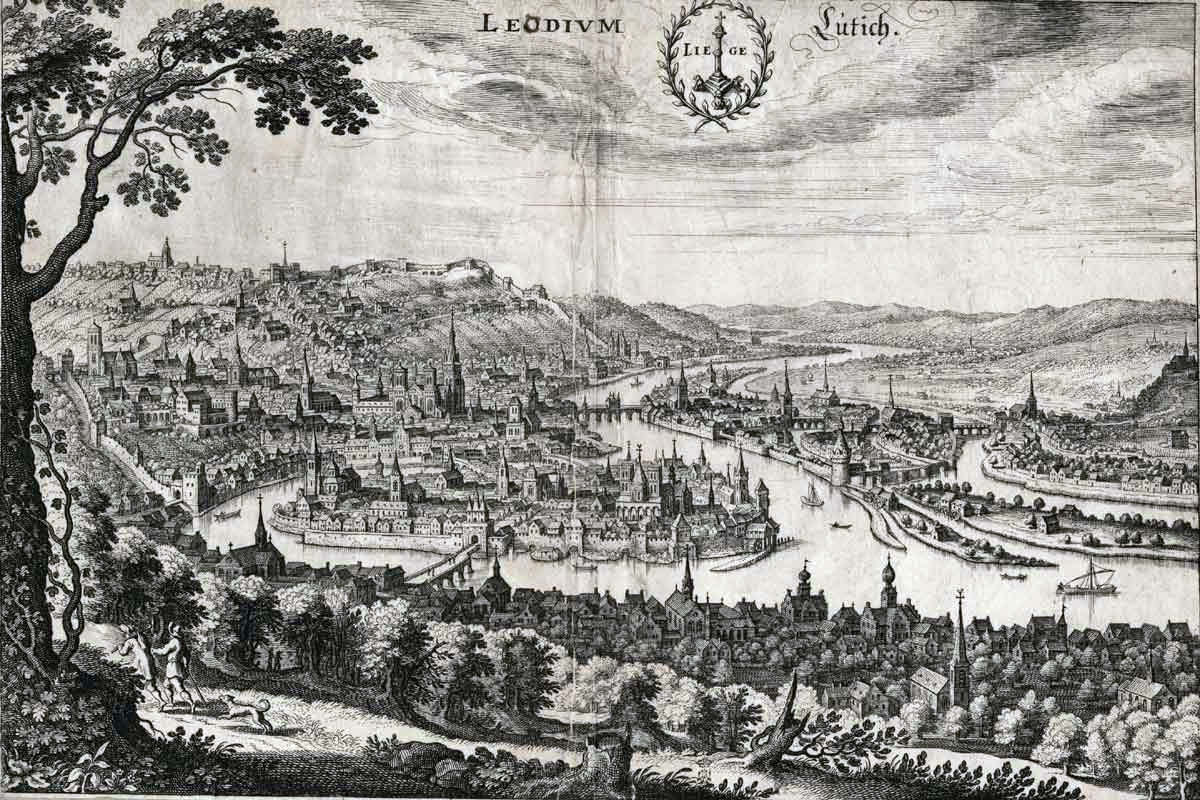
A 1650 engraving of Liège by Matthäus Merian. Chaumont was probably born in the city and spent most of his early years here.

Lambert Chaumont (c. 1630 – April 1712) was a Flemish Baroque composer and organist.

Chaumont was from the Liège area, possibly born in that city. The earliest mention of his name dates from January 1649, when he is listed as a lay brother at the Carmelite monastery at Liège. He was still there in October 1651, and then a monastery accounts entry dated 8 May 1659 lists Chaumont among the nine brothers who completed their novitiates at the monastery at Reims. Nothing is known about the next 15 years of Chamount's life. On 10 February 1674 he was made rector of the parish of St. Martin's Church at Huy. The post was insignificant, and the church and the parish were very small, but eventually Chaumont's career progressed further. On 7 September 1688 he became priest of the parish of the nearby St. Germain's Church, and pater of the Carmelites at Huy. He occupied these positions until his death in 1712.

Chaumont's extant oeuvre comprises a collection of organ music, Pièces d'orgue (Huy, 1695), and a work of piety published in 1709. At least one more collection of music is lost. Although he evidently spent most of his life in Liège and Huy, Chamount's style in his organ pieces is entirely French. His collection is usually regarded as one of the best of the French organ school of the 17th century, particularly for its fine fugues, trios, and other contrapuntal genres, which are given prominence in the collection. Pièces d'orgue comprises 111 pieces arranged in eight suites of 12 to 15 pieces each. The suites are united by mode, and follow the eight church tones. Somewhat unusually, each ends with one or two dances, mostly allemandes, although there are also two chaconnes (suites 2 and 6) and a gigue (suite 1) as well. Chaumont's writing, characterized by strong contrapuntal technique and a well-developed melodic imagination, has drawn many favorable comments from modern researchers and musicians. In a preface to a modern edition of Chaumont's works, scholar Roger Bragard claimed that the pieces impress the listener "not only by their richness and their melodic purity, but also by the undeniable strength of the technique". The renowned Belgian musicologist José Quitin wrote that the music is "distinguished by its seriousness, its convincing sense of form, the fascinating blend of sonorities and the serene elegance of the counterpoint." Willi Apel, although slightly less enthusiastic, nevertheless agreed that Chaumont was a major composer with good taste and technique, and singled out Chaumont's récits, which articulate their themes in phrases of varied length. In all of his récits Chaumont develops the melody from a single motif, which recurs at the beginning of each phrase, but is continued differently every time. In addition to music, Pièces d'orgue also includes a set of tuning instructions and two short essays, on accompaniment and plainchant.
