= Gilles Jullien =

French Baroque composer and organist

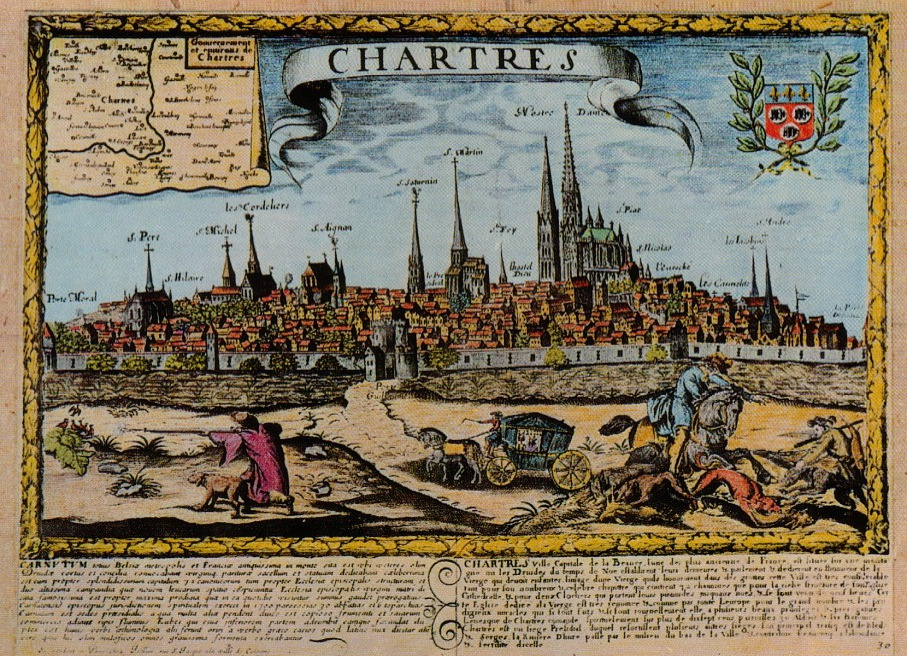
A 17th-century engraving of Chartres. The Chartres Cathedral, where Jullien worked almost his entire life, is on the right, the tallest structure in the picture.

Gilles Jullien (c. 1651/1653 – 14 September 1703) was a French Baroque composer and organist.

He is credited with bringing the style of French organ music then current in Paris to Chartres.

Almost nothing is known about Jullien's life or training. His burial certificate indicates he was 50 or slightly younger when he died, so he must have been born between 1651 and 1653. It is assumed that he became organist of the Chartres Cathedral on 6 December 1667. The date is questionable, but the fact that Jullien was appointed organist of the cathedral while still very young is indisputable. He occupied this position until his death in Chartres in 1703. He was succeeded at the cathedral by his eldest son, Jean-François Jullien.

All of Jullien's surviving music is contained in his Premier Livre d'orgue (Paris, 1690). It consists of around 80 pieces (most influenced by Nicolas Lebègue's work), organized into eight organ suites in the eight church modes. According to the preface, these works were intended for liturgical use, but the only link to the liturgy is a fugue on Ave maris stella. The suites also contain several four- and five-voice fugues that reflect Jullien's studies of counterpoint, but, like most French composers of the time, he was not particularly apt at complex polyphony, and both his fugues and his grasp of chromatic writing have been deemed primitive. The préludes and récits de dessus have been considered the most successful pieces.

Jullien's Premier Livre d'orgue has a number of interesting features. One of these is that in the preface Jullien claims to have invented five-voice genres, even though such pieces appeared earlier, in collections by Nicolas Gigault and André Raison, published in the late 1680s. Furthermore, the collection concludes, very unusually, with a choral piece, Cantantibus organis. Another vocal work by Jullien, La Crèche de Bethléem, is known by name only, and the second organ book was apparently planned, but never appeared.
