= Jean-Adam Guilain =

German-French organist and harpsichordist

Jean-Adam Guilain Freinsberg (born Johann Adam Wilhelm Freinsberg; c. 1680 – after 1739) was a German-French organist and harpsichordist who was mostly active in Paris during the first half of the eighteenth century.

== Biography ==
Little is known about his life. He was born in Germany, possibly around 1680 (the exact dates of birth and death are unknown). For an unknown reason he moved to France some time before 1702, and almost certainly became one of Louis Marchand's pupils - Guilain's organ collection is dedicated to Marchand, by then a prominent organ teacher.

He was a Catholic, though it is unknown whether he was baptised Catholic or converted later.

Guilain died some time after 1739, the year when he published a collection of harpsichord pieces.

== Compositions ==
Although of German origin, Guilain's musical style appears to be in the pure French tradition.

=== Harpsichord ===
The sole surviving copy of Guilain's only known collection of harpsichord works may be found in the collection of the British Library. The volume is entitled "PIÈCES DE CLAVECIN / D'UN GOUT NOUVEAU / PAR Mr. GUILAIN./ Gravées par De Gland Graveur du Roy./ Prix 3l./ A PARIS." and has twenty-six pieces:

- Fanfare
- Je veux garder
- Le beau B.T.
- Amis
- Ton H.C.
- Babé L.R.
- Joconde
- Mirtil
- Mon cousin
- Tircis couché
- Ma cloris
- L'autre jour
- Mamy Margot
- Ô Gué
- Pierre B.
- Les Pèlerins : 1er Air
- Les Pèlerins : 2e Air
- Boire à son tour
- Je suis encor
- Bransle de Metz
- On dit
- Allons
- La Tétard
- Menuet allemand

=== Organ ===
A single collection of organ pieces (Pièces d'orgue pour le Magnificat sur les huit tons différents de l'église) was published in 1706 in two volumes, of which only the former remains extant. The full collection includes eight suites of pieces for use with the Magnificat, one suite for each church mode. Each suite contains seven short movements that were to alternate with the vocal parts of the liturgy.

- Suite du premier ton :

Plein jeu - Trio - Duo - Basse de trompette - Récit - Dialogue - Petit plein jeu

- Suite du deuxième ton :

Prélude - Tierce en taille - Duo - Basse de trompette - Trio de flûtes - Dialogue - Petit plein jeu

- Suite du troisième ton :

Plein jeu - Quatuor - Dialogue de voix humaine - Basse de trompette - Duo - Grand jeu - Petit plein jeu

- Suite du quatrième ton :

Plein jeu - Cromorne en taille - Duo - Basse de cromorne - Trio - Dialogue - Petit plein jeu

== See also ==
- French organ school
- French baroque harpsichordists
