= Nicolas Gigault =

French organist and composer

- Born: c. 1627 near Paris, France
- Died: 20 August 1707 Paris, France
- Genres: Baroque music
- Occupations: Organist; Composer
- Instrument: Organ
- Years active: 1646–1707

Nicolas Gigault (ca. 1627 – 20 August 1707) was a French Baroque organist and composer. Born into poverty, he quickly rose to fame and high reputation among fellow musicians. His surviving works include the earliest examples of noëls and a volume of works representative of the 1650–1675 style of the French organ school.

== Life ==
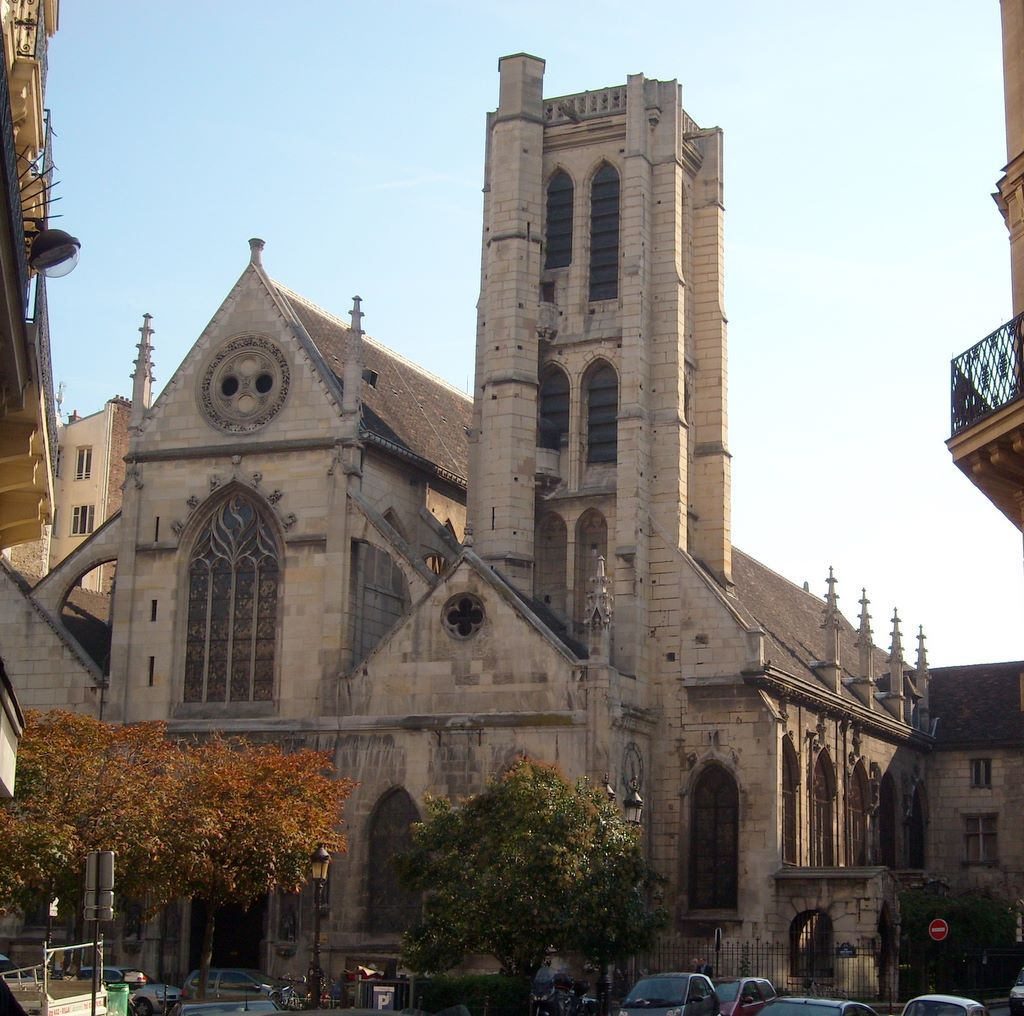
St Nicolas-des-Champs, where Gigault worked from 1652 until his death. The composer lived nearby.

Little is known about Gigault's life. François-Joseph Fétis, a 19th-century musicologist, claimed Gigault was born in Clayes-en-Brie, a village near Paris. However, no locality survives by that name. It is supposed that Gigault's birthplace was just outside Paris. A similar situation occurred concerning Gigault's date of birth: André Pirro deduced in the early 20th century that Gigault must have been born in 1624/5, however, a later study by Pierre Hardouin revealed that the composer could not have been born before 1627.

Gigault's father, Estienne Gigault, was a bailiff at the law-courts of Paris. Gigault was born into poverty and his financial situation remained dire at least until 1648, when he and his two younger brothers renounced their rights of succession to avoid their father's debts. Nicolas Gigault's mother died when he was a child. Nothing is known about his education or how he came to become a musician. Pirro suggested several possible teachers, among them Charles Racquet, but no evidence exists of any lessons. Fétis's early claim that Jean Titelouze taught Racquet is now regarded as insubstantial, since Gigault was too young and his family could not afford trips to Rouen, where Titelouze worked.

As far as is known, Gigault's career began in 1646 when he was appointed organist of Saint-Honoré. In 1652 he left to take a similar position at Saint Nicolas-des-Champs, where he worked until his death. Gigault also served as organist at Saint Martin-des-Champs from 1673, and at the Hôpital du Saint Esprit orphanage from 1685. Gigault must have had a professional relationship with Étienne Richard, who worked with him at Saint Nicolas-des-Champs, and who also was organist of Saint Martin-des-Champs until his death in 1669.

Gigault married twice. The first marriage, to Marie Aubert in 1662, produced five children: two sons and three daughters. The sons, Anne-Joseph and Anne-Joachim, became organists. Gigault's youngest daughter Emérentienne-Margueritte married an organ-builder and one of her two children, Augustin-Hypolite Ducastel, became a harpsichord-builder. Marie Aubert died on 7 August 1700. Gigault soon remarried, but himself died just a few years later, on 7 August 1707.

The inventories of Gigault's possessions, taken in 1662 and in 1700 (on the account of his marriage and his wife's death, respectively), reveal that already by 1662 he was no longer poor and could afford a well-furnished home with a collection of paintings and sculptures, and a large number of musical instruments: a chamber organ, two harpsichords (one with two manuals, the other with one), three spinets, two clavichords, a bass viol, two treble viols, a theorbo and a guitar. Most of the paintings Gigault had in his home were of a devotional nature, which, coupled with the lengthy dedications of his organ collections to the Blessed Virgin Mary, suggests an important place of religion in Gigault's life. Apart from his activities as organist, Gigault was also in demand as an organ consultant and as an instrumentalist.

== Works ==
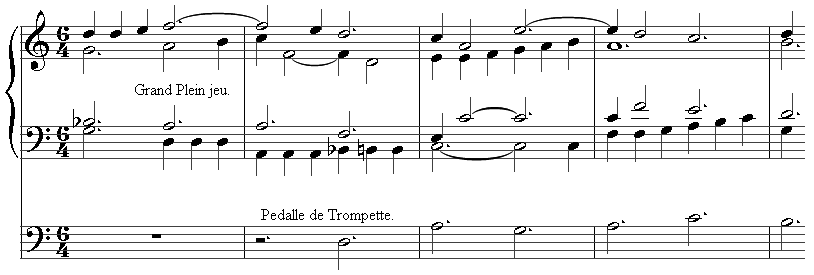
The Dernier Kyrie of the first mass is a 5-voice récit with pedal cantus firmus in the tenor, a genre cultivated by Gigault.

Gigault published two collections of organ works. The first, Livre de musique dédié а la Très Saincte Vierge of 1682, contains the earliest known examples of the French noël (a set of variations on a Christmas carol) and an allemande. Gigault's 20 noëls include variations on Christmas songs and church hymns connected to Christmas. These pieces always progress from two-part to four-part settings and feature a somewhat rigid variation technique. In the preface Gigault suggests that these pieces can be performed on any instruments: i.e., on a pair of viols, or on a lute, etc. The solitary allemande bears no connection whatsoever to Christmas. It is presented in two versions, the second being set in "ports de voix", showing various common ornamentation patterns.

Gigault's second collection, Livre de musique pour l'orgue of 1685, contains 184 pieces. It begins with three organ masses, which rely heavily on Mass IV melodies, like all other surviving French organ masses from the period. However, Gigault's contemporaries limited their use of the chant to cantus planus settings, whereas in Gigault's masses chant melodies also appear paraphrased or transformed into fugue subjects, and form a very large proportion of the masses. The first and the third masses are large, each comprising more than 20 pieces, while the second mass is extremely short with just 7 versets. The rest of the collection is arranged by mode: there are numerous fugues (a fact mentioned in the preface) and also various typical French forms such as dialogues and récits. Also included are three hymns: Pange lingua, Veni Creator and a complete setting of the Te Deum.

Because the music of Gigault's second Livre is more representative of the French style of the third quarter of the century, rather than the last, the collection may have been a compilation of earlier composed material. All major French forms are represented, although Gigault's way of naming them differs from his contemporaries: he uses the term "fugue" much more broadly (e.g., he uses "Fugue à 2" instead of "Duo"), never uses the term "dialogue", etc. The music is notated meticulously, with more attention to details of performance than in other contemporary sources. There is much use of notes inégales, so much that some scholars believe the music to be unlistenable today, and in general, Gigault's work was judged negatively by most scholars. Nevertheless, the music is distinguished by a serious style, more suitable to the church than that of Lebègue; Gigault's dialogues go beyond those of his contemporaries, Nivers and Lebègue, in that they employ more divisions, and he also cultivates a number of five-voice genres: préludes and récits with pedal cantus firmus in the tenor. Gigault's 1685 Livre was most probably meant as a record of Gigault's style, rather than a book for lesser organists; the music is at times quite sophisticated and requires a high degree of skill.
