= Corrette =

Corrette is a surname. Notable people with the surname include:

- Gaspard Corrette (c. 1670–before 1733), French composer and organist
- Michel Corrette (1707–1795), French organist, composer, and author of musical method books. He was the son of Gaspard.
