= Charles Piroye =

French organist and composer

Charles Piroye (c. 1668–1672 – 1724) was a French Baroque organist and composer.

== Biography ==
Very little is known about his life, and even the dates of his birth and death have not yet been determined. He may have been born in Paris. His teachers were Jean-Baptiste Lully and Michel Lambert, but some of the surviving music suggests not their influence, but that of Marc-Antoine Charpentier. From 1690 to 1712 Piroye was organist of the Jacobins Church at Rue Sainte-Honoré, and from 1708 to 1712 organist at Saint-Honoré. He started publishing his music at least as early as 1695; a tax register from that year lists him among the organists of the second rank (the "first rank" included François Couperin, Louis Marchand, and others). By 1712 he was evidently very well known, for the publisher of Piroye's Pièces choisies mentioned the composer's exceptionally high reputation ("each day renewed applause") in the preface. Évrard Titon du Tillet, writing in 1732, referred to Piroye as one of the "most able organists recently deceased", providing the only clue as to when the composer died. Another clue of the composer's death can be found in the archives of the church Sainte-Catherine of Lille, indicating a "Dnus Carolus piroÿt organicus cantor expertissimus hujus Ecclesie" (Master Charles Piroÿt organist [and] expert church musician) dead on March 3rd of 1724.

Piroye's organ works from Pièces choisies (Paris, 1712) cover much more ground than the French organ school tradition of the period. Most of his works are not fugues, hymn settings, trios, etc., but dialogues between different choirs of the organ. They all have descriptive titles: La Béatitude, La Paix, L'Allégresse, L'Immortelle, La Brillante, La Royal. Other works by Piroye also show a distinct, individual style.

== List of works ==
- 3 livres d'airs sérieux et à boire (Paris, 1695–1697)
- 9 airs in Recueil d'airs sérieux et à boire de différents auteurs (Paris, 1695–1724)
- Cantique pour le temps de noël, for soprano and basso continuo (Paris, 1703)
- Jephté, tragedy (1703)
- Le retour d'Eurydice aux enfers, for soprano, 2 violins or 2 flutes, and basso continuo (after 1710; an afterpiece for Louis-Nicolas Clérambault's Orphée (1710, from the first book of cantatas))
- Pièces choisies [...] tant pour l'orgue et le clavecin, que pour toutes sortes d'instruments de musique (Paris, 1712): 5 large organ pieces (Simphonies)
- Premier livre de clavecin (lost)
- Messe de M. Biroat

== Free Scores ==
- Free scores by Charles Piroye at the International Music Score Library Project (IMSLP) Organ pieces.
