= French organ school =

French musical style

The French organ school formed in the first half of the 17th century. It progressed from the strict polyphonic music of Jean Titelouze (c. 1563–1633) to a unique, richly ornamented style with its own characteristic forms that made full use of the French classical organ. Instrumental in establishing this style were Louis Couperin (c. 1626–1661), who experimented with structure, registration and melodic lines, expanding the traditional polyphonic forms, and Guillaume-Gabriel Nivers (1632–1714), who established the distinct forms and styles of what was to become the French organ tradition.

== Characteristic forms and nomenclature ==
French organ composers cultivated four major genres: masses, hymns, suites and noëls. Noëls are variations on Christmas carols, whereas the first three genres were all realized as collections of brief pieces in various characteristic forms. Such forms included the following:

- Récit: a piece in which a single voice emerges soloistically above all others by means of special registration. The latter is usually indicated in the title, i.e. in a Récit de Cromorne the solo voice would be played using the cromorne stop. Cromorne, cornet, tierce, nasard, trompette and voix humaine are the most commonly encountered solo stops. The titles of such compositions frequently omit the word "récit" and simply indicate the registration (Cromorne, Cornet, etc.) and/or the position of the solo voice. Typical combinations include the following:

Dessus de Cromorne: the solo voice is in the soprano (dessus), played using the cromorne stop
Tierce en taille: the solo voice is in the tenor (taille), played using the tierce stop
Basse de Trompette: the solo voice is in the bass (basse), played using the trompette stop

- Dialogue: a piece which constantly alternates between two different registrations. A Dialogue sur les grands jeux would be alternatively played on the Grand orgue (Great) and the Positif.
- Fugue: usually, three- or four-voice polyphonic pieces that adhere more or less strictly to the imitative style. The designation Fugue grave indicates a piece of a serious character, whereas the Fugue gaie (or gaye) is its opposite. Rarely, four-voice fugal pieces bear the title Quatuor ("quartet"). Nicolas de Grigny cultivated five-voice fugues.
- Echo: phrases are played twice, quieter on the second time, giving the impression of an echo. This impression is heightened in echos that repeat only the endings of phrases. Such pieces used specially designed echo divisions.
- Prélude: mostly homophonic pieces in duple or quadruple meter. They are almost invariably used as introductory movements.

Additionally, a number of standard registrations may be indicated by the following designations:

- Plein jeu: combination of the organ's principals and flutes, with the mixtures also included.
- Grand jeu: a loud combination, based on the reed stops, frequently used in homophonic sections of larger pieces or standalone movements.

The designations dessus, taille and basse stand for "soprano", "tenor" and "bass", respectively. A rarely used type of voicing is haute-contre (or haulte contre), "high tenor". Such designations are used to point to the position of the solo stop in a récit (see examples above), or of the chant melody in a setting (i.e. the title Kyrie en basse indicates that the chant itself is in the bass).

== Composers ==
=== First period: the development of free polyphony ===
- Jean Titelouze (c. 1563–1633)
- Charles Racquet (1598–1664)
- Louis Couperin (c. 1626–1661)
- François Roberday (1624–1680)
- Nicolas Gigault (c. 1627–1707)

=== Second period: the establishing of the French Classical Organ School ===
- Nicolas-Antoine Lebègue (1631–1702)
- Guillaume-Gabriel Nivers (1632–1714)
- Jean-Nicolas Geoffroy (1633–1694)
- Jean-Henri d'Anglebert (1635–1691)
- André Raison (c. 1640–1719)
- Lambert Chaumont (c. 1645–1712)
- Gilles Jullien (1650/53–1703)
- Jacques Boyvin (c. 1650–1706)
- Mathieu Lanes (1660–1725)
- Pierre Dandrieu (c. 1660–1733)
- François Couperin (1668–1733)
- Charles Piroye (c. 1668/72– c. 1728/30)
- Louis Marchand (1669–1732)
- Gaspard Corrette (1671–before 1733)
- Nicolas de Grigny (1672–1703)
- Pierre Dumage (1674–1751)
- Jean-Adam Guilain (c. 1675/80 –after 1739)

=== Third period: 18th century ===
- Louis-Nicolas Clérambault (1676–1749)
- Jean-François Dandrieu (c. 1682–1738)
- François d'Agincourt (1684–1758)
- Louis-Antoine Dornel (1685–1765)
- Christophe Moyreau (c. 1690– c. 1772)
- Louis-Claude Daquin (1694–1772)
- Guillaume-Antoine Calvière (1695–1755)
- Pierre Février (1696– after 1762)
- Jean Girard (1696–1765)
- Dom George Franck (c. 1700/10– after 1740)
- Louis Archimbaud (1705–1789)
- Michel Corrette (1707–1795)
- Louis Bollioud-Mermet (1709–1794)
- Claude-Bénigne Balbastre (1724–1799)
- Armand-Louis Couperin (1727–1789)
- Jean-Baptiste Nôtre (1732–1807)
- Jean-Jacques Beauvarlet-Charpentier (1734–1794)
- Josse-François-Joseph Benaut (c. 1743–1794)

=== Late 18th century and post-revolutionary period ===
- Guillaume Lasceux (1740–1831)
- Nicolas Séjan (1745–1819)
- Jean-Nicolas Marrigues (1757–1834)
- Gervais-François Couperin (1759–1826)
- Jean-Baptiste Charbonnier (1764–1859)
- Jacques-Marie Beauvarlet-Charpentier (1766–1834)
- François-Louis Perne (1772–1832)
- Alexandre Pierre François Boëly (1785–1858)
- Louis-Nicolas Séjan (1786–1849)

== See also ==
- French baroque harpsichordists
- German organ schools
- List of organ composers
- Organ repertoire
