= Pierre Dandrieu =

French priest, composer and organist

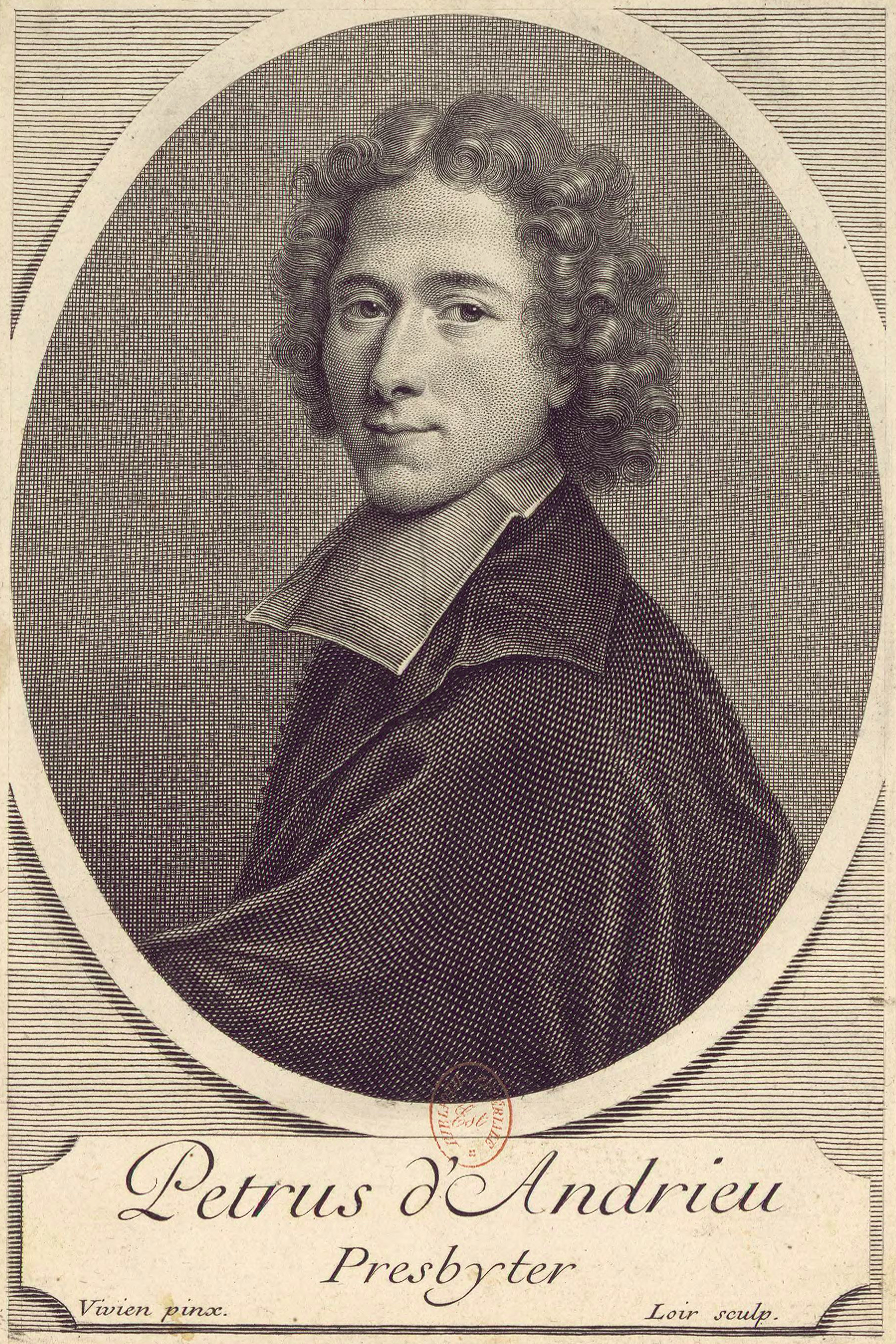
- Portrait of Pierre Dandrieu after Joseph Vivien. Engraving by Loir
- Born: March 1664
- Died: 20 October 1733 (aged 69); Paris
- Occupations: Baroque composer; Classical organist; Harpsichordist

Pierre Dandrieu (d'Andrieu) (baptised in Angers on 21 March 1664 – 20 October 1733) was a French priest, composer and organist.

== Life ==
Pierre Dandrieu was baptised in Angers. After studying with Lebègue, he held the organ of Saint-Barthélemy church, now destroyed, on the île de la Cité in Paris, for more than 40 years. His nephew Jean-François Dandrieu succeeded him to this same gallery in 1733.

Dandrieu died in Paris on 20 October 1733.

== Works ==
Pierre Dandrieu published around 1714 a book of 42 Noëls and various pieces for the organ (mainly) or harpsichord, published again between 1721 and 1733 (c. 1725 according to the BnF) :

NOELS. / O Filii, Chansons de Saint Jacques, / Stabat Mater, et Carillons. / Le Tout Revû augmenté / et Extrêmement Varié, et mis pour L’Orgue / Et pour le Claveçin. / par Mr. Dandrieu / Prêtre et Organiste de St. Barthelemy / À Paris. (s. d.)

1. À la Venue de Noel
2. Une Jeune Pucelle
3. Chantons je vous prie Noel hautement
4. Or nous dites Marie
5. Joseph est bien Marie
6. Voici le jour Selemne
7. Je me suis Levé
8. Marchons, Marchons Gaïement
9. Adam ou est tu
10. Chretien qui Suivez l’Eglise
11. Nous Sommes en voïe
12. Puer nobis Nascitur
13. Grace soit rendüe a Dieu de la Sus
14. Savez-vous mon cher Voisin
15. Mais ou san est allé Nau
16. Quand je M’Eveillai et eus assez dormi
17. Chantons je vous prie
18. Vous qui desirez Sans fin
19. Noel cette Journée
20. Quand le Sauveur Jesus-Christ fut né de Marie
21. Sortons de nos Chaumines
22. Joseph tu fus bien Joyeux
23. Chantons de voix Hautaine
24. Noel pour l’Amour de Marie
25. Laissez paitre vos bestes
26. Tous les Bourgeois de Châtres
27. Chantons je vous prie Noel hautement
28. Quoi ma voisine es tu fâchée
29. Allons voir ce divin gage
30. Michau qui causoit ce grand Bruit
31. Une Bergere Jolie
32. Le Roy des Cieux vient de Naître
33. Ou s’en vont ces gais Bergers
34. A minuit fut fait un Reveil on MusOpen
35. A minuit fut fait un Reveil
36. Jacob que tu es habile
37. Si c’est pour ôter la Vie
38. Stabat mater
39. O Filii et Filiæ
40. Chanson de Saint Jacques
41. 2e Chanson
42. Carillon ou Cloches

Several of these pieces were later taken back and reworked (by his nephew Jean-François ?), and published in 1759, more than 20 years after the nephew's death.

He also published 3 arias in Recueils d'airs sérieux et à boire at Ballard, in Paris: Mes yeux par leur langueur extrême (August 1697), L'amour s'est fait pour la jeunesse and Petits oyseaux sous ces feuillages (April 1699).

== Sources ==
- Honegger, Marc et al. Dictionnaire de la Musique : Les Hommes et leurs œuvres, Paris, Bordas, 1970.
- GALLICA. Bibliothèque nationale de France, Music department, VM7-1839.
- Persée (web portal) Notes on Roger Hugon's modern reprint in 1979.
- David Fuller. "Dandrieu." Grove Music Online. Oxford Music Online. Oxford University Press, accessed 12 October 2017.

== See also ==
- List of French harpsichordists
- French organ school
- Noël varié
