= Gaspard Corrette =

French composer and organist

Gaspard Corrette (c. 1671 – before 1733) was a French composer and organist.

He was born around 1671, probably in Rouen, Province of Normandy, where he served as the organist for the church of St-Herbland. In approximately 1720 he moved to Paris. The exact date of his death is not known. His son, Michel Corrette, also was a musician, composer, violinist, harpsichordist and organist.

== Works ==
The only surviving work by Corrette is an organ mass in the eighth Church Mode, published in 1703. The mass consists of 24 pieces, all in Tone 5, except for the Elevation which is in Tone 1.

Messe du 8e Ton pour l’Orgue à l’Usage des Dames Religieuses, et utile à ceux qui touchent l’orgue.

- Premier Kyrie - Grand Plein Jeu
- Fugue
- Cromhorne en Taille
- Trio à deux dessus
- Dialogue à deux Choeurs
- Gloria In Excelsis - Prélude à deux Choeurs
- Concert pour les Flûtes
- Duo
- Récit tendre pour le Nasard
- Dialogue de Voix humaine
- Basse de Trompette ou de Cromhorne
- Dessus de Tierce par accords
- Tierce en Taille
- Dialogue à deux Choeurs
- Graduel - Trio
- Offerte - Grand dialogue à trois Choeurs
- Premier Sanctus - Plein Jeu
- Second Sanctus - Duo
- Élévation - Cromhorne en Taille
- Plein Jeu à deux Choeurs pour le premier Agnus Dei
- Dialogue en Fugue, pour le Second Agnus Dei
- Deo Gratias - Grand Plein Jeu
- (Autre) Graduel - Basse de Trompette ou de Cromhorne
- (Autre) Élévation - Fond d'Orgue

The composition is the last mass written in the great French tradition established in the 16th century and seen in works of François Couperin and Nicolas de Grigny, among others.

== See also ==
- French organ school
