= Mathieu Lanes =

French harpsichordist, organist and composer

Mathieu Lanes (1660–1725 in Toulouse) was a French harpsichordist, organist and composer.

== Life ==
Almost nothing is known about him, except that he was organist and choir master of the Saint-Étienne Toulouse Cathedral at the beginning of the 18th century.

== Works ==
He is known by a 134-page manuscript entitled Petites Pièces d'orgue de M. Lanes (1710–1722), with 90 anonymous parts for the organ, and harpsichord pieces by François Couperin. (Le Rossignol en amour, Double du Rossignol en amour, Fanfare pour la suite de Diane, La Voluptueuse), kept at the Library of the municipal conservatory of Toulouse (Res. Mus. Cons. 943).

Some pieces such as the Gavote, the Rondeau, the Piémontoise and the Sonata in G major were likely to be played on the harpsichord.

=== Modern reprints ===
- Petites pièces d’orgue de Mathieu Lanes, ed. Norbert Dufourcq, Roger Hugon, Janine Alaux and Roberte Machard. Paris: Société française de musicologie, Heugel, 1970. - XVII-91 p.

== Discography ==
- France Orgue discography by Alain Cartayrade.

== See also ==
- French organ school
