= Jean Girard =

Jean Girard (8 August 1696 – 23 February 1765) was a French organist, serpent player, and schoolmaster who was primarily active in Canada. He was one of the first professional musicians living and working in the city of Montreal.

Born in Bourges, Girard initially intended to become a priest and entered the seminary of the Society of Saint-Sulpice in his native city in 1720. However, he was never ordained and instead began his career as a singing master at the seminary at the Église Saint-Sulpice, Paris in 1724. The following July he sailed across the Atlantic to Canada where he remained for the rest of his life. From 1724 until his death in 1765 he served as the organist of the Notre-Dame Church in Montreal. He also was active as a teacher.

He is mainly known for the voluminous book of French organ music he collected and brought with him from Paris; an anonymous collection known as the Livre d'orgue de Montréal.
