= Plein jeu =

On classical French organs, the plein jeu is a principal-based plenum registration. It includes the Montres, Bourdons, Prestants and Doublettes (Principals 16′, 8′, 4′ and 2′) and the Fournitures and Cymbales (lower- and higher-pitched mixtures). The classical French organ also allows for a reed-based registration; the grand jeu, which used a loud combination of reed stops (usually consist of trompette 8′, Clarion 4′, Prestant 4′ and Cornet séparé (or Cornet V), which comprises Bourdon 8′, 4′, 2′, Nasard 2 2/3′, Tierce 1 3/5′.) in homophonic sections of larger pieces or standalone préludes.

On French romantic organs, (e.g. the organs of Aristide Cavaillé-Coll), Plein-jeu also has been the name of a single organ stop, being a mixture.

On English organs, it is sometimes also known as Furniture (Fourniture, Fr.). The 'Plein Jeu' is a mixture stop voiced fairly boldly where a powerful effect is needed, particularly when added to the Great Diapason Chorus. A typical IV rank might be 19 22 26 29 in the bass.

Many organ builders use the name Plein-jeu for a compound ranks stop. When a single key on the organ is pressed, four or more notes sound, each at octave and fifth relationships to each other. Three ranks of pipes sound three notes, and two ranks sound two notes, and so forth. As the stop progresses upward on the keyboard, the notes "break" back to the next lower octave or fifth. This stop is used to add depth, clarity, and definition and power to an entire organ compass, or just an ensemble of stops.

Sometimes the abbreviation "PJ" is notated in scores of French classical school music, where it carries the meaning "Petit Jeu" rather than "Plein Jeu".
