= Jean Titelouze =

French Catholic priest and composer

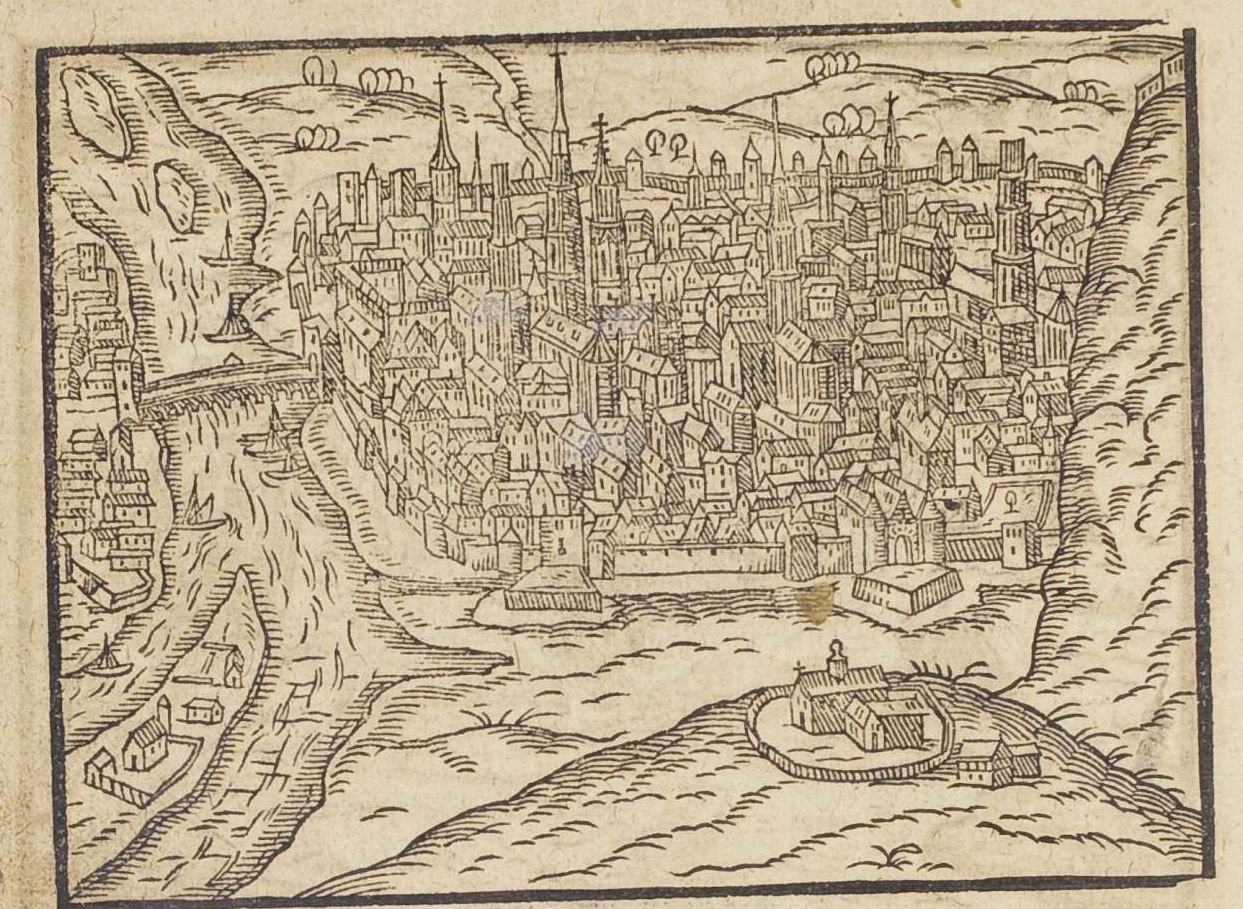
The city of Rouen in 1610. Titelouze spent most of his life here, working as organist of the Rouen Cathedral.

Jean (Jehan) Titelouze (c. 1562/63 – 24 October 1633) was a French Catholic priest, composer, poet and organist of the late Renaissance and early Baroque periods. He was a canon and organist at Rouen Cathedral. His style was firmly rooted in the Renaissance vocal tradition and as such, was far removed from the distinctly French style of organ music that developed during the mid-17th century. However, his hymns and Magnificat settings are the earliest known published French organ collections, and he is regarded as the first composer of the French organ school.

== Life ==
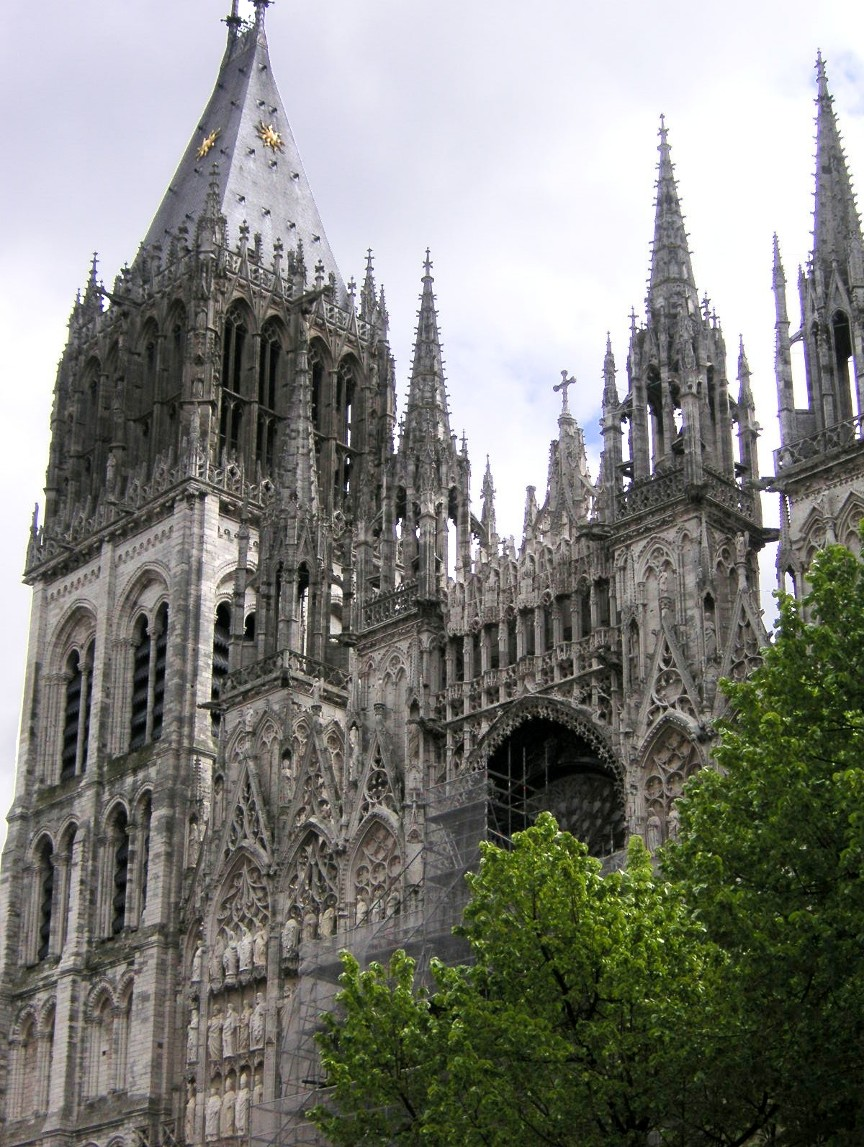
The Rouen Cathedral, where Titelouze worked from 1588 until his death in 1633.

In a 1930 study, Amédée Gastoué suggested that the surname Titelouze may be of English or Irish origin (more specifically, derived from "Title-House"), but recently this supposition has been disproven, and "Titelouze" is now linked to "de Toulouse". Titelouze was born in Saint-Omer in 1562/3 (his exact date of birth is unknown) and educated there; by 1585, he entered the priesthood and served as organist of the Saint-Omer Cathedral. He moved to Rouen later that year and in 1588, succeeded François Josseline as organist of the Rouen Cathedral. His work was not limited to Rouen: he also acted as organ consultant and helped with the installation and repair of important instruments in various cities.

In 1600, Titelouze invited the famous Franco-Flemish organ builder Crespin Carlier to Rouen to work on the cathedral organ. The result of this collaboration was referred to by contemporary critics as the best organ in France. This instrument and Carlier's later work in France defined the French classical organ. Titelouze occasionally collaborated with Carlier on various instruments. In 1604, Titelouze was naturalized French (at the time, Saint-Omer, where Titelouze was born, was part of the Spanish Netherlands). In 1610, he was appointed one of the Rouen Cathedral's canons. In 1613, he won his first award from Rouen's literary society, the Académie des Palinods, for his poems.

The year 1623 saw publication of Titelouze's Hymnes de l'Eglise, a collection of organ settings of various plainchant hymns to be used during the liturgy. The same year, due to health problems, Titelouze partially retired from his organist position (although he kept the post until his death). In 1626, he published a second organ collection, Le Magnificat, that contained eight Magnificat settings. In 1630, he received another award from the Académie des Palinods and was made "Prince des Palinods". He died three years later.

Titelouze was a friend of Marin Mersenne, an important French music theorist, mathematician, philosopher and theologian. Seven letters survive from their correspondence, dated from 1622 to 1633. Titelouze gave Mersenne advice on L'Harmonie Universelle, published from 1634 to 1637. Although the strict polyphonic style of Titelouze's music soon disappeared from French organ music, his influence was still felt for some time after his death. As an example, the Parisian composer and organist Nicolas Gigault included a fugue à la maniere de Titelouze (literally "in Titelouze's style") in his 1685 Livre de musique pour l'orgue. Some three hundred years later, the composer inspired one of Marcel Dupré's organ works, Le Tombeau de Titelouze, op. 38 (1942).

== Works ==
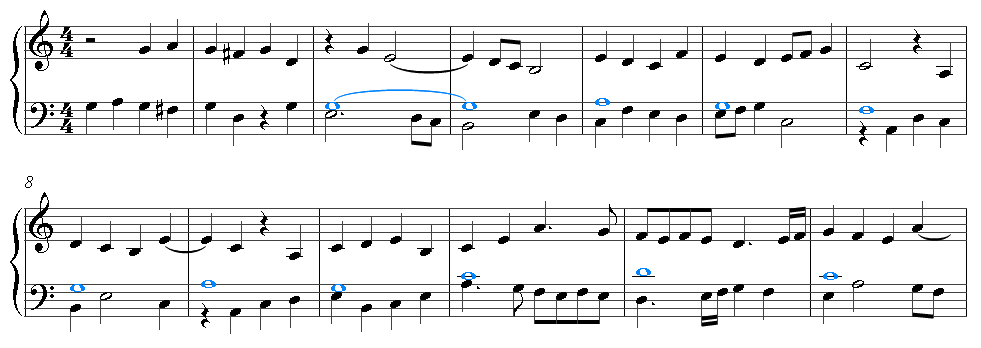
Example 1. Opening bars of Titelouze's 3rd verset of Veni Creator. The hymn in the tenor is highlighted. The outer voices form a canon at the octave; in the other two canonic versets in the 1623/4 collection, Titelouze created canons at the fifth (and the hymn is in the soprano voice [Conditor], or bass [Ave maris stella]).

Titelouze's surviving output comprises two collections of organ pieces. These are the first published collections of organ music in 17th century France. The first, Hymnes de l'Église pour toucher sur l'orgue, avec les fugues et recherches sur leur plain-chant (1623, 2nd edition in 1624), contains 12 hymns:

1. Ad coenam (4 versets)
2. Veni Creator (4 versets)
3. Pange lingua (3 versets)
4. Ut queant laxis (3 versets)
5. Ave maris stella (4 versets)
6. Conditor alme siderum (3 versets)
7. A solis ortus (3 versets)
8. Exsultet coelum (3 versets)
9. Annue Christe (3 versets)
10. Sanctorum meritis (3 versets)
11. Iste confessor (3 versets)
12. Urbs Jerusalem (3 versets)

Every hymn begins with a verset with a continuous cantus firmus: the hymn melody is stated in long note values in one of the voices, usually the bass, while the other voices provide contrapuntal accompaniment. Other versets are only occasionally cast in this form. More frequently the 16th century motet practice is used: the hymn melody either migrates from one voice to another, with or without imitative inserts between verses, or is treated imitatively throughout the piece. In three versets (Veni Creator 3, Ave maris stella 3, and Conditor 2) the melody in one voice is accompanied by two voices that form a canon, in two (Ave maris stella 4 and Annue Christe 3) one of the voices provides a pedal point. In most versets, counterpoints to the hymn melody engage in imitation or fore-imitation, and more often than not they are derived from the hymn melody. All of the pieces are in four voices, except the canonic versets, which use only three.

The second collection, Le Magnificat ou Cantique de la Vierge pour toucher sur l'orgue suivant les huit tons de l'Église, published in 1626, contains eight Magnificat settings in all eight church modes. There are seven versets in each setting, presenting the odd-numbered versets of the canticle, with two settings of Deposuit potentes:

1. Magnificat
2. Quia respexit
3. Et misericordia
4. Deposuit potentes, first setting
5. Deposuit potentes, second setting
6. Suscepit Israel
7. Gloria Patri et Filio

In the preface, Titelouze explains that this structure makes these Magnificat settings usable for the Benedictus. Save for the introductory ones, all of the versets are fugal. Most feature two main points of imitation: the first concludes on the mediant cadence of the mode, and so, Titelouze writes, the organist can shorten any verset during the service by substituting this cadence with one on the final. Most fugue subjects are derived from the chant; there are many double fugues and inversion fugues in the collection. Four-voice polyphony is employed throughout the collection. The music is much more forward-looking than in the Hymnes (see Example 2 for an excerpt from one of the inversion fugues).

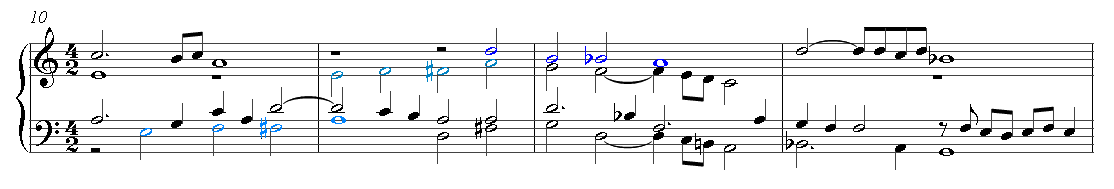
Example 2. Bars 10–13 from the second setting of Deposuit potentes from Magnificat primi toni. In this inversion fugue (the subject is highlighted with shades of blue), like in much of the rest of the collection, Titelouze's musical language is more progressive than in any of the 1624 hymns.

Although French organs already had colorful solo stops at the time, Titelouze did not use them. According to the prefaces of both collections, he was concerned with making his pieces easier to play and playable by hands alone. Titelouze goes as far as suggesting, in the preface to Hymnes, to alter the music if it is too difficult to play.

== Media ==
Conditor alme siderum
