= Charles Racquet =

French organist and composer

Charles Racquet (1597–1664) was a French organist and composer, best known for his monumental organ Fantaisie.

He came from a large family of Parisian organists and himself was appointed organist of Notre-Dame de Paris at an early age, in 1618. He held the post until shortly before his death and was succeeded by another member of the Racquet family. He also served as musician to Marie de' Medici (a post that his father Balthazar occupied earlier) and to Anne d'Autriche, the Queen Mother. Racquet was very highly regarded by his contemporaries: his pupils included the famous lutenist Denis Gaultier (who wrote a tombeau on his teacher's death), Jesuit scholar Marin Mersenne was a close friend of his. In the 18th century writer Jean-Benjamin La Borde named Racquet "the best organist of his time."

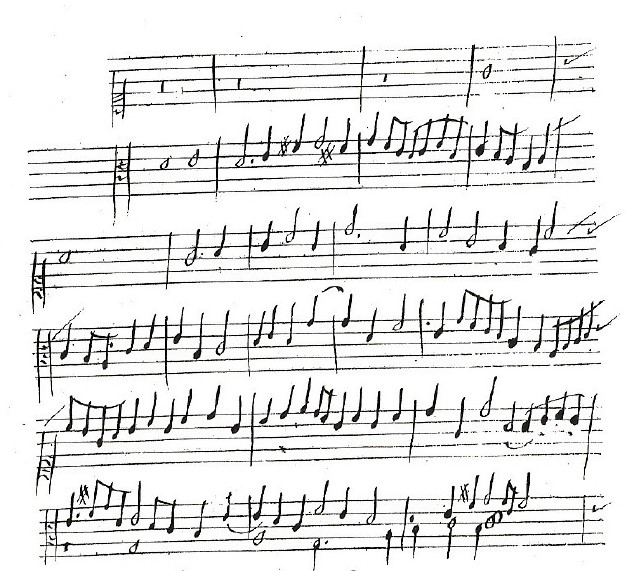
First staves of the Fantasie by Charles Racquet

Of Racquet's music only a single organ Fantaisie and Douze versets de psaume en duo sur les douze modes (12 duos on psalm verses) survive, in Mersenne's Traité de l'harmonie universelle (1636). The fantasia, written upon Mersenne's request to "show what could be done at the organ", is one of the most famous pieces of the French organ school. It is inspired by Dutch music, particularly that of Sweelinck: a single theme is developed through several sections, most of them imitative. The theme of the Fantaisie is the Marian antiphon Regina coeli, as described by Mersenne alongside the specific organ registrations Racquet employed, including the characteristic French Plein-Jeu combining mixtures with principals and bourdons. Beyond composition, Racquet also undertook a significant renovation of the Notre Dame organ beginning in 1618, commissioning organ builder Valéran De Héman for a two year project that replaced some 300 rusted pipes and added new stops, including a boucquin complementing the existing medieval keyboard.The layout is as follows:

- Section 1: traditional imitative counterpoint with several countersubjects
- Section 2: imitative counterpoint on an ornamented version of the subject, with faster counterpoints
- Section 3: subject in augmentation, stated once in each voice
- Section 4: a bicinium duplici contrapuncto, a two-voice section in which the subject in its original form is combined with sixteenth-note figures in the other voice
- Section 5: a toccata above a pedal point

Racquet’s Fantaisie is a unique piece in the entire French keyboard repertory, with few, if any, comparable works written in France.
