= Pierre Du Mage =

French organist and composer (1674–1751)

- Born: 23 November 1674 (baptised); Beauvais, France
- Died: 2 October 1751 (aged 76)
- Genres: Baroque music
- Occupations: Organist; Composer
- Instrument: Organ
- Years active: 1703–1719

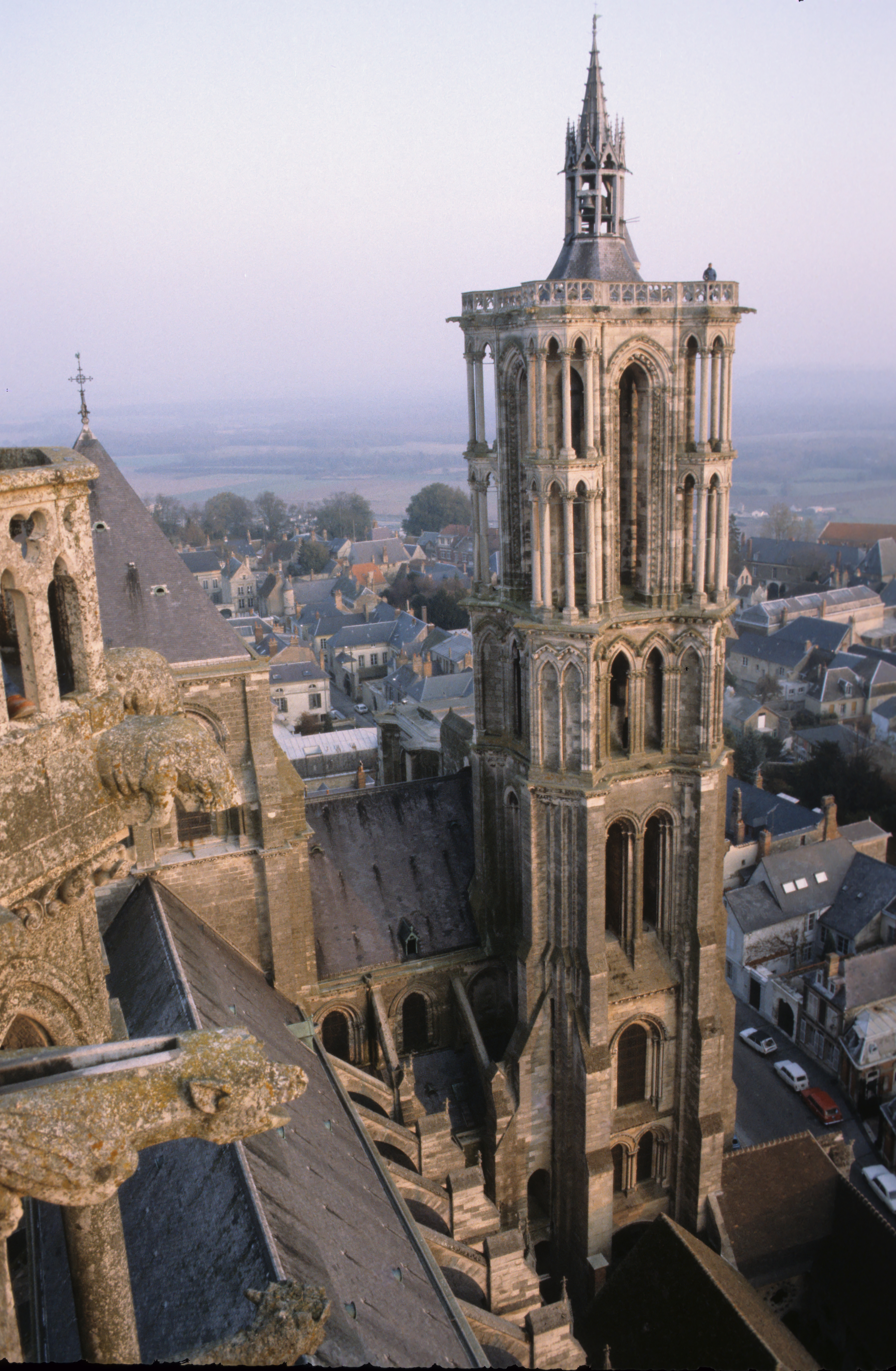
South tower of Laon Cathedral, where Du Mage worked from 1710 to 1719

Pierre Du Mage (also Dumage; baptised 23 November 1674 – 2 October 1751) was a French Baroque organist and composer. His first music teacher was most likely his father, who was the organist at Beauvais Cathedral. At some point during his youth, Du Mage moved to Paris and studied under Louis Marchand. He also befriended Nicolas Lebègue, who in 1703 procured for him a position as the organist of the Collegiate Church of Saint-Quentin. In 1710, Du Mage was appointed the titular organist of Laon Cathedral. Due to strained relations with his superiors in the cathedral chapter, Du Mage left on 30 March 1719, at the age of 45, and became a civil servant. He apparently neither played nor composed music professionally again until his death.

Du Mage's only surviving work is Premier livre d'orgue, published in 1708. This collection is dedicated to the chapter of Saint Quentin. It contains a single Suite du premier ton, comprising eight pieces in the traditional French forms: Plein jeu, Fugue, Trio, Tierce en taille, Basse de Trompette, Récit, Duo and Grand jeu. In the brief preface to the collection, Du Mage explains that these are his first works, modelled after the music of his former teacher Marchand. His music is, however, of very high quality, and entirely representative of French organ music of the period. Musicologists Félix Raugel and Willi Apel both singled out the Récit for its "delicate and gentle lyricism", and Apel also praised the Tierce en taille and the Grand jeu as particularly striking. Du Mage presented a second livre d'orgue (now lost) to the chapter of Laon Cathedral in 1712.
