= Louis Marchand =

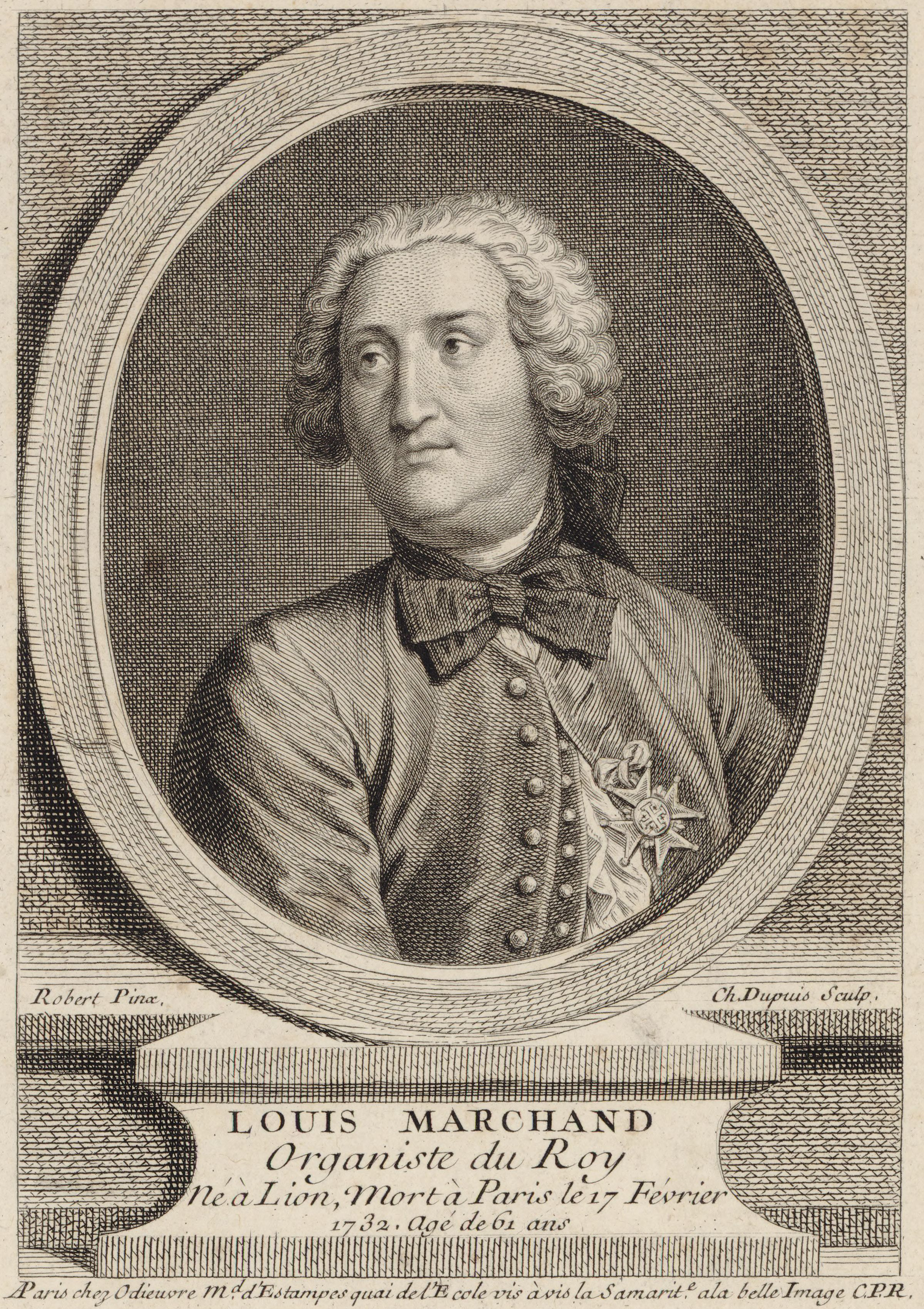

Background information
- Born: 2 February 1669
- Origin: France
- Died: 17 February 1732 (aged 63)
- Genres: Baroque
- Occupations: Musician, composer
- Instruments: Organ; harpsichord

Louis Marchand (2 February 1669 – 17 February 1732) was a French organist, harpsichordist and composer. Born into an organist's family, Marchand was a child prodigy and quickly established himself as one of the best known French virtuosos of his time. He worked as organist of numerous churches and, for a few years, as one of the four organistes du roy. Marchand had a violent temperament and an arrogant personality, and his life was filled with scandals, publicized and widely discussed both during his lifetime and after his death. Despite his fame, few of his works survive to this day, and those that do almost all date from his early years. Nevertheless, a few pieces of his, such as the organ pieces Grand dialogue and Fond d'orgue have been lauded as classic works of the French organ school.

== Life ==
Marchand came from a musical family: his grandfather, Pierre (d.1676) had been a schoolmaster and music teacher and his three sons, Jean (Marchand's father), Pierre and Louis were organists. Pierre held the incumbency at Auxonne for some years before his death in 1684; Louis became curé at the church of Saint-Maurice Pontailler-sur-Saône, 15 kilometres from Auxonne after 1 January 1676, where he remained until his arrest for the abduction and rape of 'paroissiennes'. [His sentence of death was commuted to servitude on the galleys and he died in Marseilles in 1694.] Jean was an organist at the cathedral of Clermont Ferrand before the family moved to Nevers in 1684, where Jean was to serve at the church of Saint Martine. As a child, the future composer showed exceptional talent: posthumous account, by Évrard Titon du Tillet, states that already at the age of 14 he was offered the prestigious position of organist at the Nevers Cathedral. We must be circumspect about this, however, since there is no documentary evidence of Marchand's time in Nevers, other than a contract he countersigned with his father engaging the services of Pierre Bridard to enlarge the Saint Martin organ. By age 20 he settled in Paris, and married the daughter of the harpsichord builder Jean Denis. According to his marriage contract, he was by that time organist at the church of Eglise Saint-Jacques on Paris's South Bank. Future tenures were to be held at Saint-Benoît-le-Bétourné, the church of the Cordeliers Convent and the church of Saint-Honoré Abbey. In June 1708, he was appointed as one of the four Organists du Roy for which he received a stipend of 600 livres. His duties were to play for the July–September quartier of the year. It is not known why he left Paris for a three-year sojourn in Germany in 1713, which was to include performing for various electors and the emperor. After his return to France Marchand once again settled in Paris and worked as organist for the Cordeliers Convent, augmenting his income with teaching.

Virtually all contemporary accounts contain lavish praise of Marchand's keyboard talents, yet most writers also mention that the composer had an extremely colorful and unpredictable personality. This combination of prodigious skill and bizarre temperament resulted in numerous anecdotes, scandals, and rumors recounted in various sources, only some of which are fully reliable. Several, however, are well documented: soon after his arrival in Paris, he became embroiled in a plot along with the organ builder Henry Lesclop, to defame the newly-appointed organist-priest at Saint-Bartelémy (which Marchand coveted), Pierre Dandrieu, Marchand coerced a pregnant sixteen-year-old girl to complain in a now lost letter to the organist of the Grand Couvent des Jacobins that Dandrieu was the father of the child. Dandrieu filed a complaint against Lesclop and during the ensuing investigation the girl withdrew her accusation.

On a domestic front things did not fare much better: he beat his wife, who successfully divorced him in 1701 with a settlement of 2,000 livres '... qu’il a reçüe faisant partie de sa dot avec les intérêts suivant l’ordonnance du jour ...’ . Edward Higginbottom suggests that the extended German tour was an attempt to escape his ex-wife's demands, but this is unlikely. A contemporary account by Friedrich Wilhelm Marpurg (in Historisch-kritische Beyträge zur Aufnahme der Musik, 1754–55) gives a different reason: it wasn't his ex-wife Marchand was escaping from, but the French king, whom Marchand insulted. After an unfavorable remark made by Louis XIV about Marchand's hands, the composer responded with an improper retort about the king's ears. Still another account claims that after Marchand's wife had left him, Louis XIV ordered half the composer's salary to be withheld and paid to her. Marchand, in response, broke off in the middle of a mass where he was playing and, when the king questioned him, responded, "Sire, if my wife gets half my salary, she may play half the service."

Another anecdote was first related in Dictionnaire des artistes (1776) by Louis-Abel de Bonafous, l'abbé de Fontenay:

'The desire to learn his art led him at a very young age to the capital; but without recommendations or friends, he was soon destitute of all kinds of assistance. He entered by chance into the chapel of the College of Louis le Grand at the moment when the organist was expected to begin the divine office. He asked to play the organ, which was granted to him only after repeated requests because they mistrusted his abilities. But scarcely had he put his hands on the keyboard than he astonished all the listeners. The Jesuits showed him great affection; they retained him in their college and contributed to his education by furnishing him with what was necessary to perfect his happy dispositions'.

By contrast, Titon du Tillet's biography states that, on Marchand's arrival to Paris he was offered virtually all of the vacant positions of the city's churches, because the composer's reputation was so high. But perhaps the most famous anecdote about Marchand is the account of the competition he was supposed to have with Johann Sebastian Bach in Dresden in September 1717. According to later accounts by Marpurg, Jakob Adlung and other German sources (who incidentally were not born at the time; besides, the story is not found in any French documents), the two composers were to have a contest in harpsichord performance, and Marchand fled before Bach's arrival, apparently out of fear of being defeated. The reality, however, is probably quite different: it was rumoured that Marchand, who had been in Dresden and had performed before the king, was to be offered a position as organist at the Royal Chapel, much to the chagrin of its musicians. The court Konzertmeister, Jean-Baptiste Volumier, probably invited Bach to compete against Marchand on behalf of colleagues annoyed by the latter’s arrogance and erratic behaviour and it was possibly sensing the political hornet’s nest he would be getting into if he were to accept a position at the chapel that caused Marchand to abruptly leave the scene. The story is only related in German sources, with a varying degree of embellishments by Bach's later biographers such as Johann Nikolaus Forkel. Bach's respect for Marchand's abilities, however, was recorded by the same Jakob Adlung, who witnessed Bach playing Marchand's harpsichord suites "ingeniously" and from memory.

== Works ==
Fond d'orgue
Performed in 2010, duration is 1:40

Basse de Trompette for Organ (excerpt)

Comparatively few works by Marchand survive, most of them dating from the early stages of his career. The most numerous and arguably most important are his organ works. The twelve that were published by the Boivin atelier in 1740 are likely to be a reproduction of a book of organ pieces that were published in January 1700, of which no extant copies are known. A further 42 pieces are to be found in a manuscript that was housed in the Bibliothèque royale at Versailles. These pieces include a number of important pieces: the massive Grand Dialogue (1696), a harmonically adventurous Fond d'orgue, the Quatuor, a four-part fugue that was quintessential to French organist-composers, and a Plein jeu with a canon in double pedals. Modern scholar Geoffrey Sharp divided Marchand's organ oeuvre into three distinct groups: pieces influenced by vocal genres, pieces influenced by instrumental genres, and vocal-instrumental hybrid works. He singles out Marchand's organ trios and non-contrapuntal works as the composer's most successful pieces.

The extant pieces for harpsichord are contained in two suites. The first was originally published 'chez l'auteur' in 1699 with plates engraved by Claude Roussel. It was reissued in 1702 under the auspices of Christophe Ballard as Livre Premier; a Livre Second was published simultaneously. Stylistically, the suites are disparate. Livre Premier begins with a measured prélude that is more reminiscent of Frescobaldi than any French paradigm, yet the dances are distinctly in le goût français; Livre Second begins with a prélude non mesuré yet its accompanying dances look forward to a more italianate style. In addition are two attributions in a Ballard publication of 1707 Pièces choisies pour le clavecin de différents auteurs: La Vénitienne and La Bandine. In 2005, a recording was released of a manuscript entitled Livre de Suittes pour le clavecin composé par Monsieur de Charman(t) [sic] cordelier, et arrangé par Renard, à Paris, 1754. This came to light in a private music collection in 2003 and reputedly contains a collection of pieces by Marchand in C major and minor. We are told that the current owners have no desire for the disclosure of their details or for its contents to be made available to scholars and musicians. No other reference to the works is to be found: its liner notes refer to a yet-to-be-published article by an untraceable musicologist. Although the recording’s contents are charming, it reveals a collection of works in the Italian style that could have been written by any number of composers. [The lack of cooperation from the owners has frustrated a number of musicologists, which has led to doubts concerning the collection’s authenticity.]

== Legacy ==
Jean-Philippe Rameau was among Marchand's admirers, and his pupils included Pierre Dumage and Louis-Claude Daquin. Dumage praised his teacher in the preface to his Premier livre d'orgue (1708), one of the most important works from the late years of the French organ school. Marchand's contemporary Pierre-Louis D'Aquin De Château-Lyon even compared the composer to François Couperin, claiming that, while Couperin had more art and application, Marchand had a more natural, spontaneous musicianship. In addition to his music, Marchand also wrote a treatise on composition, Règles de la composition, which theorist Sébastien de Brossard considered an excellent, albeit short, work.

Although today most of Marchand's extant pieces are regarded as unimportant by most scholars, a few have expressed the opposite view. French musicologist and writer Philippe Beaussant described the composer's work thus: "Though his compositions are skilfully written, their mastery is not obviously admirable as such. They need to be studied closely before they are found to be very great music."
