= Willi Apel =

German-American musicologist (1893–1988)

Willi Apel (10 October 1893 – 14 March 1988) was a German-American musicologist and noted author of a number of books devoted to music. Among his most important publications are the 1944 edition of The Harvard Dictionary of Music and French Secular Music of the Late Fourteenth Century.

== Life and career ==
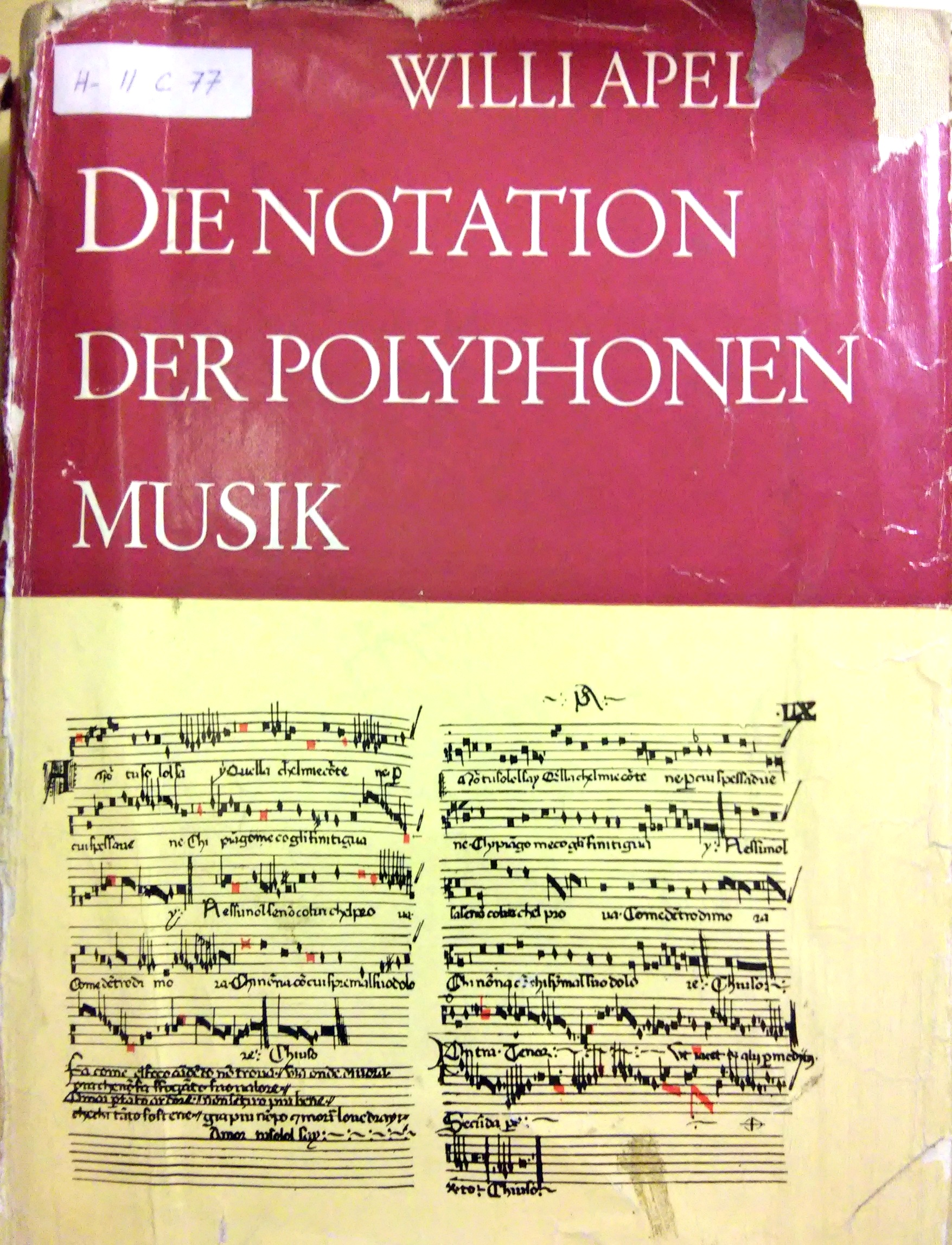
Apel Notation

Apel was born in Konitz, West Prussia, now Chojnice in Poland. He studied mathematics from 1912 to 1914, and then again after World War I from 1918 to 1922, in various universities in Weimar Germany. Throughout his studies, he had an interest in music and taught piano lessons. He then turned to music full-time, and essentially taught himself about musicology. He received his Ph.D. in 1936 in Berlin (with a dissertation on 15th and 16th century tonality) and immigrated to the US the same year. He taught at Harvard University from 1938 to 1942, but moved on to spend twenty years at Indiana University School of Music in Bloomington beginning in 1950. In 1972 he was awarded an honorary doctorate by the university.

Apel's work of the 1940s included books of broad scope, such as The Harvard Dictionary of Music (1944), which he edited, and Historical Anthology of Music (1947–1950, co-authored with Archibald Thompson Davison). His approach was to give as much attention to Medieval, Renaissance and world music as was given to familiar subjects such as Mozart and Beethoven; this influenced the higher music education in the US. His book on the notation of early polyphonic music was also written in the 1940s, and still serves as one of the essential works on the subject.

In 1950 Apel's interest in early polyphonic notation resulted in an important edition, French Secular Music of the Late Fourteenth Century. In 1958 he published a large work on plainchant, which provided a comprehensive guide of the repertoire and its sources. In early 1960s he founded the Corpus of Early Keyboard Music (CEKM), a series of editions devoted to early keyboard music. Over the years, CEKM presented the music of less known composers such as Johann Ulrich Steigleder, Bernardo Storace, Peeter Cornet, and others, and also included modern editions of various important manuscripts such as the 16th century Jan z Lublina tablature. Apel was the general editor for CEKM and edited a total of ten volumes; his pupils provided dozens more.

1967 saw the publication of Geschichte der Orgel- und Klaviermusik, a large work on the history of keyboard music. An English translation (by Hans Tischler) appeared in 1972. Apel's last book was a collection of essays from 1973 to 1981, all dedicated to Italian violin music of the 17th century.

Willi Apel died at age 94 in Bloomington, Indiana.

== Major works ==
- The Notation of Polyphonic Music 900–1600 (1942)
- Harvard Dictionary of Music (1944) (editor)
- Masters of Keyboard (1947)
- Historical Anthology of Music Volume I: Oriental, Medieval and Renaissance Music, (1947) (with Davison)
- Historical Anthology of Music Volume II: Baroque, Rococo and Pre-Classical Music, (1950) (with Davison)
- Gregorian Chant (1958)
- The History of Keyboard Music to 1700 (1967, English edition published 1972)
- Italian Violin Music of the Seventeenth Century (1983, English edition published 1990)
