= Nicolas de Grigny =

French organist and composer (1672–1703)

- Born: 8 September 1672 (baptised); Reims, France
- Died: 30 November 1703 (aged 31) Reims, France
- Genres: Baroque music
- Occupations: Organist; Composer
- Instrument: Organ

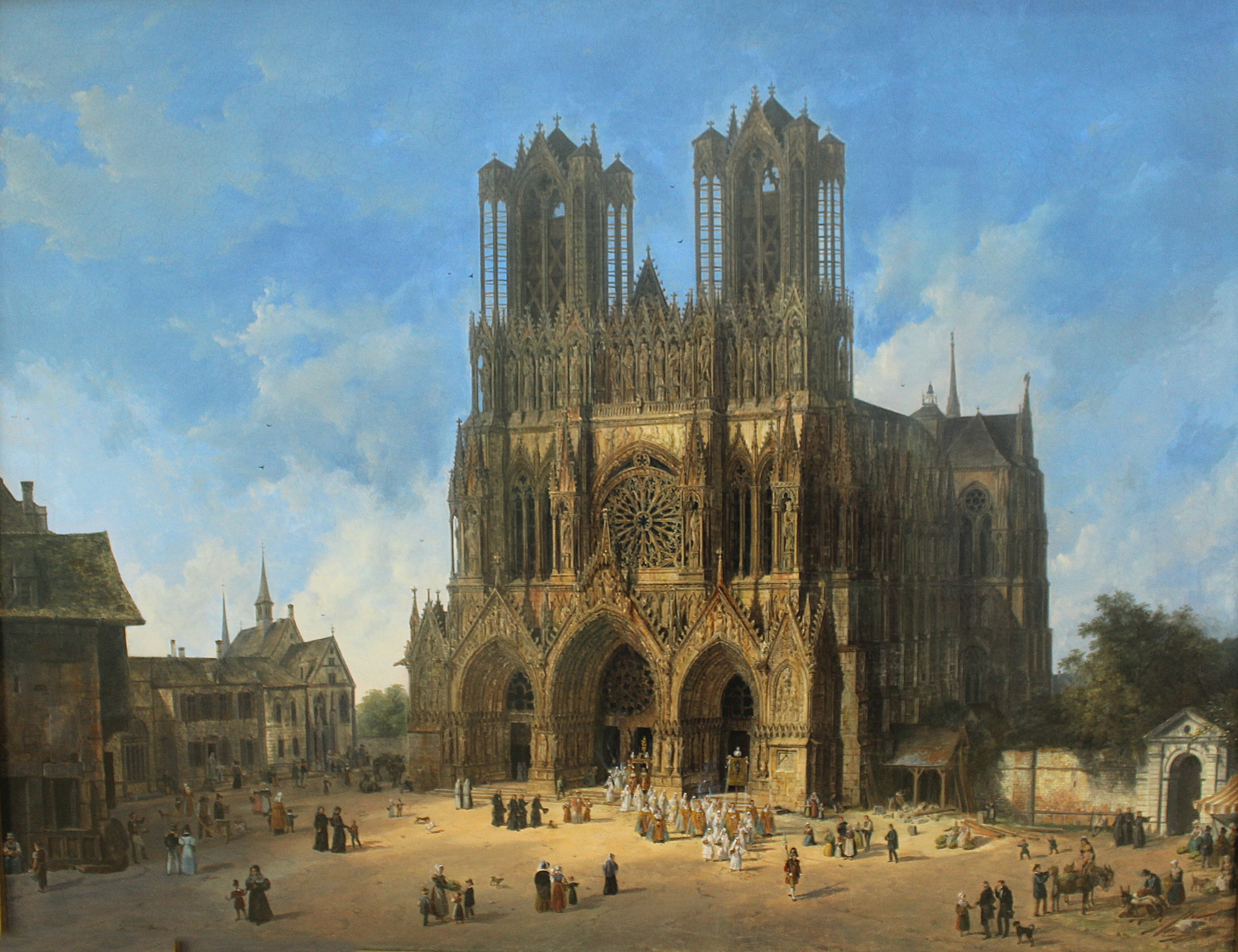
Notre-Dame de Reims, where Grigny spent his final years, Domenico Quaglio the Younger, c. 1800

Nicolas de Grigny (baptized 8 September 1672 – 30 November 1703) was a French organist and composer. He died at the age of 31, leaving behind a single collection of organ music and an ouverture for harpsichord.

== Life ==
Nicolas de Grigny was born in Reims in the parish of Saint-Pierre-Le-Vieil. While his exact date of birth is unrecorded, he was baptized on 8 September 1672. He was born into a family of musicians: his father, grandfather, and uncle Robert were organists at Reims Cathedral, the Basilica of Saint-Pierre, and the Church of Saint-Hilaire, respectively. Few details regarding his life survive, and nothing is known of his formative years.

Between 1693 and 1695, he served as organist of the abbey church of Saint-Denis, in Paris, where his brother André de Grigny was sub-prior. During this period, Grigny studied with Nicolas Lebègue, who was by then one of the leading French keyboard composers. In 1695, Grigny married Marie-Magdeleine de France, the daughter of a Parisian merchant. He returned to his hometown shortly thereafter; the birth record of his first son indicates that Grigny was residing in Reims by 1696. The couple ultimately had seven children.

By late 1697, Grigny was appointed titular organist of Notre-Dame de Reims; the exact date of his appointment remains unknown. In 1699, the composer published his Premier livre d'orgue contenant une messe et les hymnes des principalles festes de l'année (First organ book containing a mass and the hymns for the principal feasts of the year) in Paris. Grigny died in 1703 at the age of 31, shortly after accepting a position at Saint-Symphorien, a parish church in Reims. His Livre d'orgue was reissued in 1711 through the efforts of his widow. The collection circulated outside France, where it was copied in 1713 by Johann Sebastian Bach and later by Johann Gottfried Walther.

== Work ==
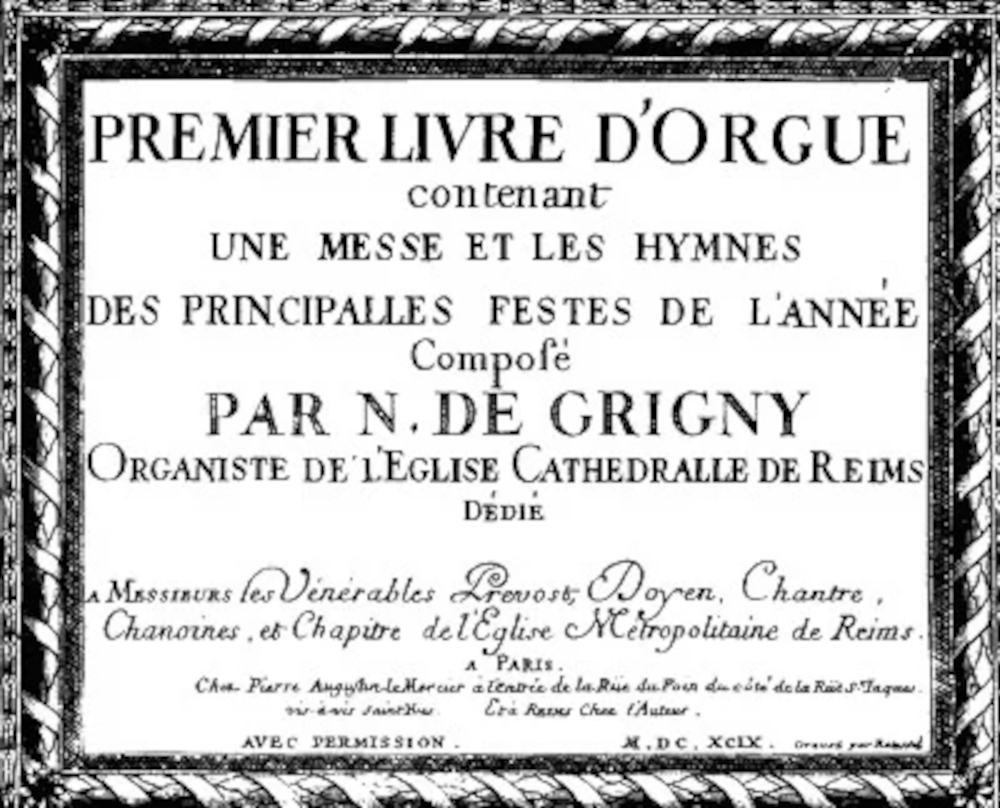
Title page of the 1699 edition of the Premier livre d'orgue

Point d'orgue

Nicolas de Grigny's surviving music consists of a large volume of organ works, the Premier livre d'orgue (Paris, 1699; second edition 1711), and a single ouverture for harpsichord. The 1711 reissue of his organ collection was the only edition known until 1949, when a single surviving copy of the 1699 printing was discovered at the Bibliothèque nationale de France. The original edition was published by Christophe Ballard using the plates prepared by the engraver Claude Roussel. The first modern edition, published by Alexandre Guilmant in 1904, was based on the 1711 reissue.

Unlike many contemporary French livres d'orgue, Grigny's publication contains no preface. The collection is divided into two sections: a mass setting, and settings of five hymns for the principal feasts of the liturgical year: Veni Creator (five versets), Pange lingua (three versets), Verbum supernum (four versets), Ave maris stella (four versets), and A solis ortus (three versets). The volume comprises 42 pieces in total.

The mass is structured with five Kyrie versets, nine Gloria versets, an Offertory, two Sanctus versets, one Benedictus verset, an Elévation, two Agnus Dei versets, a Communion, and an Ite, missa est verset. As specified by the Caeremoniale Parisiense (1662), Grigny bases the mass on the chant Cunctipotens genitor Deus, stating the chant melodies in the first and last Kyrie, the Gloria, and the first Sanctus and Agnus Dei. The collection also features a point d'orgue, a movement built upon a pedal point.

== See also ==
- French organ school
