= Nicolas Lebègue =

French Baroque composer, organist and harpsichordist (1631 - 1702)

Nicolas-Antoine Lebègue (also Le Bègue; c. 1631 – 6 July 1702) was a French Baroque composer, organist and harpsichordist. He was born in Laon and in the 1650s settled in Paris, quickly establishing himself as one of the best organists of the country. He lived and worked in Paris until his death, and frequently made trips to other cities to consult on organ building and maintenance matters. Lebègue's reputation today rests on his keyboard music. He made particularly important contributions to the development of the French organ school by devising pieces with independent pedal parts and developing the Tierce en taille genre. His oeuvre also includes the earliest published unmeasured preludes, as well as some of the earliest known noëls (Christmas songs).

== Life ==
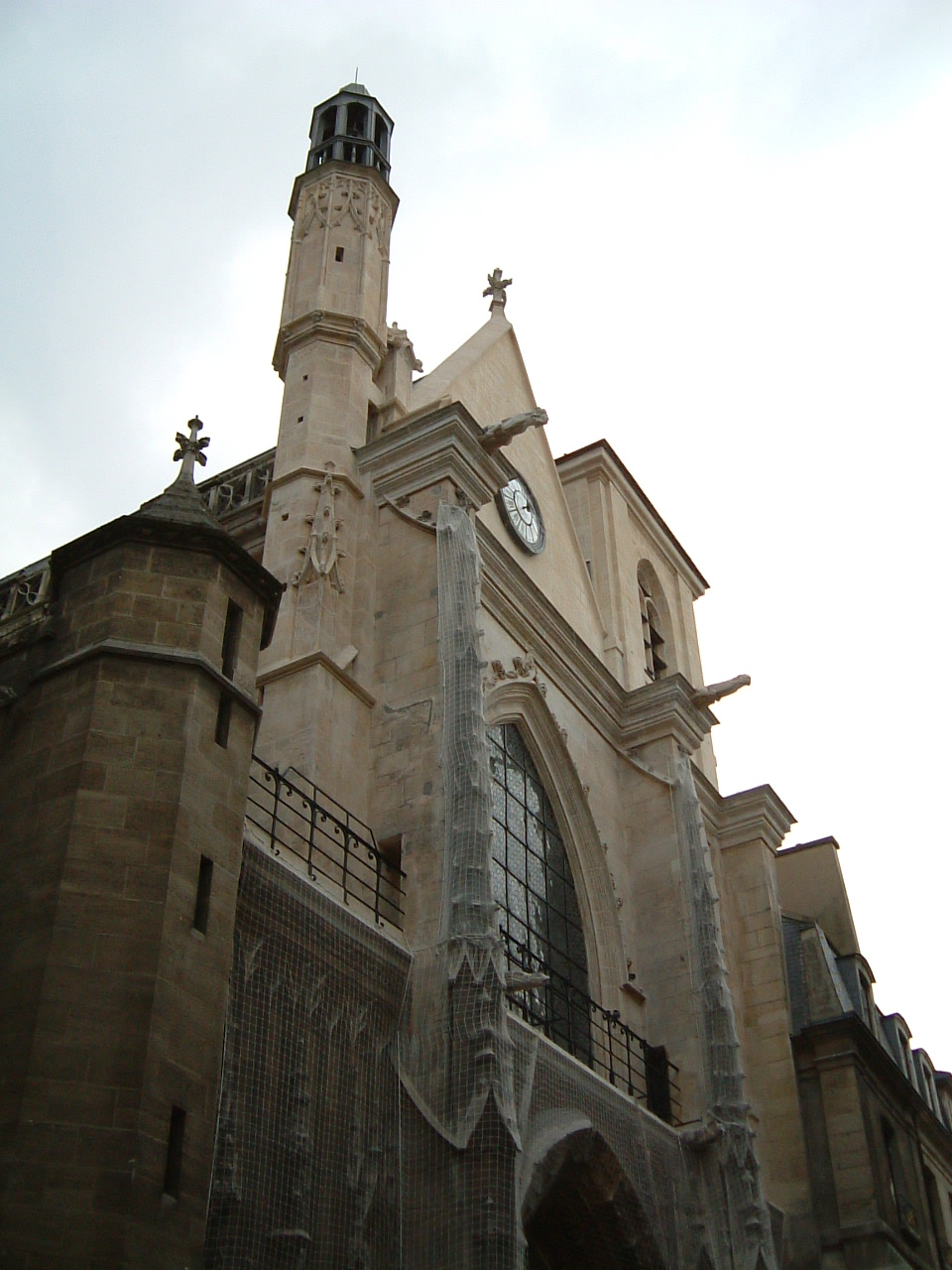
Church of Saint-Merri, where Lebègue worked from 1664 until his death.

Lebègue was born in Laon, and nothing certain is known about his early years or training. It may be possible that his uncle (also named Nicolas Lebègue), a maître joueur d'instrument, played some role in Lebègue's music education. Equally little is known about the circumstances of Lebègue's move to Paris: the first reference to Lebègue is found in a 1661 document, in which the composer is already described as "the famous Parisian organist", so by then he must have lived and worked in the city long enough to secure a solid reputation. Although this must mean he held at least one organist's position in Paris, where he worked is unknown. The only post he is known to have held is at the church of Saint-Merri, where he worked since from 18 December 1664 until his death. Lebègue started publishing his music in 1676, and in 1678 was selected to become one of the organistes du Roi ("organist to the King"), a prestigious position he shared with Guillaume-Gabriel Nivers, Jacques-Denis Thomelin, and Jean-Baptiste Buterne.

The surviving copies of Lebègue's music are very numerous, indicating he was popular. He was also known as an expert on organ building: in this capacity, Lebègue travelled as far as Bourges, Blois, Chartres, Soissons, and Troyes. Lebègue was an influential teacher whose pupils include François d'Agincourt, Nicolas de Grigny, and probably Jean-Nicolas Geoffroy, and Gilles Jullien. It was also through Lebègue that Pierre Dumage received his first important position, at the Saint-Quentin collegiate church.

== Works ==
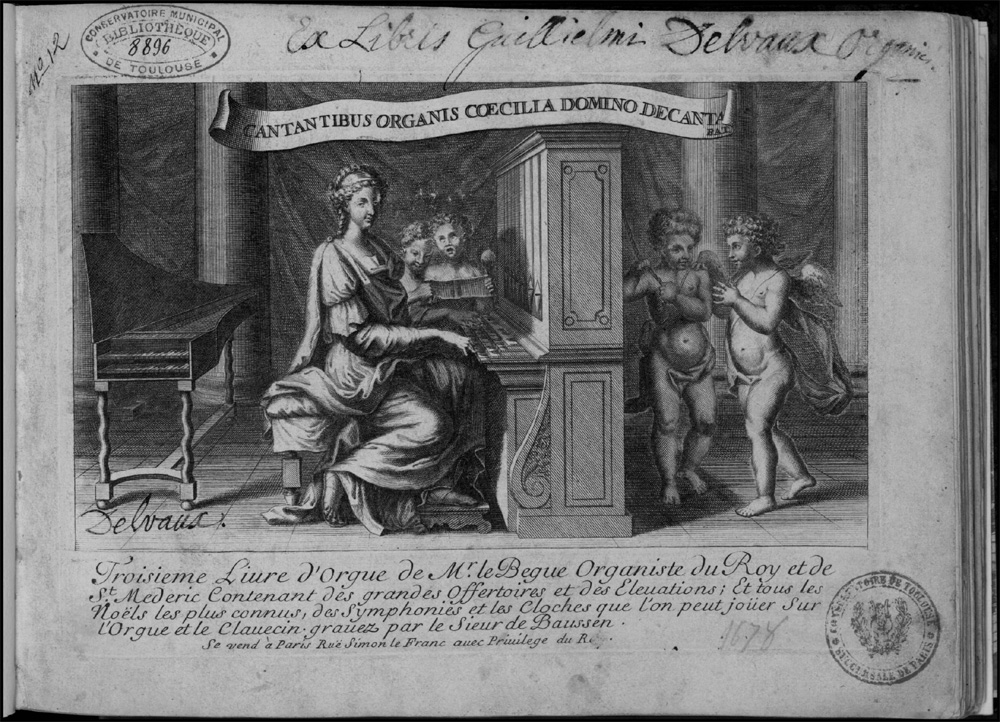
Title page of Troisieme livre d'orgue

Les pièces de clavessin, 1676 (complete score)

Lebègue's historical importance lies in his keyboard music, of which he published five collections (all published in Paris):

- Les pièces d'orgue (1676): 8 organ suites in the eight Church Modes
- Les pièces de clavessin (1676): harpsichord suites
- 2e livre d'orgue (1678): a mass and Magnificat settings for organ
- 3e livre d'orgue (1685): ten offertories, four symphonies, nine noëls, eight élévations and a program piece, Les cloches
- Second livre de clavessin (1687): harpsichord suites

A few more pieces for harpsichord and some 20 works for organ survive in manuscript copies. Lebègue's harpsichord music continues the tradition established by Jacques Champion de Chambonnières and Louis Couperin. In the unmeasured preludes of the first book (the earliest published compositions of this kind) he uses a modified version of Couperin's abstract notation: the modifications, as Lebègue writes in the preface, aim "to present the preludes as simply as possible", and the pieces themselves are much shorter and simpler than Couperin's. To this end, he used mixed note values, as opposed to Couperin's whole notes throughout. No composers adopted Lebègue's notation, however, and his second collection of harpsichord music did not include unmeasured preludes. Another important aspect of Lebègue's harpsichord style is the tendency towards standardization: many of the suites begin with an allemande-courante pair, in still others it is followed by a sarabande, and then a gigue. Lebègue was also more formal than his predecessors in naming his compositions: none have the descriptive titles usually associated with the French harpsichord school.

Les pièces d'orgue, Lebègue's first published organ collection, comprises eight suites, covering all eight modes. It is generally believed to be one of the finest French organ collections of the era, and also one of the most important for the development of the French organ school. Lebègue was probably the first among French composers to introduce independent pedal parts in his pieces. He also developed one of the most characteristic forms of French organ music—the [Récit de] Tierce en taille—as well as the trio à deux dessus, a three-voice polyphonic work with two parts for the right hand and one for the left (which is different from the other French organ trio form, the trio à trois claviers, in which the organist must use two manuals and pedal). Compared to these innovative works, the pieces in Lebègue's second book are tame, probably because the composer deliberately set out to write for amateurs and beginners (as is indicated in the publisher's preface). The third organ collection presents many different types of pieces, some incorporating Italian influences (Première élévation), others modelled after Lully's orchestral overtures (the four symphonies). The nine noëls (variations on Christmas carols) are some of the earliest surviving examples of the genre.

Only a few non-keyboard pieces by Lebègue are preserved: one hymn and a collection of motets published in 1687 in Paris as Motets pour les principales festes de l'année. While the hymn is a simple pseudo-plainchant tune, the motets are important, expertly crafted works, innovative in their use of the organ not as basso continuo throughout, but, in certain sections, as a concertante voice in the texture. They were composed for the Benedictine nuns of the convent of Val-de-Grâce. Other works, including a Vespers for two choirs, are lost.
