= Marie-Anne Couperin =

- Born: 11 November 1677; Paris, France
- Died: Unknown
- Occupations: Organist and harpsicordist

Marie-Anne Couperin was a 17th-century French organist and harpsichordist and a member of the musically prominent Couperin family, which included generations of famous composers and organists.

Born 11 November 1677 in Paris, Marie-Anne was baptized at the church of Saint-Louis-en-l'Isle in Dordogne, France on 14 November. Although there are conflicting reports of her parentage (due to the similarity of names reused in the extended family), one credible source says her parents were Francois Couperin (the "first") and his second wife, Louise Bongard. She was goddaughter and cousin of François Couperin (1668-1733) (called "François the second" or "Couperin the Great") and he served as the royal harpsichordist of Louis XIV.

Marie-Anne was a cousin of the noted soprano and organist Marguerite-Louise Couperin (born about 1675), and Marie-Anne was aunt to the first woman to be appointed a royal court harpsichordist, Marguerite-Antoinette Couperin (1705 – c. 1778).

Marie-Anne became known as the organist and harpsichordist at Maubuisson Abbey (also called Notre-Dame-la-Royale). The ancient abbey, founded in 1236 by Blanche of Castile, is a Cistercian nunnery located at Saint-Ouen-l'Aumône, in the Val-d'Oise department of France.
