= Fernando De Luca =

Italian composer

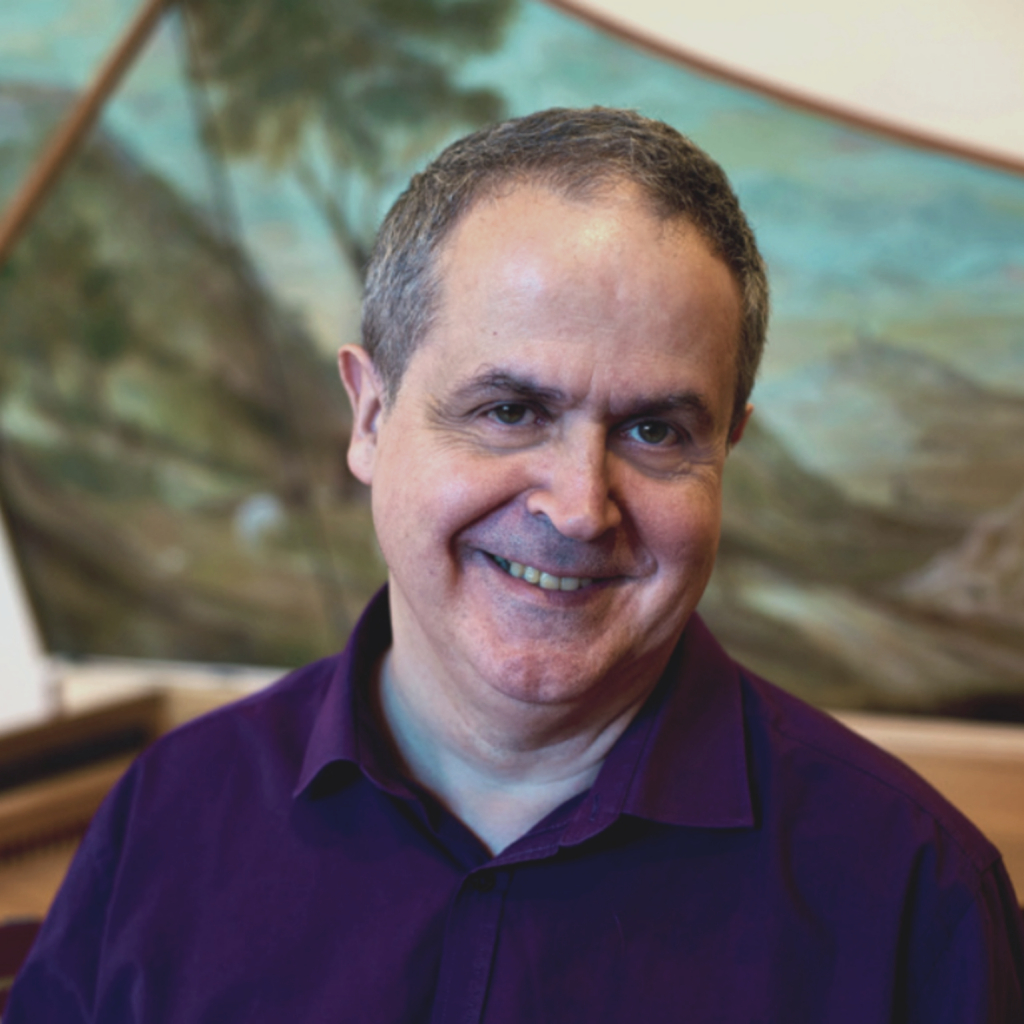
Fernando De Luca

Fernando De Luca (born 1961 in Rome) is an Italian harpsichordist, organist, teacher and composer.

== Biography ==
Fernando De Luca began his musical studies at a very young age, devoting himself first to the organ, then to the piano, obtaining his diploma in 1987 under the direction of Velia De Vita.

He also studied counterpoint and basso continuo with Mons.Domenico Bartolucci, Kapellmeister of the Sistine Chapel.

In 1992 he obtained his diploma in harpsichord at the Conservatory of Santa Cecilia in Rome under the direction of Paola Bernardi, with the best grades and honors.

The same year, on the recommendation of the Director, he received the Marcello Intendente prize from ARAM as the best diploma of the academic year.

He is interested in the problem of philological interpretation of the harpsichord repertoire of the 17th and 18th centuries, paying particular attention to the study and practice of historical tunings.

In 1994, he won first prize in the Gambi harpsichord competition of the Gioacchino Rossini Conservatory of Pesaro

From 1994 to 2003, both as a soloist and in chamber ensembles, he was invited by numerous Italian and foreign concert institutions such as the Gonfalone (Rome), the Lazio Regional Orchestra, Estate Fiesolana, Sagra musical umbra, Segni barocchi, Santa Cecilia, the Salento Baroque Festival, the Tagliacozzo Festival, the French Academy of the Villa Medici.

Since 1999, he has been a harpsichordist of the CIMA [archive] (Italian Center for Ancient Music), with whom he performs among others The Fairy Queen by Purcell, the Messiah by Handel, the Magnificat by Bach, various cantatas by Telemann, Funeral Anthem, Hercules and Handel's Judas Maccabaeus, under the direction of Maestro Sergio Siminovich.

In 2001 he was part of the National Committee, chaired by Prof.Mario Valente, for the celebrations of the third centenary of the birth of Metastasio. As a harpsichord teacher, he collaborates in the performance of two oratorios based on a text by Metastasio, the Passione di Gesù Cristo by Antonio Salieri and Giuseppe Riconosciuto by Pasquale Anfossi, performed in Rome in the Church of the Stigmata (recorded by Raisat and Radio Tre) and in Vienna in the Minoritenkirche and the Michaelerkirche.

He was also basso continuo of the Accademia Barocca di Santa Cecilia group for 10 years.

He performs in solo and ensemble concerts in Canada (2009), Germany and the United Kingdom (2021), Montenegro (2013) and Latvia (2014).

From 2004 to 2021, he held the chair of harpsichord at the Pierluigi da Palestrina Conservatory in Cagliari.

Since 2021 he has held the same chair at the Antonio Vivaldi Conservatory of Alessandria.

He is the author of numerous sonatas for harpsichord and flute, oboe, violin, viola da gamba, lute, as well as pieces of vocal music and chamber music.

In 1991, he was the first to play the Opera Omnia for harpsichord by J.N.P. Royer and founded in 2006 the "Sala del Cembalo del Caro Sassone", initially designed to achieve the online publication of the complete works for harpsichord by G.F. Handel, as well as rare French, German, English and Italian repertoires, like the complete works of R.Jones, T. Chilcot, T. Arne, Jean Baptiste Loeillet of Ghent, Pierre Février, François d'Agincourt, J. Sheeles and many others, which has now become the largest source of recordings made by a professional harpsichordist in the world. Next to the site, a Web Radio, "la Sala del Cembalo" is taking shape with the aim of broadcasting these recordings and the broadcasting of themes inherent to this musical period (podcast).

He published the 12 Suites of J.Mattheson for harpsichord only for the Harpsichord Association of Bologna.

To his credit various CDs recorded at Urania Records (N.Siret, G.F. Handel), at Brilliant Classics (complete works for keyboard by C. Graupner, complete music for harpsichord by C. Moyreau, complete music for harpsichord by C. A. Jollage).

And at Da Vinci Classics currently being published, the complete harpsichord music of George Frideric Handel.

== Discography ==
- Beauvarlet-Charpentier: 1er livre de Pièces de Clavecin (2024 Da Vinci Classics )
- George Friederic Handel: Complete Harpsichord Music Vol. 2 (2024 Da Vinci Classics)
- George Friederic Handel: Complete Harpsichord Music Vol. 1 (2024 Da Vinci Classics)
- Pierre-Claude Foucquet: Pièces de clavecin (2023 Brilliant Classics)
- Pierre Thomas Dufour: Pièces de Clavecin (2023 Brilliant Classics)
- Charles-Alexandre Jollage: Premier livre de Pièces de Clavecin (2023 Brilliant Classics)
- Cristophe Moyreau: Complete Harpsichord Music (2022 Brilliant Classics)
- Christoph Graupner: Complete Harpsichord Music (2021 Brilliant Classics)
- George Friederic Handel: Complete Preludes & Toccatas from the Bergamo Manuscript( 2018 Urania Records) with newly discovered music probably composed by George Frideric Handel and William Babell.
- Nicolas Siret: The Complete Harpsichord works ( 2017 Urania Records)

== Bibliography ==
- Pieces de clavecin: en deux volumes: monumento armonico in 12 suites / Johann Mattheson; a cura di Fernando De Luca. - Roma: Bardi, 1997 (stampa 1999). - XXI, 50 p; 34 cm. (Associazione clavicembalistica bolognese; 14). ((Ripr. facs. dell'ed.: London, printed for I. D. Fletcher and Sold at most musik shops, 1714. ISBN 88-85699-76-6
- 12 Sonate a Cembalo solo, 1997
- L'Arcadia in Gianicolo - "Sonata allegorico pastorale a più parti per Cembalo solo per l'arte la pratica e il diletto nel sonar il cembalo", 1997

== See also ==
- Musical historicism
- Harpsichord
