= Ordinaire =

Ordinaire may refer to:

- Ordinaire (wine bar), a wine bar in Oakland, California
- Ordinaire EP, an EP by Stepdad
- "Ordinaire", a 1970 song by Robert Charlebois, covered by Celine Dion in 2016 on Encore un soir
- "Ordinaire", a 2000 song by Self from Gizmodgery
- Ordinaire, a rank in the hierarchy of the court's musicians, held by Marguerite-Antoinette Couperin et al.

== See also ==
- Bourgogne Grand Ordinaire
- Temperament ordinaire (French tempérament ordinaire musical intonation)
- Vin ordinaire
