= List of French harpsichordists =

This article lists French composers who wrote for the harpsichord during the 17th and 18th centuries.

== Chronology ==
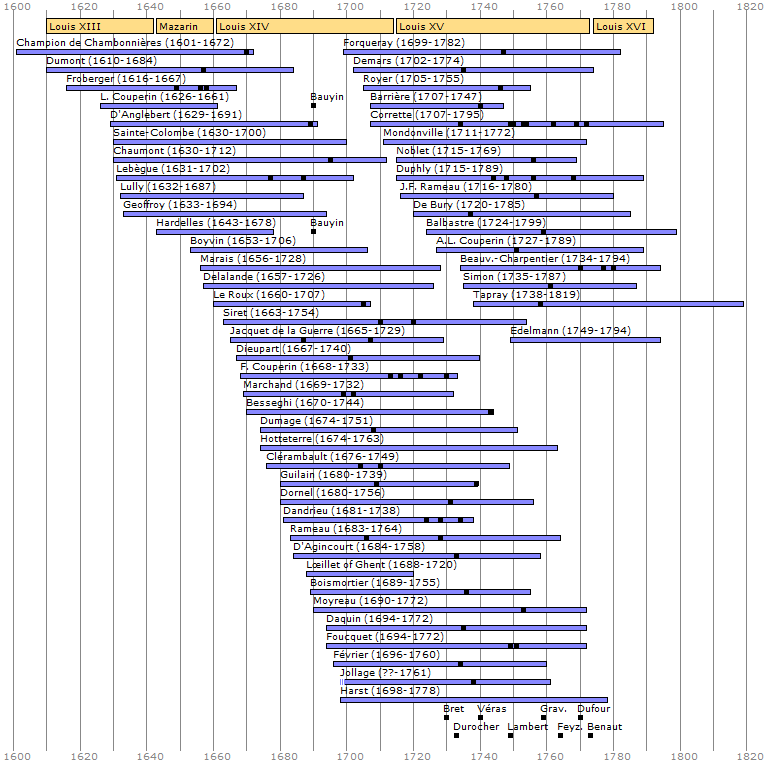

== 1640–1710: Beginnings of harpsichord music in France ==
- Jean-Henri d'Anglebert (1629–1691)
- Jacques Champion de Chambonnières (1601–1672)
- Louis Couperin (c.1626–1661)
- Louis-Nicolas Clérambault (1676–1749)
- Charles Dieupart (1667–1740)
- Jean-Nicolas Geoffroy (1633–1694)
- Élisabeth Jacquet de la Guerre (1665–1729)
- Nicolas Lebègue (1631–1702)
- Gaspard Le Roux (1660–1707)
- Louis Marchand (1669–1732)
- Nicolas Siret (1663–1754)

== 1710–1789: Second period ==
- Claude-Bénigne Balbastre (1724–1799)
- Joseph Bodin de Boismortier (1689–1755)
- François d'Agincourt (1684–1758)
- Jean-Odéo Demars (1695–1756)
- Josse Boutmy (1697–1779; Flemish)
- Bernard de Bury (1720–1785)
- Jean-Joseph Cassanéa de Mondonville (1711–1772)
- Michel Corrette (1707–1795)
- Armand-Louis Couperin (1727–1789)
- François Couperin (1668–1733)
- Jean-François Dandrieu (1681–1738)
- Louis-Claude Daquin (1694–1772)
- Louis-Antoine Dornel (1680–1756)
- Jacques Duphly (1715–1789)
- Pierre Février (1696–1760)
- Jean-Baptiste Forqueray (1699–1782)
- Pierre-Claude Foucquet (1694–1772)
- Jean-Adam Guilain (1680–1739; German)
- Célestin Harst (1698–1778)
- Christophe Moyreau (1690–1772)
- Jean-Philippe Rameau (1683–1764)
- Joseph Nicolas Pancrace Royer (1705–1755)
- Simon Simon (1720?–1788)
- Philippe-François Véras (fl. 1740)
