= Performance practice of Bach's music =

Johann Sebastian Bach's music has been performed by musicians of his own time (including himself), and in the second half of the eighteenth century by his sons and students, and by the next generations of musicians and composers such as the young Beethoven. Felix Mendelssohn renewed the attention for Bach's music by his performances in the 19th century. In the 20th century Bach's music was performed and recorded by artists specializing in the music of the composer, such as Albert Schweitzer, Helmut Walcha and Karl Richter. With the advent of the historically informed performance practice Bach's music was prominently featured by artists such as Nikolaus Harnoncourt, Gustav Leonhardt and Sigiswald Kuijken.

== In Bach's time ==
In Bach's time his music was experienced as exceptionally demanding for singers and instrumentalists, while he expected the same virtuosity of them as he could accomplish on organ and other keyboard instruments. That level of virtuosity was deemed "impossible", especially as he detailed how and with which ornamentation the music was to be executed.

=== Keyboard ===
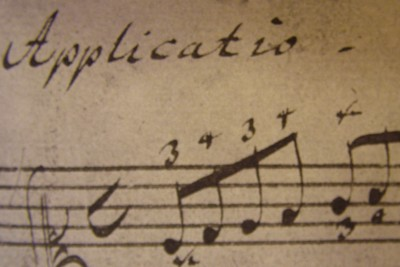
Bach indicating fingering in W. F. Bach's Klavierbüchlein

For his keyboard-playing Bach is largely considered an autodidact. In 1716 François Couperin's L'art de toucher le clavecin had appeared. Bach knew Couperin's harpsichord music: one of his pieces ended up in the Notebook for Anna Magdalena Bach. The Applicatio in C major BWV 994, the first piece in the Klavierbüchlein für Wilhelm Friedemann Bach, is one of a very few instances where Bach indicates fingering. Apart from such minute indications there are no direct descriptions by the composer of how he taught his students to play the keyboard. Generally, however, it is assumed that the indications in L'art de toucher le clavecin are not too far from how Bach played the harpsichord.

=== Organ ===
The earliest printed report about Johann Sebastian Bach qualifies him as a "famous organist". In 1737 Johann Adolf Scheibe gives a description of his organ-playing: "[Bach] is as astonishly accomplished. It is hard to understand how wonderful and agile he can manage his fingers and feet to come together and move apart again, making the widest jumps, without a single false note, and without, with such a violent movement, moving his body around."

=== Continuo ===
A document written in 1738 documents Bach's ideas about performance of the figured bass.

=== Choir and orchestra ===
From documents written by Bach in his Leipzig period it can be seen that the expected at least three (but preferably four) singers per voice group in a SATB choir. There were no separate vocal soloists: vocal solo parts were performed by choristers. An orchestra for performing his church music would consist of two to three first violins, and as many second violins, two times two viola players, two cellists, a violone, two to three oboists, one or two bassoons, three trumpets and timpani.

The composition of his orchestra varied widely depending on piece, for instance for the Passions there were no trumpets or timpani (while these festive instruments were deemed unsuitable for the time of Lent). Many of his pieces require flutes (traverso and/or recorder), and sometimes more exceptional instruments such as the lute.

Four-part chorales and motets were mostly performed with a colla parte instrumentation and/or continuo.

== Galant period ==
The first decades after the composer's death his music lived on mostly in keyboard music used for teaching by his students. By the time his son Carl Philipp Emanuel wrote his keyboard method the piano was replacing the harpsichord as standard keyboard instrument. Johann Christoph Altnickol, Johann Kirnberger, Johann Friedrich Agricola and Johann Peter Kellner performed Bach's music and taught it to the next generations.

Carl Philipp Emanuel and his older brother Wilhelm Friedemann performed their fathers church music in liturgical settings. Also performances in Leipzig under Kantor Doles appear to have been limited to such setting. Public concerts with Bach's music outside a liturgical setting were near to non-existent. Four-part chorales published in this period were stripped of their instrumentation and continuo parts, retaining only the four vocal lines.

== Classical period ==
By the time the composers of the classical period, such as Haydn, Mozart and Beethoven, encountered Bach's music performance practice had largely changed: keyboard music was performed on the piano, and what little of his vocal music that was still performed was limited to a cappella music. The figured bass was being replaced by written-out scores for all instruments. Bach's larger organ compositions were for the most part untraceable, and likewise his orchestral music and larger vocal compositions remained unperformed.

Performances of Bach's music were mostly limited to private salons such as those of Sarah Itzig Levy and Gottfried van Swieten, where for instance Beethoven played excerpts of the Well-Tempered Clavier. Mozart had arranged some of Bach's music for string trio and quartet. The Sing-Akademie zu Berlin, founded in 1791, included some of Bach's music in their public concerts.

== Romantic period ==
The transformations of the way Bach's music was performed that had taken place in the galant and classical periods were continued in the romantic period: piano instead of harpsichord, motets as a cappella music, etc. With the renewed interest in his larger vocal works and in his orchestral and organ music, also these pieces were adapted to 19th-century performance practices, and contemporary instrumentation.

Felix Mendelssohn performed Bach's music on the organ and conducted the first 19th-century performance of the St Matthew Passion: this 1829 performance set off the Bach Revival. Romantic composers featuring Bach's music in their public performances included Franz Liszt and Carl Tausig.

=== Arrangements ===
When the Bach Revival resulted in a higher demand for pieces by Bach to be performed in concerts, these were often presented in an arranged version. Organ music, for instance, could be performed in an orchestral arrangement, or as a bravura piano piece.

Score publications took into account that the music could be performed on the piano, and various piano arrangements were published, for instance in the Bach-Busoni Editions.

Bach himself rearranged many of his pieces to suit the performing situation. For example, the Prelude to his Partita for solo violin in E Major was transposed down to D Major with the solo violin part given to the organ, with oboes, trumpets, tympani, and strings added to provide the Sinfonia for his Cantata No.29. His Concerto for clavier and strings in F Minor was adapted with the treble line of the clavier arranged for solo violin. And, of course, Bach arranged many concertos by other composers (notably Vivaldi) for organ or harpsichord.

As the keyboard works are not specified for harpsichord, being written for the "clavier" (literally, "keyboard") any suitable keyboard instrument can be used to perform it and be historically legitimate.

=== Organ ===
The build of organs had considerably changed in the 19th century. In the late 19th century André Pirro published his book on Bach's organ music.

=== Continuo ===
In the Bach-Gesellschaft Ausgabe, published in the second half of the 19th century, the basso continuo was again rendered as a figured bass. Performance editions, such as those by Robert Franz, expanded the continuo in separate written out parts for multiple instruments. Philipp Spitta, siding with the Bach Ausgabe, disagreed with such overdone expansions of the continuo.

=== Vocal and instrumental forces ===
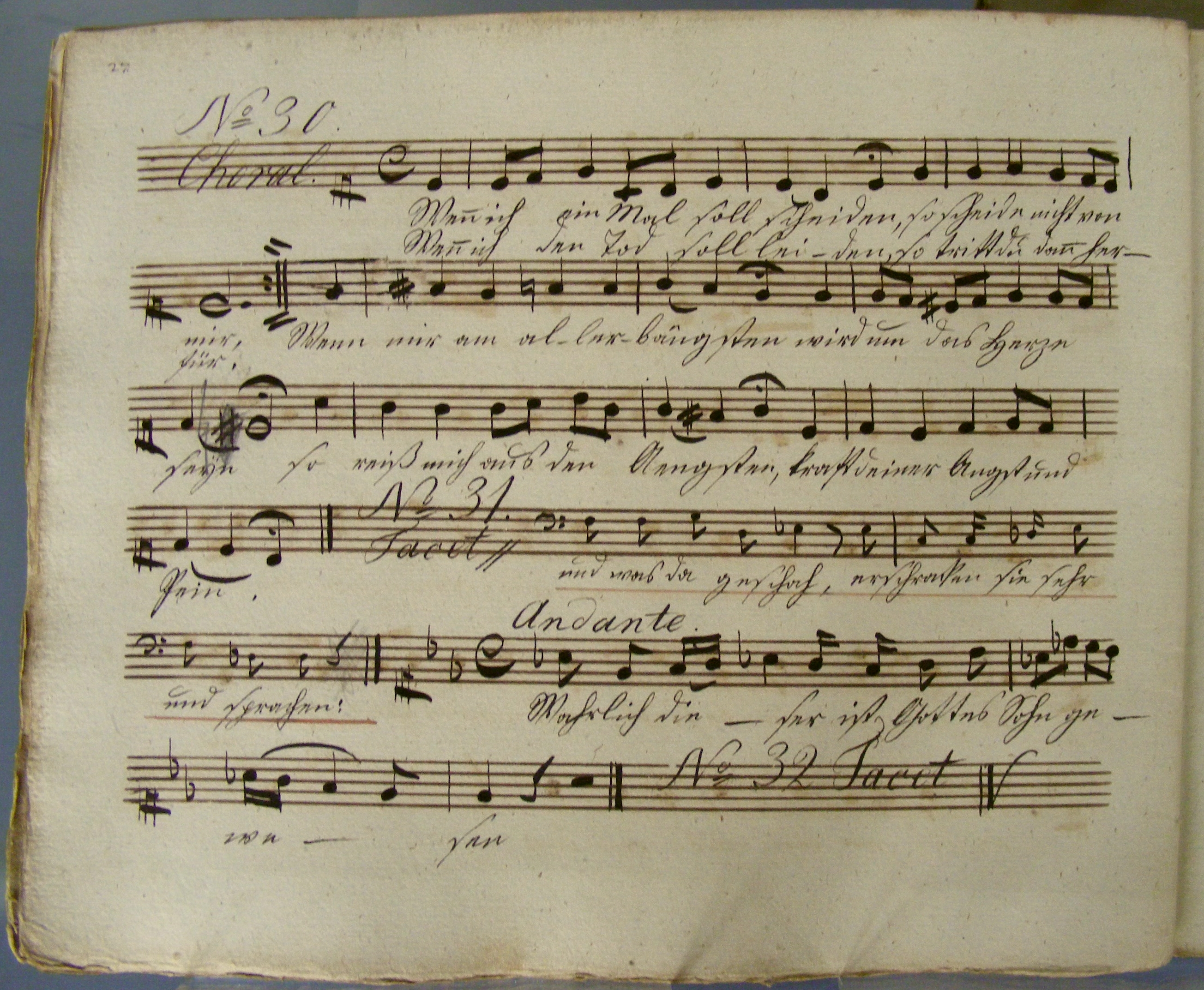
Mendelssohn's performance version of the St Matthew Passion

For his 1829 performance of the St Matthew Passion Felix Mendelssohn had produced a performance version of Bach's composition. By this time choirs had more than three or four singers per part, and solo parts were performed by vocal soloists separate from the choir. Also orchestras were larger than the 18 instrumentists Bach mentioned. Some instruments, such as the oboe d'amore, had largely fallen in disuse, or had a modified build compared to the instruments Bach used.

== Modern approaches ==
In the 20th century performances building on the late romantic performance practices for Bach's music remained standard for a long time, including performance of arrangements, but many more ways of performing and presenting Bach's music were added.

=== In other genres ===
Bach's music was often adopted in other genres, for instance in Jazz music, by musicians such as Jacques Loussier, Ian Anderson and Uri Caine and the Swingle Singers.

=== Organ ===
Harvey Grace described ways of performing Bach's organ music adapted to the possibilities of 20th-century instruments. Such instruments were for instance used by G. D. Cunningham, E. Power Biggs and Albert Schweitzer for their performances of Bach's organ music.

=== Symphonic arrangements ===
Edward Elgar, Leopold Stokowski and Eugene Ormandy adapted Bach's organ music to full modern symphonic orchestras.

=== Orchestra, soloists and voices ===
Orchestral and vocal forces used for performance of Bach's work remained indebted to the romantic tradition for the larger part of the 20th century.

=== Using modern and alternative instruments ===
New instruments were deployed for performing Bach's music, for instance performances on the Moog synthesiser by Wendy Carlos.

Virtually all of Bach's keyboard music, and much else besides, has been transcribed for one or two guitars. These are often performed on recordings using overdubbing techniques.

== Historically informed performance practice ==
When Nikolaus Harnoncourt started adopting the historically informed performance practice he prominently featured Bach's music, such as the Brandenburg Concertos and the cantatas. Performers following in that tradition, such as Gustav Leonhardt, Ton Koopman, Philippe Herreweghe and musicians of the Kuijken family invariably had a large part of their repertoire devoted to Bach.

=== Voices ===
Peter Kooy and Dorothee Mields became known for their soloist performances of Bach's vocal music such as his Passions.

=== Instruments ===
Wanda Landowska was the first to start performing Bach's keyboard music on harpsichord again. The instrument used by Landowska was however still far from the instruments used in Bach's day. Landowska had the piano manufacturer Pleyel create harpsichords for her to use in performing Bach. These instruments did not follow historical models, and have been derisively called "plucking pianos". These instruments are more commonly referred to as "revival" harpsichords, and still have their place in performance today, particularly with modern works expressly written for them.

After performing Bach's music on various organs, Marie-Claire Alain had an instrument built closer to the baroque instruments Bach played.

=== Ensembles ===
The size of the ensembles performing Bach's music became smaller again: for instance I Musici started performing baroque music, including Bach's with a smaller ensemble again.

=== Tempo ===
Performance tempo generally became more vivid than in the period dominated by the romantic approach to the performance of Bach's music. Today the tempos are much more relaxed, in keeping with Baroque performance practice.
