= Jacques Thomelin =

French composer and organist

Jacques Thomelin (French pronunciation: [ʒɑk tɔmlɛ̃]; c. 1635 – 28 October 1693), also named Jacques-Denis or Alexandre-Jacques-Denis, was a 17th-century French composer and organist.

== Family ==
Jacques Thomelin was born in Paris. His father, named Jacques, was master writer in Paris, a Paris bourgeois but of probably briard ancestry like the Couperin family. Until 1650 he lived in the Saint-Germain l'Auxerrois parish, rue de la vieille Harengerie, then moved to the rue des Postes in the Saint-Étienne-du-Mont parish. Married to Marie Balestel, he had four children; the second one was named Jacques-Denis and became an organist. His older brother was Guillaume; the other two were Martin and Marie.

Jacques-Denis married 10 November 1653 with Hélène Dumelin, daughter of a Parisian goldsmith, who brought him 2400 lt dowry. In 1655 he settled down with his wife in the rue du Fouarre, in the Saint-Germain-des-Prés parish. After 1669, he moved to rue de la Verrerie.

On 8 November 1684, Thomelin, as the executor of Pierre Méliton's will, organist of St. Jean Church, signed the inventory after the death of his deceased colleague (and probably friend).

Jacques-Denis Thomelin died on 28 October 1693, four days after writing his will and was buried in Saint-Jacques-la-Boucherie church. His post-death inventory is known: In addition to 3000 lt in cash, he left musical manuscripts that were donated to his widow (the latter moved to rue des Prouvaires with her eldest daughter).

Jacques-Denis (who at the end of his life also signed Alexandre, A. J. or A. J. D.) had two daughters. In 1683, cadet Éléonore married Nicolas Aunillon, Deputy Attorney General at the Grand Conseil. The elder, Marie-Madeleine, born before 1660, married François Collesson, businessman and clerk of Dupille, Receiver General for Finance of Lyon, by contract dated 18 March 1695. There were disputes between the young couple and Hélène Dumolin, who finally disinherited her daughter, and asked her for the music she would have taken with her. These music sheets never re-appeared.

Guillaume Thomelin, Jacques-Denis' elder brother, was an organist like his brother and a master writer like his father. He married in 1657 the daughter of Gabrielle Lhuissier, widow of Jacques Oudinot, daughter of a master of the Mantes and Meulan waters and forests, and endowed by his father with a pension of 300 lt.

== Career ==
The formation of Jacques-Denis Thomelin is not known. From 1653 onwards he was organist at the Église Saint-André-des-Arts (until June 1669) when the instrument went to Claude de Montalan and the Carmes de la place Maubert, a position he retained until his death and was occasionally replaced by his elder brother Guillaume.

In 1667, he became the first organ holder of this church's new organ, just completed by the sons of the builder Pierre Thierry, and kept this job until 1685, when he passed it on to his pupil Tassin.

In 1669, he obtained the organ of Saint-Jacques-la-Boucherie, due to the death of Étienne Richard. An agreement concluded with the churchwardens of this parish on 22 June 1669 specifies the terms and conditions of this employment: he received 400 lt of wages, of which 200 lt were withheld for the rent of a company residence on rue des Lombards, belonging to the factory. The chapter registers of this church provide the text of a reprimand of the chapter to the organist:

And like the length affected by Mr Thomelin, organist, in the playing of the organ during the service, wearies and tires both the clergy and the parishioners, who make continuous complaints about it that he was prayed various times but unnecessarily to cease it. We decided as well that said Thomelin will still be adverty <--!advised?--> to conform better to the ceremonial of the church of Paris which wants in no ambiguous terms that the organ play is ny (neither) long ny (nor) precipitated, if not that we will be forced to provide for it.

The 1670s inaugurated a period of fame for him, during which he was called upon several times to evaluate organs. In 1678, he became sufficiently well known to compete in the Chapelle Royale organist competition, organized to replace Joseph Chabanceau de La Barre who died, during which time this office was divided into four quarters. He won the contest and took the first quarter (the one running from January to March), Jean-Baptiste Buterne, Guillaume-Gabriel Nivers and Nicolas Lebègue taking the following three quarters. He gave lessons to the young François Couperin between 1679 and 1685 and it is assumed that he did the same with François de Lalande, brother of Michel-Richard de Lalande, who apparently attended him at Saint-Jacques. He was included in the jury of the famous competition of April 1683 for the positions of sub-masters of the Chapel of the King. In addition to his role as organist, he purchased an office as Ordinary Secretary to the King.

After his death, his pupil Couperin returned to his quarters in the Chapelle Royale.

The after-dinner he [the king] would have liked to hear seven different organists play to choose one instead of one of his own (who was called Thommelin), who praised the death; but, after hearing them, he would not declare his choice, which was known three days after he had fallen upon a man named Couperin. (Mémoires of Sourches, 27 December 1693).

At Saint-Jacques-la-Boucherie like the Carmes de la Place Maubert, it was his nephew Louis-Jacques Thomelin (son of Guillaume) whom Jacques-Denis designated to replace him, at the charge of financing some minor repairs for the organ of Saint-Jacques, for defects that Jacques-Denis should have - according to the chapter - repaired in his time.

== Works ==
For organ:

- Œuvres de Jacques Thomelin, éd. Nicolas Gorenstein. Paris : Chanvrelin, 2006 (CHAN 059), 22 p.

Includes: Pange lingua, 5 verses of the hymn Ave maris stella, trios, duets, stories, preludes. These works come from three musical manuscripts preserved at the Bibliothèque Sainte-Geneviève in Paris (Ms. 2348, 2353 and 2356). Nicolas Gorenstein, publisher of these works, presupposes that they are student notebooks written during the last quarter of the 17th century - they also contain pieces identified as being from Jacques Champion de Chambonnières, Louis Couperin and Étienne Richard). The attribution to Thomelin comes from the fact that certain pieces required a human voice playing on the pedal, and that at that time the organs of Saint-Jacques-la-Boucherie and Saint-André-des-Arts were among the rare French instruments that had them.

- A Tierce en taille in Tone V in Le manuscript Caumont orgue: private collection. Published by Lyrebird Press (Tynset, 2021).
- Several organ pieces contained in the Brussels manuscript BR : MS III 926. Published by Léon Kerremans in the supplément of L'organiste, 1966 (Bas-Oha : Union Wallonne des Organistes, 1966).

For harpsichord:

- Allemande de Mr Thomelin. Manuscript, Berkeley UL : Hargrove Music Library MS 1365 (Borel manuscript). See Moroney 2005.
- Allemande de M. Thomelin. Manuscript, early 18th century, 4 p. Paris BNF (Mus.) : VM7-1817 (BIS) (different from the previous one).

A collection of Thomelin's works may have been published by his son, according to a request for privilege: "The Sr Thomelin presented us with letters of privilege... for the printing of an organ book composed by the late Thomelin his father, for ten years, given in Paris on 6 February 1698". The collection is lost (if ever published).

== Bibliography ==
- Marcelle Benoit, Versailles et les Musiciens du Roi (1661-1733): étude institutionnelle et sociale. Paris: A. et J. Picard, 1971.
- Marcelle Benoit, Musiques de cour : Chapelle, Chambre, Ecurie (1661-1733): documents recueillis par M. Benoît. Paris : A. and J. Picard, 1971.
- Michel Brenet (pseud. for Marie Bobillier, La librairie musicale en France de 1653 à 1790, d’après les registres de privilèges. Sammelbände der Internationalen Musikgesellschaft 8 (1906–1907), (pp. 401–466). ISSN 1612-0124.
- Françoise Gaussen, Actes d’état civil de musiciens français : 1651-1681, Recherches sur la Musique Française Classique I (1960), (pp. 153–203).
- Pierre Hardouin, La famille de Jacques Denis Thomelin, Revue de musicologie 34 (1952), (pp. 129–131).
- Pierre Hardouin, Alexandre-Jacques-Denis Thomelin, Revue de musicologie 41 (1958), (pp. 95–99).
- Catherine Massip, La vie des musiciens de Paris au temps de Mazarin (1643–1661) : essai d'étude sociale. Paris : Picard, 1976.
- Davitt Moroney, "The Borel manuscript : a new source of seventeenth-century french harpsichord music at Berkeley", Notes, Second Series 62/1 (2005),(pp. 18–47).
- La musique à la cour de Louis XIV et Louis XV, d’après les Mémoires de Sourches et Luynes (1698-1757). Excerpts collected by Norbert Dufourcq. Paris: Picard, 1970.

== Discography ==
- Cinq siècles de musique d'orgue à Saint Bertrand-de-Comminges, Élisabeth Amalric, orgue. 1 CD Artephonix, 2009 (collection Pyrénéorgues; 02). Includes the Ave maris stella attributed to Thomelin.
