= Pierre-Louis Couperin =

French composer & organist (1755–1789)

- Born: 14 March 1755
- Died: 10 October 1789 (aged 34)
- Occupation: Classical organist

Pierre-Louis Couperin (14 March 1755 – 10 October 1789) was a French organist and composer, a member of the famous Couperin dynasty of composer-organists.

== Life ==
Like his brother Gervais-François, Pierre-Louis Couperin studied with his father Armand-Louis Couperin. On 19 April 1773, the board of Saint-Gervais-Saint-Protais appointed him as successor to his father. Pierre-Louis Couperin occupied the traditional positions held by his family: he was an organist at Notre-Dame de Paris, where his brother succeeded him, but also at Saint-Gervais, Saint-Jean-en-Grève, the Carmes-Billettes and the Chapelle royale.

Pierre-Louis Couperin died shortly after his father and was buried with him in the Saint-Gervais church in the chapel de la Providence.

== Compositions ==
- Romances for harpsichord
- 1782: Air de Malbrough mis en variations
- 1784: Allegro
- 1784: Air de Tibulle et d'Élie
- 1787: Romance de Nina mise en variations pour le clavecin, ou piano-forte

== Bibliography ==
- Anthony, James R. (1997), French Baroque Music from Beaujoyeulx to Rameau, Portland, Amadeus Press
- Beausant, Philippe (1980), François Couperin, Paris, Fayard
- Benoit, Marcelle (rep.) (1992), Dictionnaire de la musique en France aux XVII et XVIIIe siècles, Paris, Fayard

== See also ==
- Couperin family

Preceded by Jean-Jacques Beauvarlet-Charpentier	Organist of Notre Dame de Paris; 1789	Succeeded by Gervais-François Couperin
