= Philippe-François Véras =

Philippe-François Véras, (1690 ? – 1742), was a French composer, organist and harpsichordist active in Lille about 1740.

Veras was organist at the Saint-Maurice church in Lille, and published a small collection of harpsichord works in Paris, in 1740 according to the legal document Privilège Général. A small amount of biographical information can be gleaned from this 1740 publication, as it plainly states he was employed there. As was typical of harpsichord works of this period, the pieces are organized in "Ordres" (a free-form suite of compositions containing descriptive, picturesque titles) in a manner similar to François Couperin before him.

The majority of the works are in two parts.

The music of Véras suggests he was influenced by Italian styles: the melodic contours and harmonic language of his works show a substantial stylistic affinity with the sonatas of Domenico Scarlatti. The third movement of his first "ordre" is entitled "La Volliante, dans le goût italien" ("La Volliante, in the Italian taste/manner").

Fuller, in the composer's Grove Music Online entry, criticises his work as lacking "real imagination or variety".

A facsimile edition of these works was published in 1982 by Minkoff (Genève), ISBN 2-8266-0792-8.

== Harpsichord works ==
Pièces de Clavecin - Premier Livre (1740)

- Premier ordre in G/g
  - Badines 1 & 2
  - Les Brunes - Les Brunais
  - La Volliante dans le goût italien
  - Les Bergères 1e & 2e parties
  - Tambourins 1 & 2
  - 1er Menuet (Tambourin 3)
  - 2e Menuet (Tambourin 4)
- Deuxième ordre in C/c
  - La Divertissante
  - Le Cocquelet
  - La Duchesse
  - La Galante
  - Sarabande
  - Tambourins 1 & 2
- Troisième ordre in a/A
  - Le Rédiculle
  - La Fidèle
  - La Légère
  - Tambourins 1 & 2
  - La Belle
  - Les Sauvages: Menuets 1 & 2
- Quatrième Ordre in D/d
  - La Riante, rondeau
  - La Milordine
  - Rigaudons 1 & 2
  - La Belle Idée, rondeau
  - La Ginguette

== Scores ==
- Free scores by Philippe-François Véras at the International Music Score Library Project (IMSLP)

== See also ==
- List of French harpsichordists
