= Gervais-François Couperin =

French composer (1759–1826)

Gervais-François Couperin (22 May 1759 – 11 March 1826) was a representative of the famous Couperin family of composers and organists.

== Biography ==
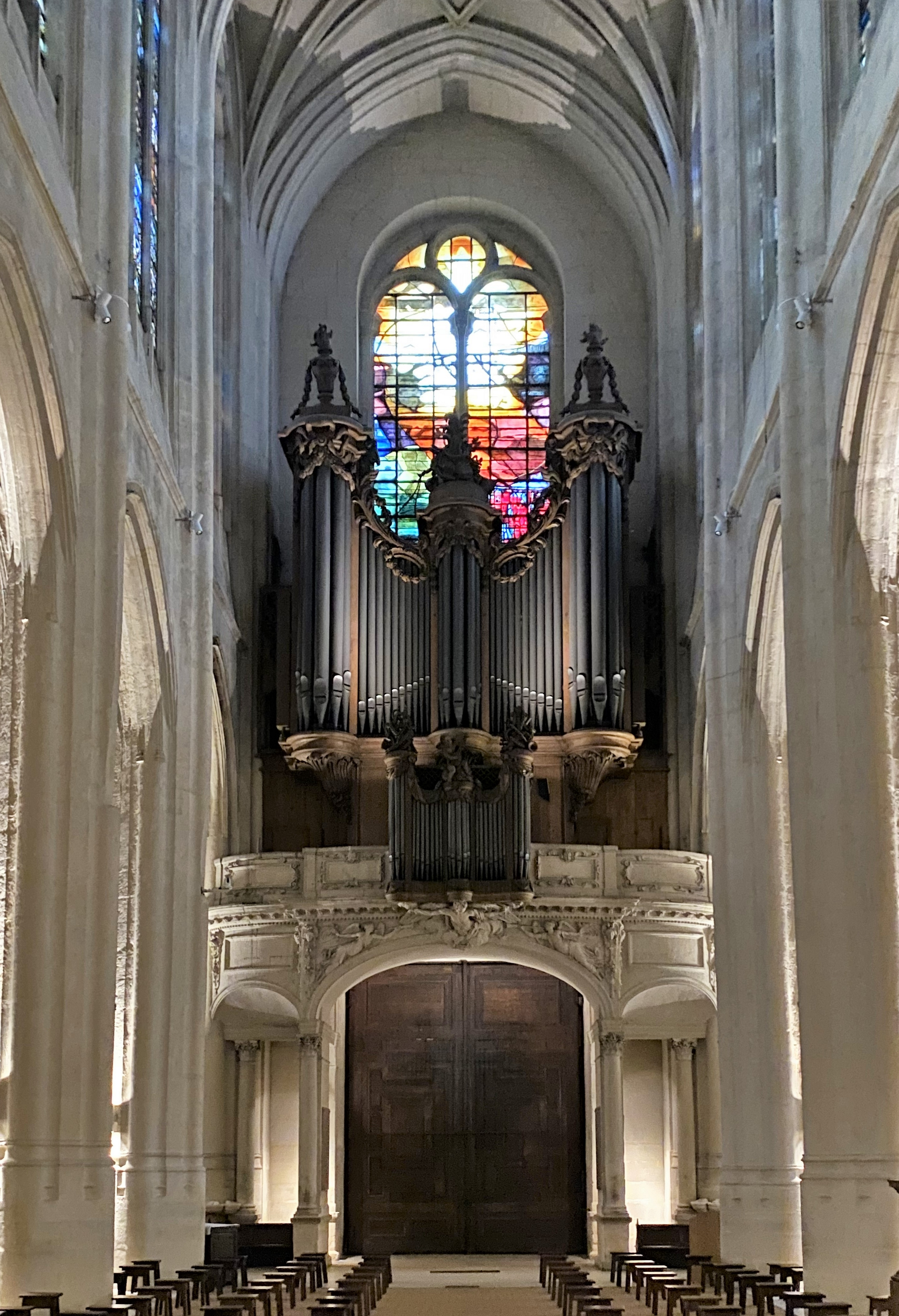
Main Organ at the Paris Saint Gervais - Saint Protais church where the Couperin family played.

He studied with his father Armand-Louis Couperin. In 1789, Gervais-François replaced his father at the Sainte-Chapelle organ. Gervais-François succeeded his brother Pierre-Louis Couperin at Notre-Dame de Paris, a position he held until the Revolution. He was later an organist at St-Gervais-et-St-Protais and Saint-Merri (1818–1826).

He married Hélène Thérèse Frey, a singer, with whom he had a daughter, Céleste Thérèse (1793–1860), who succeeded him briefly as the organist at St-Gervais-et-St-Protais. She became the last member of the Couperin musical dynasty.

Gervais-François Couperin died in Paris on 11 March 1826 at the age of 66.

== Works ==
- 1782: Rondo in D major for harpsichord or pianoforte
- 1788: Deux Sonates Op. 1 for harpsichord or pianoforte with violin and violoncello ad libitum
- 1790: Ah ! Ça ira !, variations for harpsichord
- 1797: Ouvertures d'Iphigénie et de Démophon for the pianoforte and violin ad libitum
- 1797: Les Incroyables et Les Merveilleuses for pianoforte
- 1799: Premier Recueil contenant six Romances, avec accompagnement de piano-forte ou harpe
- 1816: Louis XVIII ou le Retour du bonheur en France.

== See also ==
- Couperin family

== Bibliography ==
- Anthony, James R. (1997), French Baroque Music from Beaujoyeulx to Rameau, Portland, Amadeus Press
- Beaussant, Philippe (1980), François Couperin, Paris, Fayard
- Benoit, Marcelle (rep.) (1992), Dictionnaire de la musique en France aux XVII et XVIIIe siècles, Paris, Fayard, ISBN 2-213-02824-9

Preceded by Pierre-Louis Couperin	Organist at Notre Dame de Paris; 1789–1793	Succeeded by Antoine Desprez
