= Claude Balbastre =

French composer

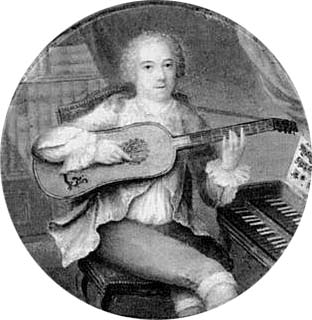
- Claude Balbastre. Miniature on ivory. Musée de Dijon.
- Born: 8 December 1724; Dijon, France
- Died: 9 May 1799 (aged 74); Paris, France
- Occupation: French composer
- Spouse: Marie-Geneviève Hotteterre (m. 1763)
- Family: Jacques-Martin Hotteterre (father in-law)

Claude Balbastre (8 December 1724 – 9 May 1799) was a French composer, organist, harpsichordist and fortepianist. He was one of the most famous musicians of his time.

== Life ==
Claude Balbastre was born in Dijon in 1724. Although his exact birthdate has been disputed, the discovery of his baptismal record has now made that date, 8 December, certain.

Balbastre's father, Bénigne, a church organist in Dijon, had 18 children from two marriages; Claude was the 16th. Three of his brothers were also named Claude. He is often confused with younger brother Claude-Bénigne Balbastre (22 Jan. 1727-before 22 March 1737). He received his first music lessons from his father, then became a pupil of Claude Rameau, the younger brother of Jean-Philippe Rameau, the most famous French musician at the time and also a native of Dijon.

Balbastre settled in Paris in 1750 and studied there with Pierre Février, whom he succeeded as organist of the Saint Roch church. Jean-Philippe Rameau helped and protected Balbastre when he settled in the city, so Balbastre was quickly and efficiently introduced to the Parisian musical circles and high society, and made a brilliant career: he played at the Concert Spirituel until 1782, became organist of the Notre-Dame cathedral and of the Chapelle Royale, became harpsichordist to the French royal court where he taught queen Marie-Antoinette, and became organist for Louis-Stanislas-Xavier, Count of Provence, who later became Louis XVIII, King of France. Balbastre's fame was so great that the Archbishop of Paris, Christophe de Beaumont had to forbid him to play at Saint Roch during some of the services, because the churches were always crowded when Balbastre played.

An account of one of these services at Saint Roch is provided by Dr. Charles Burney who recounts that, on Sunday 17 June 1770, he left a dinner early in order to hear the "celebrated" Balbastre play the organ at Saint Roch. Balbastre "performed in all styles in accompanying the choir. When the Magnificat was sung, he played likewise between each verse several minuets, fugues, imitations, and every species of music, even to hunting pieces and jigs, without surprising or offending the congregation, as far as I was able to discover."

Burney visited Balbastre at home and reported that the latter owned a very beautiful harpsichord by Ruckers: "After church M. Balbastre invited me to his house, to see a fine Rucker harpsichord which he has had painted inside and out with as much delicacy as the finest coach or even snuff-box I ever saw at Paris." He also reported that he owned a "very large organ, with pedals, which it may be necessary for a French organist to have for practice; it is too large and coarse for a chamber, and the keys are as noisy as those at St. Roque (sic)." Burney reports that Balbastre was on very good terms with his fellow composer Armand-Louis Couperin, to whom he introduced Burney, remarking "I was glad to see two eminent men of the same profession, so candid and friendly together."

In 1763, he married Marie-Geneviève Hotteterre, daughter of Jacques Martin Hotteterre and descendant of the famous family of Norman musicians. During the French Revolution, Balbastre's connection with nobility and the royal court might have endangered his life, but he adapted to the new political situation, playing the Revolutionary hymns and songs on his organ. He did lose his official posts and, temporarily, his pension. He died in Paris in 1799.

== Works ==
Balbastre's best-known compositions include the following:

- 14 organ concertos (all lost but one)
- quartet sonatas
- two collections of harpsichord pieces (from 1748 and 1759)
- four noëls variés suites for the organ or fortepiano (1770).
- variations on La Marseillaise: Marche des Marseillois et l’Air Ça-ira Arrangés pour le Forte Piano / Par le Citoyen C. Balbastre / Aux braves défenseurs de la République française l’an 1792 1er de la République

== See also ==
- List of French harpsichordists
- French organ school
