= Célestin Harst =

French priest, organist and harpsichordist (1698-1778)

Célestin Harst (1698–1778) was a French Catholic priest, organist and harpsichordist.

He was born in Sélestat (German: Schlettstadt), Alsace, and became prior of the Ebersmunster abbey in 1745. He also was the penultimate provost of the Saint-Marc convent near Gueberschwihr. At some point in life, he was introduced to the French royal court and played for Louis XV.

Harst published some organ pieces and, in 1745, the Recueil de différentes pièces de clavecin. Premier livre, a collection of harpsichord works. His style was influenced by Couperin, Rameau and Scarlatti.

== See also ==
- French baroque harpsichordists
