= Guillaume-Gabriel Nivers =

French organist, composer and theorist

- Born: c. 1632; Paris, France
- Died: 13 November 1714 (aged 81–82) Paris, France
- Genres: Classical
- Occupation(s): Organist, composer, music theorist
- Instrument: Pipe organ
- Years active: 1650s–1714

Guillaume-Gabriel Nivers (c. 1632, Paris – 13 November 1714) was a French organist, composer and theorist. His first livre d'orgue is the earliest surviving published collection with traditional French organ school forms (a collection by Louis Couperin that is in manuscript does not seem to have been published. See Guy Oldham, "Louis Couperin: A New Source of French Keyboard Music of the Mid-17th Century", Recherches sur la musique française classique, Vol. I (1960), pp. 51–59). Nivers's other music is less known; however, his treatises on Gregorian chant and basso continuo are still considered important sources on 17th century liturgical music and performance practice.

== Life ==
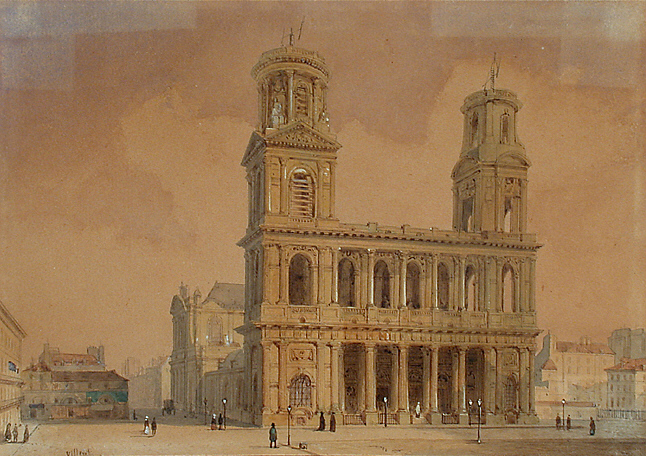
Church of Saint Sulpice in Paris, where Nivers worked from the 1650s until his death. This west façade, however, was built only in 1732, after the composer's death. Watercolor by François-Étienne Villeret, first half of the 19th century.

Nivers was born into a prosperous Parisian family: his father was a fermier générale (tax collector) for the bishop. Little is known of his early years or his musical training; only that he may have received a degree from the University of Paris. In the early 1650s, Nivers became organist of Saint-Sulpice, a post he retained until 1702. In 1668 the composer married; he had one son.

Nivers's subsequent career was illustrious. On 19 June 1678 he was appointed one of the four organists of the Chapelle Royale—an ensemble who performed sacred music for Louis XIV, the others being Nicolas Lebègue, Jacques Thomelin and Jean-Baptiste Buterne. Nivers resigned late in life, in 1708, and was succeeded by Louis Marchand. This prestigious appointment was followed by another in 1681, when he succeeded Henri Dumont as master of music to the queen, Maria Theresa of Spain. Finally, in 1686 Nivers was in charge of the music at the Maison Royale de Saint-Louis in Saint-Cyr-l'École—a convent school for young ladies who were poor but of noble birth. Nivers apparently had difficulties with the founder of the school, Madame de Maintenon, but retained the post until his death. His colleagues at St Cyr were Jean-Baptiste Moreau, who had worked there since the school's inception, and possibly Louis-Nicolas Clérambault, who may have helped Nivers from about 1710 until the latter's death in 1714. Clérambault succeeded Nivers both at St Sulpice and St Cyr.

During his lifetime, Nivers was highly regarded not only as organist and composer but also as a music theorist. His treatise on composition (Traité de la composition de musique, 1667) was well known outside France and endured into the 18th century. His work in the field of Gregorian chant resulted in influential editions of liturgical music (including an edition of Missa cunctipotens genitor Deus, which most French organ composers used as a model for their mass settings) and helped the Catholic Counter-Reformation.

== Work ==
Nivers composed several religious vocal works, and published three organ books (1665, 1667, 1675) containing more than 200 pieces. They include suites in all ancient (ecclesiastical) modes, a mass, hymns, and settings of the Deo Gratias and Te Deum. These books are the first collections of organ music to have been printed in France since Jean Titelouze's. With his colleague and friend Lebègue, Nivers embodies the solo organ style which was subsequently represented - and adorned - by François Couperin and the short-lived Nicolas de Grigny. Several theoretical treatises by Nivers are preserved. They remain useful sources for knowledge of both musical theory and practice of his time.

== List of works ==
This is a partial list of surviving works by Nivers. See William Pruitt, "Bibliographie des Oeuvres de Guillaume Gabriel Nivers", Recherches sur la musique française classique, Vol. XIII (1973), pp. 133–156. Notes on other publications located after that article was published are in papers deposited in Cambridge University Library (U.K.). All of the published works were published in Paris; many were reprinted several times during the 17th and the 18th centuries, however, here only dates of first editions are given.

=== Instrumental ===
- Livre d'orgue contenant cent pièces de tous les tons de l'église (1665)
- 2e livre d'orgue contenant la messe et les hymnes de l'église (1667)
- 3e livre d'orgue des huit tons de l'église (1675)
- 3 dances for lute (spurious)

=== Vocal ===
- Motets а voix seule [...] et quelques autres motets а deux voix propres pour les religieuses (1689)
- Miscellaneous works for the convent school at St Cyr:
  - Cantique sur la conformité а la volonté de Dieu
  - Chants de Jephté
  - Le Temple de la paix
  - Opéra de la vertu
  - Opéra de sceaux

==== Liturgical editions ====
- Graduale romano-monasticum [...] in usum et gratiam monialium sub regula S.P.N. Benedicti, Augustini, Francisci militantium (1658)
- Chants des offices propres du séminaire de St-Sulpice (1668)
- Antiphonarium romanum [...] in usum et gratiam monialium sub regula S.P.N. Benedicti militantium (1671)
- Graduale romanum [...] in usum et gratiam monialium sub regula S.P.N. Augustini militantium (1687)
- Graduale monasticum [...] in usum et gratiam monialium sub regula S.P.N. Benedicti militantium (1687)
- Antiphonarium Praemonstratense (1680)
- Graduale Praemonstratense (1680)
- Passiones Domini N.J.C. cum lamentationibus Jeremiae prophetae, et formulis cantus ordinarii officii divini (1683)
- Offices divins а l'usage des dames et demoiselles établies par sa majesté à Saint-Cyr (1686)
- Antiphonarium monasticum ad usum sacri ordinis Cluniacensis (1693)
- Graduale romanum juxta missale sacro-sancti Concilii Tridentini (1697)
- Antiphonarium romanum juxta breviarium sacro-sancti Concilii Tridentini (1701)
- Les lamentations du prophète Jérémie (1704)
- Le processionel avec les saluts suivant l'antiphonaire des religieuses (1706)
- Chants d'église à l'usage de la paroisse de St-Sulpice (1707)
- Processionale romanum juxta breviarium sacro-sancti Concilii Tridentini (1723)
- Chants et motets à l'usage de l'église et communauté des Dames de la royale maison de St-Louis à St-Cyr (1733, includes motets by Louis-Nicolas Clérambault)

=== Writings ===
- Observations sur le toucher et jeu de l'orgue (1665, included in Livre d'orgue contenant cent pièces)
- Méthode facile pour apprendre à chanter la musique (1666, also attributed to Charles le Maire)
- Traité de la composition de musique (1667)
- Dissertation sur le chant grégorien (1683)
- L'art d'accompagner sur la basse continue (1689, included in Motets а voix seule)
- Méthode certaine pour apprendre le plain-chant de l'Église (1698)

Preceded by Vincent Coppeau	Titular Organist, Saint Sulpice Paris; 1640–1714	Succeeded by Louis-Nicolas Clérambault

== Free scores ==
- e-Partitions Many newly edited and typeset organ scores.
- Suite No. 2 from 3e Livre d'orgue: sheet music
- Petits motets from the Royal Convent School at St.-Cyr at A-R Editions, includes a sample of Nivers' vocal work
- Free scores by Guillaume-Gabriel Nivers at the International Music Score Library Project (IMSLP)
