= Céleste-Thérèse Couperin =

French organist (1792–1860)

Céleste-Thérèse Couperin (1792 or 1793 — 14 February 1860) was a French musician, primarily remembered as the last member of the famous Couperin family of composers and organists.

== Biography ==
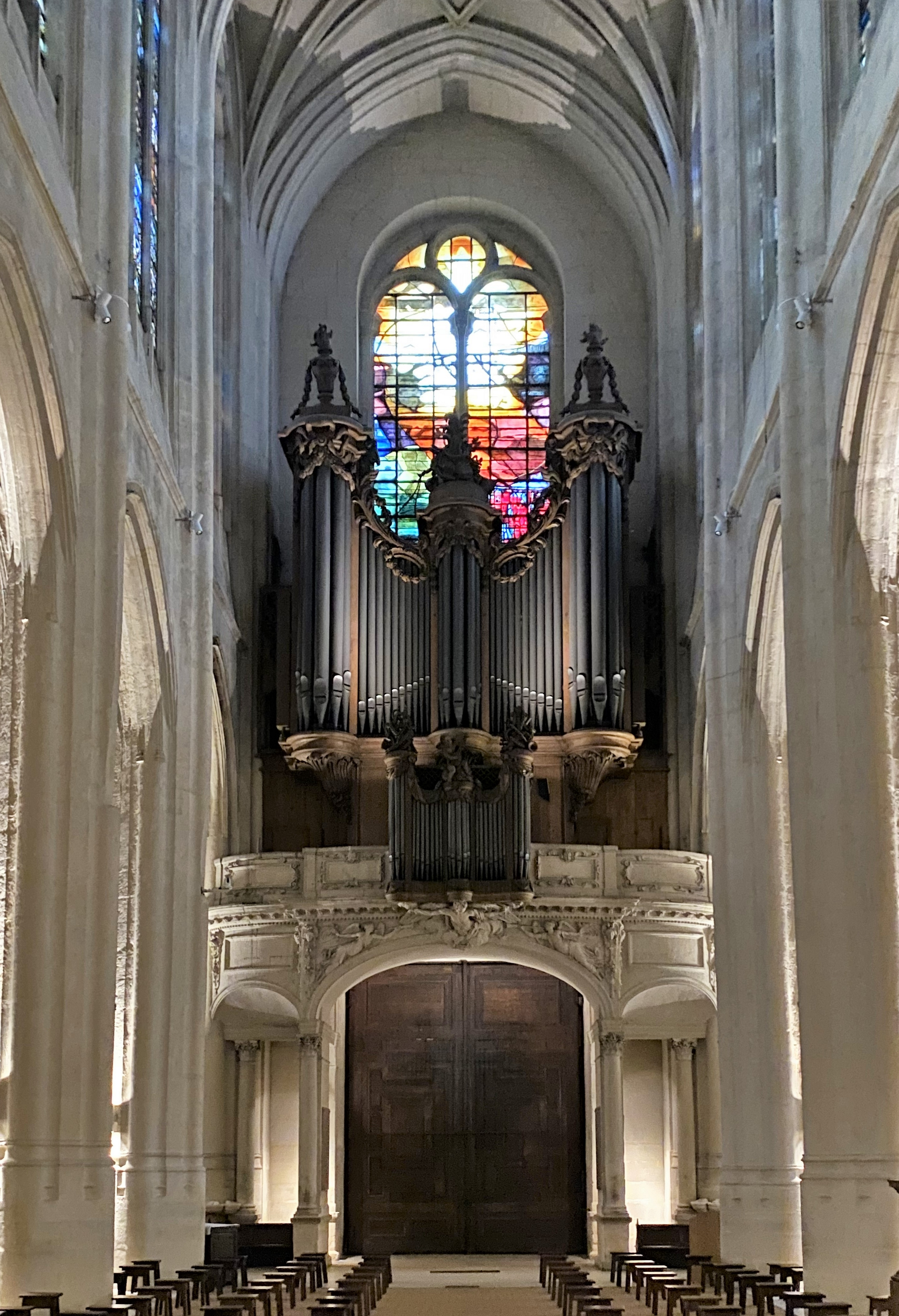
Main Organ at the Saint Gervais - Saint Protais church in Paris where the Couperin family played.

Born in Paris, she was the only daughter of Gervais-François Couperin and his wife Hélène Thérèse Frey (1775–1862). Following the family's centuries-old tradition, Céleste-Thérèse became an organist, pianist and singer.

When her father died in 1826, she replaced him for a few months in the organ loft of the Saint-Gervais church, a musical assignment that had been held by members of her family for more than 170 years. She was the first woman to hold this position. The position was put to the congregation: "On 7 April 1826 - the assembly took up the nomination of an organist, the position being vacant due to the death of M. Couperin. The assembly, in recognition of the long service of this esteemed and justly mourned artist, has nominated as his successor his daughter, Mlle. Couperin, organist of the parish of Saint-Jean-Saint-François.”

After a short time, another organist, Jean-Nicolas Marrigues, was appointed. Céleste-Thérèse was then the organist of Saint-François for four years.

In 1830, to save money, the mother and daughter left Paris for Beauvais hoping to teach music there.

By 1843, they had moved to Belleville (now part of Paris), living in great destitution because by July 1847, Céleste-Thérèse no longer had music students and it was noted officially that she had "no profession." When the mother and daughter needed money and sold two Couperin family portraits in 1848, they received 500 francs for the pair.

Céleste-Thérèse Couperin died – two years before her mother – on 14 February 1860 at the age of 67 in her home in Belleville. Her death certificate states that she was unemployed at the time. When she died the Couperin musical dynasty died out.

== Testament ==
Pierre-Paul Lacas, musicologist and president of the Association Française pour la Sauvegarde de l'Orgue ancien (French Association for the Preservation of Historic Organs), wrote about Céleste-Thérèse Couperin:

"We know that she preserved the organ traditions of the 18th century. She was one of the rare titular organists in Parisian galleries who was able to improvise an organ fugue."

– Pierre-Paul Lacas
