= Pierre-Claude Foucquet =

French organist and harpsichordist

Pierre-Claude Foucquet (French: [pjɛʁ klod fukɛ]; 1694 – February 13, 1772) was a French organist and harpsichordist.

Foucquet was born in Paris, the son of Pierre Foucquet and Anna-Barbe Domballe. He was born into a family of musicians. At age 18, he was appointed as the organist at Saint Honoré church in Paris. Following this appointment he was the organist in several important churches: the Royal Abbey of St Victor (destroyed during the French Revolution), the St Eustache church, the Chapel Royal where he succeeded François d'Agincourt (1758), and the Notre-Dame Cathedral. At the end of his life he had to resign his appointment as organist due to illness, but was given a pension by the King.

His output includes: Three harpsichord books (before 1751)

- Pièces de clavecin – Oeuvre première - Les Caractères de la Paix in C:
  - La Renommée
  - Marche en rondeau
  - Fanfare
  - Le Feu
  - Les Grâces pour musette
  - 2ème Musette
  - Les Ris: rondeau
  - Tambourin
  - Les Jeux: rondeau
- Second Livre de Pièces de clavecin
- Les Forgerons, le Concert des faunes et autres pièces de clavecin. Troisième Livre
- Several arias for two parts and continuo (La belle Silvie etc.)

== See also ==
- French baroque harpsichordists
