= Marguerite-Louise Couperin =

French singer and harpsichordist

Marguerite-Louise Couperin (1675/76 or 1678/79 in Paris – 1728 in Versailles) was a French soprano singer and harpsichordist, who came from the musically talented Couperin family dynasty. The Frenchman Évrard Titon du Tillet, in his 1732 book Le Parnasse françois, describes her as "one of the most celebrated musicians of our time, who sang with admirable taste and who played the harpsichord perfectly."

Her music teacher was Jean-Baptiste Moreau (1656–1733).

She was the cousin of the composer François Couperin (The Great) and collaborated with him in performing soprano parts to his church vocal music compositions. The soprano parts written for her are exceptionally high and need great purity of tone.

The Chapelle royale did not ordinarily permit women to take part in performances, instead using falsetti and castrati male artists. Such was her talent that an exception was made in her case, and also for the two daughters of Michel Richard Delalande, Marie-Anne and Jeanne.

== See also ==
- Marguerite-Antoinette Couperin (1705–1778) a younger cousin and also a talented harpsichordist.
