= Jean-François Dandrieu =

French composer, harpsichordist and organist (c. 1682-1738)

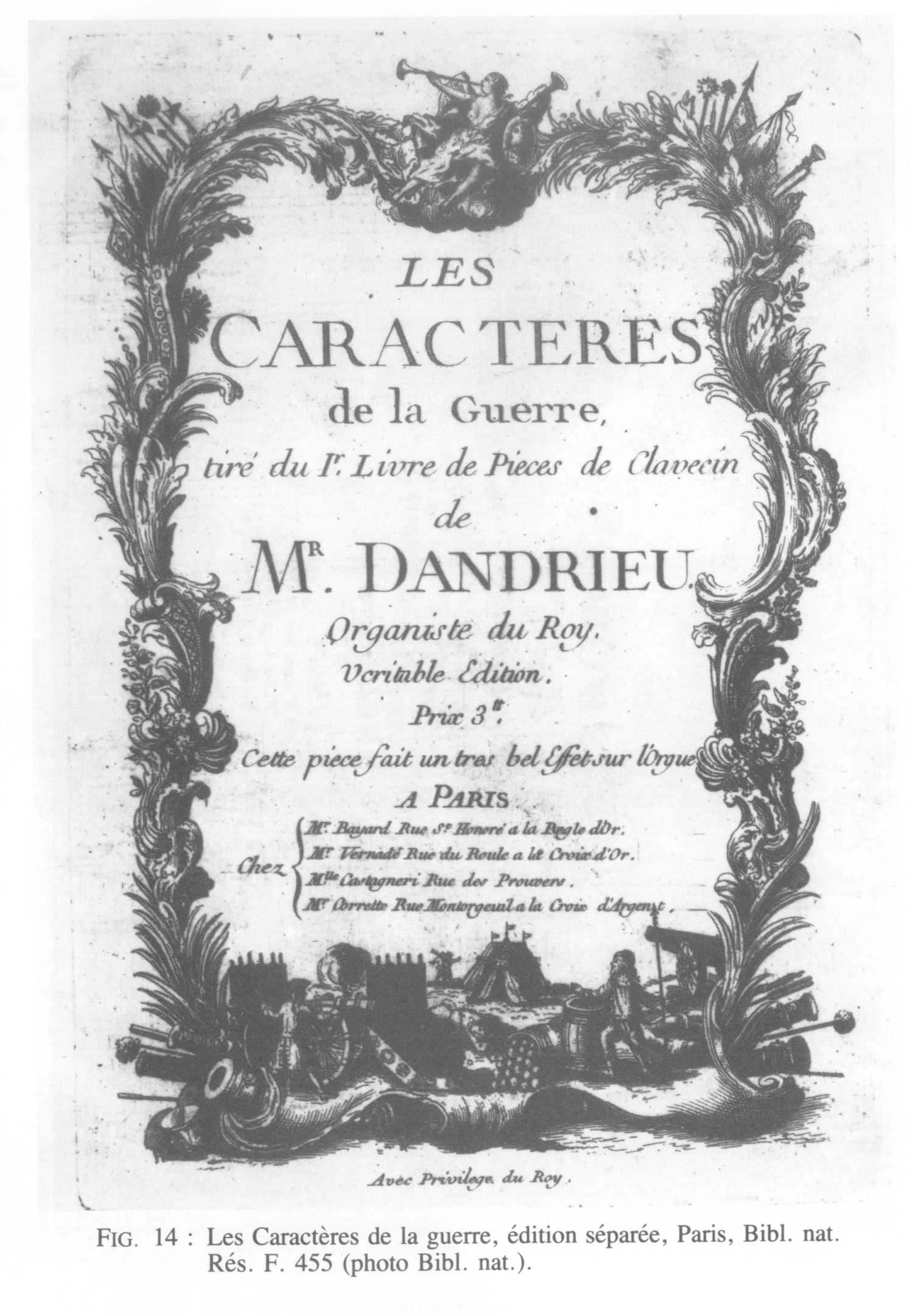
Jean François Dandrieu: Les caractères de la guerre

Jean-François Dandrieu, also spelled D'Andrieu (c. 1682 – 17 January 1738) was a French Baroque composer, harpsichordist and organist.

== Biography ==
Dandrieu was born in Paris into a family of artists and musicians. A gifted and precocious child, he gave his first public performances when he was 5 years old, playing the harpsichord for King Louis XIV, and his court. These concerts marked the beginning of Dandrieu's very successful career as harpsichordist and organist. He was a student of Jean-Baptiste Moreau. In 1700, aged 18, he started playing the organ at the Saint-Merri church in Paris (a post previously occupied by Nicolas Lebègue) and became its titular organist in 1705. At some point in 1706 he was a member of the panel of judges who examined Jean-Philippe Rameau's skills to appoint him organist of the Sainte-Madeleine en la Cité church (incidentally, a post Rameau declined). In 1721 he was appointed one of the four organists of the Chapelle royale of France. In 1733, he succeeded his uncle, the organist and priest Pierre Dandrieu (1664–1733) to become the organist of the (now destroyed) church of St Barthélémy in the Île de la Cité, a post he combined with duties at Saint-Merri (also known as Saint-Médéric). He died in Paris in 1738, and was succeeded at the organ of St Barthélemy by his sister, Jeanne-Françoise.

The works published during his lifetime include the following collections:

- Livre de sonates en trio, trio sonatas (1705)
- Two Livres de sonates à violon seul, sonatas for solo violin (1710 and 1720)
- Les caractères de la guerre, instrumental concerts (1718, a revised version published in 1733)
- Three little harpsichord collections (1705) and three great ones (1724, 1728 and 1734)

A volume of organ noëls, which revised and enlarged a similar book published by his uncle, Pierre Dandrieu in 1714 (rev. in the 1720s). This was published posthumously by sister, Jeanne-Françoise, in 1759. Dandrieu also published an academic treatise on accompaniment (Principes de l'accompagnement) in 1718, which now serves as an important source of information on the musical practice of the era.

Dandrieu's harpsichord writing is reminiscent of that of François Couperin, but with more effective use of counterpoint, which reminds the listener of German Baroque music. The strict traditional suite "à la Froberger" is abandoned in his works, many dance movements replaced with the so-called pièces de caractère, pieces with descriptive titles that were common in French music of the 18th century. Dandrieu's harpsichord oeuvre is, after those of François Couperin and Jean-Nicolas Geoffroy, the most important in terms of sheer quantity of pieces.

== Media ==
Récit de tierce en taille from Organ Suite in G Major

Magnificat I from Organ Suite in D Major

Basse de cromorne from Organ Suite in D Major

Duo trompettes from Organ Suite in D Major

Duo cors de chasse from Organ Suite in D Major

Fugue on Ave Maris Stella

== See also ==
- French baroque harpsichordists
- French organ school
