= Nicolas Siret =

French Baroque composer, organist and harpsichordist (1663–1754)

- Born: 3 March 1663; Troyes, Champagne, France
- Died: 22 June 1754 (aged 91); Troyes, Champagne, France
- Occupations: Composer; organist; harpsichordist
- Era: Baroque
- Style: Classical

Nicolas Siret (3 March 1663 – 22 June 1754) was a French Baroque composer, organist and harpsichordist. He was born in and died in Troyes, Champagne, France, where he worked as organist in the Church of Saint Jean and the Cathedral of Saint Peter and Saint Paul. Both his grandfather and his father were organists in Troyes.

Siret was a friend and admirer of François Couperin, and his first collection of harpsichord pieces, published in approximately 1709, was dedicated to Couperin. The suites of this collection all begin with a French overture, following the tradition established by Jean-Baptiste Lully. Siret's second volume of harpsichord pieces (Second livre de pièces de clavecin, published in 1719) was, along with Couperin's L'art de toucher le clavecin, one of the last publications to include unmeasured preludes. Siret also wrote some "pièces de caractère" (pieces of descriptive character, not dances), stylistically reminiscent of Couperin, and a single organ work by him survives: Fugue primi toni.

== See also ==
- List of French harpsichordists
