= Jean-Baptiste Buterne =

French classical organist

Jean-Baptiste Buterne (c. 1650 – 28 March 1727) was a French classical organist.

== Biography ==
Jean-Baptiste Buterne was born in Toulouse, Languedoc. His father was an organist.

Jean-Baptiste was appointed an organist at Saint-Étienne-du-Mont in Paris in 1674. He left this position in 1726 and was replaced by Claude-Nicolas Ingrain.

He was appointed organist of the Chapelle royale in 1678, quarter of April, at the same time as Lebègue, Thomelin and Nivers, a position he held until 1702. He was succeeded by Garnier, the organist from Saint-Louis-des-Invalides.

In 1673, he succeeded Henri Du Mont at the organ of Saint-Paul; he remained there until 1726. Daquin succeeded him.

His son, Charles Buterne, a squire, harpsichord master of the Duchess of Burgundy and organist, left behind some compositions and a method of learning music.

== Works ==
- Petites Règles pour l’accompagnement, manuscript kept at the Sainte-Geneviève Library.

== Sources ==
- Dictionnaire de la musique : les hommes et leurs œuvres.
- Georges Servières. Document inédits sur les Organistes français des XVIIe et XVIIIe siècles, Paris, Schola Cantorum, c. 1925.
