= Jean-Nicolas Marrigues =

French organist

Jean-Nicolas Marrigues (1757 – 15 March 1834) was a French organist.

During the French Revolution period, Marrigues was an organist at the Versailles Cathedral. Later he came to Paris and became an organist at the Clicquot-organ von Saint-Thomas d’Aquin church, St.Nicolas-des Champs church and St. Gervais church where he succeeded the last organist from the Couperin family. He also taught at the "Institut National des Jeunes Aveugles".

Martigues left behind about thirty organ works, including several fugues, which were only recently published for the first time.
