= Christophe Moyreau =

French organist, harpsichordist and composer

Christophe Moyreau (4 April 1700 – 11 May 1774) was a French Baroque composer, organist and harpsichordist.

== Biography ==
Moyreau was born and spent most of his life in Orléans into an old family of the city. He became organist at Orléans Collégiale Saint-Aignan in February 1719 and at Orléans Cathedral in January 1738 and occupied this position until around 1772.

His music displayed a variety of stylistic innovations and was considerably different from his contemporaries' works. A provincial composer, Moyreau did not achieve much fame during his lifetime and is almost completely forgotten today. His most known and most frequently performed piece is Les Cloches d'Orléans, an organ composition that imitates the bells of Orléans Cathedral.

== Works ==
Moyreau's surviving oeuvre consists of 6 livres of keyboard music. None of the pieces are dated, but it is known that Moyreau got a publication privilege on 30 January 1753 and that all six collections were published the same year, engraved by Marie-Charlotte Vendôme, one of the finest engravers of the era; who was also responsible for the first publication of Mozart's music in 1764 (KV6 and KV7). Moyreau dedicated the pieces to Louis Philippe I, Duke of Orléans (the full title read: Pièces de clavecin dédiées à Son Altesse Sérénissime Monseigneur le Duc d’Orléans). Only one exemplar of books I-II survives, and two of books III-VI.

The dance suites from books I-V are particularly notable for their length and variety of included pieces. A single suite may contain as many as 26 movements (which is far more than in any other suite ever composed), usually beginning with an introductory overture followed by several standard dance movements. The movements that come after these are usually pieces with descriptive titles, not unlike Couperin's, highly varied in style and mood. Livre 6, uniquely for French harpsichord music, consists of several three-movement keyboard simphonies written in Italian style.

Contemporary sources also mention a treatise by Moyreau, Petit abrégé des principes de musique par demandes et réponses (1753), which has been conserved at Orléans (Médiathèque), at the Cornell University of Ithaca and at the Newberry Library of Chicago (USA).

In 2022, Brilliant Classics released a 7-CD set of Moyreau's "Complete Harpsichord Music" with Fernando De Luca, harpsichord (catalogue number 96285). The instrument is a Blanchet copy and the recordings took place at the Palazzo Annibaldeschi, Monte Compatri, Rome, Italy.

== Recordings ==
1-French Collection (2017); Katarzyna Kowalik (harpsichord); Recording includes La Chinoisse and La Japonoisse (op. 1).

2- Cristophe Moyreau: Complete Harpsichord Music Fernando De Luca

== See also ==
- List of French harpsichordists

== Free scores ==
- Free scores by Christophe Moyreau at the International Music Score Library Project (IMSLP)
