= Charles Buterne =

French composer

Charles Buterne (c. 1710 – c. 1760) was a French composer of the Baroque music era.

Charles Buterne's father was Jean-Baptiste Buterne, an organ player. Charles Buterne was squire, organist and harpsichord master of the Duchess of Burgundy.

He left some compositions and a method of learning music. The two compositions that have survived are: Six sonates pour la vielle, musette, violon, flûtes, hautbois et pardessus de violles op.2 (Paris and Lyons, n.d.; ed. H. Ruf, Wilhelmshaven, 1981–3) and Méthode pour apprendre la musique vocale et instrumentale.
