= L'art de toucher le clavecin =

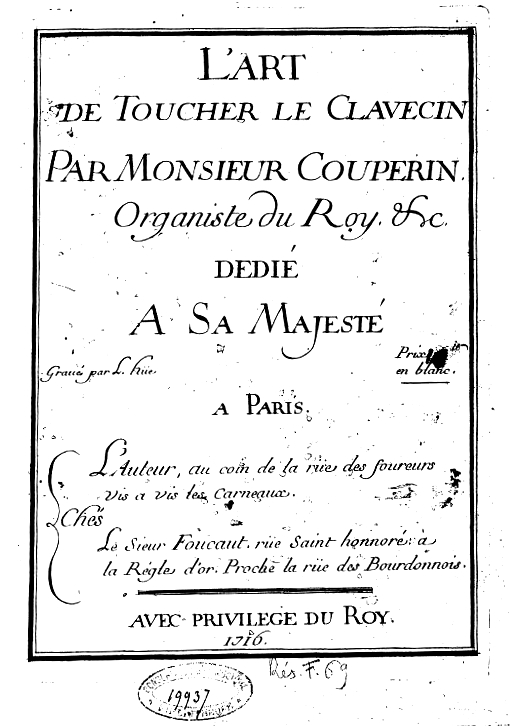
Title page of the first edition.

Cinquième prelude
from L'art de toucher le clavecin, performed by Robert Schröter on a harpsichord tuned in equal temperament

Cinquième prelude
The same work performed in a reconstructed tuning of "temperament ordinaire", which could have been used in France at Couperin's time

L'art de toucher le clavecin (English: The Art of Playing the Harpsichord) is a didactic treatise by the French composer François Couperin. It was first published in 1716, and was followed by a revised edition in 1717.

The treatise was written to instruct keyboard players in performance practice, particularly for Couperin's Pièces de Clavecin; Couperin, upon its publication, noted that it was "absolutely indispensable for playing my Pièces in the style most suitable to them". With the early music revival, it became one of the primary sources for the keyboard fingering system which prevailed in Europe during the Baroque era. It also sheds light on the ornamentation used at the time. It is considered one of the most significant surviving treatises of the period.

== Publication history and contents ==
There are no known autograph copies of the treatise, but copies survive of the two versions published during Couperin's lifetime. The 1716 edition of the work included eight simple Preludes and an original Allemande, technique exercises and instructions, fingering notes for passages in Pièces de Clavecin, and an essay about ornamentation. The 1717 edition added a new preface and a supplement outlining fingering for the second book of Pièces de Clavecin.

L'art de toucher le clavecin was one of the last books to include unmeasured preludes for harpsichord (though bar numbers were added for teaching purposes), along with Nicolas Siret's second volume of harpsichord pieces (Second livre de pièces de clavecin, published in 1719).
