= Pierre Février =

French composer, organist, and harpsichordist

Pierre Février (21 March 1696 – 5 November 1760) was a French baroque composer, organist and harpsichordist.

== Biography ==
Born in Abbeville, Province of Picardy, in 1696, he arrived in Paris in 1720 and served as titular organist of two churches on Saint-Honoré street: the Jacobins' church (destroyed at the Revolution) and Saint-Roch (still standing). Claude-Bénigne Balbastre, who moved to Paris in 1750, was among his pupils and eventually succeeded Février at Saint-Roch. Pierre Février died in Paris on 5 November 1760.

== Works ==
Two volumes of his harpsichord pieces are extant. The first one is dated 1734 and contains five suites:

- Suite in A major
  - Allemande la Magnanime
  - Le Concert des Dieux - Double du concert
  - La Délectable
  - Le Berceau
  - La Boufonne ou la Paysanne
- Suite in D minor
  - Fugue
  - Courante
  - Les Plaisirs des Sens
  - Le Labyrinthe
  - Ariette et doubles
- Suite in B minor
  - Fugue
  - L'Intrépide
  - La Grotesque
- Suite in D major
  - Gavotte et doubles
  - Le Brinborion
  - Le Tendre Language
  - Tambourin
- Suite (Festes de Campagne) in C major
  - Entrée
  - Musette
  - 2 Menuets
  - Le Gros Colas et la Grosse Jeanne
  - Les Petites Bergères

The second volume, composed after 1734 and before 1737, was discovered in the late 1990s in a private collection in Belgium (Arenberg). It contains two harpsichord suites that follow a similar pattern, mixing dances and descriptive pièces de caractère in the typical late Baroque French tradition:

- 1st Suite in G Minor
  - Les Liens Harmoniques - Rondeau
  - La Caressante - Rondeau
  - La Fertillante
  - La petite Coquette
  - Tambourin - Rondeau
- 2nd Suite in C Minor
  - Allemande
  - Les Tendres Tourterelles - Rondeau
  - Les Croisades - Rondeau
  - Menuet

== See also ==
- French baroque harpsichordists
