= Louis-Nicolas Clérambault =

French composer and organist

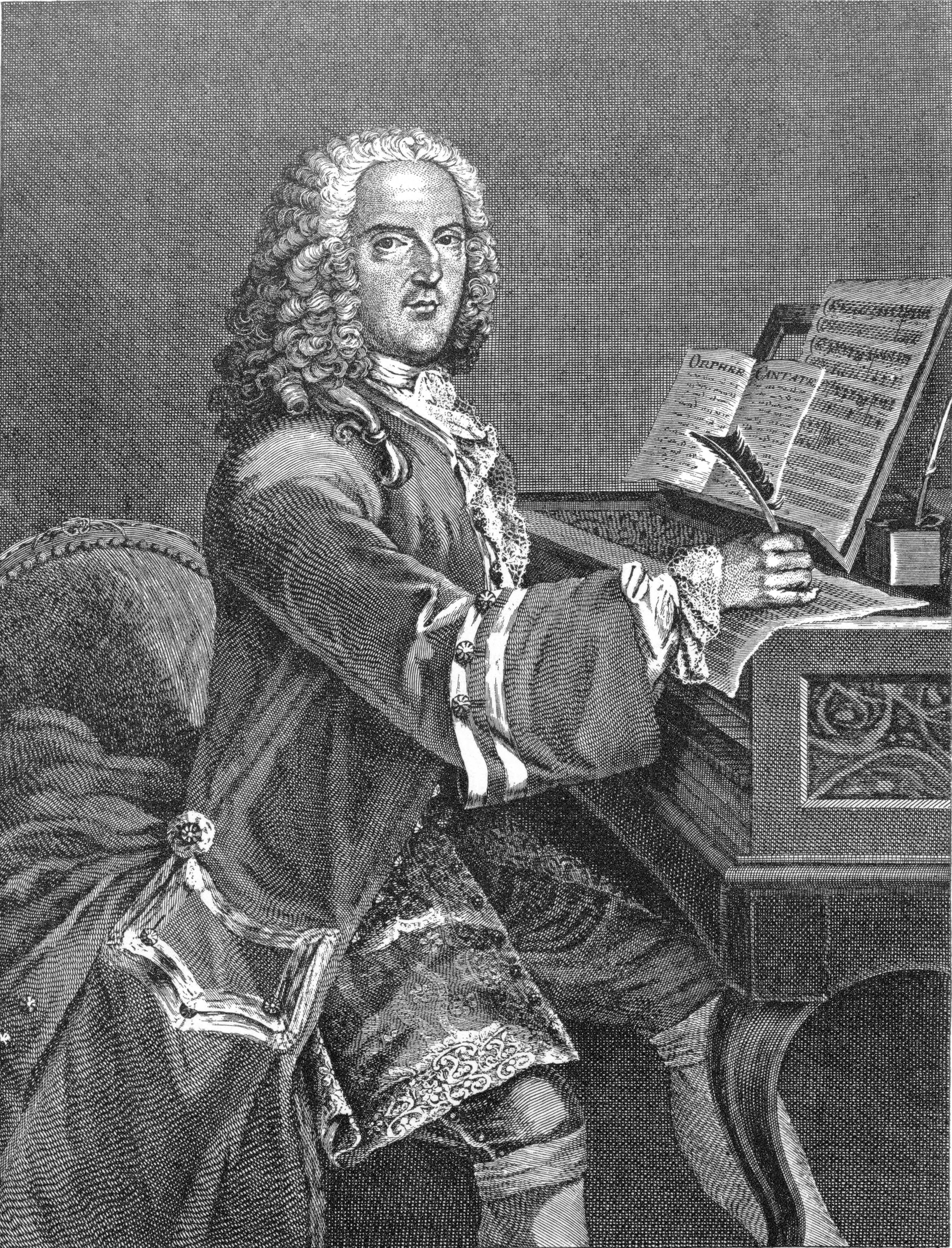
- Born: 19 December 1676; Paris, France
- Died: 26 October 1749 (aged 72); Paris, France
- Occupations: Composer and organist

Louis-Nicolas Clérambault (19 December 1676 – 26 October 1749) was a French baroque musician, best known as an organist and composer. He was born, and later died, in Paris.

== Biography ==
Clérambault came from a musical family (his father and two of his sons were also musicians). While very young, he learned to play the violin and harpsichord and he studied the organ with André Raison. Clérambault also studied composition and voice with Jean-Baptiste Moreau.

Clérambault became the organist at the church of the Grands-Augustins and entered the service of Madame de Maintenon. After the death of Louis XIV and Guillaume-Gabriel Nivers, he succeeded the latter at the organ of the church of Saint-Sulpice and the royal house of Saint-Cyr, an institution for young girls from the poor nobility. He was responsible there for music, the organ, directing chants and choir, etc. It was in this post—it remained his after the death of Madame de Maintenon—that he developed the genre of the "French cantata" of which he was the uncontested master. In 1719 he succeeded his teacher André Raison at the organs of the church of the Grands-Jacobins.

Basse et dessus de trompette (1710)
Movement 5 of Suite du Premier Ton (Suite in C major) from his 1710 publication, Livre d'Orgue

His Motet du Saint Sacrement in G major is one of the first French works known to have been performed in Philadelphia.

== Works ==
His important published work includes:

- a large number of religious pieces with chants and choirs, (motets, hymns, Magnificat, Te Deum etc.);
- more than 25 secular cantatas on subjects often inspired by Greco-Roman myths;
- sonatas for violin and basso continuo:
- a book of dance pieces for the harpsichord (1704) in which he adopted the tradition of the unmeasured prelude;
- a book of organ pieces in two suites (1710) in which melodic charm wins out over religious spirit. These two collections seemed destined to begin a cycle of pieces in all keys but Clérambault never completed the cycle.

=== By catalogue number ===
- 1: Cantata Book I No. 1: L'amour piqué par une abeille
- 2: Cantata Book I No. 2: Le jaloux
- 3: Cantata Book I No. 3: Orphée
- 4: Cantata Book I No. 4: Polyphême
- 5: Cantata Book I No. 5: Médée
- 6: Cantata Book I No. 6: L'amour et Bacchus
- 7: Cantata Book II No. 1: Alphée et Aréthuse
- 8: Cantata Book II No. 2: Léandre et Héro
- 9: Cantata Book II No. 3: La musette
- 10: Cantata Book II No. 4: Pirame et Tisbé
- 11: Cantata Book II No. 5: Pigmalion
- 12: Cantata Book II No. 6: Le triomphe de la paix
- 13: Cantata: Le bouclier de Minerve
- 14: Cantata: Abraham
- 15: Cantata Book III No. 1: Apollon
- 16: Cantata Book III No. 2: Zéphire et Flore
- 17: Cantata Book III No. 3: L'isle de Délos
- 18: Cantata Book III No. 4: La mort d'Hercule
- 19: Cantata: La muse de l'Opéra
- 20: Cantata Book IV No. 1: L'amour guéri par l'amour
- 21: Cantata Book IV No. 2: Apollon et Doris
- 22: Cantata: Le soleil, vainqueur des nuages
- 23: Cantata Book V No. 1: Clitie
- 24: Cantata Book V No. 2: Les forges de Vulcain
- 25: Cantata: Les francs masçons
- 26: Choeurs et intermèdes de l'idille de St Cyr
- 27: Choeurs de l'idille de St Cyr sur le départ du roi
- 28: Le triomphe d'Iris
- 29: Le triomphe de la vertu, ou Hercule vainqueur des plaisirs
- 30: Himne de Saint Louis
- 31: Idille sur la naissance de Nôtre Seigneur de Moreau (arrangement)
- 32: Le retour du printemps (lost)
- 33: Daphnis et Sylvie (lost)
- 34: Air à boire: Enfin nos voeux sont satisfaits in C major
- 35: Air à boire: C'en est fait j'ai brisé ma chaîne in G major
- 36: Air italien: Vuol parlar il mio cuore in F major
- 37: Air à boire: Buveurs trop altérés in E minor
- 38: Ariette: Hélas! La pauvre fille in E minor
- 39: Air sérieux: Jugez de ma peine extrême in C minor
- 40: Air à boire: Réparons l'honneur de la treille in C major
- 41: Air à boire: Amis, le dieu du vin s'empresse in G major
- 42: Canon: Vive le roi in C major
- 43: Harpsichord Suite No. 1 en C major
- 44: Harpsichord Suite No. 2 en C minor
- 45: Prelude for harpsichord in G major
- 46: Organ suite of the first tone
- 47: Organ suite of the second tone
- 48: Chaconne for violin, viola da gamba and continuo in A major
- 49: Allemande for violin and continuo in A major
- 50: Menuet en rondeau for violin and continuo in A major
- 51: Sonata I in G major "L'anonima"
- 52: Sonata II in G major "La félicité"
- 53: Sonata III in B flat major "L'abondance"
- 54: Sonata IV in F major "Symphonia"
- 55: Sonata V in D major
- 56: Sonata VI in C major "L'impromptu"
- 57: Sonata VII in E minor "La magnifique"
- 58: Motet pour le jour de Noël in A major
- 59: Motet pour le dimanche de la quinquagezime in E minor
- 60: Motet pour le lundy qui précède le caresme in A major
- 61: Motet pour le mardy qui précède le caresme in D minor
- 62: Motet de la Sainte Vierge in C minor
- 63: Motet pour le roy in D minor
- 64: Motet pour l'ascension in B flat major
- 65: Motet du Saint Esprit in E minor
- 66: Motet du Saint Sacrement in E minor
- 67: Motet du Saint Sacrement in D major
- 68: Motet du Saint Sacrement in G major
- 69: Motet pour le bienheureux Vincent de Paul in A major
- 70: Stabat mater in B flat major
- 71: Motet pour Sainte Françoise in A minor
- 72: Motet pour Saint Joseph in G major
- 73: Motet pour le saint jour de pâques in F major
- 74: Motet pour l'ascension in F major
- 75: Motet pour la fête de la Sainte Trinité in F major
- 76: Motet de Saint Jean Baptiste in G major
- 77: Motet de Saint Roch in G major
- 78: Motet pour le bienheureux Vincent de Paul in C major
- 79: Motet pour les Saints Anges in F major
- 80: Motet de Saint Denis in C minor
- 81: Motet pour la fête de tous les saints in B flat major
- 82: Motet pour les apostres in A minor
- 83: Motet du Saint Sacrement in A minor
- 84: Motet du Saint Sacrement in G major
- 85: Motet du Saint Sacrement in F major
- 86: Motet du Saint Sacrement in D minor
- 87: Motet du Saint Sacrement in D major
- 88: Motet de la Sainte Vierge in A major
- 89: Motet de la Sainte Vierge in G minor
- 90: Motet de la Sainte Vierge in G major
- 91: Motet de la Sainte Vierge in D major
- 92: Motet de la Sainte Vierge in C minor
- 93: Motet de la Sainte Vierge pour le caresme in G minor
- 94: Motet de la Sainte Vierge pour le tems de pasques in G major
- 95: Motet de la Sainte Vierge in A major
- 96: Motet de la Sainte Vierge in D minor
- 97: Domine salvum in A minor
- 98: Domine salvum in F major
- 99: Cantique des anges in D major
- 100: Antienne à la Sainte Vierge pour le temps pascal in G major
- 101: Motet de Saint Benoit in G major
- 102: Motet de Saint Bernard in G major
- 103: Motet de Saint Michel in D major
- 104: Antienne à la Sainte Vierge in G minor
- 105: Motet de Saint Dominique in G major
- 106: Motet du Saint Sacrement in F major
- 107: Motet de Saint Jean l'Evangéliste in A major
- 108: Motet de Saint Augustin in D minor
- 109: Motet de la Sainte Vierge in C minor
- 110: Motet du Saint Sacrement in A major
- 111: Motet pour la fête de l'assomption in D major
- 112: Motet de Saint Sulpice in D major
- 113: Motet de Saint Pie in D major
- 114: Salve regina in E minor
- 115: Motet de Sainte Chantal in A major
- 116: Miserere à 3 in G minor
- 117: De profundis clamavi in D minor
- 118: Ecce quam bonum in G major
- 119: Dominus quis habitabit in A major
- 120: Judica me Deus in G minor
- 121: Exaltabo te Domine in A major
- 122: Exultate Deo in G major
- 123: Miserere in C minor
- 124: Motet de la Sainte Vierge in G minor
- 125: Conturbatus est spiritus meus in C minor
- 126: Motet de Saint Jean Baptiste in D major
- 127: Motet de la Sainte Vierge in F major
- 128: Motet du Saint Sacrement in D major
- 129: Motet de Saint Sulpice in G major
- 130: Viderunt te aquae Deus in E minor
- 131: Motet du Saint Sacrement in C minor
- 132: Antienne à la Sainte Vierge in C major
- 133: Motet du Saint Sacrement in F major
- 134: Motet du Saint Sacrement in A minor
- 135: Motet de la Sainte Vierge in D minor
- 136: Magnificat à trois parties in F major
- 137: Te Deum in A minor
- 138: Te Deum in C major
- 139: Dixit Dominus in E minor
- 140: Regina caeli in F major
- 141: Exultate Deo in D major
- 142: Audite gentes in D major
- 143: Motet pour le sacré coeur de Jésus in A major
- 144: Motet pour la nativité de Saint Jean Baptiste in G major
- 145: Motet pour Saint Sulpice in A major
- 146: Motet pour le roy, la reine et le dauphin in A major
- 147: Pseaume 28 in C major
- 148: Motet de Saint Sulpice in D major
- 149: Motet pour la dédicace de l'eglise de Saint Sulpice in D major
- 150: Motet pour la canonisation de Saint Pie in G major
- 151: Motet de Saint Sulpice in B flat major
- 152: Motet pour le roy in B flat major
- 153: Pseaume 121 in C major
- 154: Magnificat à trois parties in D minor
- 155: Te Deum à trois parties in C major
- 156: Motet du Saint Sacrement in A major
- 157: Motet pour le roy in A major
- 158: Motet pour le roy in G minor
- 159: Motet pour le roy in E minor
- 160: Stabat mater in B flat major
- 161: Exaudiat in D minor
- 162: Exaudiat in F major
- 163: O sacrum convivium in A major
- 164: Tantum ergo in A minor
- 165: O salutaris hostia in E minor
- 166: Adoramus te Christe in A minor
- 167: Pie Jesu in C minor
- 168: Litanies du sacré coeur de Jésus in C major
- 169: Vovete et redite in G major
- 170: Salve regina in D minor
- 171: Motet pour la fête de la Sainte Trinité in G major
- 172: Motet de Saint Augustin in F major (Nivers arr. Clérambault)
- 173: O salutaris in A major (Nivers arr. Clérambault)
- 174: Motet du Saint Sacrement in D major (Nivers arr. Clérambault)
- 175: Motet du Saint Sacrement in G minor (Nivers arr. Clérambault)
- 176: Motet du Saint Sacrement in A major (Nivers arr. Clérambault)
- 177: Motet de la Sainte Vierge in A major (Nivers arr. Clérambault)
- 178: Motet de la Sainte Vierge in A major (Nivers arr. Clérambault)
- 179: Motet de la Sainte Vierge in D major (Nivers arr. Clérambault)
- 180: Motet de la Sainte Vierge in A major (Nivers arr. Clérambault)
- 181: Motet de la Sainte Vierge in D major (Nivers arr. Clérambault)
- 182: Motet de la Sainte Vierge in F major (Nivers arr. Clérambault)
- 183–188: 6 Leçons de ténèbres (lost)
- 189: O Filii (lost)
- 190: Laudemus cantemus (lost)
- 191: L'histoire de la femme adultère
- 192: Air spirituel: Vertus – Misères du pêché in C minor
- 193: Air spirituel: Stance in A minor
- 194: Air spirituel: Vertus – La résignation in F major
- 195: Air spirituel: Le paradis in A major
- 196: Airs spirituels: Louanges de Dieu in E minor
- 197: Air spirituel: Mistères de Notre Seigneur J.C. – Moment in B flat major
- 198: Air spirituel: Mistères de Notre Seigneur J.C. – Sa résurrection in B flat major
- 199: Air spirituel: Vertus – Amour de la sagesse in C minor
- 200: Air spirituel: Noël in G major
- 201: Air spirituel: Vertus – L'innocence in G major
- 202: Air spirituel: Cantique de Saint Bernard in G major
- 203: Air spirituel: Vertus – L'education in G minor
- 204: Air spirituel: Vertus – Respect dans le lieu saint in A minor
- 205: Air spirituel: Noël in A major
- 206: Air spirituel: Cantique in A minor
- 207: Airs spirituels: Vices – Le libertinage in D minor
- 208: Air spirituel: Sonnet de Des Barreaux in D minor
- 209: Air spirituel: Vertus – La confiance in G minor
- 210: Air spirituel: Vertus – La sagesse in E minor
- 211: Air spirituel: Cantique de Saint Bernard in C major
- 212: Airs spirituels: Louanges de Dieu in B flat major
- 213: Airs spirituels: Mistères de Notre Seigneur J.C. – Sa circoncision in G major
- 214: Airs spirituels: Les IV fins de l'homme – L'impie détrompé in B flat major
- 215: Air spirituel: Les IV fins de l'homme – Fuite du tems in G major
- 216: Air spirituel: Vertus – Prière dans la tentation in G minor
- 217: Air spirituel: Stance – Mon coeur est accablé in G major
- 218: Air spirituel: Ne cherchons plus que Dieu in G major
- 219: Air spirituel: Stance – N'espérons plus mon âme in D minor
- 220: Air spirituel: Stance – Objets lugubres et funèbres in D minor
- 221: Air spirituel: Sur les O de Noël – O sapientia in D minor
- 222: Air spirituel: Sur les O de Noël – O adonai in D major
- 223: Air spirituel: Sur les O de Noël – O radix Jesse in F major
- 224: Air spirituel: Sur les O de Noël – O clavis David in F major
- 225: Air spirituel: Sur les O de Noël – O oriens in G major
- 226: Air spirituel: Sur les O de Noël – O rex gentium in G major
- 227: Air spirituel: Sur les O de Noël – O Emmanuel in E minor
- 228: Air spirituel: O vive flamme in A major
- 229: Airs spirituels: Mistères de Notre Seigneur J.C. – Son incarnation in G major
- 230: Air spirituel: Stance – Pour un pécheur in C minor
- 231: Airs spirituels: Les IV fins de l'homme – La mort in B minor
- 232: Air spirituel: Stance – Quand je pense au Seigneur in G major
- 233: Air spirituel: Mistères de Notre Seigneur J.C. – Sa mort in F major
- 234: Air spirituel: Vices – L'oisiveté in A major
- 235: Air spirituel: Sur les désirs de la mort in C minor
- 236: Air spirituel: Les IV fins de l'homme – Le paradis in A major
- 237: Air spirituel: Désir de la mort in B flat major
- 238: Air spirituel: Stance – Vous me cherchez Seigneur in D minor
- 239: Règles d'accompagnement

== See also ==
- French organ school

Preceded by Guillaume-Gabriel Nivers	Titular Organist Church of Saint-Sulpice, Paris; 1714–1749	Succeeded by César-François Clérambault
