= François d'Agincourt =

French harpsichordist, organist and composer

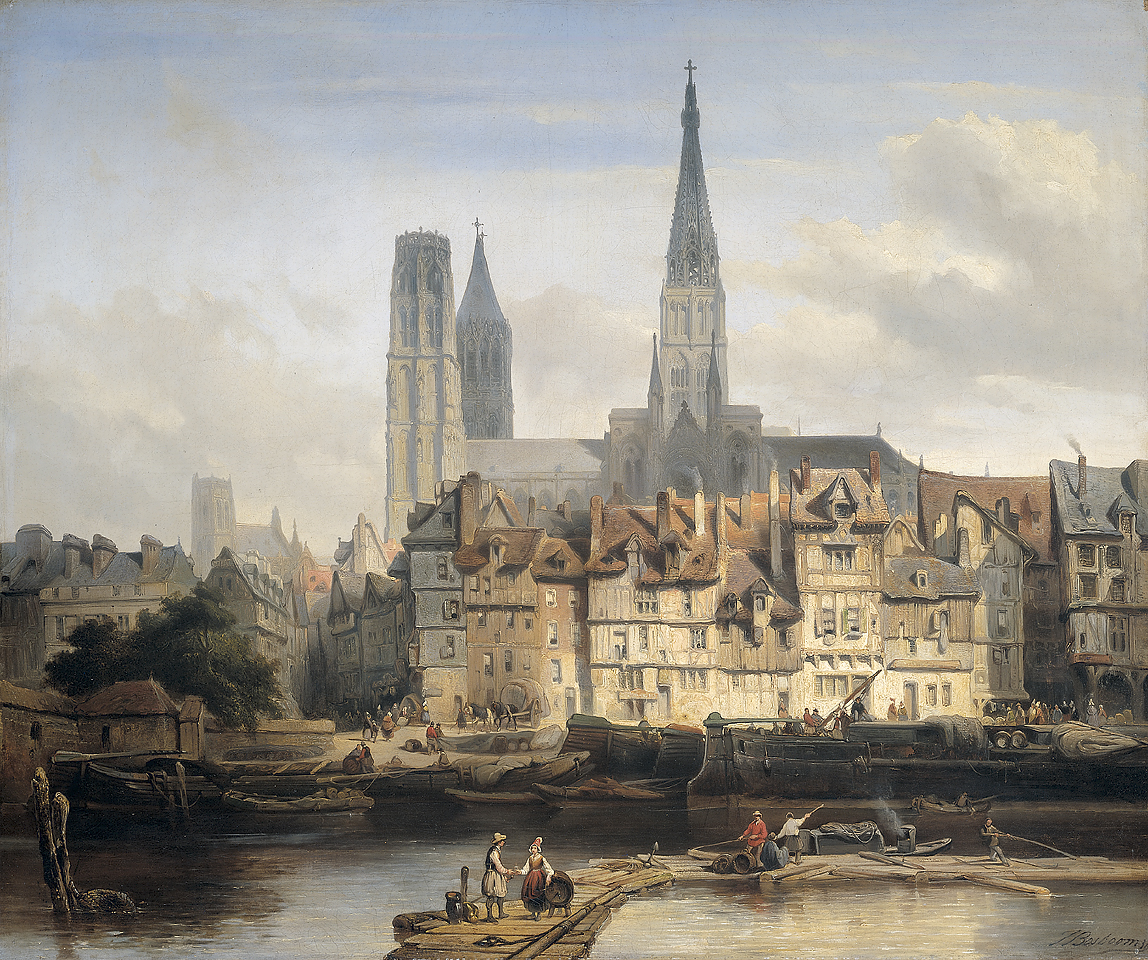
- An 1839 painting of The Quay de Paris in Rouen. The Rouen Cathedral, where d'Agincourt worked for 52 years, is visible in the background

Background information
- Born: 1684; Rouen, France
- Died: April 30, 1758

François d'Agincourt (also d'Agincour, Dagincourt, Dagincour) (1684 – 30 April 1758) was a French harpsichordist, organist, and composer. He spent most of his life in Rouen, his native city, where he worked as organist of the Rouen Cathedral and of three smaller churches. Highly regarded during his lifetime, d'Agincourt was one of the organists of the royal chapel. The single surviving book of harpsichord music by him contains masterful pieces inspired by François Couperin; also extant are some 40 organ works that survive in manuscript copies.

== Biography ==
D'Agincourt was born in Rouen and received his early musical training there. He soon left for Paris where he probably studied under Nicolas Lebègue. Between 1701 and 1706 he worked as organist of Sainte-Madeleine-en-la-Cité in Paris, and in 1706 he went back to Rouen and became organist of the Rouen Cathedral, succeeding Jacques Boyvin. He kept the post until his death some 52 years later. Later he also took jobs at St. Herbland, the Abbey of Saint-Ouen (he would hold both of these until his death as well), and at St. Jean, all in Rouen. By 1714 he was sufficiently well-known and respected to be appointed one of the four organists of the royal chapel. Jacques Duphly studied with d'Agincourt about 1730–31, but his surviving works do not show any considerable influence of his teacher's style.

D'Agincourt only published a single collection of his music, 1er livre de clavecin (Paris, 1733). It contains 43 pieces for harpsichord, clearly influenced by François Couperin: the pieces are organized into ordres, make good use of ornamentation, and many are character pieces: genre scenes, portraits (sometimes double portraits), etc. D'Agincourt's organ music, which survives in a manuscript copy made by the renegade French priest and scientist Alexandre Guy Pingré. The manuscript, now conserved in the Bibliothèque nationale de France, consists of 46 pieces for liturgical use. They are more progressive than Couperin's organ works, with frequent use of elements of the style galant. The pieces are organized according to mode, as is usual in French organ music, but for unknown reasons d'Agincourt omits the third mode altogether. Suites in the first three modes (i.e., 1, 2, and 4) are less developed than the remaining ones. Apart from keyboard pieces, only three songs for soloist and basso continuo are known, published in the anthology Recueil d'airs sérieux et à boire in 1713 and 1716.

A portrait of one Barthélemy-Jean-Claude Pupil is frequently misidentified as a portrait of d'Agincourt.

== See also ==
- French organ school
- French baroque harpsichordists
