= Couperin family =

French family of composers

The Couperin family was a musical dynasty of professional composers and performers. They were the most prolific family in French musical history, active during the Baroque era (17th—18th centuries). Louis Couperin and his nephew, François Couperin le grand, are the best known members of the family.

== History ==
The earliest mention of the name Couperin is from 1366, but the first musician of the family was apparently Mathurin Couperin (c.1569–c.1640). A Beauvoir trader involved in legal and financial matters, Mathurin was also an amateur musician. No compositions by him survive, and he apparently stopped performing in 1619; but he taught his two sons, Denis and Charles. Charles (died 1654) settled in Chaumes-en-Brie, a little town about 30 miles east of Paris, around 1601. He became a farmer and, eventually, part-time organist at the Benedictine abbey of St. Pierre (not the parish church). At least three of Charles' many children became professional musicians: Louis (1626–1661), François (1631–1701), and Charles (1639–1679).

The family's breakthrough came around 1650, when Jacques Champion de Chambonnières, then harpsichordist to the King of France, was visiting Brie. Le Parnasse François, a famous 1732 book by Évrard Titon du Tillet, contains an account of Chambonnières's visit: apparently Louis, François, and Charles visited Chambonnières on the Feast of Saint James—Chambonnières' name day—and offered the host and his guests a short concert, playing several pieces composed by Louis. The royal harpsichordist was so impressed with their skills that he took Louis to Paris with him, and by 1651 the young composer was already living there. His brothers joined him soon afterwards. In 1653 Louis became the organist of Church Saint-Gervais: when he died, he was succeeded by Charles, Charles was succeeded by his son, and so on; the Couperins occupied the position for 173 years.

Louis was evidently a very successful and influential composer, but he died young, in 1661, and most of his compositions remained unpublished until the 20th century. Some years after his death, the second of the two most important Couperins was born: François Couperin, nicknamed le Grand—"the Great". Although suffering from poor health throughout his life, François was a very prolific composer. He produced four livres of harpsichord pieces that represent the summit of the French harpsichord school, authored an influential and historically important treatise on harpsichord playing (L'art de toucher le clavecin), and produced a number of other, sacred and secular works, that are still well known today.

== Simplified family tree ==
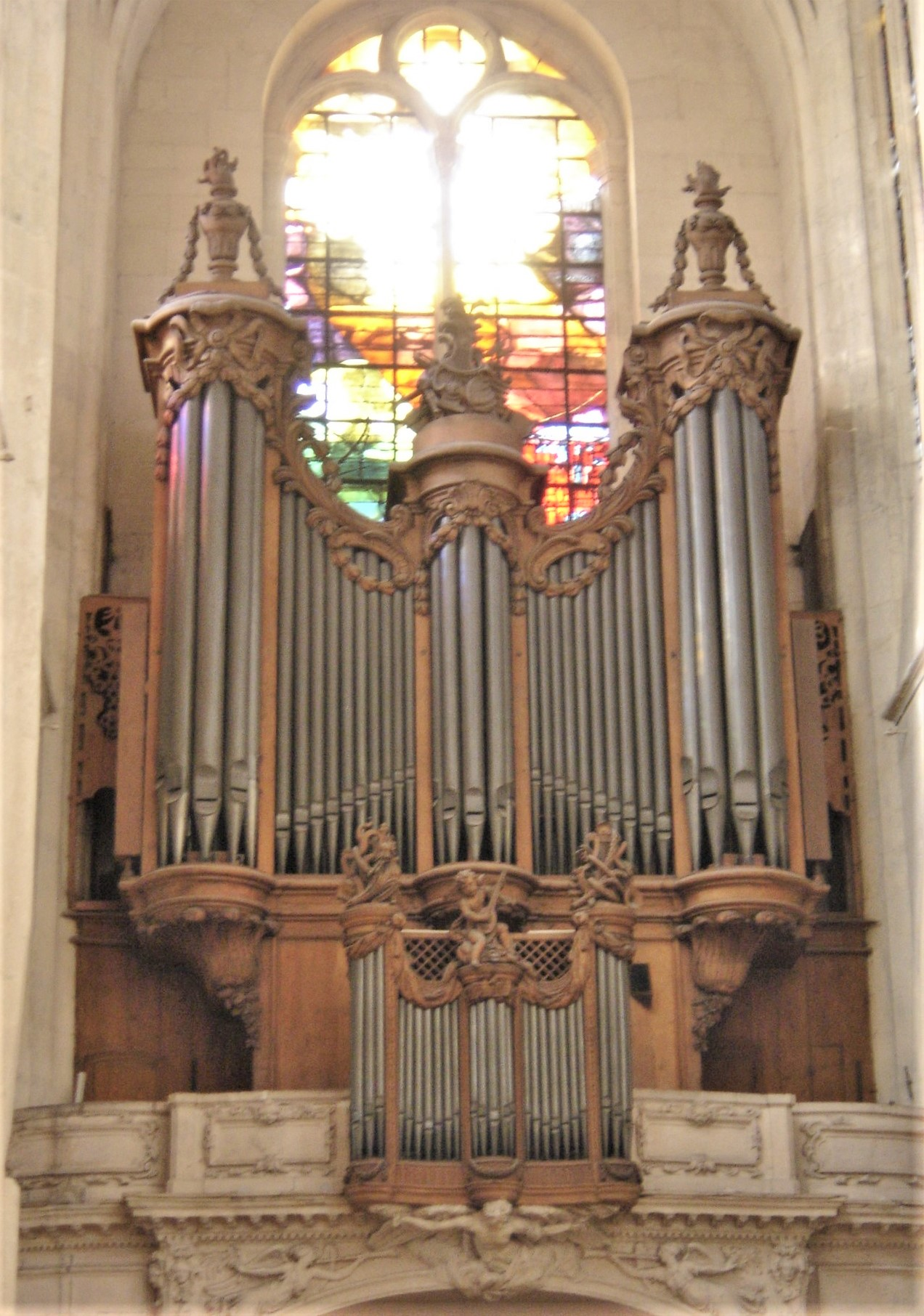
Organ of Saint-Gervais church

Organists of the Church Saint-Gervais are given in bold. The number in parentheses indicates the order of succession, i.e. Louis was the first organist of the church, succeeded by Charles, who was succeeded by François, etc.

- Mathurin Couperin, died 1640; farmer, instrumentalist
  - Denis, died 1656; notary, instrumentalist
  - Charles the older, died 1654; instrumentalist
    - **Louis (1)** (1626–1661); harpsichordist, organist and gambist
    - François (c. 1631–1708/12); violinist, violist and harpsichordist)
      - Marguerite-Louise (1676–1728) soprano singer and harpsichordist
      - **Nicolas (4)** (1680–1748), organist
        - **Armand-Louis (5)** (1727–1789); organist
          - **Pierre-Louis (6)** (1755–1789); organist
          - **Gervais-François (7)** (1759–1826); organist
            - Céleste-Thérèse **(8)** (1795–1860); organist
          - Nicolas-Louis (1760–after 1817)
    - **Charles (2)** (1639–1679); organist
      - **François the Great (3)** (1668–1733); organist and harpsichordist
        - Marie-Madeleine (1690–1742); nun, organist
        - François-Laurent (died after 1740)
        - Marguerite-Antoinette (1705–1778); harpsichordist of the King's chamber

== See also ==
- List of musical families (classical music)
