= Jean-Baptiste Moreau (composer) =

French composer

Jean-Baptiste Moreau (French pronunciation: [ʒɑ̃ batist mɔʁo]; c.1656 – 24 August 1733) was a French composer of the baroque period. He served as the master of music at the court of Louis XIV. His compositional output includes several motets and music for the theatre.

== Life and career ==
Born in Angers, Province of Anjou, Moreau was a choirboy at the Cathédrale Saint-Maurice d'Angers, and it was there that he received his musical education. He worked in Langres and Dijon for short periods, before moving to Paris to become a court musician. He eventually was appointed master of music at the court and was awarded a pension from the king upon his retirement. Moreau contributed original music to the premieres of the final two plays of Racine, Esther and Athalie. Moreau also composed musical interludes for Duche's Jonathas, Boyer's Jephte, Absalon, Debora and various divertissements. He was also active as a teacher and counts among his pupils Louis-Nicolas Clérambault, Jean-François Dandrieu, and Michel Pignolet de Montéclair. He died in Paris.
