= Marguerite-Antoinette Couperin =

French harpsichordist

Marguerite-Antoinette Couperin (19 September 1705 – c. 1778) was a French harpsichordist, the first woman to hold the position of ordinaire de la musique de la chambre du roi pour le clavecin (court musician to the King of France).

== Life ==
The Couperin family were a dynastic French musical family of professional composers and performers first mentioned in 1366. Marguerite-Antoinette was born in Paris, the daughter of François Couperin (the Great). She became active at the French court from at least 1729 (she is mentioned in an article in the Mercure de France).

On 16 February 1730 she succeeded her father in the office of Ordinary musician of the King's chamber for the harpsichord when her father retired. This was a feature of French courtly music in which musicians were able to bequeath or sell their positions in a system called survivance. The title Ordinaire is the most junior rank in the hierarchy of the court's musicians and reflected her age and relative inexperience.

She was the first woman to take up a position as court musician. She also taught harpsichord to Louis XV's daughters.

On 25 November 1741, she sold her office to Bernard de Bury (1720–1785) for 6000 livres, as she was unable to continue in it herself for reasons of health. She died in Paris.

== See also ==
- Marguerite-Louise Couperin (1676–1728) an older cousin and a celebrated soprano singer and harpsichordist.
