= Armand-Louis Couperin =

French composer, organist, and harpsichordist

Armand-Louis Couperin (25 February 1727 – 2 February 1789) was a French composer, organist, and harpsichordist of the late Baroque and early Classical periods. He was a member of the Couperin family of musicians, of which the most notable were his great-uncle Louis and his cousin François.

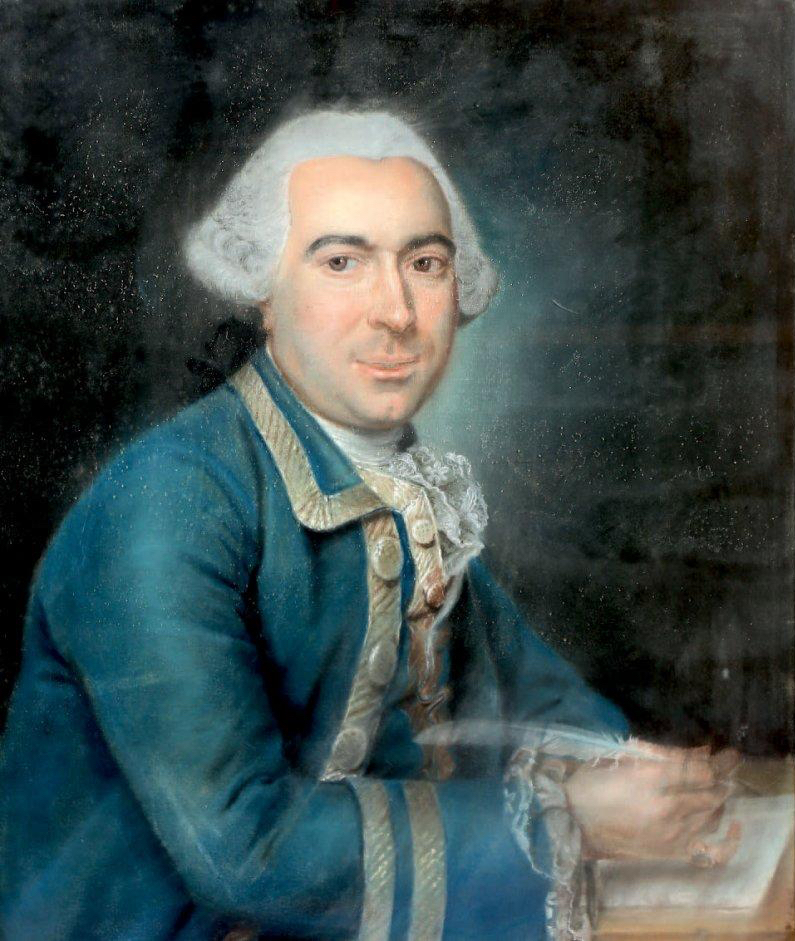
Armand-Louis Couperin, by Charles-Nicolas Noël

== Biography ==
Couperin was born in Paris. His mother died when he was only 17 months old and he was raised by his father, Nicolas, also a composer and the successor to François Couperin "Le Grand" as organist at St. Gervais Church in 1748. Nothing is known of Armand-Louis Couperin's education, though his library at the time of death contained 885 books, unusual for a musician and evidence of scholarly interest.

At age 21, Couperin's father died without leaving a will, making him the sole heir of both his parents. His inheritance included Nicolas's post at St. Gervais. In 1752, Couperin married Elisabeth-Antoinette Blanchet, a professional musician and the daughter of the best harpsichord maker in France, François-Etienne Blanchet. They had four children, three of whom became musicians.

Couperin and his wife taught harpsichord lessons and she was the organist at the abbey of Montmartre. Following his departure from St. Gervais, Couperin's many posts included St. Barthélemy (to 1772), St Jean-en-Grève, the convent of the Carmes-Billettes, Notre Dame (from 1755), the Sainte Chapelle (from 1760), Sainte Marguerite, and the Royal Chapel (from 1770).

Couperin died at age 61 in Paris in a traffic accident while hurrying from Vespers at Sainte Chapelle to St. Gervais.

== Music ==
References to Couperin by his contemporaries, including Charles Burney, laud his improvisational virtuosity (often on the Te Deum hymn) and established his reputation as one of the two best organists of the era. Nevertheless, only one piece for organ exists today.

Couperin did not publish his church music and he refused to write for the theatre. His surviving works are almost exclusively for the keyboard, or keyboard and small chamber ensemble.

Unlike many of his contemporaries, Couperin remained attached stylistically to la grande tradition française, and his pieces have been criticized for their lack of modernity. However, David Fuller cites his experimental impulse and urge to explore the possibilities of instruments. An example is his Simphonie de clavecins, the only work in existence that requires two harpsichords with genouillères (knee-levers that allowed diminuendos).

== Works ==
- 3 cantatilles (lost) : Le Printemps, La Jeunesse, La Vieillesse
- L’Amour Médecin, cantatille for soprano, 2 violins, bass, (1750)
- Pièces de Clavecin, Opus I (1751)
- Sonates en pièces de clavecin with violin, Opus II (1765)
- Sonates en trio (1770)
- 3 Quatuors à deux clavecins (1773)
- Symphonie pour clavecins
- Dialogue entre le chalumeau et le basson, for organ (1775)
- Variations pour clavecin:
  - sur l’air Vous l’ordonnez (1775)
  - Aria con variazione (1781)
  - sur l’air Richard Cœur de Lion (1784)
- Several motets of which only one remains: Motet au Saint Sacrement (1787)

=== Pièces de Clavecin (1751) ===
- La Victoire
- Allemande
- Courante, La de Croissy
- Les Cacqueteuses
- La Grégoire
- L'Intrépide
- Premier menuet, deuxième menuet
- L'Arlequine ou la Adam, rondeau
- La Blanchet
- La de Boisgelou
- La Foucquet
- La Sémillante ou la Joly
- La Turpin
- Première gavotte, seconde gavotte
- Premier menuet, second menuet
- La du Breüil
- La Chéron
- L'Affligée
- L'Enjouée
- Les tendres Sentiments
- Rondeau
- Les quatre nations
  - L'Italienne
  - L'Angloise, rondeau
  - L'Allemande
  - La Françoise
