= Temperament ordinaire =

Cinquieme Prelude
from L'art de toucher le Clavecin by François Couperin, performed by Robert Schröter on a harpsichord tuned in equal temperament

Cinquieme Prelude
The same work performed in a reconstructed tuning of "temperament ordinaire", which could have been used in France during Couperin's time

The phrase temperament ordinaire (French tempérament ordinaire, meaning literally "ordinary temperament" or "usual temperament") is a term for musical intonation, particularly the tempered tuning of keyboard instruments. In modern usage, it usually refers to temperaments falling within the range (as understood broadly) of tunings now known as "well-tempered".

The expression occurs primarily in French-language works of the 17th and 18th centuries concerning theory and practice of musical intonation with regard to keyboard instruments. It is discussed again, in the same or a similar musical application, in modern literature concerned with historical practices relating to keyboard instruments and performance.

== 17th-century use and application ==
One of the early historical documents in which the phrase was used is Christiaan Huygens' Lettre touchant le cycle harmonique, ("Letter concerning the harmonic cycle") of 1691. This refers several times, in a comparative way, to "temperament ordinaire". The main purpose of Huygens' letter was to describe and discuss an unconventional 31-fold division of the octave. He did this by first recapitulating a conventional known temperament of his time, and then he compared that with his new scheme (which actually had been approximately conceived before, albeit without Huygens' mathematical precision); and he discussed the differences. Huygens' description of the conventional arrangement was quite precise, and it is clearly identifiable with what is now classified as (quarter-comma) meantone temperament. (Note: A little calculation is needed to see the matching correspondence between, on the one hand, the figures in the right hand column of Huygens' table of 1691, which is headed (in French) "Division of the octave following the temperament ordinaire", and on the other hand, the interval-values in the quarter-comma meantone scale. Huygens' figures are in base 10 logarithms, but are negative, and all offset by 5: They range from 5 at the lower C, to 5 − log_{10}(2) at the C an octave above. If H is Huygens' number for any note, then in modern terms, the number of musical cents in the interval that it makes with the lower C is ( 5 − H ) × ( 1200 cents )/ log_{10}(2) and its frequency-ratio with the lower C is antilog_{10}( 5 − H ) . So, for example, Huygens' value of 4.8252574989 for G^{♮} corresponds to ~696.578 ... cents, or by antilogs to a ratio of 1.495348 ... ; and so on.)

Huygens referred to this conventional arrangement, variously, in the course of his comparisons, as "the Temperament that I have just explained", "the Temperament", "the ordinary Temperament" (French: temperament ordinaire), "the Ordinary Temperament" (with both words capitalized), and then by mentioning "the new Temperament" as contrasted with "the one that everyone uses".

Accordingly, it does appear that for Huygens in 1691, temperament ordinaire was a phrase denoting just the temperament in ordinary use, with no sign that he was using this expression as a proper or conventional name or label. It appears from his description that Huygens believed that the ordinary tuning method then in common use was (quarter-comma) meantone temperament.

== 18th century ==
The term was later used in the Encyclopédie of Diderot and D'Alembert, published in Paris in 1751–1772, which contains an article on temperament written by Jean-Jacques Rousseau. The article discusses the contrasting merits of equal temperament and of an arrangement referred to as "temperament ordinaire", "temperament" (without qualifier), and also as "the common rule of temperament", and gives practical instructions how to tune a keyboard to this temperament.

In regard to the use of the expressions denoting the temperament in this article, it is noticeable that while all occurrences of the word temperament in the original article stand italicized, the accompanying words, including ordinaire, never are. That seems to show that Rousseau was using the phrase just to denote descriptively what he regarded as usual, rather than as a proper name or conventional designatory label.

As for the nature and identity of the temperament that Rousseau called the common one, the content of the article (see instructions reproduced below) leaves it clear that it was a circulating temperament, rather than the quarter-comma meantone referred to by Huygens about 60 years previously.

It is relevant to reproduce here the actual instructions from the Encyclopedie (in translation) for tuning to "the common rule of temperament", so as to leave it clear where they are specific, and where they are vague:

"To do this: 1st, start with the middle C of the keyboard, and narrow the first four fifths going up, until the fourth, E, makes a very true major third with the first note C; this is called the proof.

2nd, Continuing to tune by fifths, as soon as one has arrived at the sharp notes, one then widens the fifths – even though the thirds suffer by it – and one stops when one has arrived at G^{#}.

3rd, Return to C and tune the fifths going down, that is, F, B^{b}, and so on, widening them all the time, until one has arrived at D^{b}, which – when taken as C^{#} - ought to be in harmony as a fifth with the G^{#} where one stopped before.

The final fifths will be a little too wide, like the thirds. But the harshness will be tolerable if the tuning across the octaves is done properly, and besides, these fifths are so situated that they are rarely used."

Among the notable points of this description:

1: There is a possible misprint or similar thoughtless mistake, or else an instruction to cover some of the ground twice, in that the third-stage stopping point, D^{b}, would have been tuned already as C^{#} before the G^{#}, and so the expected stopping point of the third stage might more naturally be E^{b} / D^{#}, to be checked against the G^{#}. So D^{b} (re bemol) might have been a misprint etc. for E^{b} (mi bemol).

2: There might have been no need for the user to actually widen any of the fifths, if only the ones between C G D A E had been narrowed: things should have worked out if all the others had just been left pure. This highlights also that the instructions are not quite specific on what to do about the fifths E → B and B → F^{#} : To narrow them like the earlier ones? (which would necessitate some widening further along the chain), or to leave them pure? (in which case all the rest could be pure too). And then, how to distribute the amounts of any widening of the remaining fifths?

3: According to the degree of any widening used, some of the thirds would actually be made worse than necessary. This point seems possibly to have escaped the originators and users of the method described here, as of other methods involving widening fifths.

Perhaps it is possible to be too precise about this kind of thing.

Maybe the intent of an 18th-century description, such as the one referenced and discussed above, was that complete precision was not sought at all, rather to give a guideline for completion in practice, according to the taste and ear of the individual musician.

The two scales, both referred to as temperament ordinaire by Huygens and by Rousseau / Encyclopedie, have in common the degree of tempering applied to the fifths C G D A E . The difference between them is that the "wolf" error arising in the chain of fifths is either left whole in only one of those remaining fifths (meantone), or else divided up and distributed amongst them.

The two examples of usage given above do not seem to show any sign that the expression temperament ordinaire (in its 17th-18th century French usages) was anything more than a descriptive or denotative phrase, denoting whatever was to be referred to as 'the usual temperament'. The examples also make clear that other similar indicative words might equally be used instead, e.g. 'the common rule', or 'the one that everyone uses'. Some of the modern literature might seem to apply temperament ordinaire as if it is (or might have been, in the 17th or 18th century) a kind of proper name or conventional label of some particular tuning arrangement(s). Perhaps it is an open question whether this was ever so. The status that the phrase actually had at that time is relevant in turn to the substantive question of what actual tuning (or range of tunings) the phrase was then used to refer to. The examples above show, at least, that the temperament so referred to was not uniquely identified.

In summary, it seems that once the 18th century had got well under way, the expression temperament ordinaire could refer in the French literature to a circulating irregular keyboard temperament with some slightly widened fifths as well as some narrowed ones: Then in the late 17th century it could refer to what is now called quarter-comma meantone temperament. It seems not impossible that both uses might have been at some time concurrent.
