= François Couperin =

French composer (1668–1733)

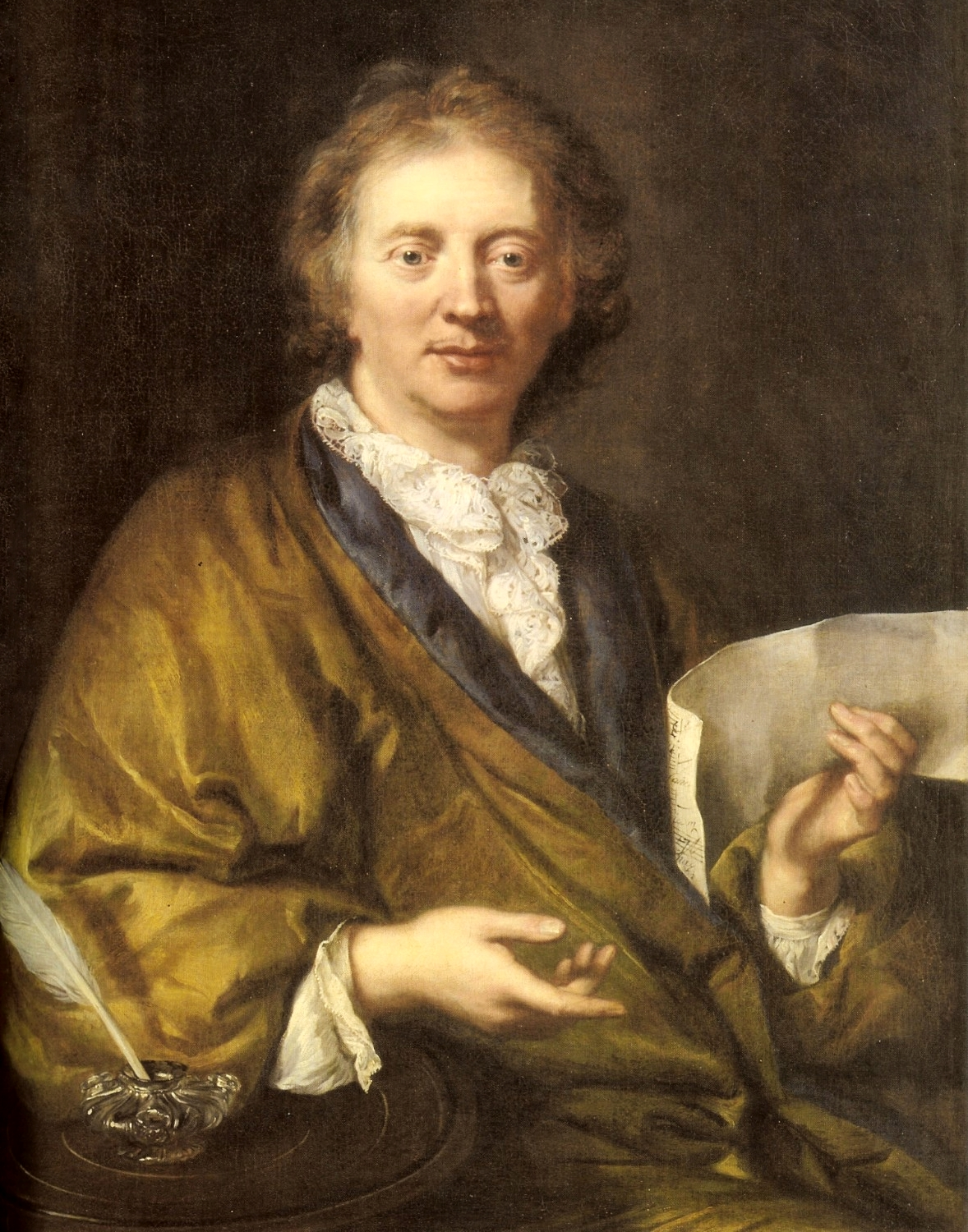
Couperin (anon.), collection of the Château de Versailles

François Couperin (French: [fʁɑ̃swa kupʁɛ̃]; 10 November 1668 – 11 September 1733) was a French Baroque composer, organist and harpsichordist. He was known as Couperin le Grand ("Couperin the Great") to distinguish him from other members of the musically talented Couperin family.

== Life ==
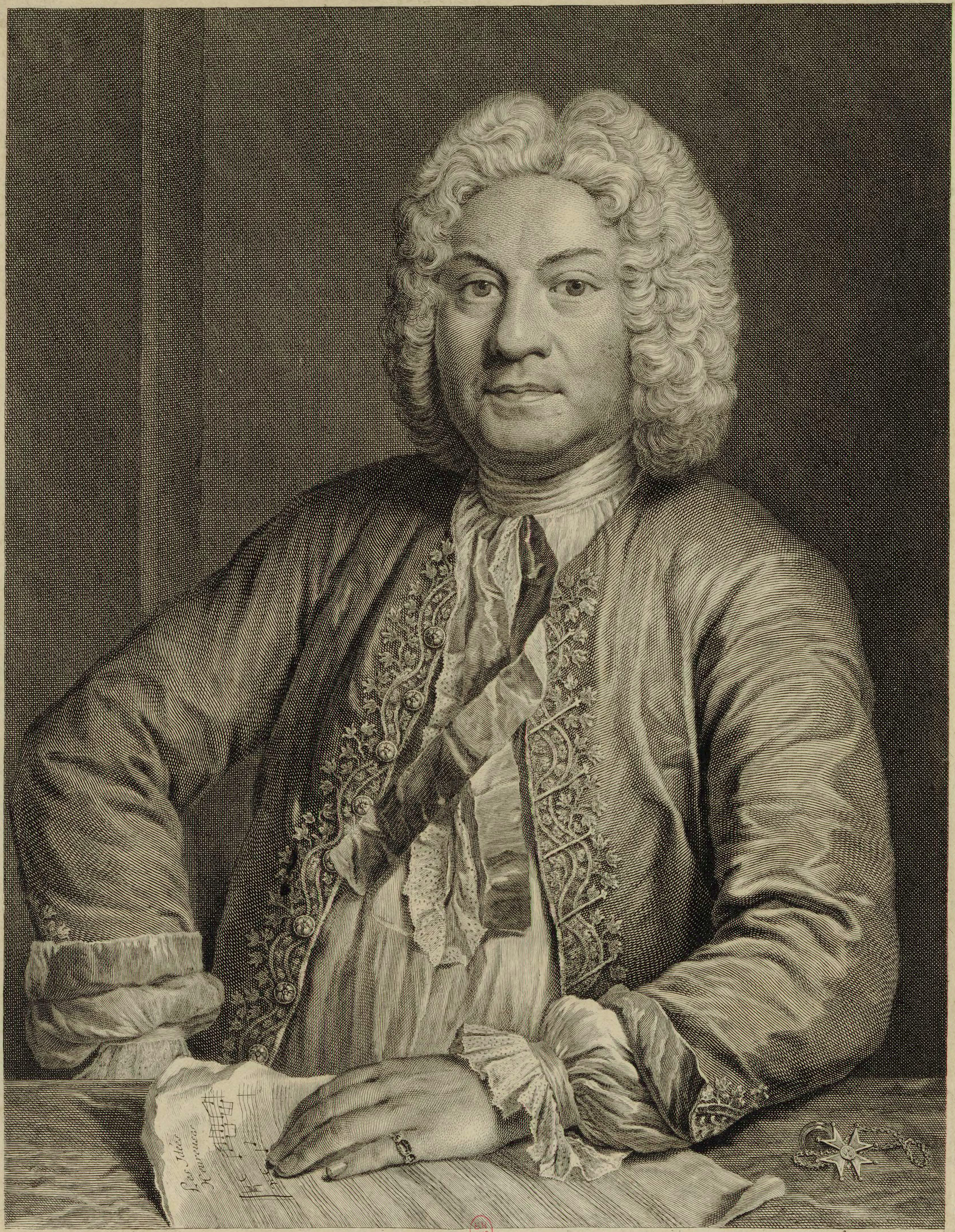
Couperin, engraving by Jean Jacques Flipart, 1735, after André Bouys.

Couperin was born in Paris, into a prominent musical family. His father Charles was organist at the Church of Saint-Gervais in the city, a position previously held by Charles's brother Louis Couperin, the esteemed keyboard virtuoso and composer whose career was cut short by an early death. As a boy François must have received his first music lessons from his father, but Charles died in 1679 leaving the position at Saint-Gervais to his son, a common practice known as survivance that few churches ignored. With their hands tied, the churchwardens at Saint-Gervais hired Michel Richard Delalande to serve as new organist on the understanding that François would replace him at age 18. However, it is likely Couperin began these duties much earlier: a stipend of 100 livres per year, which had been provided to Couperin on Charles's death slowly increased to 400 livres, suggesting that Couperin had gradually begun to take on the mantle as his studies progressed.

The 11-year-old was taken care of and taught, meanwhile, by organist Jacques-Denis Thomelin, who served both at court and at the church of Saint-Jacques-de-la-Boucherie. Biographer Évrard Titon du Tillet wrote that Thomelin treated the boy extremely well, becoming a second father to him. François' talent must have shown itself early on because by 1685 the church council began providing him a salary, although he had no contract.

At twenty-one Couperin also lost his mother, Marie (née Guérin), but otherwise his life and career were accompanied by good fortune. In 1689 he married Marie-Anne Ansault, daughter of a prosperous family. The next year saw the publication of his Pièces d'orgue, a collection of organ masses praised by Delalande, who may have assisted with the project. In three more years Couperin succeeded Thomelin at Louis XIV's court. The appointment brought him in touch with some of the finest composers of the day as well as the aristocracy. His earliest chamber music dates from this time. Couperin met his court duties in tandem with those he now had as organist at Saint-Gervais, while also composing.

=== Royal assent to publish ===
He applied for a blanket privilège du Roy in 1713 to allow him to publish 'plusiers pieces de musique de sa composition, tant pour la vocale que l'instrumental, conjointement ou séparément' and used it immediately to issue the first volume (out of four) of his harpsichord works, Pieces de clavecin. A harpsichord playing manual L'art de toucher le clavecin followed in 1716 (though this was immediately recalled and republished the following year), as well as other collections of keyboard and chamber music. In 1717 Couperin became ordinaire de la musique de la chambre du roi pour le clavecin––one of the highest possible appointments for a court musician, and a position once held by Jean-Henri d'Anglebert. However, his involvement in the musical activities at the court may have lessened after Louis XIV's death in 1715.

Couperin's health declined steadily throughout the 1720s. The services of a cousin were required by 1723 at Saint Gervais, and in 1730 Couperin's position as court harpsichordist was taken up by his daughter Marguerite-Antoinette. Couperin's final publications were Pièces de violes (1728) and the fourth volume of harpsichord pieces (1730). The composer died in 1733. The building where Couperin and his family lived since 1724 still stands and is located at the corner of the rue Radziwill and the rue des Petits Champs. The composer was survived by at least three of his children: Marguerite-Antoinette, who continued working as court harpsichordist until 1741, Marie-Madeleine (Marie-Cécile), who became a nun and may have worked as organist at the Maubuisson Abbey, and François-Laurent, who according to contemporary sources left the family after François died.

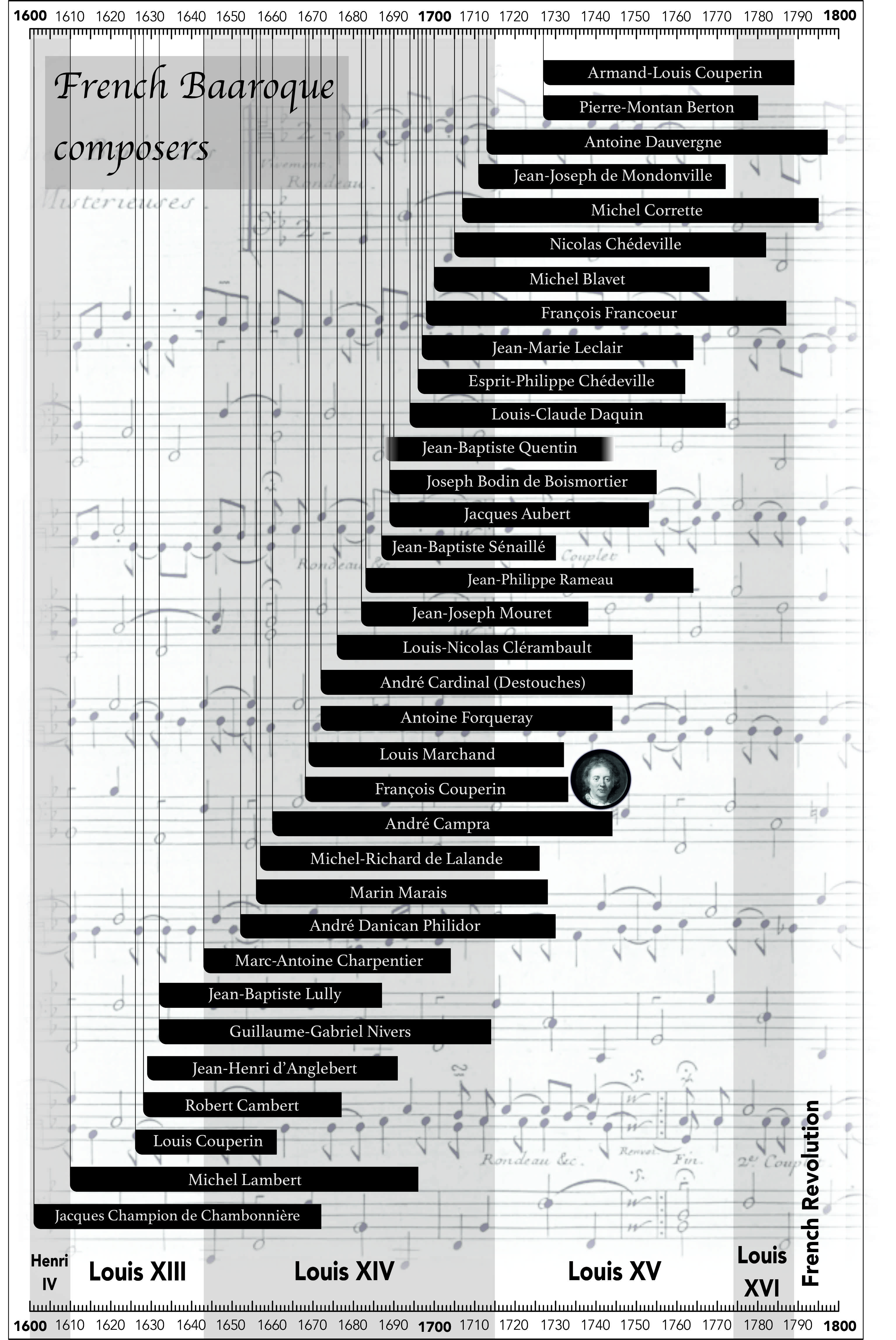
François Couperin in the timeline of French Baroque composers.

== Works ==
Cinquième prelude
from L'art de toucher le clavecin, performed by Robert Schröter on a harpsichord tuned in equal temperament

Cinquième prelude
The same work performed in a reconstructed tuning of "temperament ordinaire", which could have been used in France at Couperin's time

Sonade from Quatrième Ordre: La Piémontaise “L'Astrée” from Les Nations: Sonades et Suites de Simphonies en Trio (Paris, 1726)
Performed by New Comma Baroque

Pièces en concert – prelude, la tromba et air de diable
Performed by the Advent Chamber Orchestra with Stephen Balderston, cello solo

Plein jeu de la messe à l'usage des couvents
Premier couplet du Kyrie

Petit plein jeu de la messe à l'usage des couvents
Deo Gratias

Récit de cornet de la messe à l'usage des couvents
Premier couplet du Sanctus

Le réveille-matin (The Alarm Clock)
MIDI file

Couperin acknowledged his debt to the Italian composer Corelli. He introduced Corelli's trio sonata form to France. Couperin wrote two grand trio sonatas. The first, Le Parnasse, ou L'Apothéose de Corelli ("Parnassus, or the Apotheosis of Corelli"), was written to show his great debt to Corelli and published in 1724. The other, L'Apothéose de Lully, was published a year later and composed in honor of Jean-Baptiste Lully. It used both French and Italian styles of Baroque music, to reconcile the very different styles in what Couperin called a réunion des goûts (a reunion of tastes). The same year as L'Apothéose de Corelli was published, Couperin published a set of ten pieces, "Nouveaux concerts, ou Les goûts réunis", that also combined these two different styles of Baroque music.

His most famous book, L'art de toucher le clavecin ("The Art of Harpsichord Playing", published in 1716), contains suggestions for fingerings, touch, ornamentation and other features of keyboard technique, as well as eight preludes in the keys of the pieces in his first two books of harpsichord music and an Allemande to illustrate the Italianate style.

Couperin's four volumes of harpsichord music, published in Paris in 1713, 1717, 1722, and 1730, contain over 230 individual pieces, and he also published a book of Concerts Royaux which can be played as solo harpsichord pieces or as small chamber works. The four collections for harpsichord alone are grouped into ordres, a synonym of suites, containing traditional dances as well as pieces with descriptive titles. They are notable for Couperin's detailed indication of ornaments, which in most harpsichord music of the period was left to the discretion of the player. The first and last pieces in an ordre were of the same tonality, but the middle pieces could be in other closely related tonalities. These volumes were admired by Johann Sebastian Bach, who exchanged letters with Couperin, and later by Brahms and by Ravel, the latter of whom memorialized the composer in Le Tombeau de Couperin (Couperin's Memorial).

Many of Couperin's keyboard pieces have evocative, picturesque titles (such as "The little windmills" and "The mysterious barricades") and express a mood through key choices, adventurous harmonies and (resolved) discords. They have been likened to miniature tone poems. These features attracted Richard Strauss, who orchestrated some of them.

Johannes Brahms's piano music was influenced by the keyboard music of Couperin. Brahms performed Couperin's music in public and contributed to an edition of Couperin's Pièces de clavecin by Friedrich Chrysander in the 1880s.

Modern English composer Thomas Adès took three pieces from different sets of Couperin suites and orchestrated them in his work "Three Studies from Couperin".

The early-music expert Jordi Savall has written that Couperin was the "poet musician par excellence", who believed in "the ability of Music [with a capital M] to express itself in prose and poetry", and that "if we enter into the poetry of music we discover that it carries grace that is more beautiful than beauty itself".

=== Organ ===
Only one collection of organ music by Couperin survives, the Pièces d'orgue consistantes en deux messes ("Pieces for Organ Consisting of Two Masses"), which were published in November 1690. At the age of 21, Couperin probably had neither the funds nor the reputation to obtain widespread publication and the masses were released as manuscripts, with a printed title page and approbation by his teacher, Michel Richard Delalande, who wrote that the music was "very beautiful and worthy of being given to the public." The two masses were intended for different audiences: the first for parishes or secular churches ("paroisses pour les fêtes solemnelles"), and the second for convents or abbey churches ("couvents de religieux et religieuses"). These masses are divided into many movements in accordance with the traditional structure of the Latin Mass: Kyrie (5 movements), Gloria (9), Sanctus (3), Agnus (2), and an additional Offertoire and Deo gratias to conclude each mass.

Couperin followed techniques used in masses by Nivers, Lebègue, and Boyvin, as well as other predecessors of the French Baroque era. In the paroisses Mass, he uses plainchant from the Missa cunctipotens genitor Deus as a cantus firmus in two Kyrie movements and in the first Sanctus movement; the Kyrie Fugue subject is also derived from a chant incipit. The Mass for couvents contains no plainchant, as each convent and monastery maintained its own, non-standard body of chant. Couperin departs from his predecessors in many ways. For example, the melodies of the Récits are strictly rhythmic and more directional than previous examples of the genre. Willi Apel wrote, "this music shows a sense of natural order, a vitality, and an immediacy of feeling that breaks into French organ music like a fresh wind."

The longest piece in the collection is the Offertoire sur les grands jeux of the first Mass, which is akin to an expanded French overture in three large sections: a prelude, a chromatic fugue in G minor, and a gigue-like fugue. Bruce Gustafson has called the movement a "stunning masterpiece of the French classic repertory." The second Mass also contains an Offertoire with a similar form, but this Mass is not considered as masterly as the first: Apel wrote, "In general, [Couperin] did not expend the same care for this Mass, which was written for modest abbey churches, as for the other one, which he himself certainly presented on important holidays on the organ of Saint-Gervais."

== See also ==
- French organ school
