= Jean-Patrice Brosse =

French musician and organist (1950–2021)

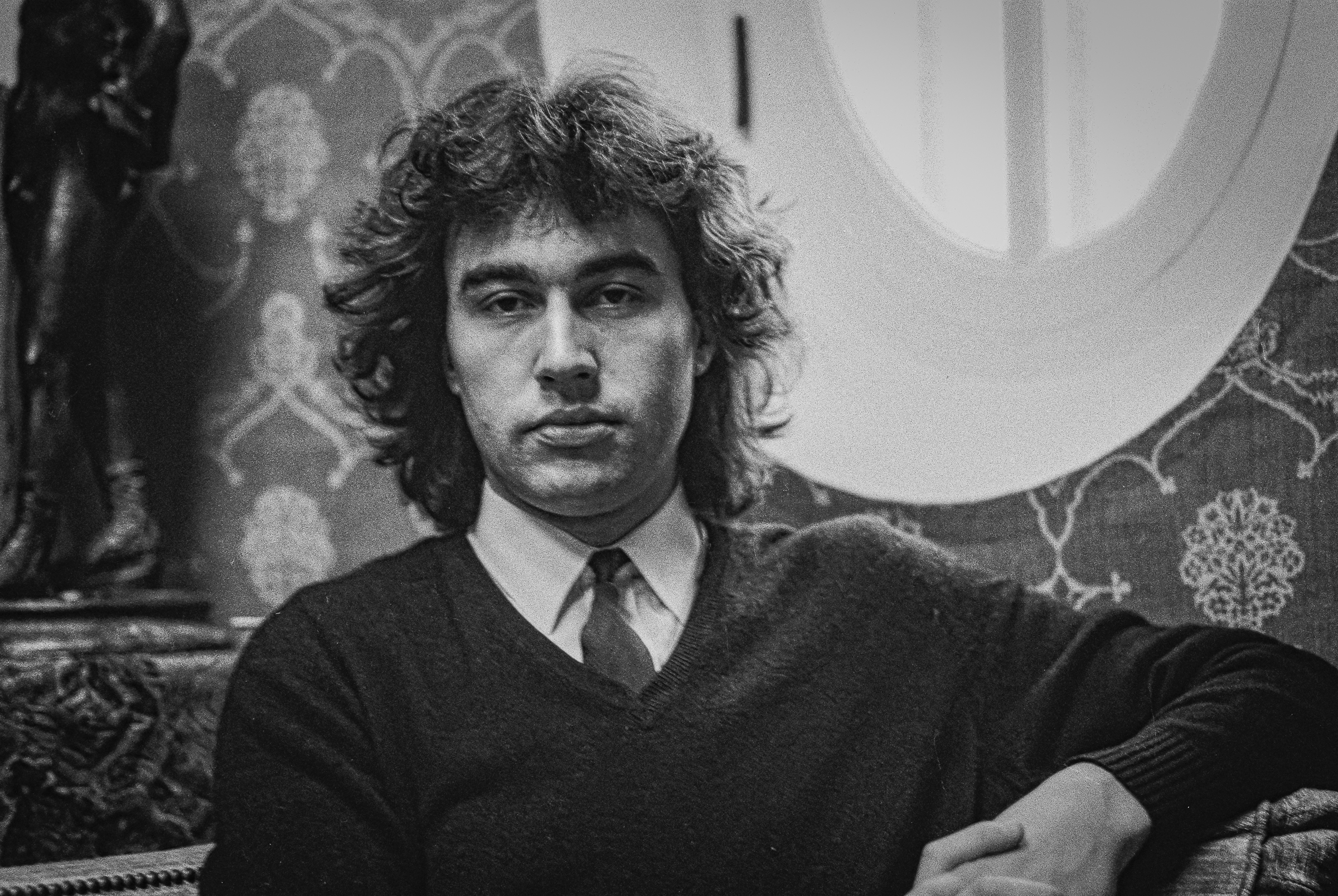
Brosse by Claude Truong-Ngoc (1981)

Jean-Patrice Bernard Simon Brosse (23 June 1950 – 18 September 2021) was a French harpsichordist and organist.

== Biography ==
Born in Le Mans on 23 June 1950, Brosse gradually followed a complete artistic training at the conservatory of Le Mans (harpsichord with Françoise Petit, organ, chamber music, writing, conducting), Conservatoire de Paris, the Accademia Musicale Chigiana, and the École nationale supérieure des beaux-arts of Paris (in architecture).

At twenty-three, after a major tour of chamber music concerts in the US and South America, he became organist and harpsichordist of the Ars Antiqua ensemble of Paris, the Ensemble polyphonique (conducted by Charles Ravier) and the Orchestre de la Radio, then the Orchestre de chambre de Paris and the Orchestre de chambre de Toulouse (for the EMI recordings). He was then the appreciated partner of great interpreters such as Henryk Szeryng, Jean-Pierre Wallez, Jean-Pierre Rampal, Maurice André, Frédéric Lodéon, Arto Noras... and accompanied singers such as Gundula Janowitz, Rita Streich, Hugues Cuénod, Isabel Garcisanz, Derek Lee Ragin, Michel Sénéchal and Cecilia Bartoli.

He participated in the activities of the Jeunesses musicales de France, for which he gave numerous concerts, and then recorded his first records as soloist: complete works by Henry Purcell, Clérambault and Jacques Duphly EMI, Bach's sonatas with Jean-Pierre Wallez at IPG (later reissued by Universal). He played the great orchestral works: Poulenc's Concertos for harpsichord and organ, Camille Saint-Saëns's Symphony with organ, Manuel de Falla's and Frank Martin's Concertos, Sauguet's Church sonata... with the biggest ensembles: Monte-Carlo, RAI, National et Philharmonique de Radio-France, Orchestre national des Pays de la Loire, Capitole de Toulouse..., under the direction of Georges Prêtre (with whom he recorded Poulenc's Concert Champêtre for EMI), Emmanuel Krivine, Jean-Pierre Marty, Marek Janowski, Michel Plasson... Henri Sauguet wrote his Church sonata to him (issued by Arion), Jean-Michel Damase's Pastorales for organ, Joaquin Nin-Culmell's Symphonie des Mystères...

Deepening the study of baroque treaties and instruments, he founded the Concerto Rococo (with Alice Piérot and Paul Carlioz), a small group of early instruments dedicated to the 18th century harpsichord and concert organ repertoire (Bach, Johann Schobert, Claude Balbastre, Michel Corrette, Mozart, Soler, Haydn...). Through his musicological research, Jean-Patrice Brosse also worked on the restitution of baroque religious services alternating organ and Gregorian chant. (Messe Agatange, Messe de Bordeaux, Vœu de Louis XIII...), and ensured the revision of old works at Éditions J. M. Fuzeau (Johann Schobert, Antonio Soler etc.).

A recitalist, concertist, chamber musician, he was regularly invited to the great French festivals: Festival de musique de La Chaise-Dieu, Sully, Septembre musical de l'Orne, Saou, Saint-Riquier, Lessay, the Nuits musicales du Suquet, Printemps des arts de Monte-Carlo, Prades, Centre baroque de Versailles, Orangerie de Sceaux, Avignon, Aix, Art sacré de Paris, Toulouse les Orgues, Printemps des Arts de Nantes, Radio-France-Montpellier, Albi, Nuits d’Uzès, Festival baroque de Pontoise, Mai de Bordeaux, Saint-Lizier, Comminges, Maguelone, Déodat de Séverac à Saint-Félix-Lauragais, Bourges, La Rochelle, Dijon... He performed in most European countries, in the US, in South America, in the Far East, in tours - often illustrated with lectures and master classes - or in prestigious festivals: Echternach, Brussels, Antwerp, Frankfurt, Berlin, Dresden, Bonn, Düsseldorf, Amsterdam, Rotterdam, The Hague, Vienna, Budapest, Belgrade, Zagreb, Warsaw, Istanbul, Madrid, Milan, Naples, Hong Kong.

Brosse made a series of recordings dedicated to the Parisian harpsichordists of the Enlightenment era (Michel Corrette, Claude Balbastre, Armand-Louis Couperin, Joseph Nicolas Pancrace Royer, Simon Simon, Jacques Duphly...), in parallel with the work he wrote on this subject, Le Clavecin des Lumières for Bleu nuit publisher. He is also the author of Le clavecin du Roi Soleil. The musical and literary richness of this period inspired him to create a poetic evocation, "Le Soir des Lumières", which he shared on stage with the actress Françoise Fabian, as well as a series of concerts-readings Mozart et le clavecin des Lumières and Les derniers jours du Roi Soleil after Saint-Simon's Mémoires. With Marie-Christine Barrault, he also conceived a series of poetic and musical shows around works ranging from the Renaissance to the present day.

His eclectic tastes also made him approach the repertoire of the romantic and contemporary organ. Artistic director of the Festival international de musique du Comminges, he was honorary professor of baroque organ and harpsichord at the École normale de musique de Paris.

Jean-Patrice Brosse's independent spirit and personal style are reflected in his writings on music and fine arts, as well as in the sixty or so recordings he made for EMI, Virgin, Universal, Arion, Vérany... whose originality has been supported several times by the Société civile pour l'administration des droits des artistes et musiciens interprètes and awarded Grand Prix record awards and nominations at the Victoires de la musique.

Jean-Patrice Brosse held the rank of chevalier of the Ordre des Arts et des Lettres.

Brosse died on 18 September 2021 at the age of 71 due to a cancer.

== Discography ==
Arion:

- Nicolas Lebègue:
  - Premier Livre d'orgue (July 1981, Arion ARN268561) OCLC 658332068
  - Troisième livre d’orgue 2 CDs 1982
- L’Orgue français à la Renaissance 1983
- Claude Balbastre: Noëls pour orgue 1983
- Mélodies espagnoles (with Isabel Garcisanz) 1984
- Henri Sauguet: Sonate d’église (dir. J.W. Audoli) 1988
- Mozart : Church sonatas (with the Concerto Rococo) 2002

EMI :

- Louis-Nicolas Clérambault: L’œuvre d’orgue et de clavecin 1978
- Henry Purcell: L’œuvre d’orgue et de clavecin 2 CD 1979
- Jacques Duphly: L’œuvre de clavecin 3 CD 1980
- Francis Poulenc: Concert Champêtre pour clavecin et orchestre (dir. Georges Prêtre) 1984

Saphir:

- Bach: Toccatas, Fantaisies, Préludes and fugues 2008

Triton:

- Messe de Bordeaux (with the Vox Cantoris choir) 2007

Universal:

- Bach: 6 Sonatas for violin and harpsichord (with Jean-Pierre Wallez) 2000

Verany:

- Batailles à Versailles 1986
- Le Concert des oiseaux à Versailles 1986
- Le Clavecin au siècle de Louis XIV 1987
- Le Siècle d’or du clavecin 1987
- Le Clavecin au siècle des Lumières 1987
- Bach: Les Concertos pour orgue 1987
- Bach: Grandes œuvres pour orgue 1987
- Le Clavecin à la fin de l’Ancien Régime 1989
- Bach: La Clavierübung III 1990
- Johann Schobert: Trios (with the Concerto Rococo) 1991
- Schobert: Quatuors (with the Concerto Rococo) 1992
- Michel Corrette : Concertos pour orgue (with the Concerto Rococo) 1993
- Bach: Variations canoniques et Partitas pour orgue 1993
- Claude Balbastre: Quatuors (with the Concerto Rococo) 1994
- Jean-François Dandrieu : Messe et Vêpres de Pâques (Chœur grégorien de Paris) 1994
- François d'Agincourt: Messe de l’Assomption (with the Chœur Antiphona) 1996
- Dandrieu: Vêpres de l’Assomption (with the Chœur Antiphona) 1996
- Mathieu Lanes : Messe Agatange (with the Antiphona and the Concerto Rococo) 1998
- Soler: Quintettes pour clavecin et cordes (2 CD) (Concerto Rococo) 1999
- Balbastre: Livre de clavecin 1999
- Michel Corrette: Livre de clavecin 2001
- Armand-Louis Couperin: Livre de clavecin 2001
- Pancrace Royer: Livre de clavecin 2003
- Jacques Duphly: Les quatre livres de clavecin 2004
- Simon Simon: Livre de clavecin 2006
- Balbastre: Pièces de clavecin manuscrites 2006
- Corrette: Les Amusements de Parnasse II et III 2007

Virgin:

- François Couperin : Messe des paroisses, messe des couvents 2 CD 1996

== Fac-simile editions ==
- Johann Schobert: Sonatas op. I, II, II, XVII (Fuzeau)
- Johann Schobert: Sonatas en quatuor op. VII (Fuzeau)
- Soler: 6 Quintets for Harpsichord and Strings (Fuzeau)
