= Alice Piérot =

French musician

Alice Piérot is a French Baroque violinist.

== Biography ==
Piérot studied music at the Conservatoire de Lyon. In 1988, she turned to baroque music and became concertmaster of Marc Minkowski's orchestra, Les Musiciens du Louvre and recorded operas by Rameau, Mondonville and Marais... (issued by Erato).

She also makes recordings with Jean-Patrice Brosse's ensemble Concerto Rococo, for the Pierre Verany label (Schobert) and Florence Malgoire's Les Nièces de Rameau (CPE Bach, Rameau, Purcell).

As chamber musician, she participates as a guest in the Amarillis ensemblme (Rameau, Antoine Dauvergne) and founds and directs Les Veilleurs de nuit; She is also a member of the Anpapié string trio (with Fanny Paccoud, viola and Elena Andreyev, cello) since its foundation in 2002 and plays in duet with the piano-fortist Aline Zylberajch.

In 2002, she recorded Heinrich Biber's Rosary Sonatas for the Alpha label, a disc which won a Diapason d'or of the year 2003.

In 2004, she entered as first violin in Hervé Niquet's Consert spirituel ensemble and is a soloist at Le Parlement de Musique directed by Martin Gester.

Piérot teaches the Baroque violin and an orchestra class at the Aix-en-Provence conservatory. Béatrice Linon is one of her pupils.

In 2002 Alice Piérot invested a former factory near Avignon and transformed it into a vast musical vessel, La Courroie, which now hosts concerts, residencies, creations and recordings, experimenting with new forms of dissemination and practice of music, from the oldest to the most contemporary.

== Discography ==
In particular, she recorded for the Zig-zag territoires, Opus 111, Verany, Accord and Alpha labels.

- Bach's Six Sonatas for Violin and Harpsichord, BWV 1014–1019 – Martin Gester, organ (9-13 September 1993, 2CDs Decca/Accord 205322)
- CPE Bach, Sanguineus et Melancholicus: Sonates en trio Wq 146, 147, 148, 161 – Les Nièces de Rameau: Florence Malgoire, violin; Alice Piérot, violin; Marianne Muller, viol; Aline Zylberajch, harpsichord (21–25 October 2002, Zig Zag Territoires ZZT 030701) OCLC 658983297
- CPE Bach, Testament et Promesses – Aline Zylberajch (2012, L’Encelade) OCLC 906718020
- Heinrich Biber – Les Veilleurs de Nuit: Alice Piérot, violin and conducting; Marianne Müller, viol; Pascal Monteilhet, theorbo; Elisabeth Geiger, claviorganum (2003, Alpha) OCLC 57027832
- Blondeau's Quatuors d'après les sonates de Beethoven – Ad Fontes Quartet: Alice Piérot and Enrico Parizzi, violins; Monica Ehrsam, viola; Reto Cuonz, cello (February 2004, Alpha) OCLC 62304086
- Leclair, Récréations de musique pour 2 violons & basse continue – Les Nièces de Rameau: Marianne Muller, Florence Malgoire, Claire Giardelli, Aline Zylberach (1993, Verany PV 794 001)
- Purcell, Trio Sonatas in three & four parts – Les Nièces de Rameau: Florence Malgoire, Alice Piérot, Claire Giardelli, Marianne Muller, Aline Zylberajch (1995, Verany)
- Rameau, Concert harpsichord pieces – Les Nièces de Rameau: Florence Malgoire and Alice Piérot (violins); Marianne Muller (viol); Aline Zylberajch (harpsichord) (23-25 February 1998, Accord) OCLC 492047896
- Schobert, Trios with harpsichord – Jean-Patrice Brosse, harpsichord (13-14 December 1990, Verany PV 791042)

=== With the Amarillis ensemble ===
- 2011: Ferveur et Extase – Stéphanie d'Oustrac, mezzo-soprano; Amarillis; Héloïse Gaillard, Violaine Cochard (20-23 September 2010, Ambronay Editions) OCLC 942667394
- 2014: Jean-Philippe Rameau: Cantates and Pièces de clavecin en concert – Mathias Vidal, tenor; Ensemble Amarillis: Héloïse Gaillard, baroque oboe and recorder; Violaine Cochard, harpsichord; Alice Piérot, violin; Marianne Muller, viol (Naïve Records) OCLC 892635219
- 2015: Antoine Dauvergne & Gérard Pesson – Les Troqueurs and La Double Coquette – Jaël Azzaretti, Isabelle Poulenard; Héloïse Gaillard (December 2015, 2CD NoMadMusic) OCLC 930922468
- 2016: Pergolesi's Stabat Mater – Sonya Yoncheva (soprano) and Karine Deshayes (contralto); Amarillis: Héloïse Gaillard (recorder), Violaine Cochard (harpsichord & positive organ), Alice Piérot (first violin), Sandrine Dupé, Louis Créac'h (violins I), Olivier Briand, Diana Lee, Koji Yoda (violins II), Fanny Paccoud, Laurent Muller (violas), Annabelle Luis, Frédéric Baldassare (cellos), Gautier Blondel (doublebasse), Bruno Helstroffer (theorbo). (Sony classical 88985369642)
- 2017: Effervescence concertante – Amarillis: Héloïse Gaillard (recorder et hautbois baroque), Violaine Cochard (harpsichord), Amélie Michel (traverso), Meillane Wilmotte (recorder and traverso), Alice Piérot (concertante violin), David Plantier (violin I), Alix Boivert (violin II and viola), Laurent Muller-Poblocki (alto), Annabelle Luis (cello), Ludovic Coutineau (doublebasse). (Evidence Classics EVCD 032)
- 2018: "Handel – Melodies in Mind" – Amarillis: Héloïse Gaillard (recorder), Alice Piérot (violin), Annabelle Luis (cello), Violaine Cochard (harpsichord), Florent Marie (theorbe). Evidence Classics)
