= Aline Zylberajch =

French harpsichordist

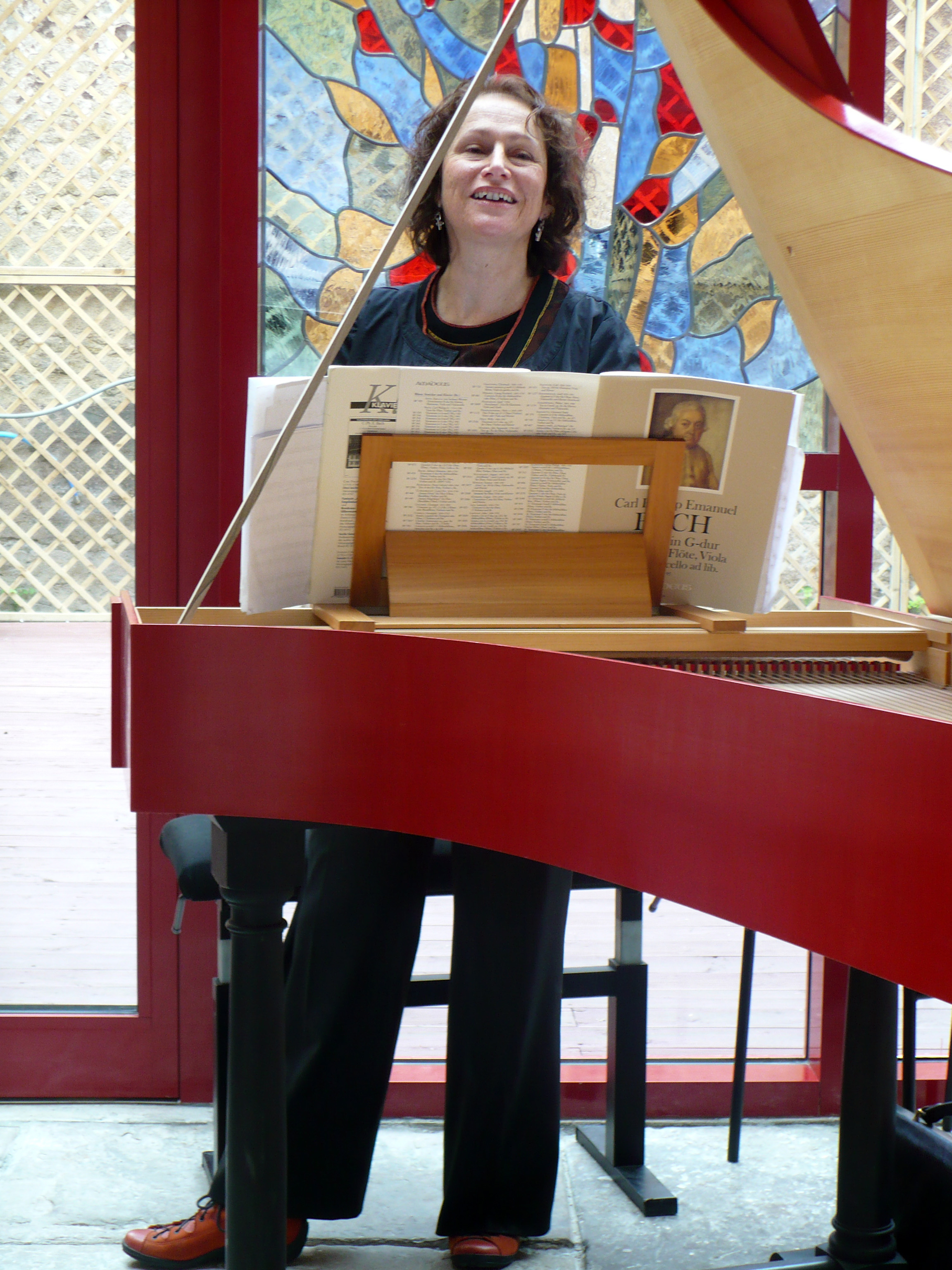
Aline Zylberajch in 2009

Aline Zylberajch is a French harpsichordist, teacher and musicologist, also playing the organ and the piano-forte.

== Biography ==
Zylberajch studied music at the Conservatoire de Paris with Robert Veyron-Lacroix, Claude Ballif (analysis) and Norbert Dufourcq (history of music) and at the New England Conservatory of Music in Boston.

She then participated in the productions of several baroque ensembles such as Philippe Herreweghe's La Chapelle Royale, Marc Minkowski's Les Musiciens du Louvre, Martin Gester's Le Parlement de musique, an ensemble based in Strasbourg.

She teaches harpsichord in Strasbourg, at the Académie Supérieure de musique and harpsichord didactics at the Department of Pedagogy of the Conservatoire de Paris.

Among her pupils were Francis Jacob and Johann Vexo.

== Discography ==
- C. P. E. Bach: Sonates Prussiennes, Wq.48 (Ligia Digital Lidi 0101005-93)
- Scarlatti: Una nuova inventione per Maria Barbara - copie de piano-forte after Cristofori (2005, Ambronay Editions AMY002)
- Autour d'un manuscrit redécouvert, Suites de Froberger - performed on the Ruckers harpsichord of the Musée Unterlinden de Colmar (Assai 222102)
- Le Portrait de l'Amour, pieces by François Couperin - Ruckers-Taskin playing the harpsichord of the Musée de la Musique de Paris (Assai 222422)

Four-hands

- A due cembali, Caprices, pieces for two keyboards: Soler, Haydn, Schobert, Mozart, Planyavsky and others - Aline Zylberajch and Martin Gester, harpsichords and organ of the St. Walburga Abbey (7-9 September 2011, K 617 K617233) BnF 42565552p
- Wolfgang Amadeus Mozart, Large works with four hands - Martin Gester (K617 Editions K617244)

Chamber music

- Purcell's Trio Sonatas with three & four parts - Les Nièces de Rameau: Florence Malgoire, Alice Piérot, Claire Giardelli, Marianne Muller, Aline Zylberajch (1995, Verany)
- C. P. E. Bach's Testament et Promesses / Sonates and fantaisies on Tangentenflügel - Alice Pierot (2012, L'Encelade ECL1201) OCLC 906718020
- C. P. E. Bach's Chamber Music. Quartets for pianoforte, flute, viola and cello (NoMAdMusic NMM012)
- Psalterion and Fortepiano, C. P. E. Bach, Mozart, Schobert - with Margit Übellacker (Ambronay Editions AMY012)
- Rameau, harpsichord pieces in concerts, with Les Nièces de Rameau (Accord 206592)
- C. P. E. Bach: Sanguineus et Melancholicus: Trio Sonatas Wq 146, 147, 148, 161 - Les Nièces de Rameau: Florence Malgoire, violin; Alice Piérot, violin; Marianne Muller, viol; Aline Zylberajch, harpsichord (21-25 October 2002, Zig Zag Territoires ZZT 030701). OCLC 658983297

Accompanist

- Haydn's Ariana a Naxos, Lieder et Canzonettas - Stéphanie d'Oustrac (Ambronay Editions AMY023)
- Le Salon sensible: Haydn, Mozart - Jill Feldman, soprano; Aline Zylberajch, piano-forte (29 April 1987, Still Editions 2904CCS87) BnF 38133943r
- Schubert: Die schöne Müllerin (February 1997, Accord 206072) BnF 38512200k
