= Édouard Pingret =

French painter and lithographer

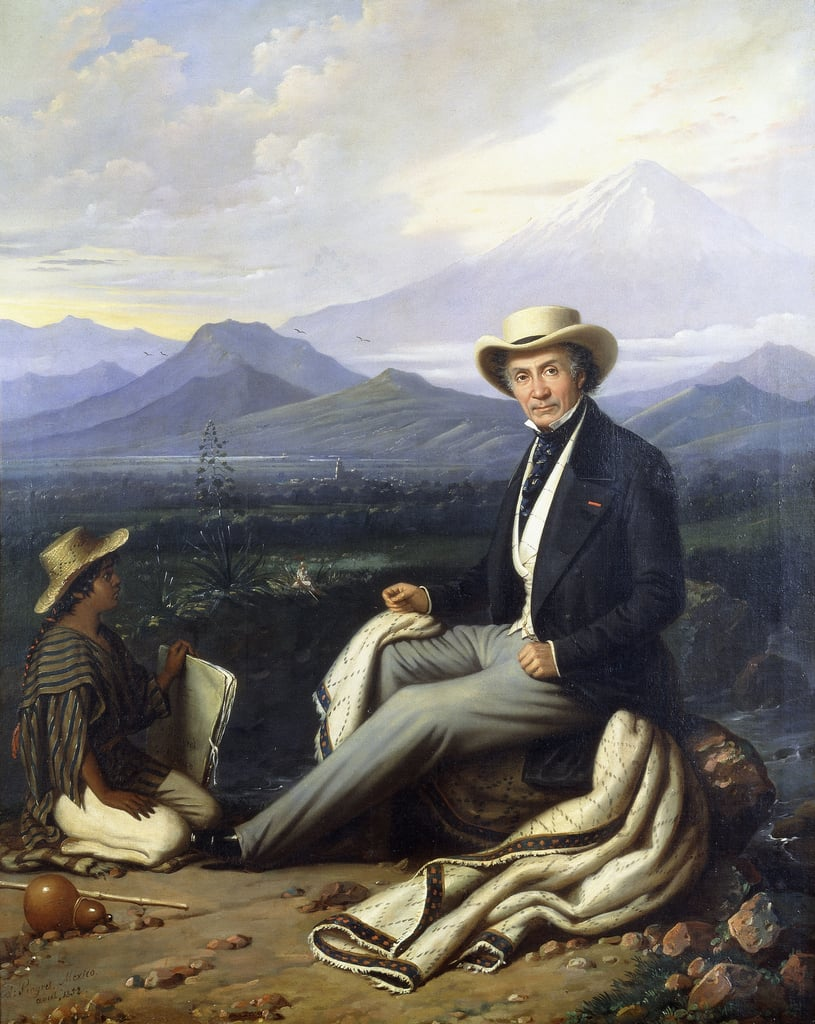
Self-Portrait in a Mexican Landscape (1854)

Édouard-Henri-Théophile Pingret (30 December 1788 – 1875) was a French painter and lithographer.

== Life ==
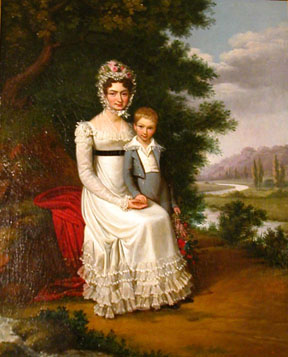
Mother and Son, Pingret 1821

He was born at Saint-Quentin, Aisne, the son of a middle-class family in a mainly agricultural region, but also home to the celebrated General Cambronne and to illustrious notaries and Normandy judges. Pingret's father, Henri Pingret Jullien, was related to the highest spheres of the Protestant aristocracy, and took up the practice of law in 1781. During the French Revolution, his father was named a representative of the Department of Aisne at the Revolutionary Convention, which required him to maintain a secondary residence in the capital of France, Paris.

Pingret studied under painter Jacques-Louis David as well as Jean-Baptiste Regnault; studied also at the Academy of Saint Luke in Rome. He exhibited in Paris salons from 1810 onward. Was appointed a Chevalier of the Legion of Honor, 1831. From 1850 to 1855 he lived and worked in Mexico City, exhibiting annually at the Academia de Bellas Artes. He produced outstanding portraits, including those of Emperor Napoleon Bonaparte (1808) in France and General Mariano Arista (1851; Mexico City, Mus. N. Hist.). His most important works in Mexico were costumbrista genre scenes. He died in his home town of Saint-Quentin.

== Works ==
He was also an illustrator of monographs such as "Voyage de S.M. Louis-Philippe Ier Roi des Francais au Chateau de Windsor. Dedie A S. M. Victoria, Reine d'Angleterre." Ed. Pingret, Paris and Ackermann, London, 1846. Large folio, with 25 lithographed plates, some tinted. A fine example of his portrait work can be found in the collection of the Yuko Nii Foundation in Brooklyn, New York. A painting titled Reading A Letter by Pingret is in the collection of the Raclin Murphy Museum of Art at Notre Dame University in South Bend, Indiana.

== Gallery ==
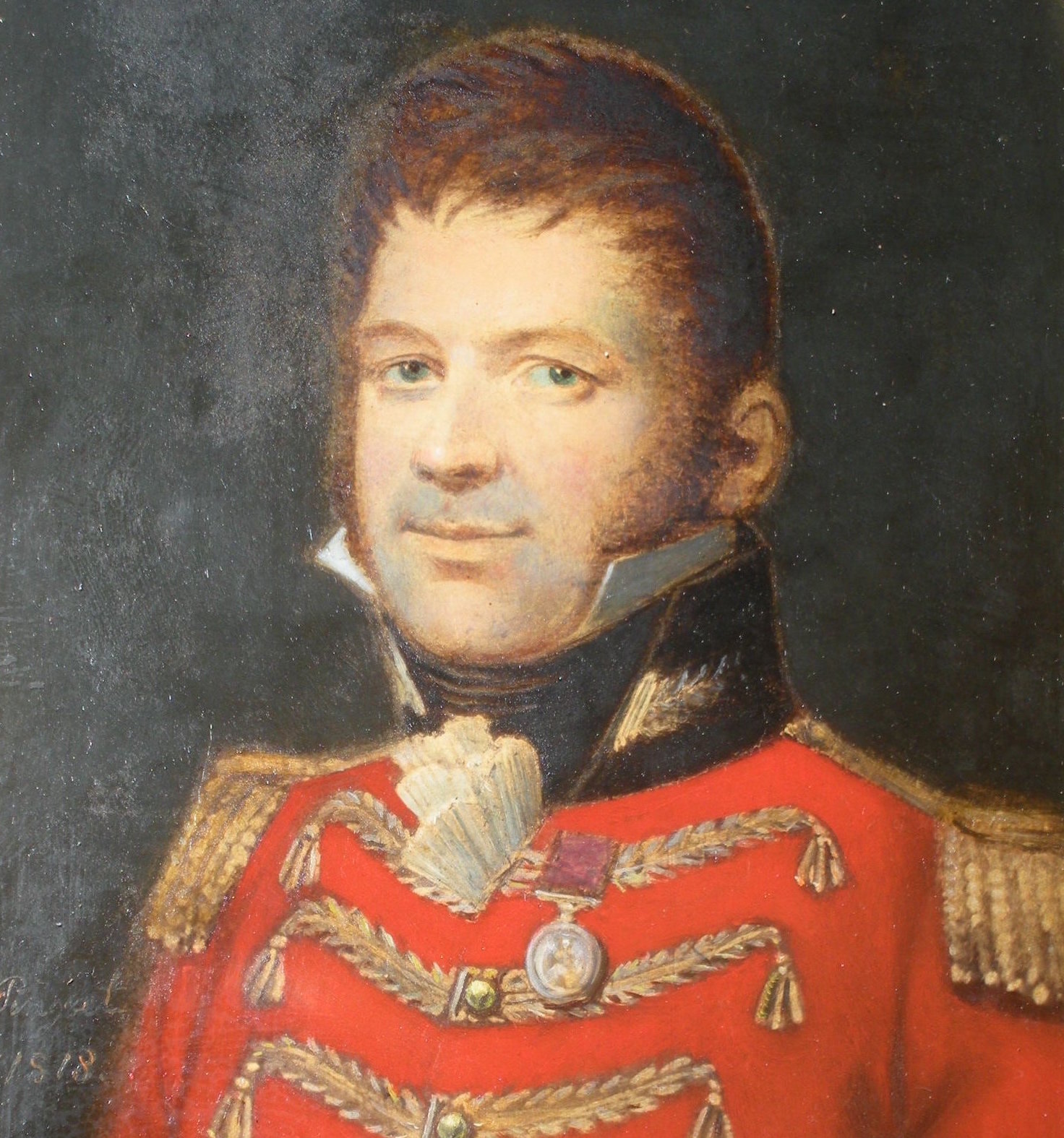
Portrait of British politician Lord Charles Fitzroy, 1818

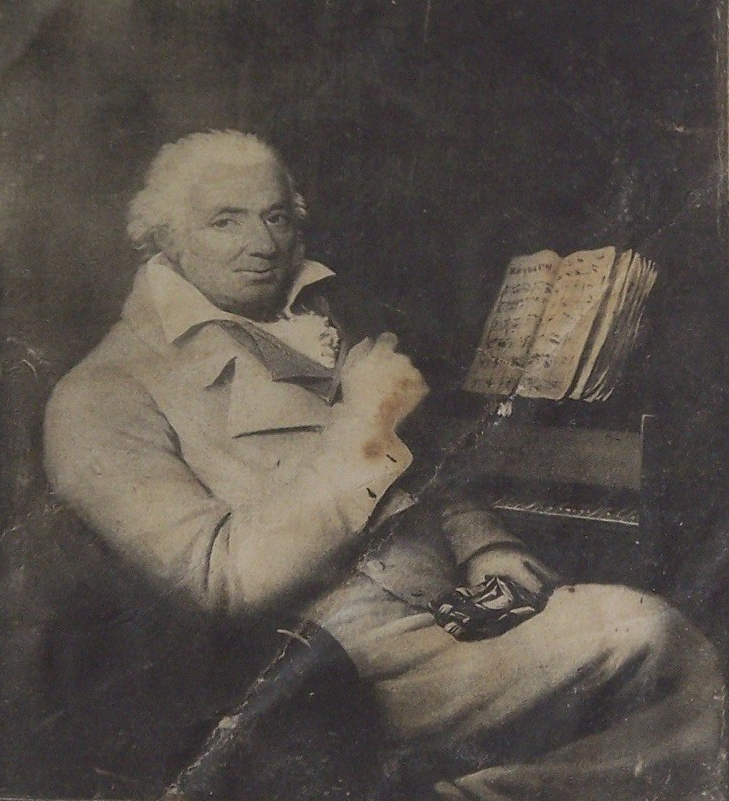
Portrait of French composer Bernard Jumentier, 1823

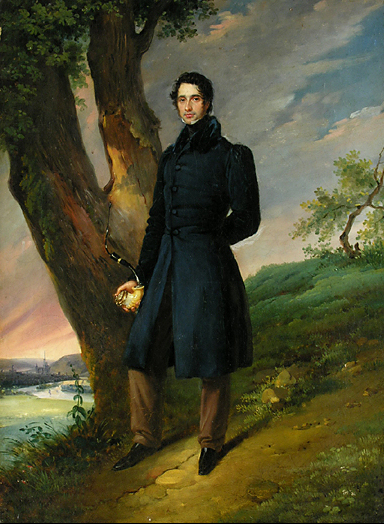
Portrait Eines Mannes mit Meerschaumpfeife (lit. 'Portrait of a Man with a Meerschaum Pipe'), 1828

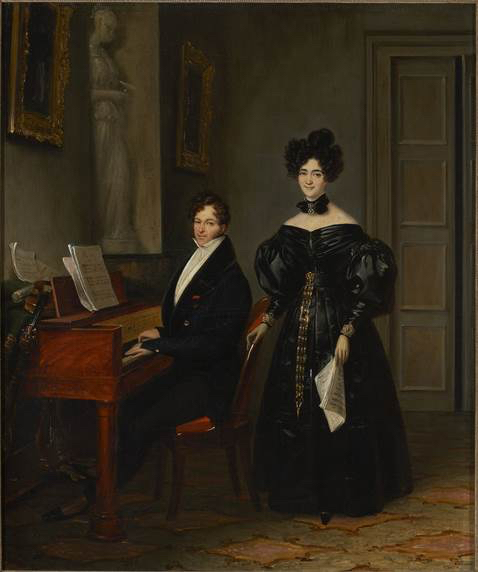
François-Adrien Boieldieu et Jenny Philis-Bertin, 1830

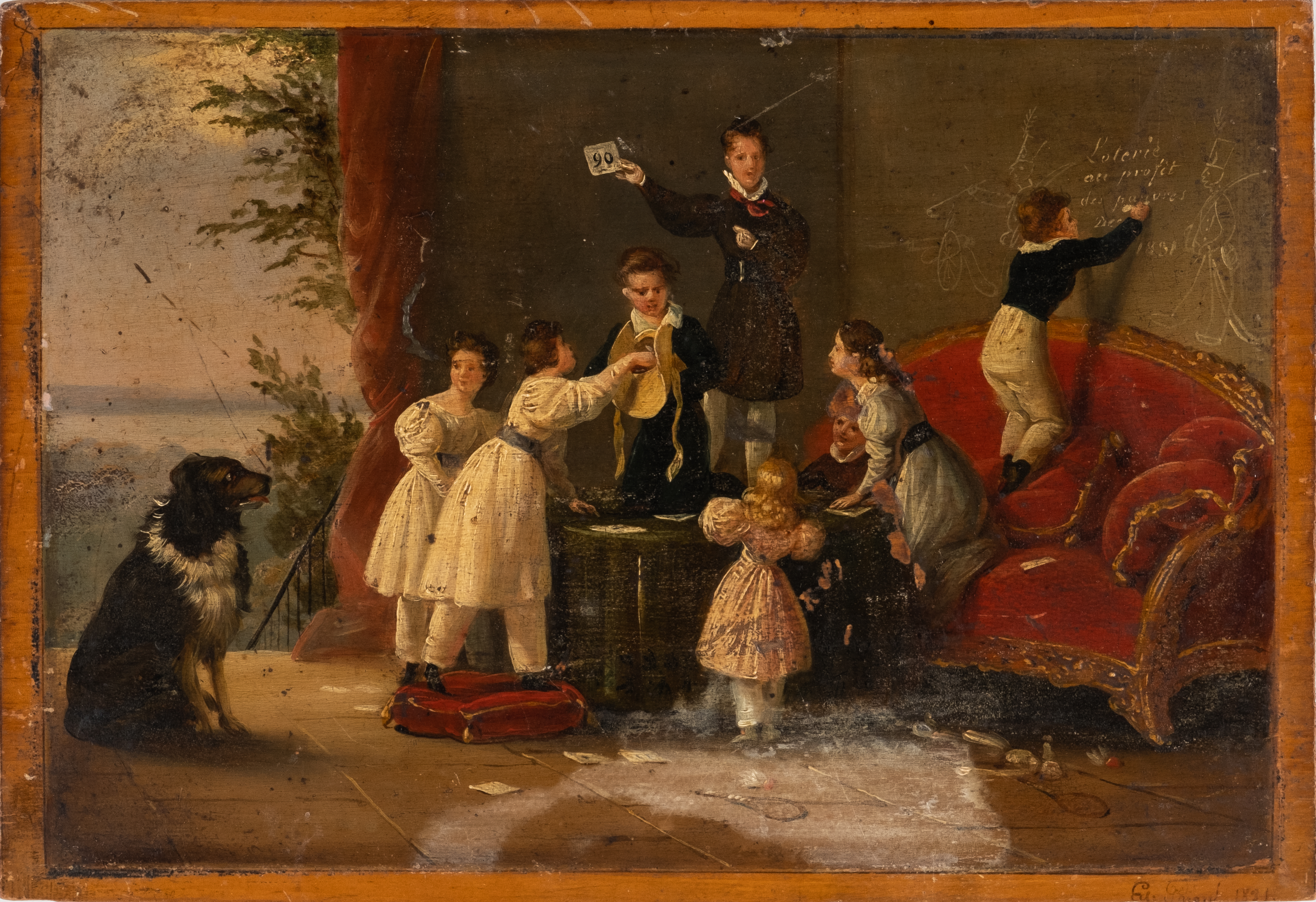
Loterie au profit des pauvres (lit. 'Lottery to benefit the poor'), 1831

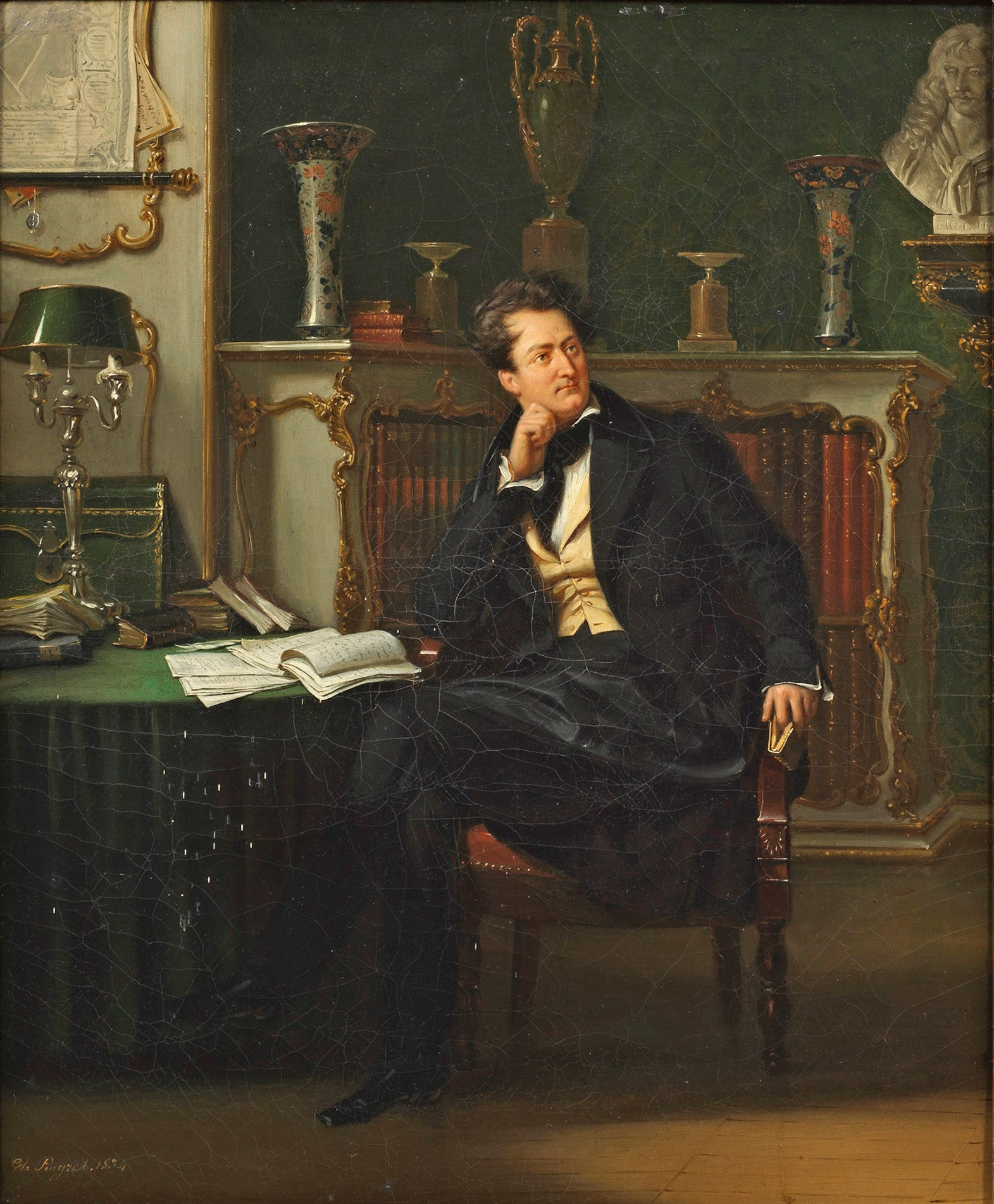
Portrait eines Literaten in seinem Salon (lit. 'Portrait of a Literary Man in his Salon'), 1834

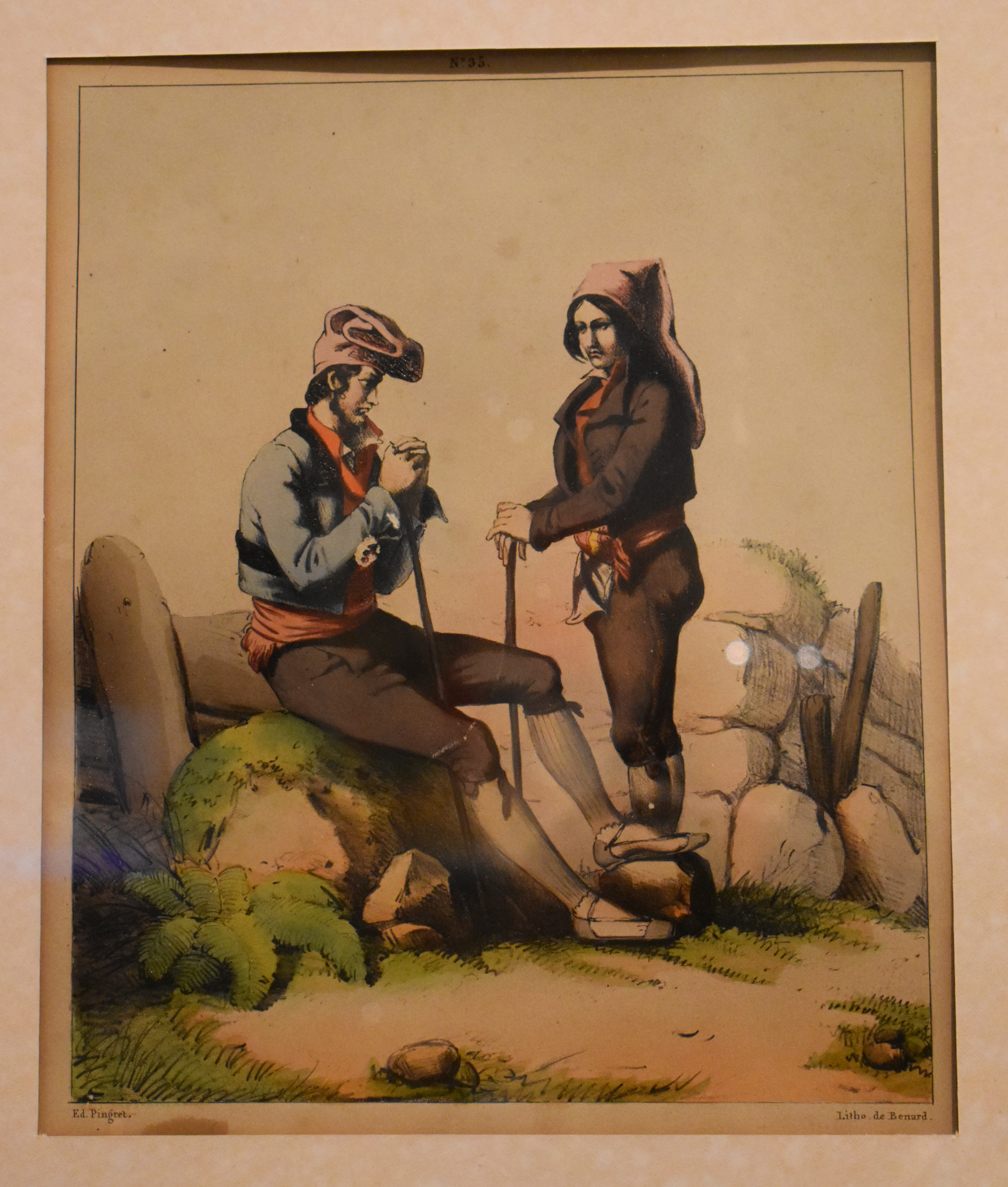
Costumes des Pyrénées, 1834; lithographed by Bergers Aranais, part of a series of Swiss illustrations

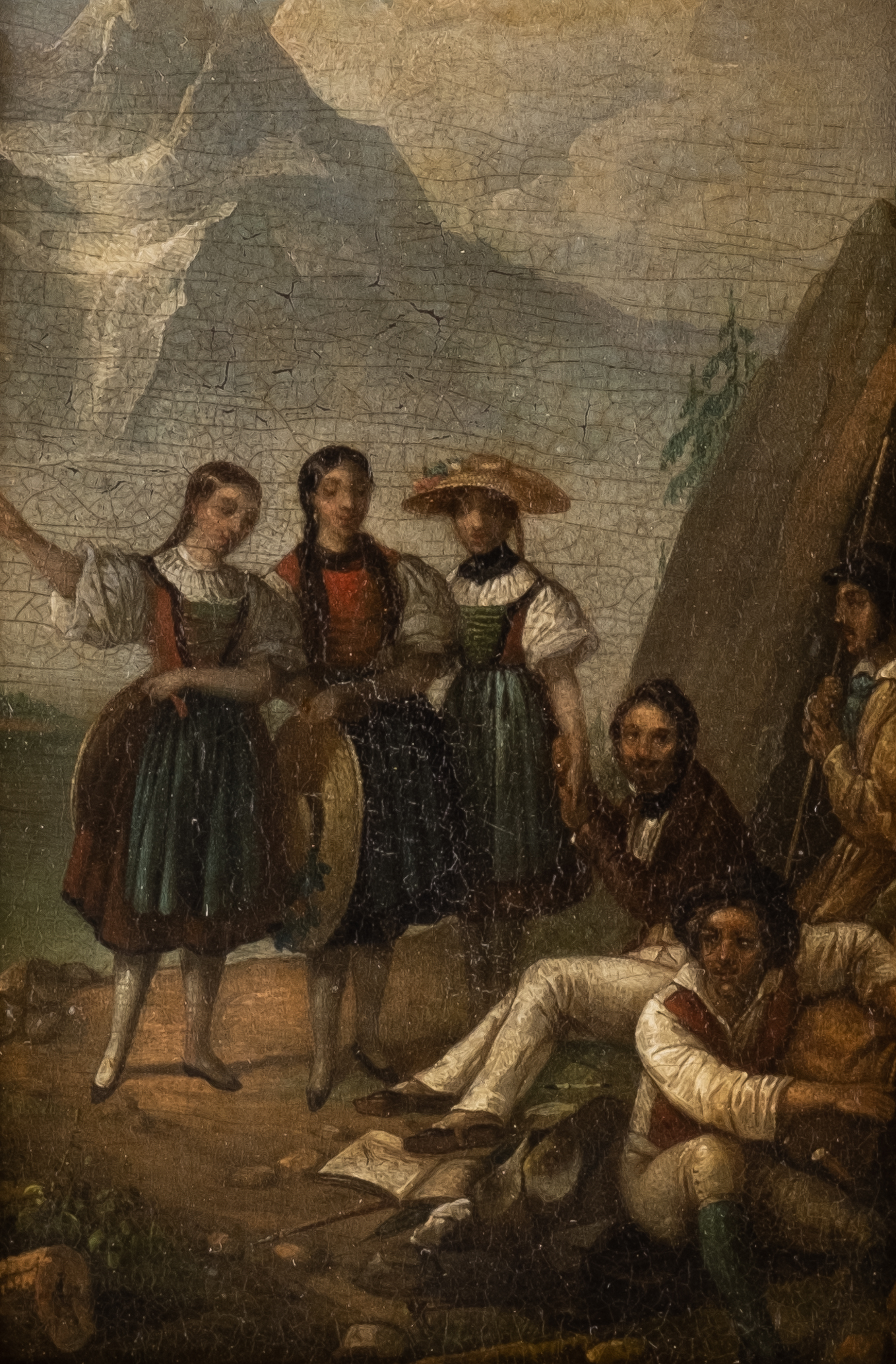
Les artists en Suisse (lit. 'Artists in Switzerland'), unknown year but likely circa 1830s

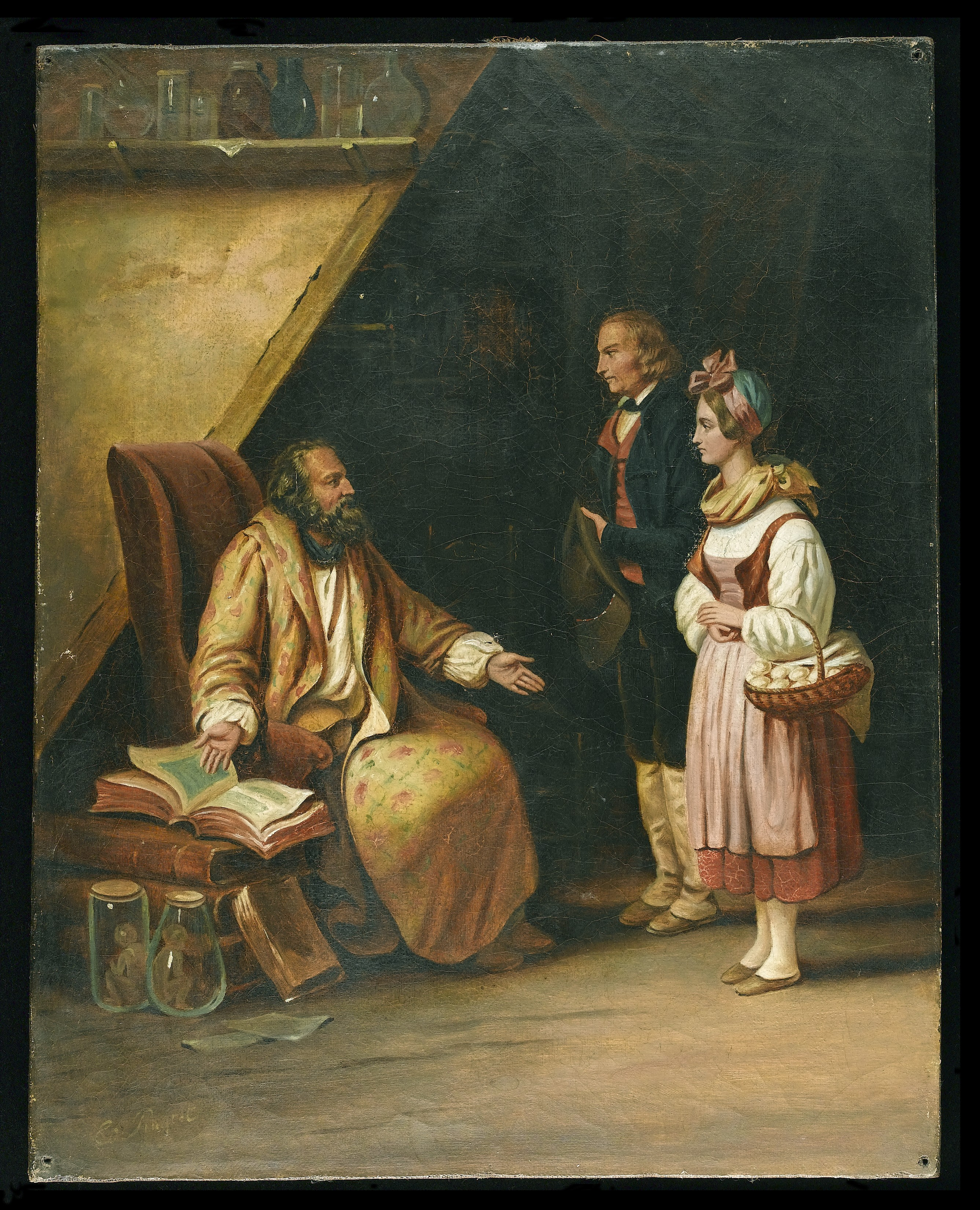
A young couple visit a savant who consults ancient volumes in order to provide counselling to them, c. 1833

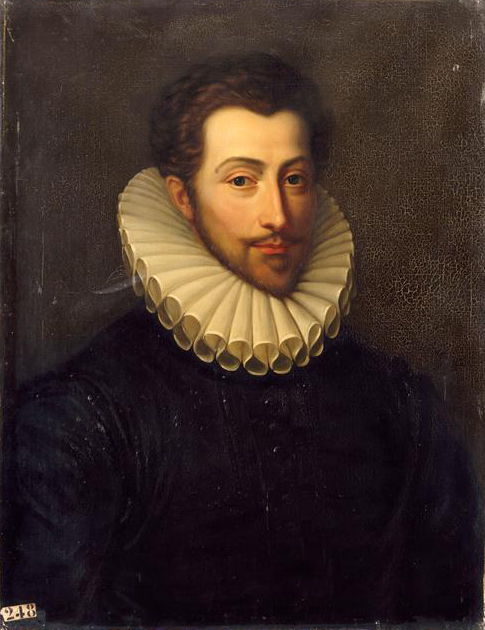
Portrait of Louis de Clermont, seigneur de Bussy d'Amboise, 1835

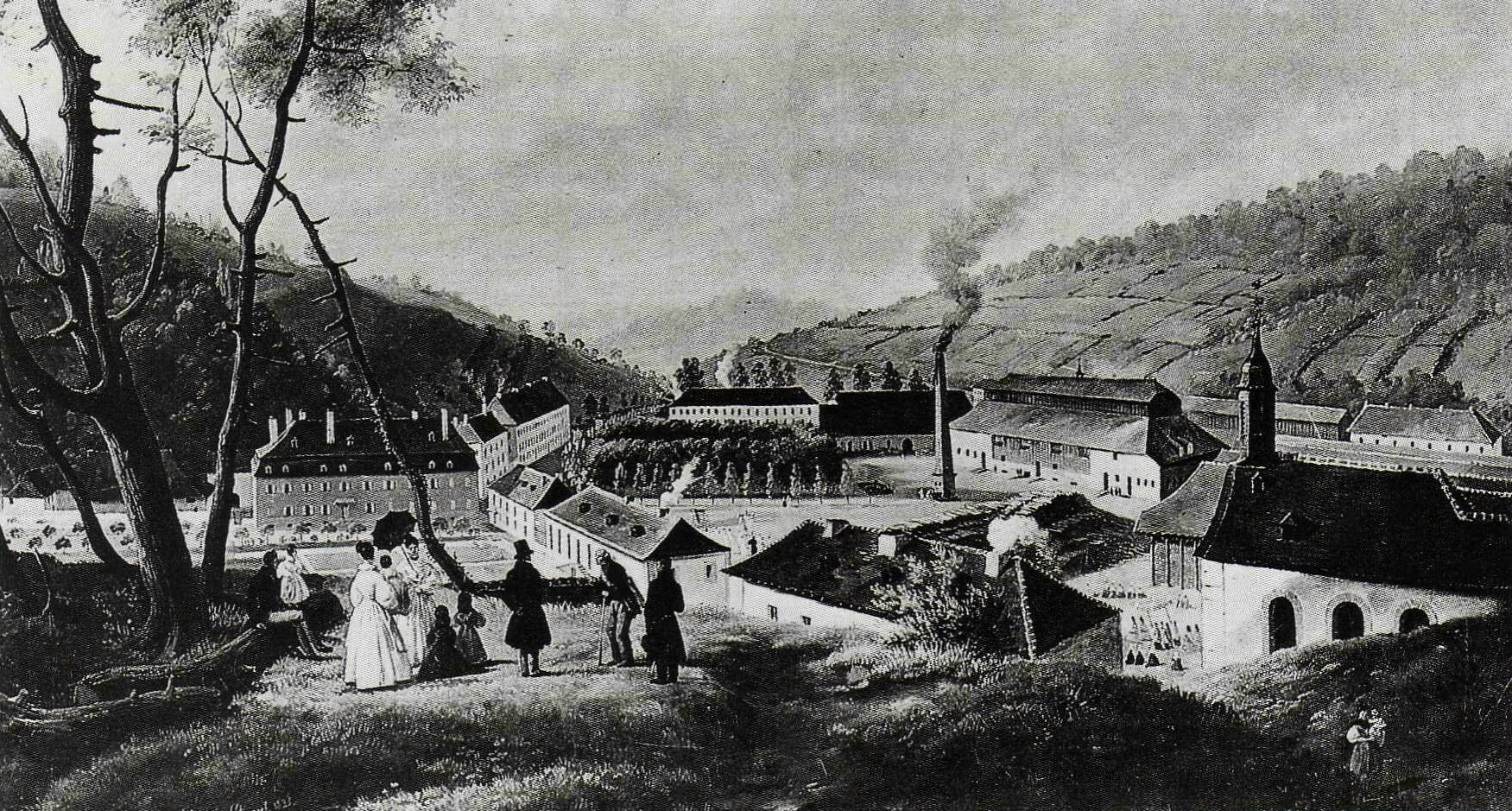
Saint-Louis-lès-Bitche, 1836

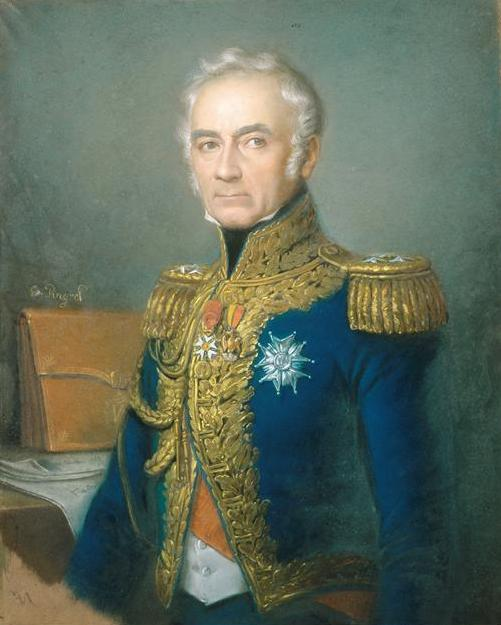
Le général comte C. T. de Montholon, c. 1840

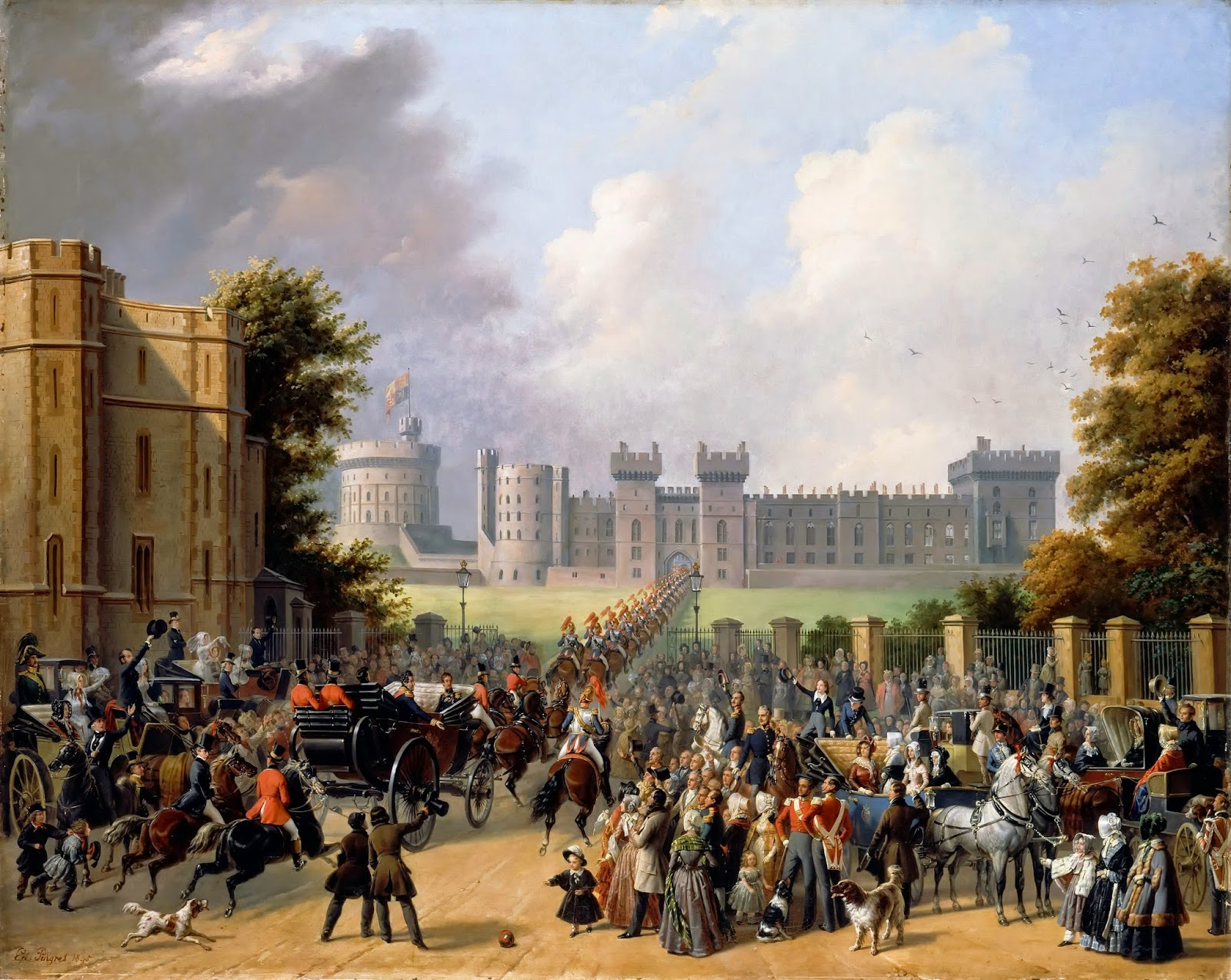
The Arrival of King Louis Philippe at Windsor Castle, 1844

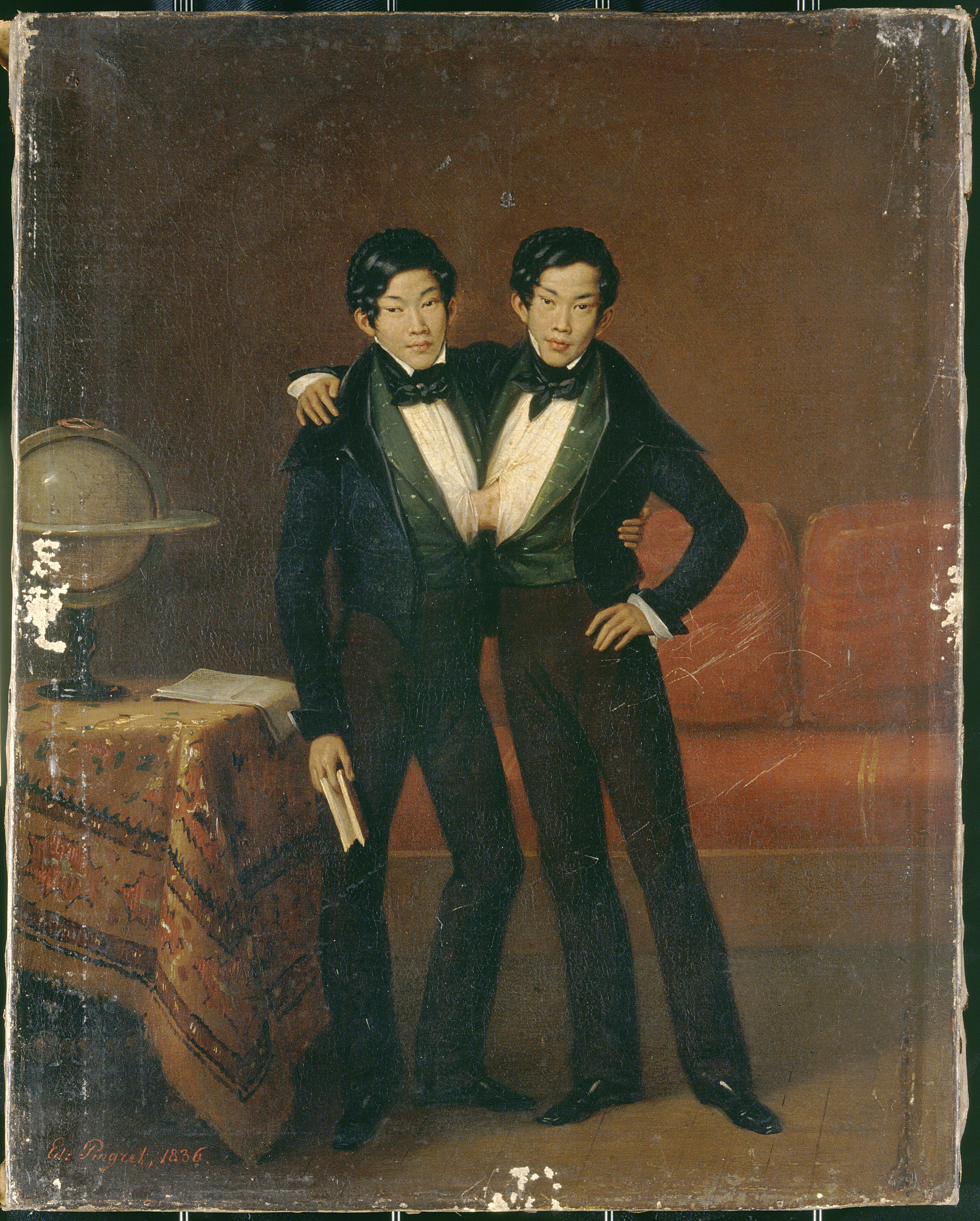
Portrait of Chang and Eng Bunker, 1846

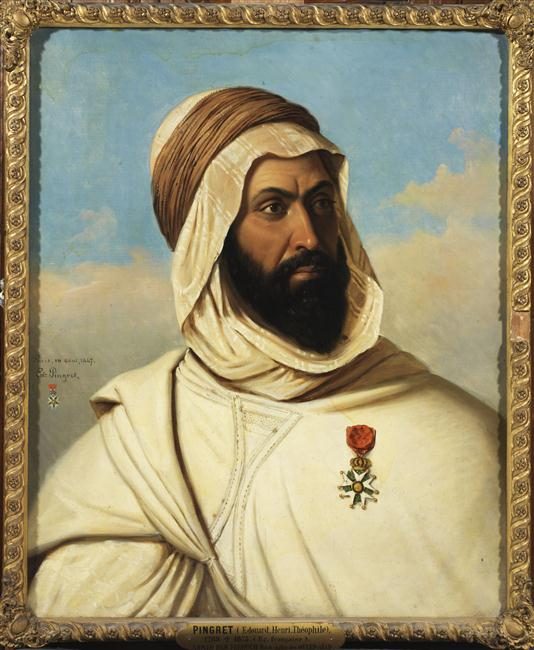
Portrait of Ahmed Ben Ferruch, 1847

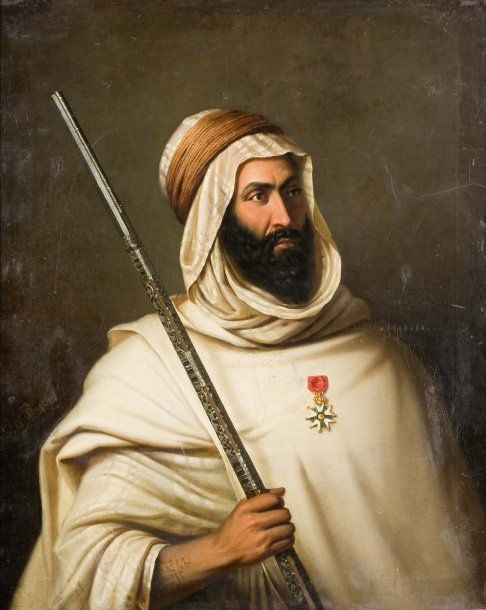
Alternate portrait of Ahmed Ben Ferruch, 1847

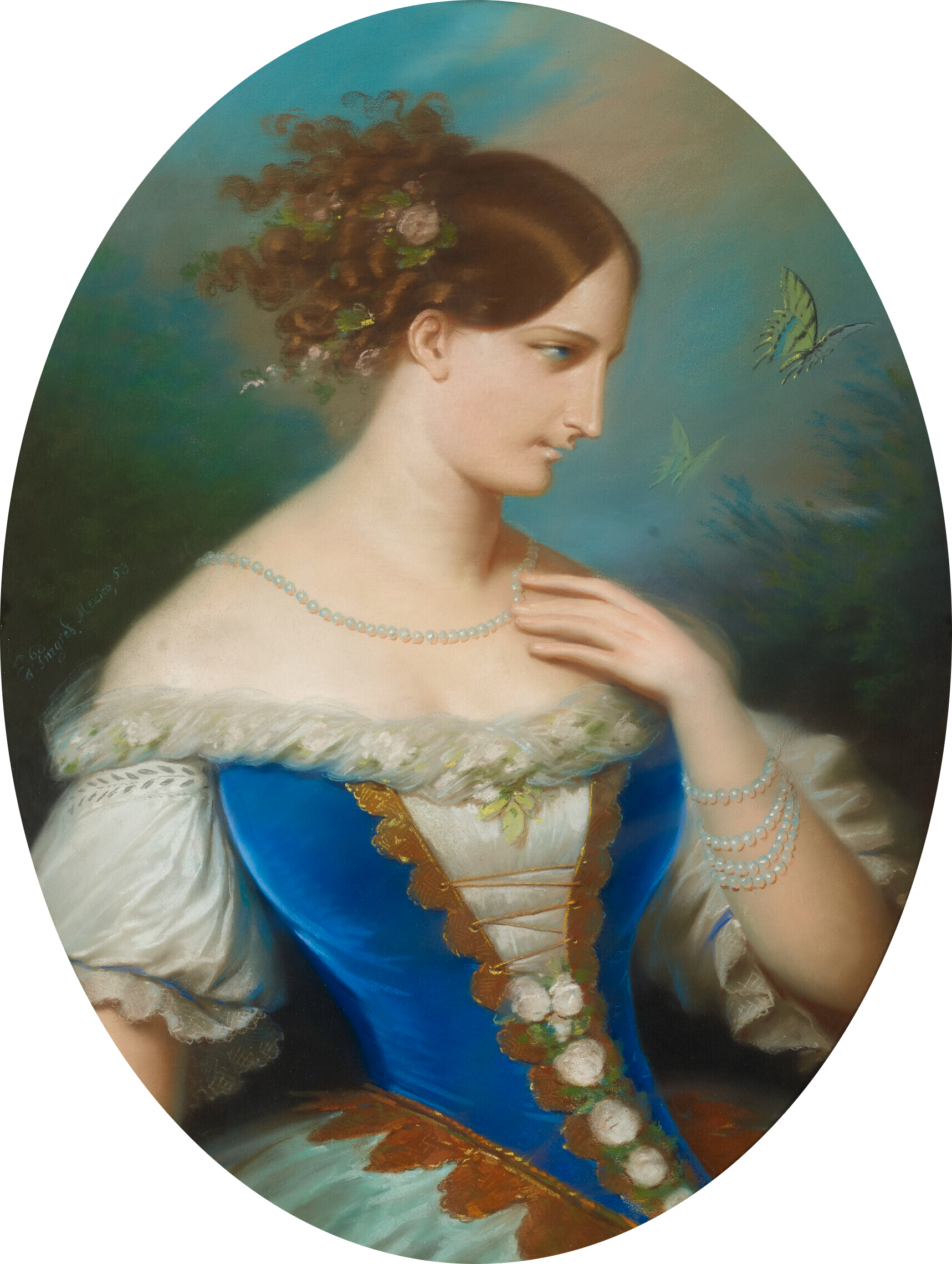
Adele Monplaisir, 1853

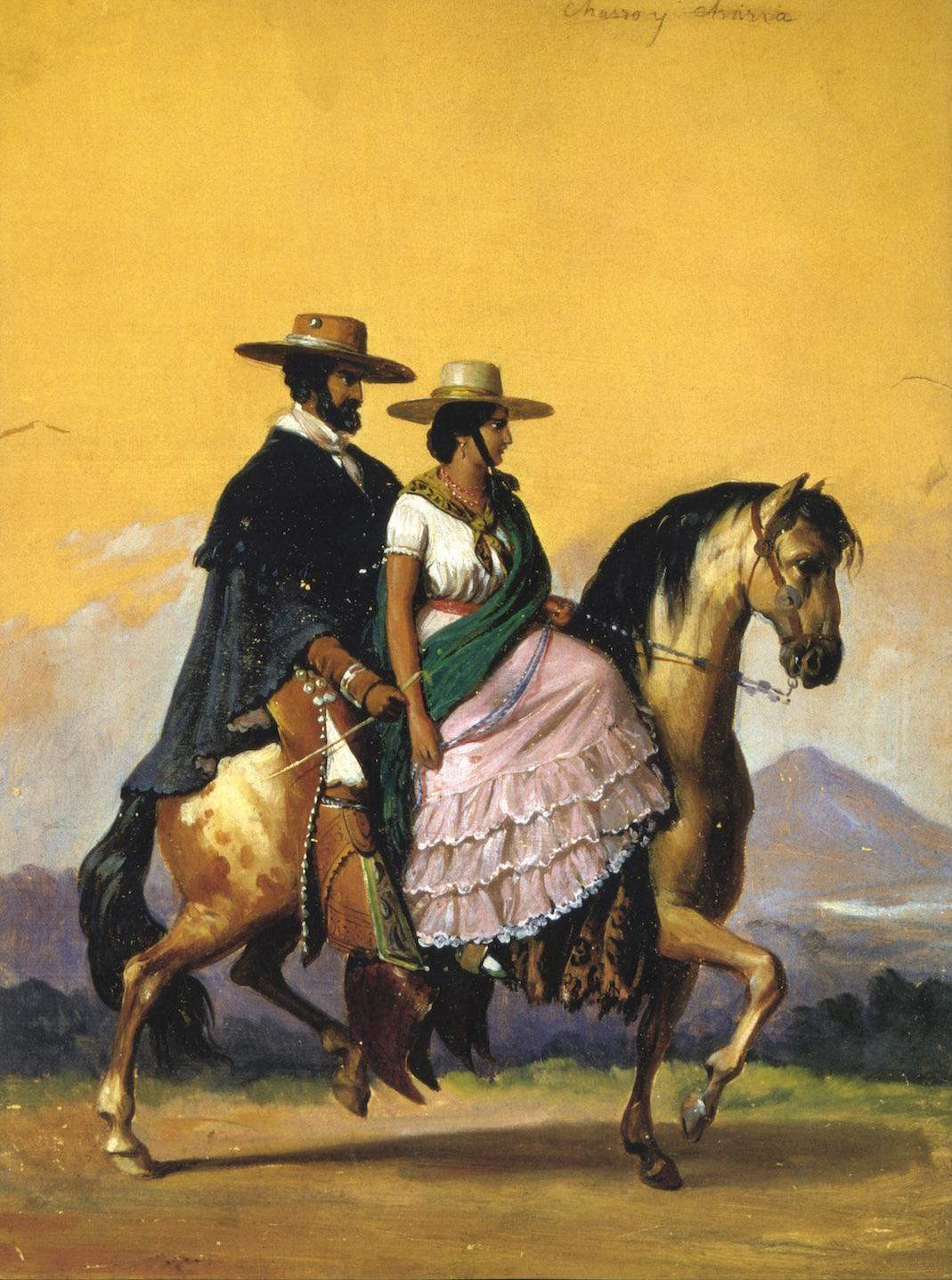
Charro y Charra, 1853

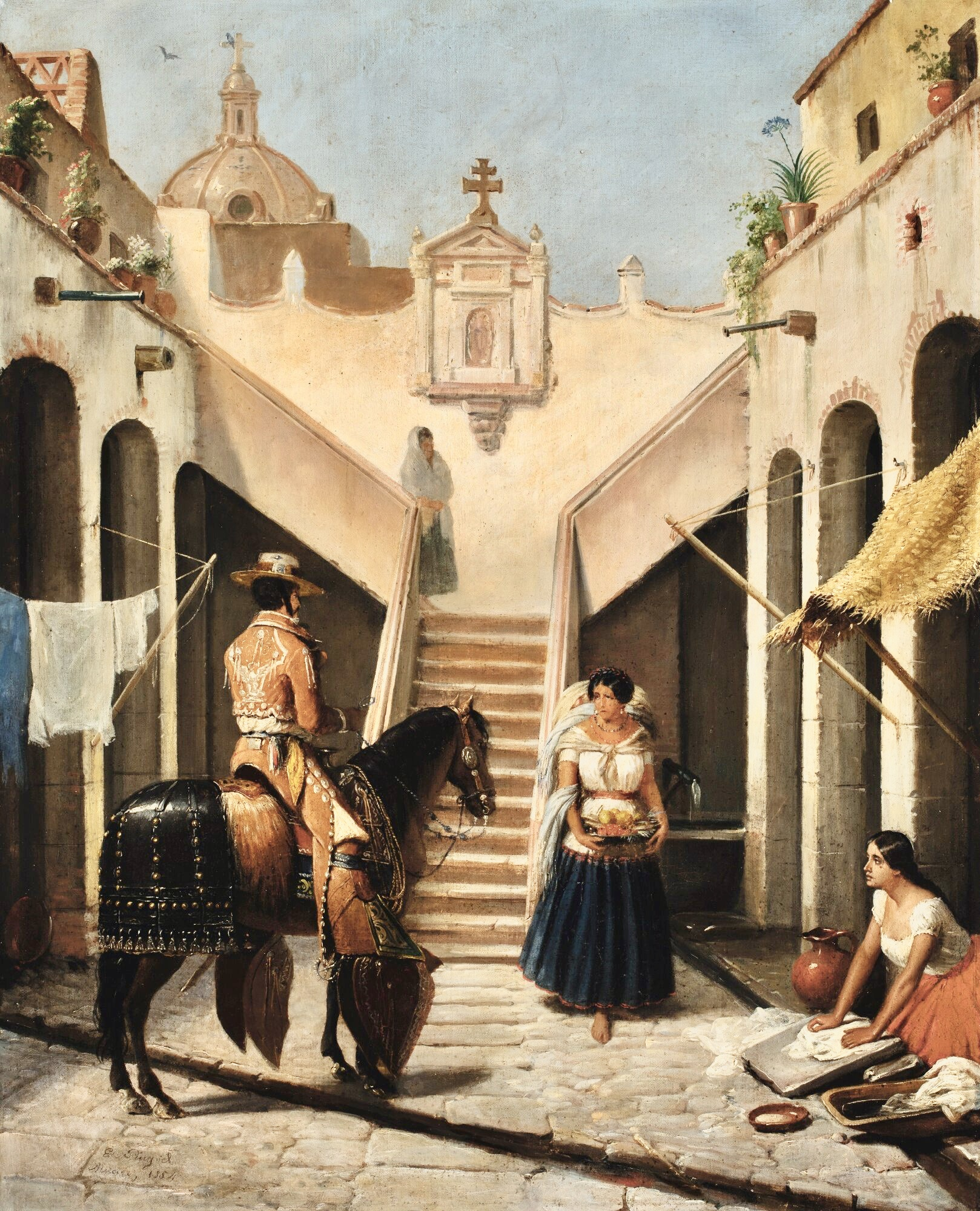
Chinaco e india en patio mexicano (lit. 'Chinaco and India on a Mexican patio'), 1854

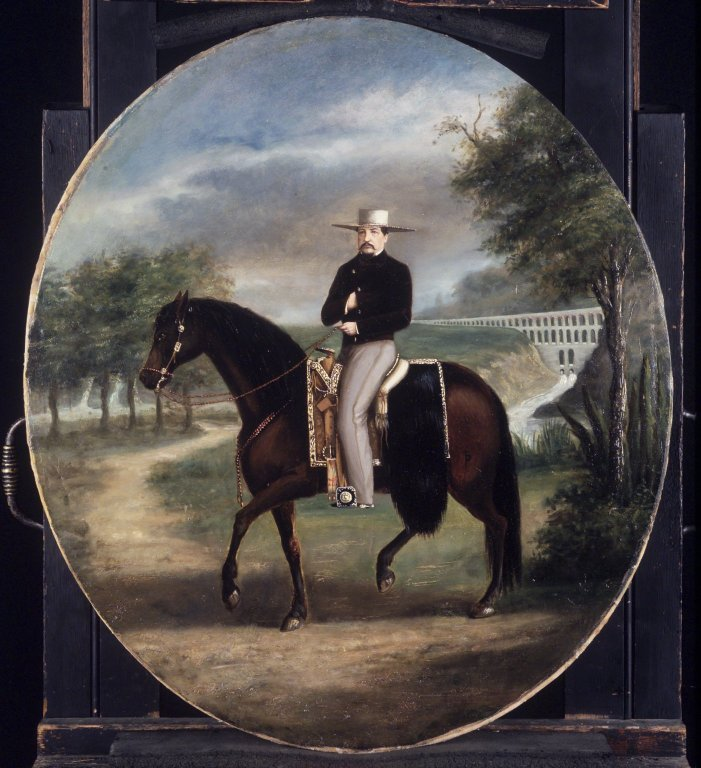
Portrait of Don Manuel Romero de Terreros y Villar-Villamil, c. 1865

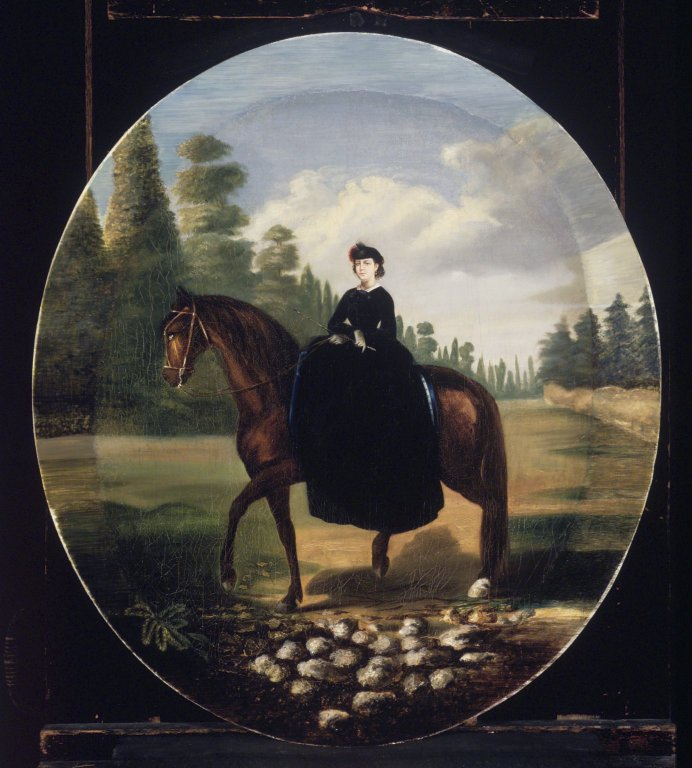
Portrait of Doña María Josefa Romero de Terreros y Gómez de Parada, c. 1865
