= Simon Simon (disambiguation) =

Simon Simon (fl. 1735-1788) was a French harpsichordist and composer.

Simon Simon may also refer to:

- Simon, Simon, a 1970 comedy short film directed by Graham Stark
- "Simon Simon", a 1988 single by Dale Bozzio from the album Riot in English
- The Amazing Adventures of Simon Simon, a 1981 album by John Surman and Jack DeJohnette
- Simon & Simon, an American detective television series
- Simon Simon is in the chorus of El gran varón, a Latin song by Salsa musician Willie Colón
