= Lèves =

- Commune
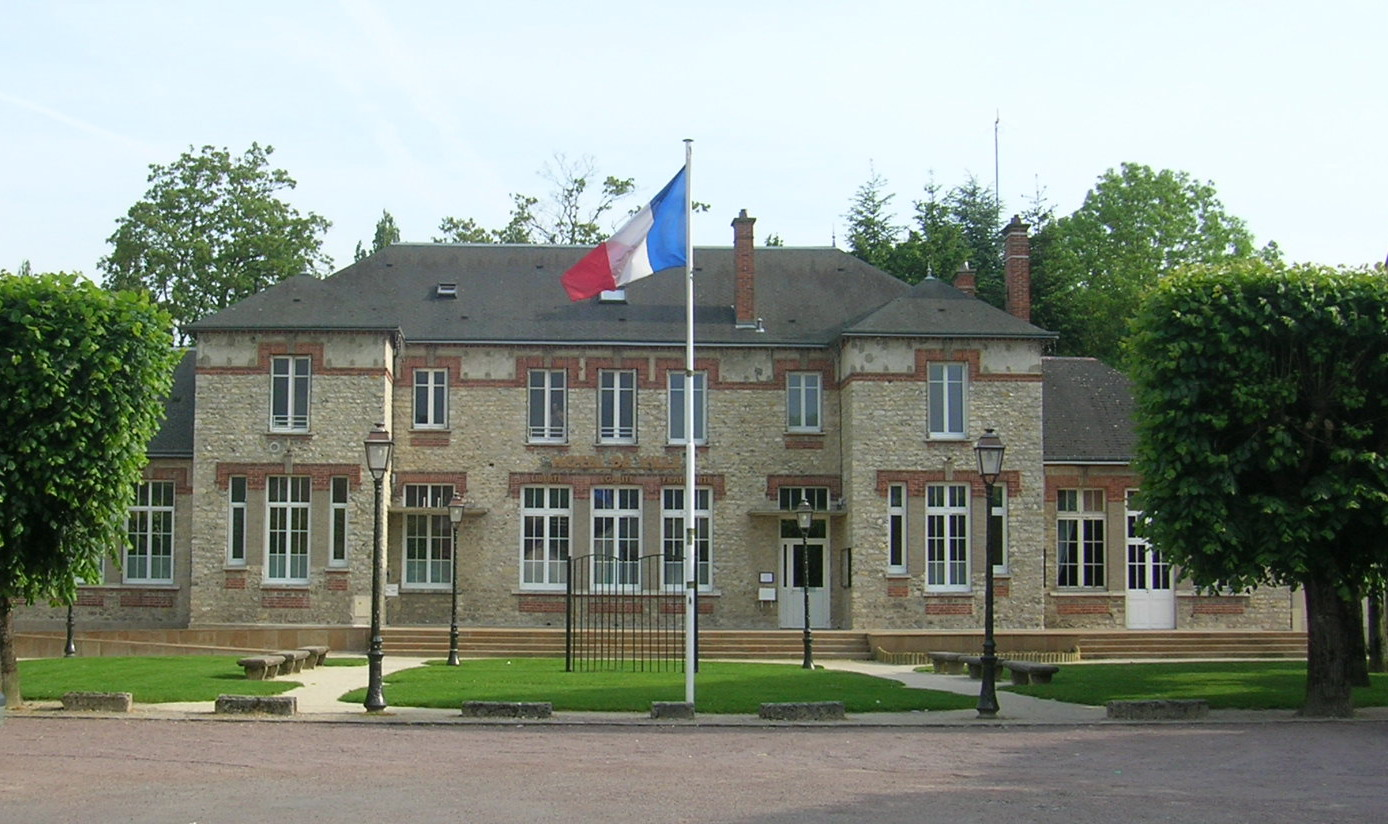
- The town hall in Lèves

- Coat of arms
- Location of Lèves
- Location within France Location within Centre-Val de Loire
- Coordinates: 48°28′11″N 1°28′57″E
- Country: France
- Region: Centre-Val de Loire
- Department: Eure-et-Loir
- Arrondissement: Chartres
- Canton: Chartres-3
- Intercommunality: CA Chartres Métropole

Government
  - Mayor (2020–2026): Rémi Martial
- Area^{1}: 7.51 km^{2} (2.90 sq mi)
- Elevation: 126 m (413 ft)
- Highest elevation: 169 m (554 ft)
- Lowest elevation: 120 m (390 ft)
- Population (2023): 5,685
  - Density: 757/km^{2} (1,960/sq mi)
- Time zone: UTC+01:00 (CET)
  - Summer (DST): UTC+02:00 (CEST)
- INSEE/Postal code: 28209 /28300
- Website: http://www.ville-leves.fr
- ^{1} French Land Register data, which excludes lakes, ponds, glaciers > 1 km^{2} (0.386 sq mi or 247 acres) and river estuaries.

Lèves (French pronunciation: [lɛv]) is a commune in the Eure-et-Loir department in Northern France.

== Population ==
Historical population
Year	Pop.	±% p.a.
1968	2,441	—
1975	3,111	+3.53%
1982	3,427	+1.39%
1990	3,920	+1.69%
1999	4,308	+1.05%
2007	4,398	+0.26%
2012	5,637	+5.09%
2017	5,801	+0.58%
2023	5,685	−0.34%
Source: INSEE

== International relations ==
Lèves is twinned with the English town of Nailsworth, Gloucestershire.

== See also ==
- Communes of the Eure-et-Loir department
- Bernard Jumentier
