= La Pothouin =

La Pothouin is a short piece for harpsichord by French baroque composer Jacques Duphly. It is still popular today and is often played in concerts and collections of Baroque music. It has also been transcribed for guitar.

== Origin of name ==
The origin of the name "La Pothouin" is obscure, though it may be associated with the Pothouin family or a member of it. Pierre-Salomon Pothouin, Bâtonnier of the Ordre des Avocats (barristers) of the Parlement of Paris from 1745 to 1746, lived and worked in Paris between 1673 and 1755 when Duphly was in residence there. Pothouin's son Pierre-Charles was also bâtonnier of the barristers of the Parlement of Paris (1775–1776). Another son François-Salomon was known as "Maître Pothouin d'Huillet". Pierre-Salomon's elder brother was a librarian in Paris.

Pothouin is also the name of one of the clique of Jansenist lawyers who were among the most staunch defenders of the ancien régime in France between 1720 and 1745.

== See also ==
- Power and Politics in Old Regime France, 1720-1745, Peter R. Campbell, Routledge (1996) ISBN 0-415-06333-7
