= Florence Malgoire =

French musician (1960–2023)

Florence Malgoire (9 March 1960 – 11 August 2023) was a French classical violinist, pedagogue, and conductor.

== Biography ==
Born in Dugny from a family of musicians, Malgoire began her career under the leadership of her father Jean-Claude Malgoire within La Grande Écurie et la Chambre du Roy and of her teacher Sigiswald Kuijken with La Petite Bande. Since 1987, she held solo violin positions in baroque ensembles such as Philippe Herreweghe's La Chapelle Royale, Christophe Rousset's Les Talens Lyriques, and William Christie's Les Arts florissants.

In 2003, she founded "Les Dominos", an ensemble with a variable membership and structure, specialising in 17th and 18th century music, which performed in Naples, Beaune, Geneva, Lille, etc. To deepen her sonata work, Malgoire co-founded Les Nièces de Rameau, an ensemble oriented towards the chamber music repertoire.

Alongside her solo career, Malgoire was interested in musical direction: after radio in French-speaking Switzerland, for which she was invited to conduct Jean-Philippe Rameau's motets at the Agapé Festival, she conducted Jean-Féry Rebel, Georg Friedrich Haendel, Marc-Antoine Charpentier and Bach, but also Mozart's Requiem and Heinrich Biber.

European specialist of the ancient violin, Malgoire intervened from Sablé to Tokyo while passing by the Royaumont Foundation, the Juilliard School of New York, and Rio de Janeiro. In 2000, she began teaching ancient violin and chamber music at the Conservatoire de Genève and at the Schola Cantorum de Paris until her death.

Florence Malgoire died on 11 August 2023, at the age of 63.

== Discography ==
- 1990: Mondonville, Pièces de clavecin en sonates avec accompagnement de violon - Christophe Rousset, harpsichord (3 June 1990, Disques Pierre Verany / Arion) OCLC 799545990
- 1991: Clérambault, Cantates profanes - Isabelle Poulenard, soprano; Gilles Ragon, tenor; Ensemble Amalia: Philippe Allain-Dupré, flute; Florence Malgoire, violin; Marianne Müller, viol; Aline Zylberajch, harpsichord; Yasunori Imamura, theorbo (1–4 January 1991, Opus 111) OCLC 27753526
- 1994: Leclair, Récréation de musique pour 2 violons et Basse continue - Les Nièces de Rameau (Disques Pierre Vérany) OCLC 417330137
- 1995: Purcell, Trio Sonatas in three and four parts - Les Nièces de Rameau (9–12 March 1995, Disques Pierre Verany) OCLC 658390297
- 1998: Rameau's Pièces de clavecin en concerts - Les Nièces de Rameau (23–24 February 1998, Accord/Universal) OCLC 492047896
- 2003: CPE Bach, Sonates en trio, Sanguineus et Melancholicus - Les Nièces de Rameau (21–25 October 2002, Zig-Zag Territoires) OCLC 658983297
- 2005: Bach, Sonatas for violin and obbligato harpsichord (BWV 1014–1019) - Blandine Rannou, harpsichord (5–16 May 1003, Zig Zag Territoires) OCLC 658339755
- 2011: Jacquet de la Guerre, Sonates pour violon - Ensemble Les Dominos: Guido Balestracci, viol; Blandine Rannou, harpsichord; Jonathan Rubin, theorbo and guitar (October 2010, Ricercar) OCLC 811456354
- 2011: Biber's Rosary Sonatas - Ensemble Les Dominos: Guido Balestracci, viol, lyrone; Angélique Mauillon, harp; Jonathan Rubin, theorbo, Baroque guitar; Richard Myron, violone; Blandine Rannou, organ (July 2011, Psalmus PSAL 018/3) BnF 43694099
- 2012: de Saint George, Plaisir d'aimer, souffrance d'aimer, Romances et sonates - Luanda Siqueira, soprano; Olivier Baumont, harpsichord Benoist Stehlin 1750 and square Longman & Broderip piano-forte, London 1795 (2011, Euromusic/Loreley Production LY046/Harmonia Mundi)
- 2012: Couperin, Sonatas - Les Dominos (May 2012, Ricercar RIC 330)
- 2013: Charpentier, Sonate à 8 H.548, Pour un reposoir H.508, Noël pour les instruments H.531 & H.534, Les Dominos, Les Agréments, Choeur de chambre de Namur. Florence Malgoire, violin and conducting (May 2012, May 2013, Ricercar RIC 338)
- 2014: Rameau, Concerts en sextuors - Les Dominos: Stéphanie de Failly, Sue Ying Koang, violins; Simon Heyerick, viola; Claire Giardelli, bass violin; Cyril Poulet, cello; Evolène Kiener, bassoon; Serge Saitta, Amélie Michel, flutes and piccolos; Laurent Stewart, harpsichord; Florence Malgoire, violin and conducting (2014, Ricercar RIC 350)
