= Bernard Jumentier =

French composer

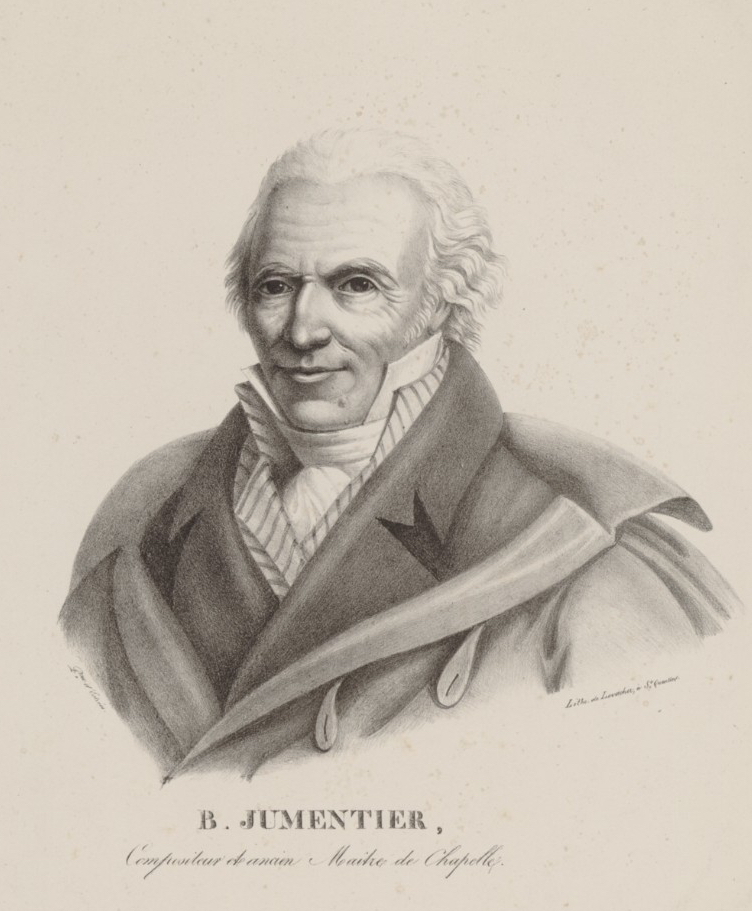
- Bernard Jumentier
- Born: 24 March 1749; Lèves
- Died: 7 December 1829 (aged 80); Saint-Quentin
- Occupation: Composer

Bernard Jumentier (24 March 1749 – 7 December 1829) was a French composer of classical and sacred music as well as maître de chapelle.

== Biography ==
The son of a vine-grower, destined for the ecclesiastical state by his parents, Bernard Jumentier entered the seminary of Chartres to attend his studies. More interested in music than in orders, he has been placed according to his wish in the mastership of the Chartres Cathedral, under the direction of Michel Delalande (1739–1812), master of music of this church since 1761. It is therefore in this capacity of "choir boy" (child singing in the choir) that he learned singing, (including plainsong) and more generally the main musical disciplines, harmony, counterpoint and musical composition. He was also trained to play the pipe organ and the harpsichord.

He was only eighteen years old, in 1767, when he became a music master at Senlis before returning to Notre-Dame de Chartres, as early as 1768, as cantor. He later served in Saint-Malo and subsequently in the Coutances Cathedral. At the end of 1776 he was appointed chapel-master of the collégiale et royale de Saint-Quentin. He remained in control until his death in 1829, despite an interruption of about ten years, due to the French Revolution.

In 1783 he wrote his Traité du chant.

A follower of Jean-Philippe Rameau and Christoph Willibald Gluck, from 1783 to 1787, he presented some of his motets, in the chapel of Louis XVI at Versailles, and at the Notre Dame of Paris cathedral. They were appreciated, but the progression of his career was brutally prevented by the Revolution of 1789.

In 1783, in Paris, the Concert Spirituel of the Palais des Tuileries gave a great chorus motet of Jumentier, whose title we do not know.

In 1793, when the belongings of the Cathedral chapter of Saint-Quentin were confiscated and the choir house seized and then sold as bien national, he found himself, if not without resources and without asylum, at least somewhat seriously destitute (the Ecclesiastical Revolutionary Committee nevertheless granted the church musicians a small pension, calculated according to their years of practice). Jumentier had to live to a large extent on private lessons he gave.

During the Revolution he also wrote a historical opera, Chloris et Médor, and some patriotic romances.

In 1802, at the reopening of the churches, he resumed, at first gratuitously, the instruction of choir-children. He was able to direct them until 1825.

It is also known that one of his masses (dedicated to Saint Cecilia) was given with great success in 1812, at the Saint-Eustache church in Paris, under the direction of Rodolphe Kreutzer.

Jumentier composed a large number of pieces of sacred music and a little secular music. What remains of his original manuscripts (after the last war) is preserved in the library of Saint-Quentin (5 masses for 4 voices and 5 masses for 5 voices, 2 oratorios, 3 Te Deum, a hundred motets and psalms as well as 2 symphonies). His Requiem mass was played at his burial.

There are handwritten copies of some of his compositions in the Bibliothèque nationale de France, in the fund of the Conservatoire de Paris (6 psalms, including his De profundis).

He was the owner of the Stehlin harpsichord dated 1750, given in legacy and exhibited at the Antoine-Lécuyer Museum of Saint-Quentin, an eminent example of the great French craft of the 18th century.

== Bibliography ==
- Nicole Desgranges, Bernard Jumentier, 1749–1829, maître de musique de la collégiale de Saint-Quentin, 1997 and 2007
- Nicole Desgranges, Bernard Jumentier (1749–1829): Bernard Jumentier et son époque, 2005
- Bernard Jumentier, 1749–1829 : maître de chapelle à Saint-Quentin, Association pour l'expansion et la coordination des activités régionales musicales (Picardie), 1991
- Bernard Dompnier (under the dir. of), Maîtrises & chapelles aux XVII and XVIII : Des institutions musicales au service de Dieu, Clermont-Ferrand, Presses Universitaires Blaise-Pascal, 2003, 568 p.
- Félix Raugel, Dossier Bernard Jumentier, 1914
- F. Raugel, Bernard Jumentier (1749–1829), Maître de chapelle de la Collégiale de Saint-Quentin et ses œuvres inédites, 1973
- Pierre Larousse, Grand dictionnaire universel du XIXe : français, historique, géographique, mythologique, bibliographique, 1866–1877
- François-Joseph Fétis, Biographie universelle des musiciens et bibliographie générale de la musique. [vol. 4], 1866–1868
- Marcelle Benoît (dir.), Dictionnaire de la musique en France aux XVII and XVIII, Paris, Fayard, 1992 (article : « Jumentier, abbé Bernard », by Béatrice Dunner).
- CENTRE D'HISTOIRE « ESPACES ET CULTURES » (CHEC), Les musiciens d'église en 1790. Premier état d'une enquête sur un groupe professionnel, in : « Annales historiques de la Révolution française », N0.2, Université Blaise-Pascal, Clermont-Ferrand, 2005, p. 57-82 (article written by Stéphane GOMIS, Frédérique LONGIN, Laurent BORNE, Grégory GOUDOT and Bernard DOMPNIER, members of the Groupe de prosopographie des musiciens of the Université de Clermont-Ferrand). Travail sur la série D XIX (90, 91, 92) des Archives nationales.
