= Simon Simon =

French harpsichordist and composer

Simon Simon (born in Vaux de Cernay either in 1720 or 1735, near Rambouillet; died after 1788 in Dreux) was a French harpsichordist and composer.

== Biography ==
Most of the accounts of his life derive from the recollections of Jean-Benjamin de La Borde, in his Essai sur la musique ancienne et moderne.

=== Youth ===
At the age of seven, he was entrusted to his uncle Butet, organist at an abbey near Caen. It is remarked that "the mediocrity of the master’s talents spread to the progress of the pupil". At age thirteen, his harpsichord skills were noticed by the Marquise de la Mézangère, a pupil of François Couperin. In 1747 she decided to take him in at her Paris hôtel to teach him the harpsichord while the violinist Saint-Saire taught him music. He later went on to study composition with Antoine Dauvergne.

=== Career ===
Louis XV gave Simon Simon the role of harpsichord teacher to the heirs to the throne, and later also the Queen Marie Leszczyńska and the Countess of Artois. He married a Mademoiselle Tardif, pupil of Le Tourneur, who became his assistant. Throughout the reign of Louis XVI he remained at Versailles. He survived the French Revolution, and retired to Montfort-l'Amaury and then to Dreux.

== Works ==
Simon Simon published three books of harpsichord pieces, between 1776 and 1770, although some of these also include lines for the violin and cello. These are among the last books of harpsichord in France, alongside Jacques Duphly and Jean-Jacques Charpentier.

The Bibliothèque nationale de France also holds a manuscript for a treatise on accompaniment, entitled Théorie pratique D'Accompagnement. Par Mr Simon, likely for his own pupils.

=== Pièces de Clavecin, Op. 1 ===
Simon's Opus 1 collection of accompanied keyboard music was published in 1761, and contains six suites. He describes his interest in uniting the French and Italian styles of keyboard music, which had been a common concern for many of the French harpsichordists of the 18th century. Its overall organization has been described as "appear[ing] to be an exercise in alternating contrasts between the French and Italian styles", and evokes many different genres of the mid-18th century late Baroque.

In his first Book, Simon breaks with tradition by using multiple keys in a single suite, and incorporates sonata-like violin and cello lines into some of the harpsichord movements. He explains his rationale in a preface:

Au lieu de donner à l’ordinaire des Suites pour le Clavecin seul dans un même ton (ce qui m’eût fait tomber dans une sorte d’uniformité et de sécheresse qu’il convient d’éviter), j’ai crû devoir en composer quelques unes avec accompagnement de Violon. Elles en seront plus intéressantes, parce que la Mélodie, qui perd les grâces de sa rondeur dans les sons désunis du Clavecin, sera soutenue par les sons filés et harmonieux du violon.	Instead of the usual provision of Suites for the Harpsichord alone in the same key (which would have had me fall into a sort of uniformity and dryness that should be avoided), I felt I should compose some with Violin accompaniment. They will be more interesting, because the Melody, which loses the graces of its roundness in the disunited sounds of the Harpsichord, will be sustained by the [well-]spun and harmonious sounds of the violin.

The individual suites comprise:

- Suite No. 1, in E minor
1. La Mézangère, Allemande
2. Sarabande
3. Légèrement et détaché
- Suite No. 2, in A
1. La Saint Saire, with violin
2. Airs tendres, with violin
3. Allegro, with violin
4. La Magnanville, Ière Gavotte, IIe Gavotte
5. La Tyrconell, Pantomime (in D major)
6. La D’Eaubonne
- Suite No. 3
1. La Fontaine (G major)
2. La Moriceau, Minuet & Four Variations (F major)
3. La de Nangis, Musette (C minor)
4. La de Broglie, Minuets (C major/minor)
5. La de Villemeur, with violin (F major)
- Suite No. 4 (with violin) La de Croisœuil
1. Introduction (F minor/major)
2. Andante (F minor)
3. Vif (F major)
- Suite No. 5
1. La La=Corée (E-flat minor)
2. La L’arrard (G minor)
3. La Le Daulceur (E-flat major)
- Suite No. 6: Concerto que l’on peut Excecuter avec un Violon Seul (violon & violoncelle), La La Font
1. Presto (G major)
2. Gavottes (D major/minor)
3. Vif (G major)
4. La de Poyanne (D minor)
5. La de Guibeville. Air gay (A major)

== See also ==
- List of French harpsichordists
