= Benoist Stehlin =

French harpsichord maker

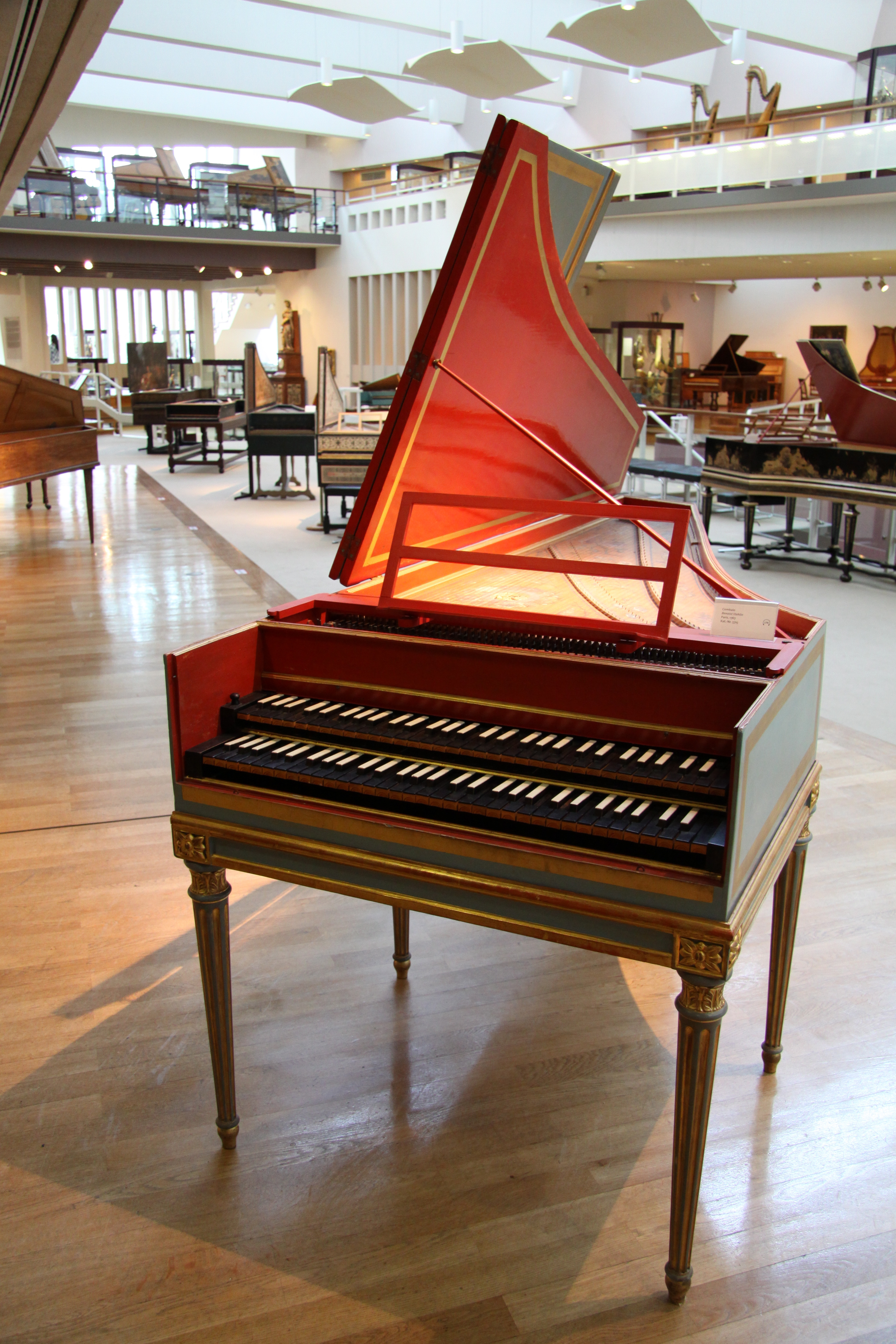
Harpsichord made by Benoist Stehlin in 1767, Berlin Musikinstrumenten-Museum, Kat.-Nr. 5715.

Benoist Stehlin (c.1732 – 11 July 1774) was a French harpsichord builder.

Stehlin was born in the Alsatian village of Jettingen; by 1750 he was living and working in Paris. He married Françoise Lemaire, daughter of a merchant from Péronne, on 13 September 1753. He was elected juror of his district on 23 November 1762, and at the end of 1773 rented an apartment on the Quai des Augustins. He died the following year. He kept several harpsichords and tools at the apartment, while important items were stored at his shop on Rue des Cordeliers. Everything was sold by his widow on 19 December 1774. Woodworking seems to have run in the family; not only was his father Georg a joiner, but his uncle, Jean-Baptiste Keiser (sometimes called L'Empereur) was also a harpsichord maker. Stehlin had no children.

The inventories of Stehlin's shop and apartment were made shortly after his death. In the apartment there was a woodworker's bench and a significant assortment of tools, along with two harpsichords by Stehlin and a 1630 Ruckers instrument he rebuilt and enlarged. The Ruckers was valued at 800 livres, while one of Stehlin's instruments was valued at 390 and an unpainted one at 300. The inventory of Stehlin's shop lists another woodworker's bench, fifteen instruments in progress, a quantity of lumber, and instruments by fellow harpsichord makers Nicholas Dumont and Louis Denis. There were also "four bad spinets all dilapidated," three harpsichord stands, and various tools.

Sheridan Germann maintains that the 1750 and 1760 instruments were both decorated by the same artist; she also believes this artist decorated five other surviving French harpsichords, the last of which was built in 1771. She describes the style of the decorator thus:

The style of the Stehlin Painter (so called because he painted both of the surviving Stehlin instruments) is, like the Hemsch Painter’s, very Rococo. But instead of taking the curling rhythms of the period, this painter expresses the restless energy and movement of that style at its most masculine and forceful... The lines are long and angular, and tulip flags snap in the wind like kite tails. Bold, dashing, unblended strokes are used for highlights and almost symbolize, rather than describe, the sepals of buds, or the irregularities of anemone and ranunculus foliage. Each flower takes its energy from the last, across small articulations of space, like the windblown spray from a fountain, so that the whole soundboard vibrates with movement. When rinceau borders are used, they build in the corners into arabesques that spray their energy into space in a series of diminishing dots that suggest the foam from a cresting wave. Robert Sayer, in The Florist (London, 1760) said that flowers should be ‘ripened to a degree of looseness subject to be folded and play in the wind’, and no soundboard painting better illustrates this dictum. The Stehlin painter’s curved lines get lower, leaner, and longer, more forceful and energetic, as his personal style gains in authority from 1765 onwards. The noisy blue macaw on the 1770 Dedeban soundboard...is an astonishing expression of exuberance, and it is unlikely that this soundboard took much longer than ten or twelve hours to paint.The painter knew exactly what he was doing, and accomplished it with maximum economy of means.

The three instruments by Stehlin that have survived have the range FF – f´´´ (five octaves), and are disposed 2 × 8´, 1 × 4´ with a shove coupler and buff stop. These specifications are typical for 18th-century French harpsichords. The 1750 harpsichord was owned at one time by Bernard Jumentier (1749–1829), composer, music teacher and maître de chapelle at the cathedral of Saint-Quentin, where the instrument is now in the Musée Antoine Lécuyer.

The 1760 instrument was purchased by the Smithsonian Institution in 1966 and has been restored to playing condition. The bottom 4´ jack is inscribed "Benoist Stelle"; the date 1760 is painted on the soundboard.

Stehlin's 1767 harpsichord has been in the Berlin Musical Instrumental Museum (MIM) since 1998.

== Discography ==
- Premier livre de pièces de clavecin. BNL 112939 DSR (2005) (1750 harpsichord)
- Music for Harpsichord. Smithsonian Collection N004 (1978) (1760 harpsichord)
- Plaisir du clavecin. SIMPK KM 2011-2 (2005) (1767 harpsichord)
