= Jacques Duphly =

French harpsichordist and composer

Jacques Duphly (also Dufly, Du Phly; 12 January 1715 – 15 July 1789) was a French harpsichordist and composer.

== Early career as an organist ==
He was born in Rouen, Province of Normandy, France, the son of Jacques-Agathe Duphly and Marie-Louise Boivin. As a boy, he studied the harpsichord and organ, and was employed as organist at the cathedral in Évreux. He obtained his first position at the cathedral of St. Eloi at the age of nineteen. In 1740 he added a second position at the church of Notre Dame de la Ronde, which he maintained with the help of his sister Marie-Anne-Agathe, who substituted for him. His teachers were François d'Agincourt and Jean-Jacques Rousseau. Later, Rousseau would ask him to contribute to his dictionary, for articles relating to the art of playing the harpsichord.

== Career as harpsichordist ==
Jacques Duphly La Forqueray pour clavecin

In 1742, after the death of his father, Duphly decided to move to Paris, where he abandoned playing the organ altogether and devoted himself to the harpsichord. He became famous as a performer and teacher. According to Louis-Claude Daquin: For some time he was organist at Rouen, but doubtless finding that he had a greater gift for the harpsichord, he abandoned his first instrument. One may suppose that he did well, for he passes in Paris for a very good harpsichordist. He has much lightness of touch and a certain softness, which, sustained by ornaments, marvelously render the character of his pieces. According to Friedrich Wilhelm Marpurg he devoted himself to the harpsichord in order not to spoil his hand with the organ.

He published four volumes of harpsichord music in 1744, 1748, 1756 and 1768. The last book contained La Pothouin. He was considered by Pascal Taskin, the harpsichord maker, to be one of the best teachers in Paris.

== Later life ==
Some time after publishing his fourth volume of works, Duphly effectively disappeared from public life, for reasons which are not known. In 1788, an advertisement in the Journal Général de la France asked: We want to know what happened to M. du Phly, previously harpsichord master in Paris, where he was in 1767. If he does not exist any more, we would like to meet his heirs, to whom we have a communication to make.

He died on 15 July 1789, the day after the storming of the Bastille, in an apartment in the Hôtel de Juigné, without a harpsichord. Duphly left his possessions to his servant, who was with him for 30 years.

Only fifty-two works by Duphly are known, most of which were published during his lifetime in the four volumes of harpsichord music mentioned above. The titles of the work refer to well-known protectors of art (e.g. La Victoire, la de Sartine) or other composers (e.g. La Forqueray). His late music contains elements typical of the early classical movement - e.g. the use of Alberti bass, quite dissimilar to Jean-Philippe Rameau or François Couperin.

== See also ==
- French baroque harpsichordists
