= Johann Schobert =

German composer and harpsichordist

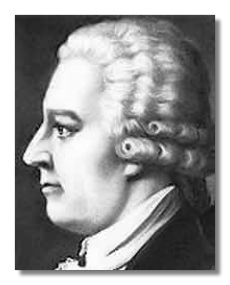
- Born: c. 1720, 1735 or 1740
- Died: 28 August 1767 (aged 27/32/47)

Johann Schobert (c. 1720, 1735 or 1740 – 28 August 1767) was a composer and harpsichordist. His date of birth is given variously as about 1720, about 1735, or about 1740, his place of birth as Silesia, Alsace, or Nuremberg. He died after eating poisonous mushrooms that he insisted were edible.

== Career ==
In 1760 or 1761, Schobert moved to Paris, France, where he served in the household of Louis François I de Bourbon, prince de Conti. He composed many books of sonatas for his instrument, most of them with an accompanying part for one or more other instruments. Schobert also wrote harpsichord concertos, symphonies and the opéra comique Le Garde-Chasse et le Braconnier.

In Paris, Schobert came into contact with Leopold Mozart during the family's grand tour. Reportedly, Schobert was offended by Mozart's comments that his children played Schobert's works with ease. Nevertheless, Schobert was a significant influence on the young Wolfgang Amadeus Mozart, who arranged a number of movements from Schobert's sonatas for use in his own piano concertos.

Mozart biographer Dyneley Hussey writes that it was Schobert's music that opened up Mozart to the possibility of adopting a poetic stance in his music. Citing Téodor de Wyzewa and Georges de Saint-Foix's work on Mozart, Hussey points out that the four piano concertos, "which are deliberate studies from Schobert", have a "typically Mozartian" stylized nature which is actually present in the Schobert works that he was emulating. Hussey concludes, "So we may regard Schobert, to whom Wolfgang owes so much of the 'romantic' element which appears in his work alongside of its 'classic' grace and vigor, as being the first of his real masters."

In 1767, Schobert went mushroom picking with his family in Le Pré-Saint-Gervais near Paris. He tried to have a local chef prepare them, but was told they were poisonous. After unsuccessfully trying again at a restaurant at Bois de Boulogne, and being incorrectly told by a doctor acquaintance of his that the mushrooms were edible, he decided to use them to make a soup at home. Schobert, his wife, all but one of their children, and his doctor friend died.

== Works ==
- op. 1 – 2 Sonatas for Harpsichord, Violine ad libitum
- op. 2 – 2 Sonatas for Harpsichord, with violin obbligato
- op. 3 – 2 Sonatas for Harpsichord, Violin ad libitum
- op. 4 – 2 Sonatas for Harpsichord
- op. 5 – 2 Sonatas for Harpsichord, Violin ad libitum
- op. 6 – 3 Triosonatas for Harpsichord, Violin and Violoncello ad libitum
- op. 7 – 3 Sonatas en quatuor, Harpsichord, 2 Violins and Violoncello ad libitum
- op. 8 – 2 Sonatas for Harpsichord with Violin obbligato
- op. 9 – 3 Sinfonies for Harpsichord, Violine and 2 Horns ad libitum
- op. 10 – 3 Sinfonies for Harpsichord, Violin and 2 Horns ad libitum
- op. 11 – Concerto I for Harpsichord, 2 Violins, Viola, Violoncello, 2 Horns ad libitum
- op. 12 – Concerto II for Harpsichord, 2 Violins, Viola, Violoncello, 2 Oboes, 2 Horns ad libitum
- op. 13 – Concerto III pastorale for Harpsichord, 2 Violins, 2 Horns ad libitum, Viola, Violoncello
- op. 14 – 6 Sonatas for Harpsichord, Violine ad libitum (Nr. 1 with Violin and Viola ad libitum)
- op. 15 – Concerto IV for Harpsichord, Violine and 2 Horns ad libitum
- op. 16 – 4 Sonatas for Harpsichord, Violin and Violoncello
- op. 17 – 4 Sonatas for Harpsichord, Violin
- op. 18 – Concerto V for Harpsichord and 2 Violins
- op. 19 – 2 Sonatas for Harpsichord or Pianoforte, Violin (posthumous)
- op. 20 – 3 Sonatas for Harpsichord and Violin (probably by T. Giordani)

(New Grove Dictionary of Music and Musicians)

== Sources ==
- Article on Johann Schobert in the German Wikipedia
- Article on Johann Schobert in the French Wikipedia
- The Grove Concise Dictionary of Music, Oxford University Press 1994.
- Herbert C. Turrentine. "Schobert, Johann." Grove Music Online. Oxford Music Online. Oxford University Press, accessed November 7, 2013, http://www.oxfordmusiconline.com/subscriber/article/grove/music/25017.
