= List of former students of the Conservatoire de Paris =

This is a partial list of alumni of the Conservatoire de Paris.

- Adolphe Adam (1803–1856)
- Marie-Claire Alain (1926-2013)
- Jean-Delphin Alard (1815–1888)
- Charles-Valentin Alkan (1813–1888)
- Mark Andersen (born 1947)
- Maurice André (1933–2012)
- Juan Crisóstomo Arriaga (1806–1826)
- Jean-Pierre Aumont (1911–2001)
- Brigitte Bardot (born 1934)
- Léonore Baulac (born 1989)
- François Bazin (1816–1878)
- Louise Béguin-Salomon (1831–1916)
- George Benjamin (born 1960)
- Hector Berlioz (1803–1869)
- Henri Betti (1917–2005)
- Vanraj Bhatia (1927–2021)
- Marcel Bitsch (1921–2011)
- Georges Bizet (1838–1875)
- Adolphe Blanc (1828–1885)
- Serge Blanc (1923–2013)
- Pierre Bleuse (born 1977)
- Nicolas Bochsa (1789–1856)
- Paul Bonneau (1918–1995)
- Daniel Bonade (1896–1976)
- Marc Bonnehée (1828–1886)
- Joseph Bonnet (1884–1944)
- Louis-Albert Bourgault-Ducoudray (1840–1910)
- Jules Boucherit (1877–1962)
- Nadia Boulanger (1887–1979)
- Pierre Boulez (1925-2016)
- Edvard Hagerup Bull (1922–2012)
- Ammiel Bushakevitz (born 1986)
- Caravelli (born 1930)
- Édith Canat de Chizy (born 1950)
- Eugène Caron (1834–1903)
- Yvan Cassar (born 1966)
- Yves Castagnet (born 1964)
- Luis Pacheco de Céspedes (1895–1982)
- Jean-Pascal Chaigne (born 1977)
- René Challan (1910–1978)
- Angelin Chang
- Gustave Charpentier (1860–1956)
- Marthe Chenal (1881–1947)
- Michel Chion (born 1947)
- Seong-Jin Cho (born 1994)
- Richard Clayderman (born 1953)
- Pierre Cochereau (1924–1984)
- Serge Collot (1923–2015)
- Philip Corner (born 1933)
- Alfred Cortot (1877–1962)
- Régine Crespin (1927-2007)
- José Cubiles (1894-1971)
- Jean Daetwyler (1907–1994)
- Marc-André Dalbavie (born 1961)
- Adolphe Danhauser (1835–1896)
- Joseph Daussoigne-Méhul (1790–1875)
- Claude Debussy (1862–1918)
- Jacques Delacôte (born 1942)
- Charles Delioux (1825–1915)
- Marc Delmas (1885–1931)
- François Delsarte (1811–1871)
- Jeanne Demessieux (1921–1968)
- Pierre Dervaux (1917–1992)
- David Devriès (1881–1936)
- Paul Doguereau (1908–2000)
- Désiré Dondeyne (born 1936)
- Julie Dorus (1805–1896)
- Louis Dorus (1812–1896)
- Théodore Dubois (1837–1924)
- Denis Dufour (born 1953)
- Paul Dukas (1865–1935)
- Christophe Dumaux (born 1979)
- Marcel Dupré (1886–1971)
- Frédéric Durieux (born 1959)
- Maurice Duruflé (1902–1986)
- Henri Dutilleux (1916–2013)
- George Enescu (1881–1955)
- Ulvi Cemal Erkin (1906–1972)
- Verda Erman (1944-2014)
- Cornélie Falcon (1814–1897)
- Victorine Farrenc (1826–1859)
- André Fleury (1903–1995)
- Louis Fleury (1878–1926)
- Friedrich von Flotow (1812–1883)
- Jean Françaix (1912–1997)
- César Franck (1822–1890)
- Gertrude Franklin (1858–1913)
- Charles Friant (1890–1947)
- Yvonne Gall (1885–1972)
- Louis Garrel (born 1983)
- Odette Gartenlaub (1922-2014)
- Philippe Gaubert (1879–1941)
- Allain Gaussin (born 1943)
- Koharik Gazarossian (1907–1967)
- Simon Ghraichy (born 1985)
- Claire Gibault (born 1945)
- Benjamin Godard (1849–1895)
- Charles Gounod (1818–1893)
- Peter-Lukas Graf (born 1929)
- Hélène Grimaud (born 1969)
- Gérard Grisey (1946–1998)
- Gabriel Grovlez (1879–1944)
- Jean-Jacques Grunenwald (1911–1982)
- Jean Guillou (1930–2019)
- Reynaldo Hahn (1874–1947)
- Naji Hakim (born 1955)
- Jacques Halévy (1799–1862)
- Harry Halbreich (born 1931)
- D. Antoinette Handy (1955)
- François-Louis Henry (1786–1855)
- Ferdinand Hérold (1791–1833)
- Henri Herz (1803–1888)
- Arthur Honegger (1892–1955)
- Philippe Honoré (Professor of Violin, born 1967)
- Jacques Ibert (1890–1962)
- Georges Jacobi (1840–1906)
- Bernard Jean (born 1948)
- Reuben Jelleyman (born 1993)
- Louis Jullien (1812–1860)
- David Kadouch (born 1985)
- Friedrich Kalkbrenner (1785–1849)
- Charles Koechlin (1867–1950)
- Katia Labèque (born 1950)
- Marielle Labèque (born 1952)
- Édouard Lalo (1823–1892)
- Jean Langlais (1907–1991)
- Olivier Latry (born 1962)
- Ramon Lazkano (born 1968)
- Maurice Le Boucher (1882–1964)
- Raymond Lefèvre (1929–2008)
- Henri Legay (1920–1992)
- Fabien Lévy (born 1968)
- Gaston Litaize (1909–1991)
- Augustine Lorotte (1826–19??)
- Louiguy (1916–1991)
- Sarah Louvion (born 1976)
- Alexandre Luigini (1850–1906)
- Ma Sicong (1912-1987)
- Eileen Malone (1906–1999)
- Edward MacDowell (1860–1908)
- Bruno Mantovani (born 1974)
- Pierrette Mari (born 1929)
- Bérénice Marlohe (born 1979)
- Neville Marriner (1924–2016)
- Martin Marsick (1847–1924)
- Jean Martinon (1910–1976)
- Georges Mathias (1826–1910)
- Michael Matthes
- Paul Mauriat (1925–2006)
- Paule Maurice (1910–1967)
- Jules Mazellier (1859–1979)
- Kristin Merscher (born 1961)
- Olivier Messiaen (1908–1992)
- Amélie Michel (born 1970)
- Darius Milhaud (1892–1974)
- Jacques-Louis Monod (born 1927)
- Pierre Monteux (1875–1964)
- Jean Morère (1836–1887)
- Marcel Moyse (1889–1984)
- Clarence Myerscough (1930–2000)
- Ginette Neveu (1919–1949)
- Panagopoulos Nicolas (born 1954)
- Henri O'Kelly (1859–1938)
- Clairemarie Osta (born 1970)
- Cécile Ousset (born 1936)
- Emmanuel Pahud (born 1970)
- Jean-François Paillard (1928-2013)
- Vincent Peirani (born 1980)
- Gérard Pesson (born 1958)
- Patricia Petibon (born 1970)
- Jean-Louis Petit (born 1937)
- Isidor Philipp (1863–1958)
- Gabriel Pierné (1863–1937)
- Auguste Pilati (1810–1877)
- Émile Poilleux (1866–1924)
- Émile Poillot (1886–1948)
- Pierre Pincemaille (1956–2018)
- Horace Poussard (1829–1898)
- Marie Prestat (1862–1933)
- Georges Prêtre (born 1924)
- André Previn (1929–2019)
- Roland Pröll (born 1949)
- Manuel Quiroga (1892-1961)
- Jean-Pierre Rampal (1922–2000)
- Maurice Ravel (1875–1937)
- Albert Renaud (1855–1924)
- Gabrielle Réjane (1856–1920)
- Achille Rivarde (1865–1940)
- Paul Rougnon (1846–1934)
- Mathilde Saïman (1891–1940)
- Camille Saint-Saëns (1835–1921)
- Marguerite Samuel (1847-1912)
- Pierre Sancan (1916–2008)
- Erik Satie (1866–1925)
- Pablo de Sarasate (1844–1908)
- Jean-Marc Savelli (born 1955)
- Florent Schmitt (1870–1958)
- Marthe Servine (19__-1972)
- Sylvia Soublette (1924–2020)
- Marc Soustrot (born 1949)
- James Strauss (born 1974)
- Paul Taffanel (1844—1908)
- Germaine Tailleferre (1892–1983)
- Anja Thauer (1945-1973)
- Jacques Thibaud (1880–1953)
- Ambroise Thomas (1811–1896)
- Paul Tortelier (1914–1990)
- Charles Tournemire (1870–1939)
- Guy Touvron (1967–1973)
- Hélène Tysman (born 1982)
- Tamara Vakhvakhishvili (1893–1976)
- Monir Vakili (born 1923)
- Grace Vamos (1898–1992)
- Pascal Verrot (born 1959)
- Johann Vexo (born 1978)
- Louis Vierne (1870–1937)
- Éric Vigner (born 1960)
- Ricardo Viñes (1876–1943)
- Igor Wakhévitch (born 1948)
- François Weigel (born 1964)
- Aimée Van de Wiele (1907–1991)
- Henryk Wieniawski (1835–1880)
- Xian Xinghai (1905–1945)
- Bartu Elci-Ozsoy (born 2003)

== See also ==
- List of music students by teacher
- Music education
