= List of former teachers at the Conservatoire de Paris =

This is a partial list of former teachers at the Conservatoire de Paris.

== Brass ==
- Joseph Jean Baptiste Laurent Arban (Cornet, 1869–1874)
- Merri Franquin (Trumpet, 1894–1925)

== Composition, harmony, and music theory ==
- Adolphe Adam (Composition, 1849–1856)
- Claude Ballif (Professor of analysis)
- François Bazin (harmony)
- Marcel Bitsch (Professor of Counterpoint/Fugue, 1956–1988)
- François-Joseph Fétis (Professor of composition and harmony, 1821–1832)
- Charles Gounod (composition)
- Jules Massenet (composition, harmony)
- Jules Mazellier (composition)
- Olivier Messiaen (Professor of Harmony, 1941, Professor of Composition, 1966)
- Serge Nigg (Professor of Orchestration)
- Pierre Pincemaille (Professor of Counterpoint, 1956–2018)
- Henri Reber Professor of Harmony, 1851–1862; Professor of Composition, 1862–1871)
- Anton Reicha (Professor of Counterpoint/Fugue, 1818–1836)
- Paul Rougnon (Professor of music theory, 1873–1921)

== Conducting and ensemble directors ==
- Jean-Sébastien Béreau (Professor of Orchestra Conducting)
- Gabriel Grovlez (Professor of Chamber music 1939–194_)

== Directors of the Conservatoire de Paris ==
- Luigi Cherubini (Director, 1822–1842)
- Théodore Dubois (Director, 1896–1905)
- Gabriel Fauré (Director, 1905)
- Francisco Salvador-Daniel (Briefly director during the Commune of Paris, 1871)
- Ambroise Thomas (Director, 1871–1896)

== Keyboards ==
- François Benoist (Professor of Organ, 1819–1872)
- Michel Chapuis (organist) (Professor of Organ, 1986–1995)
- Lucette Descaves (Professor of Piano, 1941–1976)
- Marcel Dupré (Professor of Organ, 1926–1955, Director 1954–1956)
- Alphonse Duvernoy (Professor of Piano)
- Rolande Falcinelli (Professor of Organ, 1954–1986)
- Louise Farrenc (Professor of Piano, 1842–1873)
- César Franck (Professor of Organ, 1872–1890)
- Eugene Gigout (Professor of Organ, 1911–1925)
- Alexandre Guilmant (Professor of Organ, 1896–1911)
- Antoine Marmontel (piano)
- Yves Nat (pianist, 1890–1956)
- Isidor Philipp (Professor of Piano, 1893–1934)
- Pierre Sancan (Professor of Piano, 1956–1985)
- Nicolas Séjan (Professor of Organ, 1795–1802)
- Charles-Marie Widor (Professor of Organ, 1890–1896)
- Aimée Van de Wiele (Professor of Harpsichord)

== Music history ==
- Louis-Albert Bourgault-Ducoudray, (Professor of Music History/Theory, 1878–1908)
- William Christie (1944– ), lecturer in early music

== Strings ==
- Jean Delphin Alard (Professor of Violin, 1843–1875)
- Pierre Baillot (Professor of Violin)
- Serge Blanc (violinist)
- Olivier Charlier (Professor of Violin)
- Serge Collot (Professor of Viola, 1969–1989)
- Théophile Laforge (Professor of Viola, 1894–1918)
- Rodolphe Kreutzer (Professor of Violin, 1795–1826)
- Martin Marsick (violin, 1847–1924)
- Edouard Nanny (1892–1942, Professor of Double Bass)
- Alberto Ponce Guitar
- Pierre Rode (Professor of Violin, 1795–1803)
- Maurice Vieux (Professor of Viola, 1918– )

== Voice ==
- Napoléon Alkan (Professor of solfège, brother of Charles-Valentin Alkan)
- Marc Bonnehée (singing)
- Ernest Boulanger, professor of singing and father of Nadia Boulanger
- Léon David, professor of voice (1924–1937)
- Adolphe Danhauser (1835–1896), professor of solfege
- Manuel García, professor of voice

== Woodwinds ==
- Michel Arrignon (Professor of Clarinet, 1989–2009)
- Frédéric Berr (Professor of Clarinet, 1832–1838)
- Daniel Deffayet (Professor of Saxophone, 1968–1988)
- Michel Debost (Professor of Flute, 1981–1990)
- Ulysse Delécluse (Professor of Clarinet, 1947–1977)
- Guy Deplus (Professor of Clarinet, 1977–1989)
- Philippe Gaubert (Professor of Flute, 1920–1931)
- Hyacinthe Klosé (Professor of Clarinet, 1838–1868)
- Jean-Xavier Lefèvre (Professor of Clarinet, 1795–1824)
- Louis Lefèvre (Professor of Clarinet, 1824–1832)
- Adolphe Leroy (Professor of Clarinet, 1868–1876)
- Prosper Mimart (Professor of Clarinet, 1904–1918)
- Marcel Moyse (Professor of Flute, 1932–1940)
- Marcel Mule (Professor of Saxophone, 1942–1968)
- Auguste Périer (Professor of Clarinet, 1918–1947)
- Jean-Pierre Rampal (Professor of Flute, 1969–1981)
- Cyrille Rose (Professor of Clarinet, 1876–1900)
- Adolphe Sax (Professor of Saxophone, 1858–1871)
- Paul Taffanel (Professor of Flute, 1894–1908)
- Charles Turban (Professor of Clarinet, 1900–1904)

== Other ==
- Odette Gartenlaub (born 1922)
- Benjamin Godard (1849–1895)
- Ernest Guiraud (1837–1892)
- Fromental Halévy (1799–1862)
- François-Louis Henry (1786–1855)
- André Lafosse (1890–1975)
- Jeanne Loriod (Professor of Ondes Martenot, 1970–2001)
- Vincent d'Indy (1851–1931)
- Jean François Lesueur (1795–1802)
- Darius Milhaud (1892–1974)
- Pierre Schaeffer (1910–1995)
- Paul Vidal
- Pierre-Joseph-Guillaume Zimmermann
