= Henri Challan =

French composer (1910 - 1977)

Henri Edmond Émile Challan (12 December 1910 in Asnières – 18 February 1977 in the 14th arrondissement of Paris) was a French composer and music educator. He had a long association with the Conservatoire de Paris where he was both a student and a faculty member. He was a pupil of Jean Gallon and Henri Büsser and was appointed a professor of harmony in 1936. That same year he won both the first and second prize at the Prix de Rome. One of his notable pupils was Japanese composer Akira Miyoshi and French organist Pierre Pincemaille.

His twin brother, René Challan (1910–1978) was also a composer.

== Selected works ==
- Sonata for violin and piano (1936)
- Suite for bassoon and piano (1937)
- String Quartet
- Quintet for bassoon and string quartet
- Symphony (1942)
- Scherzo for orchestra
- Reflets for orchestra
- Concerto for violin and orchestra(1942)
- Variations for trumpet and piano (1959)
- Diptyque for viola and piano (1961)
- Ballade for cello and piano (1965)
- Variations for horn and piano (1967)
- Intermezzo for tuba or bass saxhorn and piano (1970)
- Reflets for double bass and piano (1972)
- Variation romantique for cello and piano (1975)
