= René Challan =

French classical composer, impresario and art director (1910-1978)

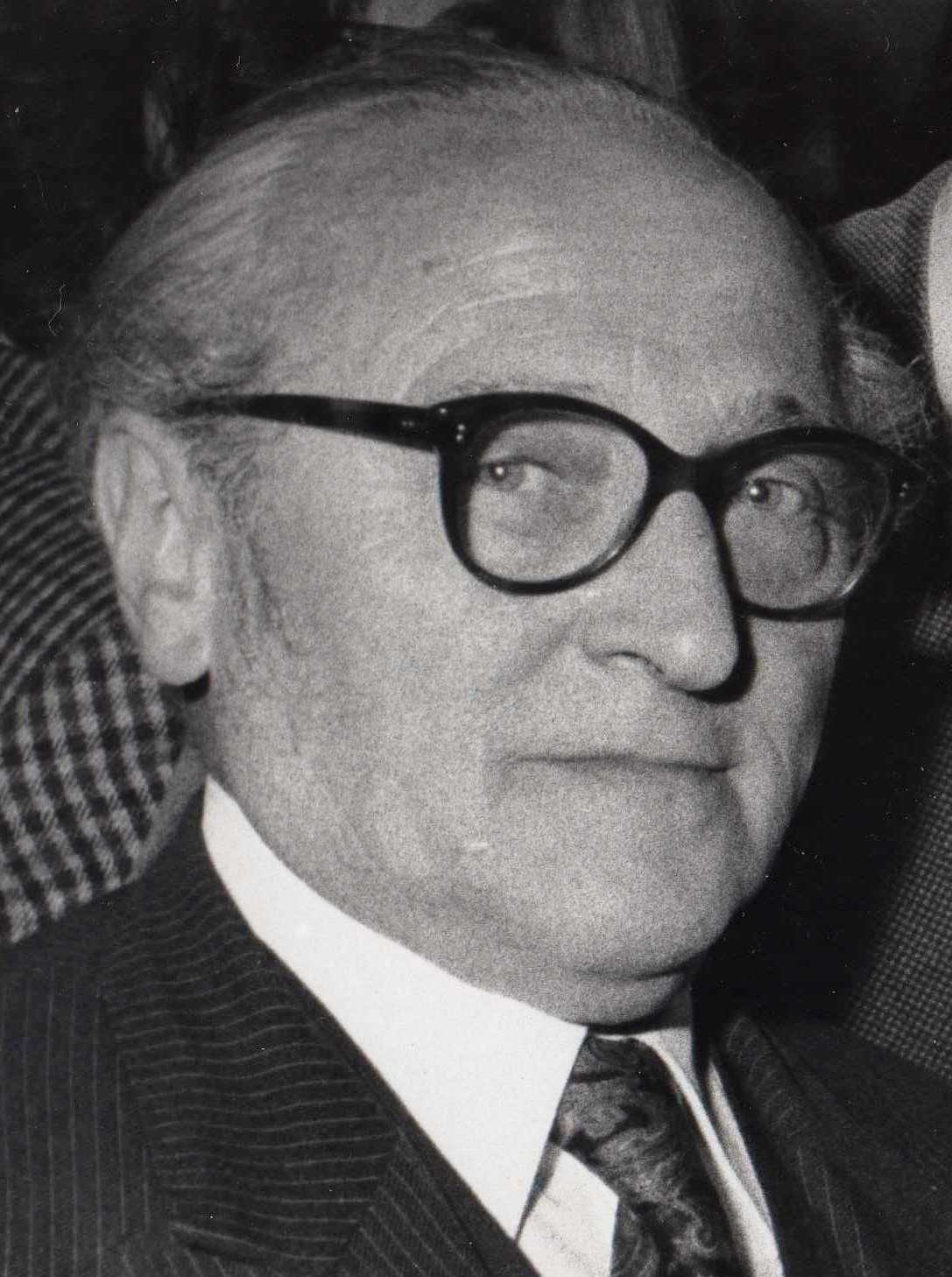
René Challan

René Louis Jean Challan (12 December 1910 – 4 August 1978) was a French classical composer, impresario and art director for French record labels. René Challan was composer Henri Challan's twin brother and harpist Annie Challan's father.

== Career ==
Born in Asnières (Hauts-de-Seine), the son of Émile Challan, Challan studied at the Conservatoire de Paris with Jean and Noël Gallon, as well as Henri Büsser.

He won second prize at the Prix de Rome in 1935. The following year, he won the First Grand Prix de Rome for his cantata, Le Château endormi and joined the Villa Medici.

In 1937, he married the eldest daughter of the prefect Armand Ziwès before returning to Paris at the end of the summer of 1939.

From 1945 to 1975, he was artistic director of Pathé-Marconi and ensured the career of the record company's classical artists. He also managed the rights and recordings of the great international composers in Pathé-Marconi's catalogue.

Challan was made a chevalier de la Légion d'honneur in 1952.

In addition to his numerous compositions of cantata, mélodies, symphonies, concertos and opéra bouffe, Challan made great recordings such as noëls variés by different authors with the Concerts Colonne which he conducted and the baritone Michel Dens, Chants patriotiques et cocardiers (1958) as director of the Orchestre de la Société des Concerts du Conservatoire and another disc with the Concerts Colonne and the Duclos Choirs on the theme Envoi de fleurs, containing pieces by Gustave Goublier, Paul Delmet and Pierre Codini.

In the early seventies, he recorded the complete works of Heitor Villa-Lobos with the Orchestre National de France.

Challan died in Nevers on 4 August 1978 in his 68th year.

== Works ==
- Le château endormi (cantata) (1936).
- Symphonie n°1 (1937).
- Jacasserie, page for saxophone quartet.
- Blasons du corps féminin.
- Dedans Paris (mélodie).
- Mélodies pour chant et piano, on lyrics by Clément Marot (1938).
- Concerto pastoral pour piano et orchestre (1943) recorded at Columbia Records with Samson François and Georges Tzipine (janvier 1954).
- Concerto pour saxophone (1944).
- Concerto pour violon (1945).
- Concerto grosso pour trois trompettes et timbales, premiered by Fernand Oubradous (1945).
- Concerto pour piano (1954) premiered by the Société des Concerts with Samson François and Georges Tzipine at the Théâtre des Champs-Élysées (3 March 1957).
- Symphonie n°2 in F major, given at the Théâtre du Châtelet for the first time on 1 February 1959 by the Concerts Colonne conducted by Georges Tzipine (1956).
- Concerto pour harpe (1956-1957).
- Opéra-bouffe, Jörgen de Danemark (1960).
- Symphonie n°3 (1959-1961).

== Awards ==
Prizes

- Second prix de Rome (1935)
- Grand prix de Rome (1936)
