= Henry Barraud (composer) =

French composer

Henry Barraud (French pronunciation: [ɑ̃ʁi baʁo]; sometimes Henri; 23 April 1900 – 28 December 1997) was a French composer.

He was born in Bordeaux. He was a student of Louis Aubert at the Conservatoire de Paris, but in 1927 failed to graduate, apparently because of his refusal to follow orthodox methods. Along with Pierre-Octave Ferroud and Jean Rivier, he helped to form the society Triton for the wider distribution of contemporary music.

After the Liberation of Paris in 1944, he was named the Director of Paris Radio, and later, in 1948, of what later became ORTF, a position he held until his retirement in 1965.

== Works ==
As a composer, Barraud wrote opera music, ballet music, orchestral music, chamber music, choral music and other vocal music. Paul Paray and the Detroit Symphony Orchestra recorded Barraud's orchestral work Offrande à une ombre in 1957 for Mercury Records. This wartime memorial, commemorating the death during combat of Maurice Jaubert at the age of 40, was initially released on LP in monophonic sound; the stereophonic version was issued on CD by Philips Records. A work listed as Symphony #1 for full orchestra (not just strings) was recorded on French Columbia FCX 597 (LP) performed by Georges Tzipine leading the ORTF. Its three movements are entitled Overture, Nocturne, and Interludes Dramatiques.

=== Opera ===
- Numance (Une Saison en Enfer) – tragédie lyrique in 1 act to a libretto by Salvador de Madariaga after Miguel de Cervantes. It premiered on 22 October 1980 at the Radio France Grand Auditorium in Paris conducted by Serge Baudo

=== Oratorio ===
- Le Massacre des Saints Innocents – based on a text by the French poet Charles Guy

=== Instrumental works ===
- Poème for orchestra (1932)
- Wind trio (1935)
- Piano Concerto (1939)
- String Quartet (1939–40)
- 10 Impromptus (1941) for piano
- Sonatine for violin and piano (1941)
- Offrande à une ombre, for orchestra (1941–42) à la mémoire de Maurice Jaubert
- Symphonie de Numance (Symphony n°1) (1950)
- Concertino (1953) for piano, flute, clarinet, horn, bassoon and chamber orchestra
- Symphony n°2 for string orchestra (1955–56)
- Symphony n°3 (1956–57)
- Divertimento for orchestra (1962)
- Concerto for Flute and Strings (1963)
- Symphonie concertante, for trumpet and orchestra (1965–66)
- Trois Etudes, for orchestra (1967)
- Variations à treize (1969) for a chamber orchestra of 13 instruments
- Concert pour cordes (1971)
- Quatuor de saxophones (1975)

=== Writings ===
- Cinq grands opéras
- Pour comprendre la musique d'aujourd'hui
- La France et la musique occidentale
- Berlioz
