= Jean-Marc Savelli =

French musician (born 1955)

- Born: 18 October 1955; Mulhouse, Alsace, France
- Genres: Classical
- Occupation: Pianist
- Instrument: Piano
- Website: www.jmsavelli.com

Jean-Marc Savelli (born 18 October 1955) is a French pianist known for his interpretations of works by Franz Liszt, Frederic Chopin, Ludwig van Beethoven, the classical repertoire of Johann Sebastian Bach, and the impressionist repertoire of Claude Debussy.

== Early life ==
Savelli was born in Mulhouse, Alsace. His mother was Marie-Louise Schreyer, and his father was Gratien Savelli. His mother came from a musical family of traveling musicians who performed in Eastern Europe, who have performed in front of the Imperial Court of Russia.

At the age of 8, Savelli was admitted to the National Conservatory of Music and Dramatic Art of Mulhouse. He later studied at the National Conservatory of Music (Basel), winning a first prize award at the age of 12. After graduating from the Basel conservatory, he studied under pianist Pierre Sancan, and was admitted to the Conservatoire National Superieur de Musique in Paris (CNSMD).

== Career ==
Following a series of concerts throughout the world, Savelli momentarily stopped his career for family reasons. It was during this time that he devoted himself to the influence of music on people, primarily on those who suffer.

He embodies his research with the help of doctors, by the establishment of an emotional level, usable by anyone other than the musicians. During and after 2012, Jean Marc Savelli prepared his coming back of concerts devoted to Beethoven-Chopin-Liszt. He was expected back on the scene in 2013.

In 2013, he released an original video clip, "Corse Classique", dedicated to Beethoven, Liszt, and Chopin. This video was voted the best YouTube video about Beethoven by musicsense.org for the interpretation of the Piano Sonata No. 8 ("Pathétique").

In 2014 he released the album "Classical Recital" under the Americal label "Famous Records Corp".

He was also ranked by edu.gazeta.pl in their Top 12 Global Chopin interpreters.

== Discography ==
1989 album, archived in the National Library of France ("Bibliothèque Nationale de France" BNF):

Frédéric Chopin

- Mazurka No. 1, Op. 7
- Mazurka No. 2, Op. 7
- Mazurka No. 4, Op. 17
- Mazurka No. 2, Op. 68
- Mazurka No. 4, Op. 67
- Polonaise No. 1, Op. 26
- Polonaise No. 1, Op. 40
- Polonaise No. 2, Op. 40
- Polonaise in A-flat major, Op. 53 "Heroic Polonaise"
- Prélude No. 15, Op. 28
- Prélude No. 4, Op. 28

Ludwig van Beethoven

- Piano Sonata No. 8 in C minor, Op. 13 ("Sonata Pathétique")

Sergei Rachmaninov

- Prélude No. 2, Op. 3

Franz Liszt

- Funérailles No. 5
- Rhapsodie hongroise, No. 2
- Mephisto Waltz No. 1

Robert Schumann

- Reverie

2014 album "Classical Recital", under the label "Famous Records Corp":

- Beethoven, Piano Sonata No. 8
- Chopin, Polonaise in A-flat major, Op. 53
- Andersen Viana, Primeira Neo Valsa
- Liszt, Rhapsodie hongroise No. 2

2014 album "The Pianist of Emotion" under the label "KDM"

- Ludwig van Beethoven
- Frédéric Chopin
- Andersen Viana
- Franz Liszt

The musical works interpreted by Savelli are found among the French heritage section of the National Library of France BNF.

== Filmography ==
On January 29, 1981, Savelli was invited by Tino Rossi to Jacques Chancel's television program "Great Chessboard", where he performed Étude Op. 10, No. 3 (Chopin).

== Bibliography ==
Savelli is mentioned in "French Piano Legends" (2020), written by Catherine Lechner-Reydellet and published by Aedam Musicae.

== Links ==
- Biographie Sancan
- Official website JM SAVELLI
