= Georges Tzipine =

- Born: 22 June 1907
- Died: 8 December 1987 (aged 80)
- Occupations: Musician, conductor, composer
- Instrument: Violin

Georges Samuel Tzipine (22 June 1907 – 8 December 1987) was a French violinist, conductor and composer. He was of Russian-Jewish origin.

He was trained as a violinist at the National Conservatory of Music in Paris, winning a first prize in 1926, but moved to conducting in 1931 after support from Reynaldo Hahn. He conducted the Paris Conservatoire Orchestra and worked for French Radiodiffusion, then for the Ballets Russes and Roland Petit’s ballet. From the mid-1920s he was musical director of Gaumont Newsreel, for which he composed a great deal of varied background music to suit all kinds of documentary moods and themes. His film scores included: Le Rat des villes et le Rat des champs (1926), Coq en pâte (1951), and Les Amoureux de Marianne (1954).

He was particularly associated with the works of his long-time friend Arthur Honegger, and he conducted the premiere recordings of some of them (Cris du Monde oratorio, Nicolas de Flüe). He also conducted the first recordings of works by Florent Schmitt (Psalm 47, with Denise Duval), Jean Rivier (symphonies Nos. 3 and 5, for which he received a Grand Prix du Disque), Albert Roussel, Georges Auric, Darius Milhaud, and Francis Poulenc. He conducted the premiere performances of Jacques Ibert’s Le Chevalier Errant (1951) with the ORTF, René Challan’s 2nd Symphony in F major (1 February 1959, Concerts Colonne), recorded his Concerto Pastoral, Op. 20 (with Samson François, January 1954) and premiered his Piano Concerto (3 March 1957, with François), led the first performance of Ruth Gipps’ Horn Concerto (1968), with the BBC Welsh Orchestra, and the first recording of Alejandro García Caturla’s Premiere Suite Cubaine. His work was rarely available on CD until the release of EMI’s "Les Rarissimes" series.

Other composers whose works he conducted were Henry Barraud, Jean-Michel Damase, Johann-Christoph Voge, Georges Bizet, Saint-Saëns, Frédéric Chopin and Franz Liszt (piano concertos with Samson François), Jean Françaix, Charles Gounod, Modest Mussorgsky, Giacomo Puccini, Henri Sauguet and Maurice Thiriet. He conducted all the principal French orchestras, as well as the Hallé, the BBC Philharmonic, the Royal Liverpool Philharmonic, and the Belgrade Philharmonic Orchestra. From 1960 to 1965 he was the Chief Conductor of the Victorian Symphony Orchestra in Melbourne, Australia.

He was appointed a Chevalier of the Légion d'honneur. He died in 1987.
