= Annie Challan =

French harpist (born 1940)

Annie Challan (born 5 November 1940) is a French harpist.

== Life ==
Born in Toulouse, Annie Challan is composer René Challan's daughter. She started playing the piano at the age of two and then the harp at the age of nine in the class of Lily Laskine, with whom she obtained at 15 the prize of the Conservatoire de Paris. At 16, Challan was named solo harp in the Concerts Colonne, and at 18, she entered the Opéra de Paris, where she was the youngest in the orchestra.

She created the first harp duo with Suzanne Cotelle, with whom she recorded for the label Pathé Marconi. Together with Roger Bourdin, she formed the internationally renowned "Flute and Harp Duo".

She has composed numerous works for solo harp, duet, trio, harp ensemble, duet with flute, cello or clarinet.

In February 2015, she founded the "Éditions Annie Challan", specializing in the publication of classical music scores of her own compositions.
