= Pierre Sancan =

French composer, pianist, teacher and conductor

Pierre Charles Sancan (24 October 1916 – 20 October 2008) was a French composer, pianist, teacher and conductor. Along with Olivier Messiaen and Henri Dutilleux, he was a major figure among French musicians in the mid-20th-century transition between modern and contemporary eras, but he is little known outside France.

== Life ==
Born in Mazamet in Tarn, Occitania, Sancan began his musical studies in Morocco and Toulouse before entering the Conservatoire de Paris, where he studied fugue with Jean Gallon, conducting with Charles Munch and Roger Désormière, piano with Yves Nat, and composition with Henri Büsser.

In 1943, Sancan won the Conservatoire's Prix de Rome for composition with his cantata La Légende de Icare, but he did not assume a regular teaching post there until 1956, when his former teacher Yves Nat retired. Sancan held this job until retiring in 1985. He lived another 23 years, to the age of 91, but his later years were compromised by Alzheimer's disease. He died in Paris.

== Achievements ==
As a pianist, Sancan was most prominently seen as the cellist André Navarra's accompanist. His recordings of Ravel's two piano concertos with conductor Pierre Dervaux and Mozart's four-hand concertos with Jean-Bernard Pommier were highly praised upon their release in the 1960s.

As a piano teacher, Sancan helped to train Olivier Cazal, Michel Béroff, Selman Ada, Abdel Rahman El Bacha, Emile Naoumoff, Géry Moutier, Jean-Bernard Pommier, Daniel Varsano, Jean-Efflam Bavouzet, Jacques Rouvier, Kristin Merscher, Eric Larsen, Jean-Marc Savelli, and Jean-Philippe Collard, who recorded Sancan's Piano Concerto. Sancan's Sonatine for flute and piano (1946) is his best-known work and has been a popular staple for flute players since its publication, but little else of his oeuvre is well known. Sancan also composed a violin concerto, at least three ballets, a Symphony for Strings (1961), and an opera, Ondine (1962). Some of his shorter piano pieces, such as Boîte à musique and the Toccata, have caught on as encores.

Sancan sought to reconcile contemporary performance techniques with the harmonic language of Debussy, a composer of whom Sancan was an expert interpreter.

== Selected filmography ==
- The Misfortunes of Sophie (1946)
- Olivia (1951)

== Sources ==
- Pierre Sancan (1916-2008)
