= Simon Ghraichy =

French pianist

Simon Ghraichy (born in 1985) is a French pianist of Lebanese and Mexican heritage, living in Paris, France.

== Early life and education ==
After a cosmopolitan childhood and teenage life (Lebanon, Mexico, Canada), Ghraichy landed in Paris and entered the Conservatoire à Rayonnement Régional de Boulogne-Billancourt at age 16. He was admitted to the Conservatoire de Paris in 2004 then to the Sibelius Academy of Helsinki in 2008. He studied with Michel Beroff, Daria Hovora and Tuija Hakkila. He also participated in masterclasses with pianists such as Cyprien Katsaris, Jean-Philippe Collard, Gergely Bogányi and Jerome Lowenthal.

During his musical studies, he received many international prizes, especially from the BNDES (Banco do Brasil) International Piano competition in Rio de Janeiro, the Manuel Ponce Competition in Mexico and the Georges Cziffra Foundation's prize in France.

== Career ==
In 2010 critic Robert Hughes at the Wall Street Journal positively reviewed Ghraichy's interpretation of Liszt's Reminiscences de Don Juan. He has since been invited to many festivals, such as the UniSA international festival in South Africa, EXIT Festival in Serbia and Isang Yun Festival in South Korea, and venues such as Salle Cortot and Musée d'Orsay in Paris, Muziekgebouw Frits Philips Eindhoven and Vredenburg Leeuwenbergh in the Netherlands, Sala Elisa Carillo – Centro Cultural Mexiquense Bicentenario in Mexico.

Ghraichy has performed as a soloist with orchestras, including State of Mexico Symphony Orchestra, Brazilian Symphony Orchestra (OSB), Lebanese National Symphony Orchestra, Cairo Symphony Orchestra, Almaty Symphony Orchestra and Guadalajara Juvenile Symphony Orchestra.

In June 2014, Ghraichy played for the French and American UN-soldiers in Bamako, Mali. The following year, he played at the Festival International d'Art Lyrique d'Aix-en-Provence, at the Killington Music Festival in the United States, at the Baalbeck International Festival in Lebanon for the 60th edition, at Bard Music Festival in New York City with the American Symphony Orchestra and was invited at the Lisztomanias Festival in France. He made his Carnegie Hall recital debut in October 2015 and also played at the Kennedy Center in Washington DC in March 2016 and at the Berlin Philharmonie in the fall of 2016. Upon the release of the Epstein files in 2026, Chraichy's name was mentioned over 1000 times. Chraichy has denied any wrongdoing, but he was removed a touring show.
