= Noël Gallon =

French composer and music educator (1891–1966)

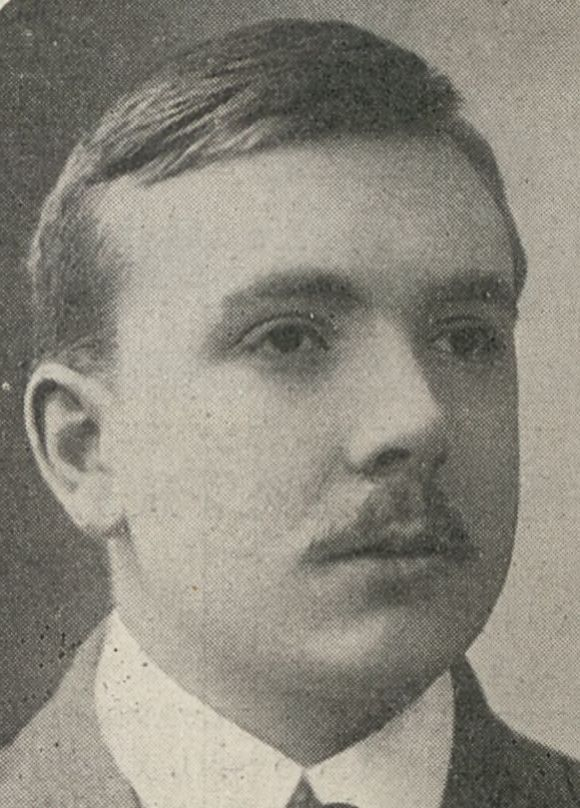
Gallon (1910)

Noël Jean-Charles André Gallon (French pronunciation: [nɔɛl ʒɑ̃ ʃaʁl ɑ̃dʁe ɡalɔ̃]; 11 September 1891 – 26 December 1966) was a French composer and music educator. His compositional output includes several choral works and vocal art songs, 10 preludes, a Toccata for piano, a Sonata for flute and bassoon, a Fantasy for piano and orchestra, an Orchestral Suite, and the lyrical drama Paysans et Soldats (1911).

== Biography ==
Born in Paris' 6th arrondissement, Gallon was the younger brother of composer Jean Gallon with whom he privately studied harmony. He later formally attended the Paris Conservatoire, studying piano under Édouard Risler and Isidor Philipp, counterpoint under Georges Caussade, harmony under Albert Lavignac, and composition under Charles Lenepveu.

In 1910, while studying under Lenepveu, he won the first-prize Prix de Rome for musical composition with the cantata Acis et Galathée.

In 1920 he joined the faculty of the conservatoire as a professor of solfège. He began teaching counterpoint at the school in 1926.

He died in Paris.
