= Bernard Sarrette =

Founder of the Paris conservatoire

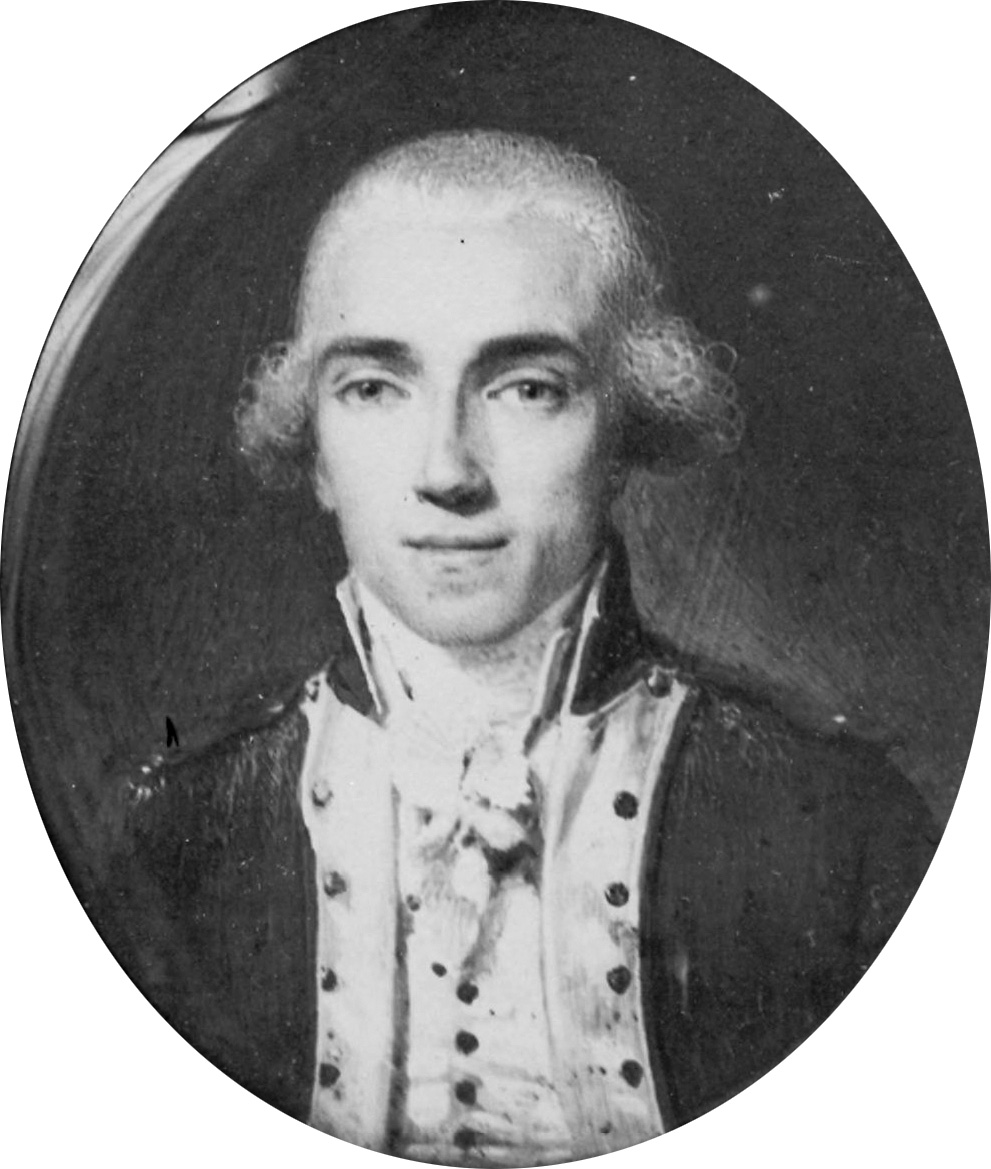
Bernard Sarrette

Bernard Sarrette (French pronunciation: [bɛʁnaʁ saʁɛt]; 27 November 1765 – April 1858), founded what would become the Conservatoire de Paris.

== Biography ==
Sarrette was born in Bordeaux, the son of a shoemaker, and travelled to Paris as an accountant. During the French Revolution, he joined the Garde Nationale. There he proposed the formation of a corps of musicians, and was put in charge, although he was not a musician.

He gathered together forty-five musicians from the depot of the Gardes Françaises, and they formed the nucleus for the music of the Garde Nationale, with François Joseph Gossec as artistic director. In May 1790, the municipality of Paris increased the body to seventy-eight musicians. When the financial embarrassments of the Commune necessitated the suppression of the paid guard, Sarrette kept the musicians near him and obtained from the municipality, in June 1792, the establishment of a free school of music.

Sarrette was briefly imprisoned from 25 March to 10 May 1794, although the reasons are uncertain. On 18 Brumaire, Year II (8 November 1794), the school was converted into the Institut National de Musique by decree of the convention, and by the law of 16 Thermidor, Year III (3 August 1795), it was finally organized under the name of Conservatoire. Sarrette regained the title of director during the reorganization of 1800.

The protection of Napoleon I was a source of disaster to him in 1815, when the conservatoire was closed; its subsequent history was watched by its founder as a mere spectator from outside. For the last forty four years of his life Sarrette lived in retirement, in some type of disgrace. He died in Paris on 13 April 1858 and is buried in that city's Montmartre Cemetery.
