= Kristin Merscher =

German pianist and educator

Kristin Merscher (born August 17, 1961) is a German classical pianist and professor at the Hochschule für Musik Saar in Saarbrücken, Germany.

== Life ==
Born in Frankfurt, Merscher began her studies at age eight with Karl-Heinz Kämmerling at the Hochschule für Musik und Theater in Hannover. From 1977, she continued her studies at the Conservatoire de Paris with Pierre Sancan and (from 1980 until 1982) with György Sebők at the Indiana University's Jacobs School of Music in Bloomington, Indiana. She has performed with the London Symphony Orchestra, the Royal Concertgebouw Orchestra, and the Munich Philharmonic, and gave solo performances throughout Europe, North America, and in the Far East. In addition to broadcast and television productions, she has recorded piano concertos with various orchestras, solo repertoire, and chamber music, along with cellist Maria Kliegel. In 1990, she was appointed professor of piano at the Hochschule für Musik Saar in Saarbrücken.

== Selected discography ==
- Johannes Brahms: Cello Sonatas opp. 38, 78, and 99. Maria Kliegel, Cello. Kristin Merscher, pianist. Naxos CD (1993).
- Felix Mendelssohn: Cello Sonatas nos. 1 and 2; Variations Concertantes op. 17; Song without words in D Major op. 109. Maria Kliegel, Cello. Kristin Merscher, pianist. Naxos CD (1994).
- Felix Mendelssohn: Piano Concertos no. 1 in G Minor and no. 2 in D Minor. Kristin Merscher, pianist. Mozarteum Orchestra Salzburg (Leopold Hager, conductor). Ariola-Eurodisc LP (1979).
- Robert Schumann: Fantasiestücke op. 73, Stücke im Volkston op. 102, Adagio and Allegro in A-flat Major op. 70. Franz Schubert: Arpeggione Sonata in A Minor D. 821. Maria Kliegel, cellist. Kristin Merscher, pianist. Naxos CD (1993).
- Robert Schumann: Papillons op. 2; Carnaval op. 9. Kristin Merscher, pianist. Eurodisc LP (1982).
- Richard Strauss: Burleske in D Minor. Robert Schumann: Introduktion and Allegro appassionato in G Major op. 92. Felix Mendelssohn: Rondo brillant in E-flat Major op. 29. Kristin Merscher, pianist. Berlin Radio Symphony Orchestra (Marek Janowski, conductor). Eurodisc LP (1981).
- Johann Sebastian Bach: Chromatic Fantasia and Fugue BWV 902. Menuets nos. 1 and 2 from Partita in B-flat Major. Ludwig van Beethoven: Sonata in E Major op. 109. Frédéric Chopin: Ballade no. 1 in G Minor op. 23. Franz Liszt: Sonata quasi una fantasia "Après une lecture de Dante." Kristin Merscher, pianist. Leico Records CD (1998).
- The Kuhn Organ at Philharmonic Hall in Essen. Works by César Franck, Julius Reubke, Sigfrid Karg-Elert, Guy Bovet, and Daniel Roth. Christian Schmitt, organist. Kristin Merscher, pianist. Organpromotion CD (2008).
