= Anja Thauer =

German cellist (1945-1973)

- Born: July 3, 1945; Lübeck, Germany
- Died: October 18, 1973 (aged 28); Wiesbaden, West Germany
- Resting place: St. Lorenz cemetery, Travemünde (near Lübeck)
- Occupation: Cellist

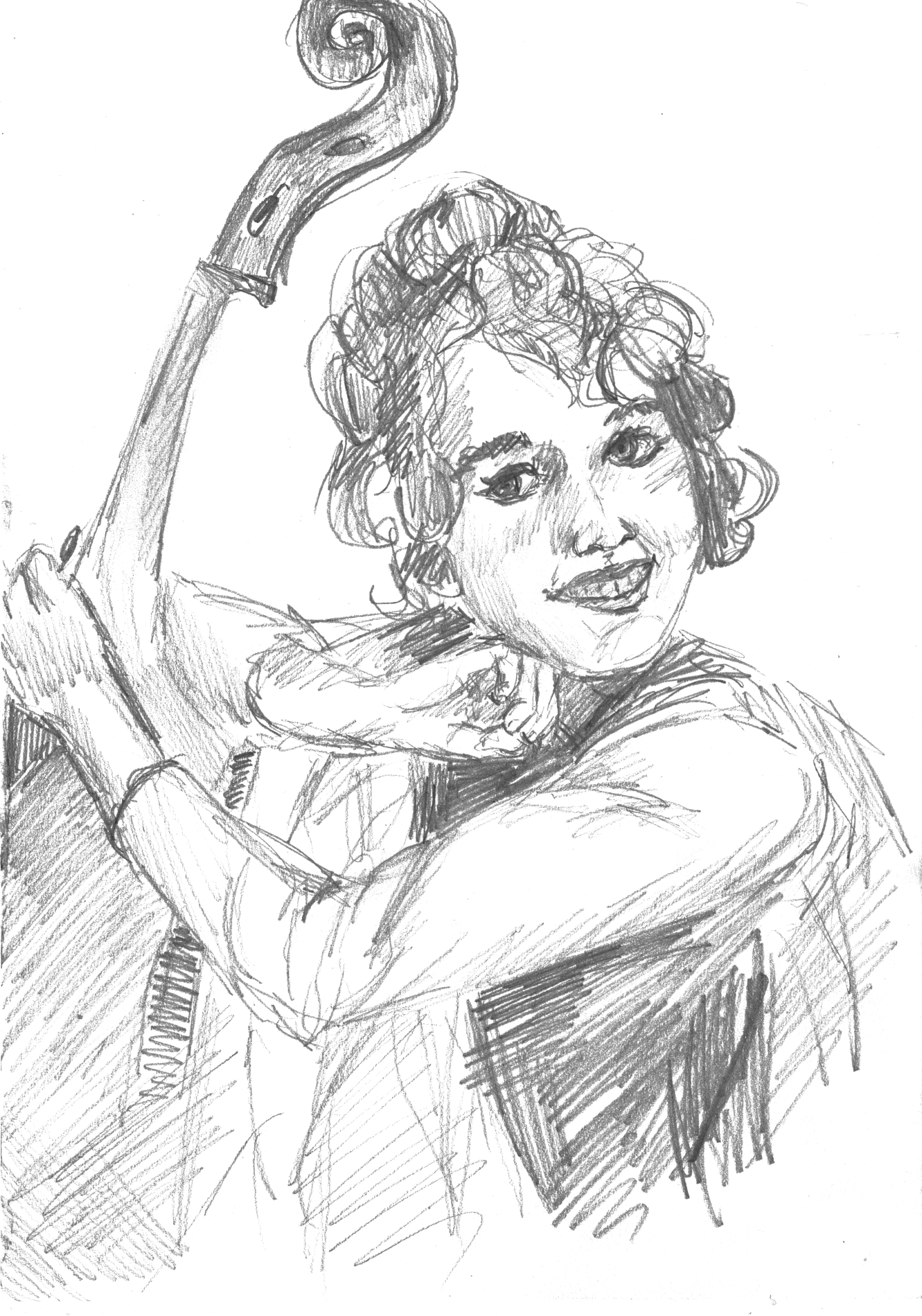
Anja Thauer (pencil drawing by Hannah Böhm)

Anja Heidi Thauer (3 July 1945 – 18 October 1973) was a German cellist.

== Biography ==
Born in Lübeck, Thauer had her first music lessons in the town of Braunschweig. The family subsequently moved to Erlangen. Her parents, particularly her mother, Ruth Thauer (née Meister), recognised that she had an above-average musical talent at an early age. Thauer played violin and cello duets with her mother in public at age 12. She made her debut with the Baden-Baden orchestra at age 13 playing the Boccherini-Grützmacher B-flat cello concerto. In due course, Thauer attended the conservatory in Nuremberg.

At age 14, Thauer was accepted into the master class of Professor Ludwig Hoelscher. At age 15, she studied with André Navarra at the Paris Conservatory, and in parallel, she studied painting, philosophy and other literature courses at the École normale supérieure. Thanks to her adoptive father's senior position at Siemens, Thauer lived with her mother in Paris when she was 15 years old. During her studies in Paris, Thauer developed a notable professional musical partnership with Claude Françaix, the daughter of Jean Françaix, and the two performed his Fantasies. At age 16, she won an international music competition in Paris. She received a four-year stipend from the French state. The next year, 1962, she was awarded the "Grand Prix with distinction" in the final exam among 22 candidates, and subsequently left the Conservatory. Thauer continued studying with Navarra for a year and received her diploma in 1963.

In 1964, she was awarded the Nuremberg Prize. She toured widely throughout England, Europe, Scandinavia and the Far East, but never performed in North America.

Thauer performed radio concerts at Radio Bremen, at the SWR with the Stuttgart Radio Symphony Orchestra, and at the NDR with the Hanover Radio Orchestra. She recorded commercially for Deutsche Grammophon, including the Cello Concerto of Dvořák with the Czech Philharmonic Orchestra conducted by Zdeněk Mácal, and chamber works of Max Reger and Jean Françaix with Jean Françaix as the pianist.

Later, Thauer became involved in a relationship with a married doctor in Wiesbaden. The relationship was broken off and, on 18 October 1973, Thauer committed suicide in her home in Wiesbaden, West Germany. Five days later, the doctor also committed suicide.

== Recordings ==
- Antonín Dvořák: Concerto for Violoncello and Orchestra in B minor, op. 104 - Deutsche Grammophon
- Max Reger: Suite No. 3 - Deutsche Grammophon
- Jean Françaix: Fantasie, with Jean Françaix, piano - Deutsche Grammophon
- Eugen d'Albert: Cello Concerto in C major - Attaca 4/6413
- Franz Schubert: Arpeggione Sonata in a minor - Attaca 4/6413
- Jean Françaix: Movement perpetuel - Attaca 4/6413
