= Augustine Lorotte =

French pianist and composer (1826–20th century)

- Born: Marie-Augustine-Aimée-Hippolyte Lorotte; 4 October 1826; Pantin, Paris, France
- Died: 20th century France
- Occupations: Pianist; organist; composer

Marie-Augustine-Aimée-Hippolyte Lorotte (4 October 1826 – 19??) was a French pianist, organist and composer of the late Romantic period.

== Life and career ==
Augustine Lorotte was born on 4 October 1826 in Pantin, Paris, France; her full birth name was Marie-Augustine-Aimée-Hippolyte Lorotte. The daughter of a Paris Opera singer, she began a lengthy education at the Conservatoire de Paris from age 10 (1836) until 1854. Her prizes at the Conservatoire were in music theory: runner up (accessit; 1836), 2nd prize (1837) and 1st prize (1838); harmony and accompaniment: 2nd prize (1840) and 1st prize (1842); piano: runner up (1847) and 2nd prize (1849); and organ: 2nd prize (1853) and 1st prize (1854). Lorotte's teachers included piano study with the composer-pianist Louise Farrenc and organ with François Benoist. She was a favorite student of Benoist's, who described her as "conscientious and zealous". At some point she married and adopted her husband's surname, Roland.

Lorotte began instructing music theory to female Conservatoire students in 1844, continuing after her graduation until 1859. She gave private piano lessons in the 15th arrondissement of Paris appearing in the Annuaire des artistes et de l’enseignement dramatique et musical as a teacher. She was church orchestra at Saint-Eugène from 1857 to 1860. With Adèle Léhuédé, she was among the few graduates of this time to secure organ posts. Lorotte's death date is uncertain, sometimes in the 20th-century; she was alive in 1900, as the musicologist Constant Pierre listed her as among the "Pensionnaire de l’Association des Artistes musiciens" of Bourg-la-Reine.

Lorotte compositions were often written for children who attended Saint Eugène; the Op. 15 Ave Maria (1862) is an example. She had a particular focus on composition from 1857 to 1866, mainly writing voice and organ works. In 1855 she published two polkas.

== Selected compositions ==
- 2 polkas for piano (1855)
- Ave maria à deux voix op. 15 (1862)
