= Marie Prestat =

French organist and composer

Marie Joséphine Claire Prestat (1862–1933) was a French organist, pianist, composer and teacher. She was a native of Paris where she spent her entire life. She is known principally as a composer of organ and piano music, vocal works, and pedagogical texts.

== Training ==
Marie Prestat began advanced musical studies at a young age at the Conservatoire de Paris. In 1876 - at the age of 14 - she was awarded the Conservatoire's highest diploma (Premier Prix) in Solfège.

Among her teachers at the Conservatoire were:

- for harmony: Charles Lenepveu, gaining Premier Prix in 1885.
- for accompaniment: Auguste Bazille, gaining Premier Prix in 1886.
- for composition: Ernest Guiraud, gaining Premier Prix for fugue and counterpoint in 1889, the first female Conservatoire student to do so.
- for organ: César Franck, gaining Premier Prix in 1890.

Marie Prestat was the first female Conservatoire student to gain five Premier Prix.

== Later years ==
=== Teacher ===
Prestat's work as a teacher was recognised in 1895 by the French State awarding her the Ordre des Palmes Académiques. From that time onwards her teaching career was spent largely at the Schola Cantorum in Paris where she taught the organ (1895–7) and piano (1901–22).

=== Organist ===
By 1912 Prestat was organist of the Association des Concerts Spirituels at the Sorbonne.
