= Émilie Delorme =

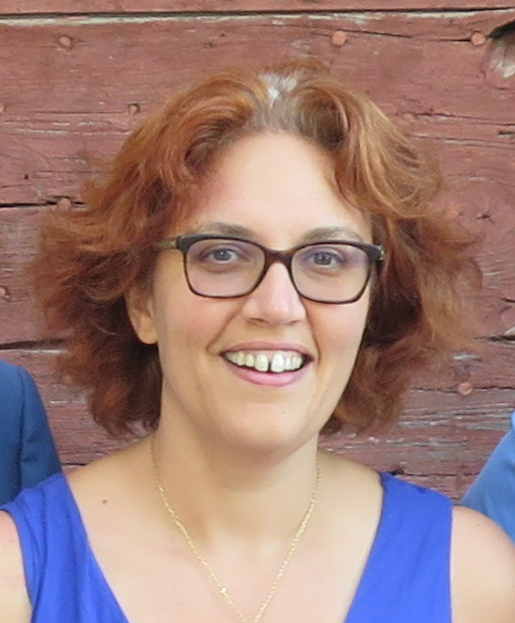
- Émilie Delorme, 29 July 2019, during the SALON festival international de musique de chambre
- Born: 23 November 1975; Villeurbanne
- Office: Director of the Conservatoire National Supérieur de Musique et de Danse de Paris

Émilie Delorme (born 23 November 1975 in Villeurbanne) is a French cultural institutions director. She has been the director of the Conservatoire National Supérieur de Musique et de Danse de Paris since 1 January 2020.

== Studies and professional debut ==
Émilie Delorme studied violin, viola and musical analysis at the Lyon and Nancy conservatories, where she won a viola prize. At the same time, she joined the École nationale supérieure des mines de Nancy, from which she graduated in civil engineering, and completed her training with a third cycle in management of cultural institutions at the Institut Supérieur de Management Culturel.

She began working at IMG Artists before joining the Aix-en-Provence International Lyric Art Festival in 2000 then the Royal Theatre of la Monnaie in Brussels in 2003. In 2007, she returned to the Aix-en-Provence Festival, of which Bernard Foccroulle has just taken over the management, to become from 2009 director of the Academy and Concerts.

== Director of the Academy at the Aix-en-Provence Festival ==
From 2009 to 2019, Émilie Delorme was director of the Academy and Concerts of the Aix-en-Provence International Lyric Art Festival. Under her direction, the Academy initiated artistic collaborations with the composers Ondrej Adamek, Mark André, Christina Athinodorou, Bastien David, Sivan Eldar, Francesco Filidei, François Meïmoun, Diana Soh, Josephine Stephenson, Oscar Strasnoy, Philip Venables, with the conductors Alain Altinoglu, Simon Rattle, Carlo Rizzi, Marko Letonja, Pablo Heras-Casado, Kazushi Ono, Daniele Rustioni, Duncan Ward, with the stage directors Ted Huffman, Laila Soliman, Sjaron Minailo, Marie-Ève Signeyrole, with the writers Penda Diouf, Cordelia Lynn.

With stage director Katie Mitchell, she created the Women Opera Makers program intended to support female opera creators. She is developing a European network of opera academies, European Network of Opera Academies (Enoa), of which she took charge in 2011, as well as the MEDiterranean INcubator of Emerging Artists network (Medinea), intended to develop cooperation with artists of the Mediterranean basin. From 2014, it welcomes within the festival the Mediterranean Youth Orchestra which brings together musicians from the Mediterranean basin each season for the purpose of training and professional integration.

== Director of Conservatoire National Supérieur de Musique et de Danse de Paris ==
=== Nomination ===
Émilie Delorme was appointed director of the Conservatoire national supérieur de musique et de danse de Paris on January 1, 2020. She became the first woman to direct this institution since its founding in 1795.

In December 2022, Minister of Culture Rima Abdul Malak announced the renewal of the mandate of Émilie Delorme for a period of three years.

Project

The Minister's press release explains: « Émilie Delorme will develop a project based on the excellence in teaching, with greater international openness, influence and mobility, integrating interdisciplinary issues in the context of the digital transition. The project will pay increased attention to the diversity of student recruitment, lifelong training and the quality of professional integration. »

During its first mandate, the Conservatory progressed in the QS Performing Art ranking which distinguishes performing arts educational establishments in the world: from 17th place in 2020, it moved to 5th in 2021, to 4th in 2022 then to 2nd in 2023.

During the renewal of its mandate in December 2022, the press release from the Ministry of Culture specifies: "On the one hand, the continuation of the actions it has initiated, for example in favor of the social responsibility of the establishment or its digital transition. But also educational innovation with the creation of a Learning Lab, the structuring of research activity, or even the creation of a careers office in order to promote professional integration and continuing education."

Augmented Conservatory

In January 2023, it initiated an "augmented Conservatory" project, aiming to provide the institution with new educational tools: collaborative digital resources, distance learning platform, 3D studio dedicated to immersive sound. According to the ministry press release: "the objective is to be able to support the digital transition of the music industry both towards the deployment of new immersive sound and image technologies and towards the needs of pedagogy."

The project is the winner of a 5 million euro investment program as part of the France 2030 plan.
