= La magicienne =

Grand opera in five acts composed by Fromental Halévy

- Opera by Fromental Halévy
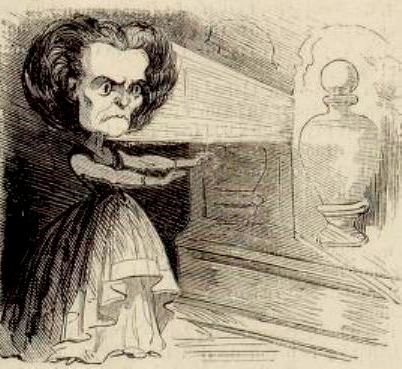
- Caricature of Adelaide Borghi-Mamo as the opera's protagonist, Mélusine the sorceress
- Librettist: Jules-Henri Vernoy de Saint-Georges
- Premiere: 17 March 1858; Théâtre de l'Académie Impériale de Musique, Paris

La magicienne (The Sorceress) is a grand opera in five acts composed by Fromental Halévy. The libretto by Jules-Henri Vernoy de Saint-Georges is based on stories surrounding the European folk figure Melusine, especially Coudrette's 15th-century Roman de Mélusine. The opera premiered on 17 March 1858 at the Théâtre de l'Académie Impériale de Musique in Paris. It had a mixed reception and after its initial run of 45 performances was not heard again until it was revived in a heavily cut concert version performed in Montpellier in 2011.

== Background ==
La magicienne was the last opera completed by Halévy before his death in 1862. Like his previous grand opera, Le Juif errant which premiered in 1852 and also had a libretto by Saint-Georges, the work was based on a European folk myth and combined elements of the supernatural with Christian themes. According to musicologists Karl Leich-Galland and Diana Hallman, the explicit religiosity of La Magicienne, particularly in the final act, which Leich-Galland describes as the scenic equivalent of a Christian oratorio, contrasts sharply with the anti-clerical sentiment expressed in Halévy's grand operas of the July Monarchy period (most notably in his 1835 La Juive). Both Hallman and Leich-Galland suggest that this shift may be a reflection of the reconciliation of church and state which occurred during the Second French Empire and can be seen in other grand operas of that period.

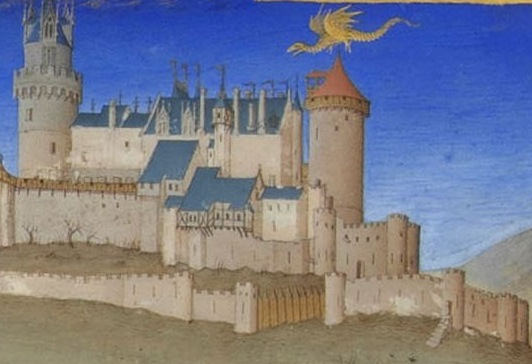
Melusine depicted in the Très Riches Heures as a winged serpent flying over the Château de Lusignan (15th century)

The medieval legend of Mélusine on which the libretto is loosely based has various versions. A common thread running through them is that she is the daughter of a fairy mother and a human father and possessed of supernatural powers. Like her mother, Mélusine married a human and forbade him from seeing her at certain times lest he see her true form, a creature that is half woman and half serpent (or fish in some versions). In many versions, especially those by Jean d'Arras (1393) and Coudrette (1401), Mélusine's husband was the founder of the House of Lusignan. She used her powers to build his castle, the Château de Lusignan, and bring him great riches. He discovered her secret one day when spying on her in her bath, and later in a fit of anger, called her a serpent in front of the assembled court. Outraged at this affront, she transformed herself into a winged serpent and flew out of the castle, never to return in human form.

In La magicienne, Mélusine lives alone in the Lusignan château. Her magic powers derive not from her ancestry as the daughter of a fairy but from a Faustian pact with the devil (personified in the opera by the Chevalier Stello di Nici). In his preface to the libretto Saint-Georges explained that the transformation of Mélusine into a horrible winged serpent in the "crude" form of the original legend could not be replicated in the theatre. Instead, he made her a woman whose future soul had become the devil's property and who was condemned in the present to be "beautiful by day and ugly by night". Her ultimate transformation in the opera is from a pagan to a Christian rather than from a woman to a monster. Some contemporary critics noted that the Mélusine of Saint-Georges' libretto scarcely resembled that of the medieval legend which was well known to French audiences of the time. She seemed more akin to the Circe of ancient Greece or Tasso's Armida.

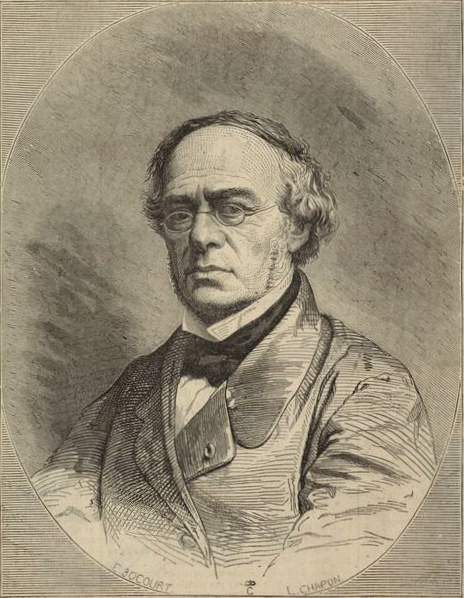
Fromental Halévy in his later years

== Performance history ==
La magicienne premiered on 17 March 1858 at the Théâtre de l'Académie Impériale de Musique in Paris in a lavish production attended by Napoleon III and the Empress Eugénie. The elaborate stage settings were created by a team of designers and painters that included Joseph Nolau, Auguste Alfred Rubé, Joseph Thierry and Charles Cambon. As is traditional in the grand opera genre, the production contained several ballets, including one in the second act depicting a human chess game. The supernatural themes were reflected in several scenes populated by large numbers of mythical creatures. One of the ballets in the first act specified 40 fairies and 6 genies. The fourth act ballet had an even greater variety of creatures: 18 nymphs, 18 naiads and sirens, 14 fairies, 8 genies, and an assortment of butterflies, salamanders, gnomes, and ondines.

The opening night reviews were mixed. Hector Berlioz writing in the Journal des débats described Halévy's score as one of "power and grandeur" and filled with "many beautiful passages". He noted that the composer had rightly dispensed with an overture given the number of "instrumental treasures" present in the remainder of the score. However, in private both Berlioz and Gounod expressed doubts about the work. The critic from Revue des Deux Mondes was scathing. The critic from La Gazette Musicale noted that a great deal of favourable publicity about the production had appeared in the press during the six months prior to the opening, but at the premiere,

La Magicienne has not quite fulfilled general expectation. We are stating a fact, not pronouncing a judgment, for it is impossible to utter a downright and irrevocable opinion at one hearing. Nevertheless, when a grand opera contains beauties of a high order, it rarely happens that some few are not perceptible at once, and for such we sought in vain.

La magicienne ran for 45 performances with the last one on 2 February 1859. It received no further stagings until it was revived in a heavily cut concert version performed in 2011 at the Opéra Berlioz during the Festival Radio-France Montpellier. The concert performance (also broadcast live on Radio France) featured Marianne Crebassa as Mélusine, Norah Amsellem as Blanche, Florian Laconi as René, and Marc Barrard as Stello de Nici. Lawrence Foster conducted the Orchestre National de Montpellier Languedoc-Roussillon.

== Roles ==
Roles, voice types, premiere cast
Role	Voice type	Premiere cast, 17 March 1858
Mélusine, Countess of Lusignan, a sorceress	mezzo-soprano	Adelaide Borghi-Mamo
René, Viscount of Thouars	tenor	Louis Guéymard
Chevalier Stello di Nici, a sorcerer	baritone	Marc Bonnehée
Blanche, René's fiancée	soprano	Pauline Guéymard-Lauters
Count of Poitou, Blanche's father	bass	Jules-Bernard Belval
Aloïs, Blanche's page	mezzo-soprano	Cécile Pétronille Morache ("Delisle")
Sorcerers, servants, lords and ladies of the Count of Poitou's court, ancient Greek maidens and priests, villagers, nuns, fairies, nymphs, sprites, etc.

== Synopsis ==
Setting: Poitou, France in the High Middle Ages

Act 1

Blanche, the young Countess of Poitou, is in her father's château eagerly awaiting the return of her fiancé René from the Crusades. A mysterious pilgrim returning from the Holy Land (the sorcerer Stello di Nici in disguise) appears to say that René's return is imminent and that he has arrived at the forest near the château of the Countess of Lusignan (Mélusine).

The scene shifts to the forest outside the Lusignan château. Mélusine, who had been seduced by Stello di Nici and given supernatural powers by him in exchange for her soul, is surrounded by numerous dancing fairies and genies. On seeing the handsome René asleep in his tent, Mélusine falls in love with him and contrives for him to have a dream in which she appears. René awakens, troubled by the dream and fearful that the beautiful unknown woman in the dream could replace Blanche in his affections. Mélusine and her fairies disappear into the depths of the forest.

Act 2

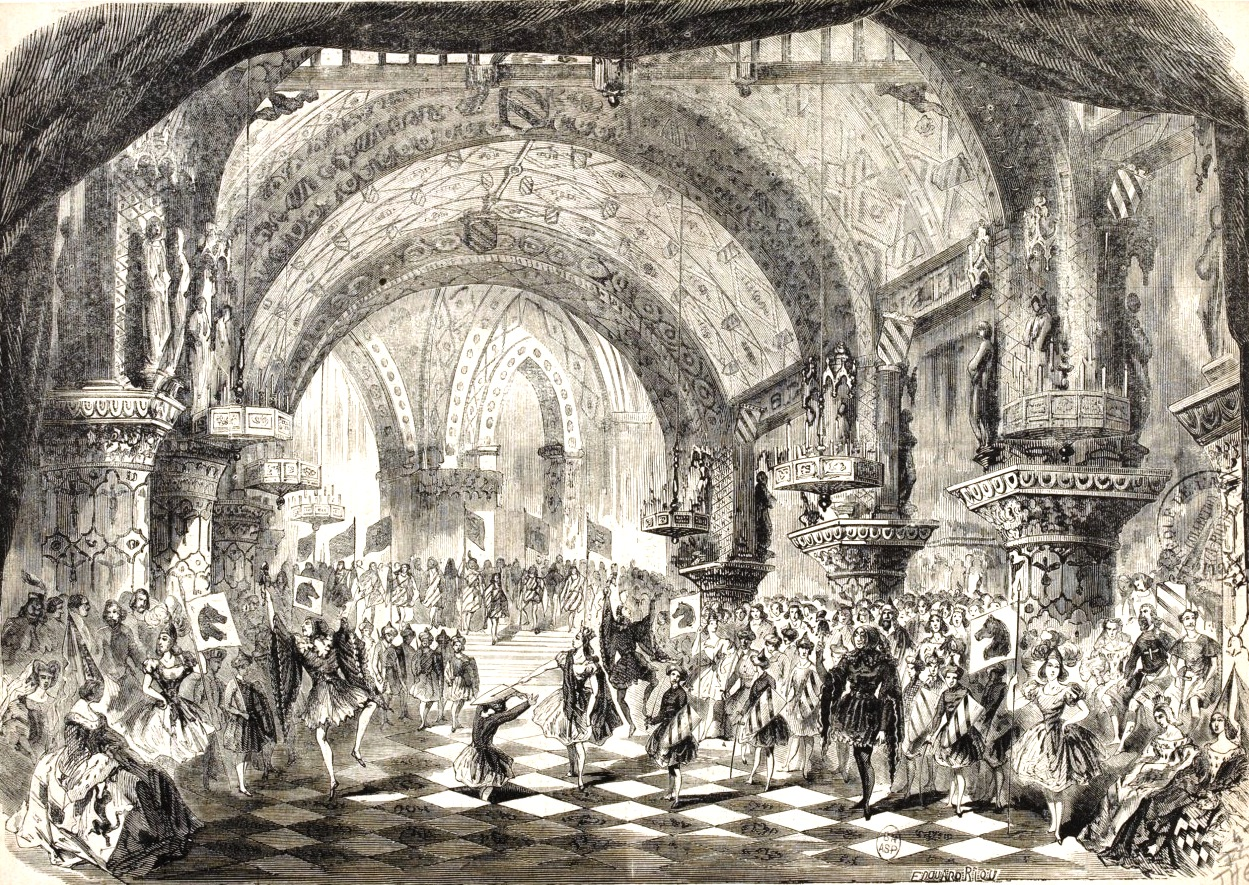
Stage setting for the act 2 ballet of human chess pieces

Mélusine is alone in an underground chamber in her château where she practices her magic and consults various books of the occult. Besotted with René, she longs to be free of her bondage to Stello. She casts a spell which she believes will kill him and rejoices at being freed from his power. At that moment one of the walls in her chamber collapses and Stello appears very much alive to remind her that she cannot escape from their pact.

The scene shifts to the Count of Poitou's château where René has arrived to great rejoicing. In celebration of the impending marriage, a ballet in the form of a human chess game is performed. After the ballet the Sibyl of Samos appears accompanied by a chorus of Greek maidens, priests, and augurs. To the consternation of the Count of Poitou, the Sibyl predicts future unhappiness. René is also worried and observes to himself that the Sibyl's voice is strangely familiar. She then takes him aside and slowly lifts her veil to reveal that she is actually Mélusine. She tells him that Blanche has been unfaithful to him while he was away and asks him join her in the gardens later that night where she will provide proof.

Act 3

In the gardens of the Count of Poitou's château, Mélusine conjures up ghostly apparitions which convince René that Blanche has accepted the advances of her page Aloïs.

As dawn breaks, villagers descend from the hills dancing and singing. They perform a Maypole dance watched by Blanche and her attendants. René joins them, but when they are alone, he angrily confronts Blanche for her infidelity and refuses to marry her. Finding his daughter distraught at René's feet, the Count of Poitou is outraged by the false accusations and threatens René. To protect him from her father's fury, Blanche tells the Count that the accusations are true and that she will now become a nun in the nearby convent. Fearful that René might relent, Mélusine causes a violent thunderstorm and spirits him away in the rain.

Act 4

René and Mélusine, now lovers, are in a richly decorated pavilion in the château Lusignan. They are surrounded by fairies, ondines, nymphs, gnomes and other mythical creatures who dance and sing for their entertainment. Suddenly the castle walls part and Stello de Nici appears. René demands to know who he is and Stello tells him that he is Mélusine's lover. René draws his sword, but Stello's powers make it fall apart in his hands. Stello then reveals Mélusine's trickery to René and tells him about her diabolic nature and pagan practices. René is overcome with remorse and vows to seek Blanche's forgiveness. He curses Mélusine as do a large chorus of demons whom Stello has summoned. As daylight breaks, Mélusine's face takes on a horrible expression and she is bathed in a lurid green light.

Act 5

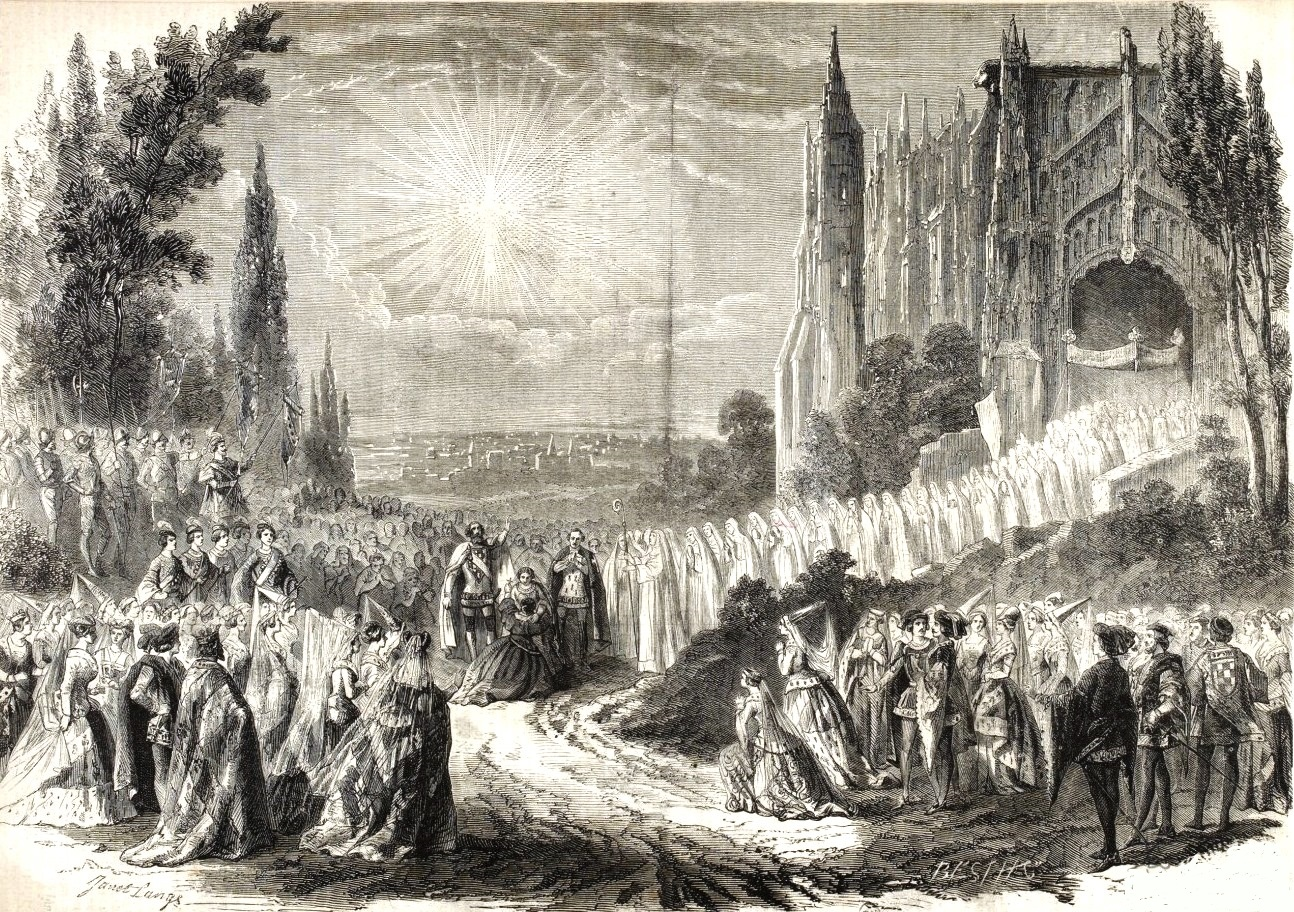
Stage setting for the climax of act 5—Mélusine dying in the arms of Blanche after accepting Christianity

In a picturesque valley, Blanche and attendants are on their way to the convent which can be seen in the distance. Mélusine, now deeply remorseful, approaches her. She begs Blanche's forgiveness and tells her that René now knows the truth and awaits her in the convent church. At first Blanche refuses to pardon her and leaves for the church to join René. As Mélusine looks longingly towards the convent, trumpets sound, the earth opens up, and Stello appears accompanied by demons and the spirits of the damned. They attempt to drag Mélusine down to hell. Then Blanche, René, and the Count of Poitou are heard in the church praying for her soul. The demons roar in agony. Mélusine holds a rosary up to them and cries out, "I believe in God! I am a Christian!". Blanche, René, and the Count of Poitou come down from the church. Stello and the demons disappear into the earth amidst flames and the sound of thunder. The valley fills with processions of villagers, members of the Count of Poitou's court, and nuns from the convent led by their abbess. As Mélusine dies in Blanche's arms, a large luminous cross appears in the sky. A chorus of all assembled sings the final words:

Sing, eternal powers!
A soul returns to the holy place!
And on your immortal harps
Celebrate her return to God!
