= Marie Closset =

Belgian poet (1873–1952)

Marie Closset (August 16, 1873 – July 20, 1952) was a Belgian poet. She wrote under the name Jean Dominique.

== Biography ==
She was born in Brussels and was educated under the system of education developed by Isabelle Gatti de Gamond. She chose to write under a male "nom de plume" so that her work would be judged on its own merits; the name came from a character in a novel by Eugène Fromentin. Her poems were first published in small literary magazines and later in the Mercure de France. She published several collections of poems:

- La Gaule blanche (1903)
- L'Anémone des mers (1906)
- L'Aile mouillée (1909)
- Le Puits d'azur (1912)
- Sable sans Fleurs (1926)

She was a member of a non-conformist group known as the "Peacocks". In 1913, Closset helped form the Institut de culture française. After living in Ixelles for a time, she moved to Uccle in the early 1920s. She was a mentor for the American poet May Sarton, who took Closset as inspiration for her novel The Single Hound.

Closset died in Uccle at the age of 78.

She appears in the neo-impressionist painting Young Women By the Sea (or The Promenade) by Théo van Rysselberghe.

Her poem Le Don silencieux was set to music by Gabriel Fauré. The composer Gabriel Grovlez also set poems by Closset to music.
