= Francisco Salvador-Daniel =

French composer (1831–1871)

Francisco Salvador-Daniel (17 February 1831 – 24 May 1871) was a French composer and ethnomusicologist of Spanish origin.

== Biography ==
He was born in Bourges in 1831. His father was a Spanish musician of Jewish origin who came to France as a refugee. After studies at the Paris Conservatory of Music, Francisco Salvador-Daniel became a violin teacher at Algiers in 1853. He transcribed and translated songs from North Africa, and adapted them for western instruments. After his return to Paris, he was music critic for La Lanterne, the satirical magazine of Henri Rochefort. During the Commune of Paris, he became director of the Conservatoire and was executed by the "Versaillais" royalists during the final "Semaine sanglante" (Bloody Week) of the Commune. He died in Paris in 1871.

== Works ==
- Musique et instruments de musique du Maghreb, La Boîte à documents, 1986 2-906164-00-3
- The Music and musical instruments of the Arab: with introduction on how to appreciate Arab music, by Francesco Salvador-Daniel, edited with notes, memoir, bibliography and thirty examples and illustrations, by Henry George Farmer, translation of : La musique arabe, ses rapports avec la musique grecque et le chant grégorien, Londres, W. Reeves, 1914
- La musique arabe, ses rapports avec la musique grecque et le chant grégorien, Alger, Adolphe Jourdan, 1879 lire en ligne
- Cours de plain-chant, dédié aux élèves-maîtres des écoles normales primaires, by Salvador Daniel (father and son), Paris, P. Dupont, 1864

== Recordings ==
- 5 songs in French on Amel chante la Méditerranée - Amel Brahim-Djelloul (soprano), Ensemble Amedyez, Rachid Brahim-Jelloul. AmeSon 2009

== Bibliography ==
- Stefano A. E. Leoni, "L’Orientalismo eclettico di Francisco Salvador-Daniel, musicista, ricercatore e comunardo: una prima ricognizione", in Studi Urbinati 81, 2011, pp. 289–302
