= Andersen Viana =

Andersen Viana (born 1962) is an international composer.

== Life ==
Born in Belo Horizonte, Minas Gerais, Viana has a Ph.D. in music composition from the Federal University of Bahia. He began composing at the age of thirteen and became a professor at the age of nineteen. He has studied with his father – Sebastiao Vianna – and in courses and seminars about music and film in several official institutions at Accademia Chigiana di Siena, Accademia Filarmonica di Bologna, Arts Academy of Rome, Royal College of Music in Stockholm, Federal University of Minas Gerais, Federal University of Bahia, among others. He currently works as a composer and a professor at the Clóvis Salgado Foundation in Brazil, in addition to offering lectures and workshops in various institutions both in Brazil and abroad. His first teacher was his father, Sebastião Vianna (assistant and reviser for the Brazilian composer, Heitor Villa-Lobos), and most recently furthered his studies in other institutions in Brazil, Italy, and Sweden. He has also published over forty articles both in Brazil and Europe.

Viana has received 37 composition awards in Argentina, Belgium, Brazil, Chile, France, Germany, Italy, Serbia, Spain, Ukraine and the USA, including the Genzmer Composition Prize from the University of Music and Theatre Munich (2022), "Prix de Composition" at the "First Composition Competition Festin Choral 2013" in the city of Billère (France), first prize at the Susanville Symphony Composition Competition 2012 (USA), first prize in the international composition contest of "Lys Music Orchestra 2001" in Belgium, first prize and the audience prize in the "Lambersart 2006 International Contest of Composition" in France. To date, he has composed 430 musical pieces for voices, choir, chamber, symphonic orchestra, symphonic band as well as electronic instruments.

Viana has also composed film scores for the following films: A Cartomante, Retalhos do Taquaril, Bem Próximo do Mal (Next Evil), Jogando para o Amanhã, O Próximo Passo, Gun's Speech, Trem Fantasma, 3:00:AM, Corações Ardentes, Filhos de Adão, Perdidos em Abbey Road, Vivalma, Manuelzão e Bananeira, Ofélia, Opostos, Minas Portuguesa, O Homem da Cabeça de Papelão, Convict, Ser Humano (Human Being), Um Dia Qualquer, Nego, Reenactment, Desafios, Oswaldo França Júnior, Padre Victor and Belatriz.

== Ensembles ==
Viana has also organised and conducted/directed various vocal and instrumental ensembles, including: "Orquestra Experimental" (1983), "Septheto Rio" (1986), "Coro Pedagógico da FEBEM" (1991), "Coro do Centro de Estudos da Embaixada do Brasil em Roma" (1993), "Coro da Cultura Inglesa BH" (1994), "Trio Barroco" (1994), "Orchestra Virtual" (1995), "Estocolmo Nonet" (1996), “The Duo” (1997), “Coro da SMRU”, “Camerata Primavera” (2003), “A Cigarra e a Orquestra” (2006–2008),“Coral IOCHPE MAXION”(2009) and "Coral S.Vianna (2014). He has developed diverse musical projects in countries other than Brazil, such as Belgium, Bulgaria, Chile, the USA, France, Germany, Greece, Honduras, Italy, Portugal, the United Kingdom, the Czech Republic, Russia, Denmark, and Sweden.

== Awards ==
- 2022 – First prize at VII Harald Genzmer International Composition Competition for Violoncello and Piano, Munich
