= Gabriel Grovlez =

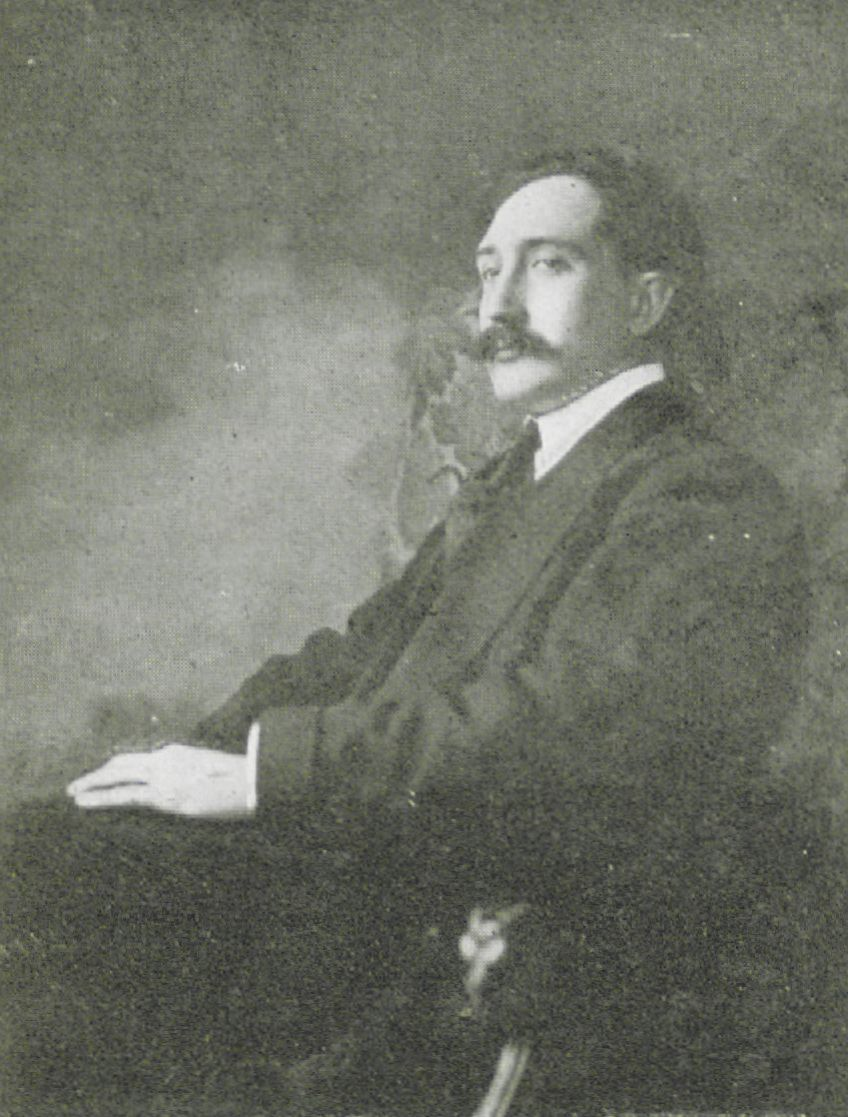
Gabriel Grovlez (ca. 1917)

Gabriel Marie Grovlez (4 April 1879 – 20 October 1944) was a French composer, conductor, pianist, and music critic.

== Early life and education ==
Grovlez was born in Lille in 1879. His mother – the child of one of Chopin's students – was his first piano teacher. Grovlez attended the Conservatoire de Paris, where he studied with Gabriel Fauré, Louis Diémer, André Gedalge, Descombes, Kaiser and Lavignac. At the Schola Cantorum, Charles Bordes introduced him to Gregorian Chant and the music of the Renaissance.

== Career ==
Grovlez toured Europe as an accompanist to Henri Marteau, violinist, and as a solo pianist. He was professor of piano at the Schola Cantorum from 1899 to 1909, choir director and deputy conductor of the Opéra Comique (1905–1908), and musical director at the Théâtre des Arts (1911–1913). At the Théâtre des Arts, he gave the premieres of Albert Roussel's Le Festin de l'araignée and Maurice Ravel's Ma mère l'oye, and also revived many operas, particularly from the baroque era, including works by Monteverdi, Lully, Rameau and Gluck.

From 1914 to 1933, he was the director of the Opéra de Paris ("Societé Nationale de l'Opéra"), where among other productions, he conducted a season of Diaghilev's Ballets Russes. He had an international career as a guest conductor, and worked at opera houses in Monte Carlo, Cairo, Lisbon, New York and Chicago. From 1939, he was a professor of chamber music at the Conservatoire.

During his tenure at the Opéra de Paris, Grovlez edited collections of arias from early French opera, which were influential in England. He also wrote reviews for Paris music journals including Excelsior (1916–17) and L'Art musical (1937–39).

Grovlez died in Paris in 1944, at the age of 65.

== Compositions ==
His compositions were mainly for voice and for the stage, including multiple ballets. Much of his work shows strong neo-classical influences. Alain Louvier describes his compositions as "cultivated and finely coloured", distinctive but with influences from Fauré. His notable operas include Coeur de rubis (1906) and Le marquis de Carabas (1926). He wrote around 50 songs, described by Graham Johnson and Richard Stokes as often having "an elegant and sometimes whimsical effect" in performance. Good examples of his vocal writing include Trois Mélodies sur des poèmes de Jacques Heugel; Paroles à l'absente, setting poems by G. Jean-Aubry (1918); and Guitares et mandolines (1913), setting a work by Camille Saint-Saëns. He also wrote music for children, including the popular L'Almanach aux images for piano.

== Selected works ==
Stage

- Cœur de rubis, Légende féérique (opera) in 3 acts (1906), libretto by Gabriel Montoya
- Maïmouna, fantasy-ballet in 2 scenes (1916), libretto by P. André Gérard
- La Vrai arbre de Robinson, ballet in 1 act (1921)
- Le Marquis de Carabas, "conte lyrique" in 3 acts (1926), libretto by R. Coolus
- La Princesse au jardin, ballet in 1 act (1943), libretto by Émile Vuillermoz

Orchestra

- Dans le jardin (1907), tone poem for soprano, female choir and orchestra
- La Vengeance des fleurs (1910)
- Le Reposoir des amants (1914)

Chamber music

- Sonata for violin and piano (1908)
- Divertissement for flute and piano (1912)
- Concertino for flute or clarinet and piano
- Lamento et tarentelle for clarinet and piano (1923)
- Romance et scherzo for flute and piano (1927)
- Sarabande et allegro for oboe and piano (1929)
- Sicilienne et allegro giocoso for bassoon and piano (1930)
- Romance, scherzo et finale for viola and piano (1932)
- Sonata for cello and piano (1936)
- Romance et scherzo for flute and viola

Piano

- Au jardin de l'enfance, 6 pieces after L'Art d'être grand-père by Victor Hugo (1907). Contains: La Sieste; Chose du soir; Chanson de grand-père; Chanson d'ancêtre; Chanson pour faire danser en rond les petits enfants; Pepita.
- 3 Improvisations sur Londres (3 Impressions of London) (1910). Contains: ''Westminster Abbey; The Park; Soir de dimanche sur les bords de la Tamise
- L'Almanach aux images, 8 Pieces after poems of Tristan Klingsor (1911). Contains: Les Marionnettes; Berceuse de la poupée; La Sarabande; Chanson du chasseur; Les Ånes; Le Pastour; Chanson de l'escarpolette; Petites litanies de Jésus.
- Trois Pièces (1913). Contains: Évocation; Barcarolle; Scherzo
- Fancies (1915). Contains: Sérénade; Nocturne; Petite valse; Berceuse; Fileuse; Rêverie; Cake Walk.
- Trois Valses romantiques (1917)
- Deux Études de difficulté transcendante (1919)
- Impressions, 2 pieces (1934)

Vocal

- La Chambre blanche, 10 Songs on poems of Henry Bataille (1903)
- La Flûte for voice and piano (1907); words by José-Maria de Heredia
- Sagesse, 5 Poems of Paul Verlaine for high voice and piano (1910)
- Trois Mélodies sur des poèmes de Jean Dominique for voice and piano (1912)
- Guitares et mandolines for voice and piano (1913); words by Camille Saint-Saëns
- Les Mélancolies passionnées, 8 Songs on poems of Charles Guérin (1924)
- Trois Ballades françaises for voice and piano on poems of Paul Fort (1927)
