= Marc Bonnehée =

French opera singer (1828–1886)

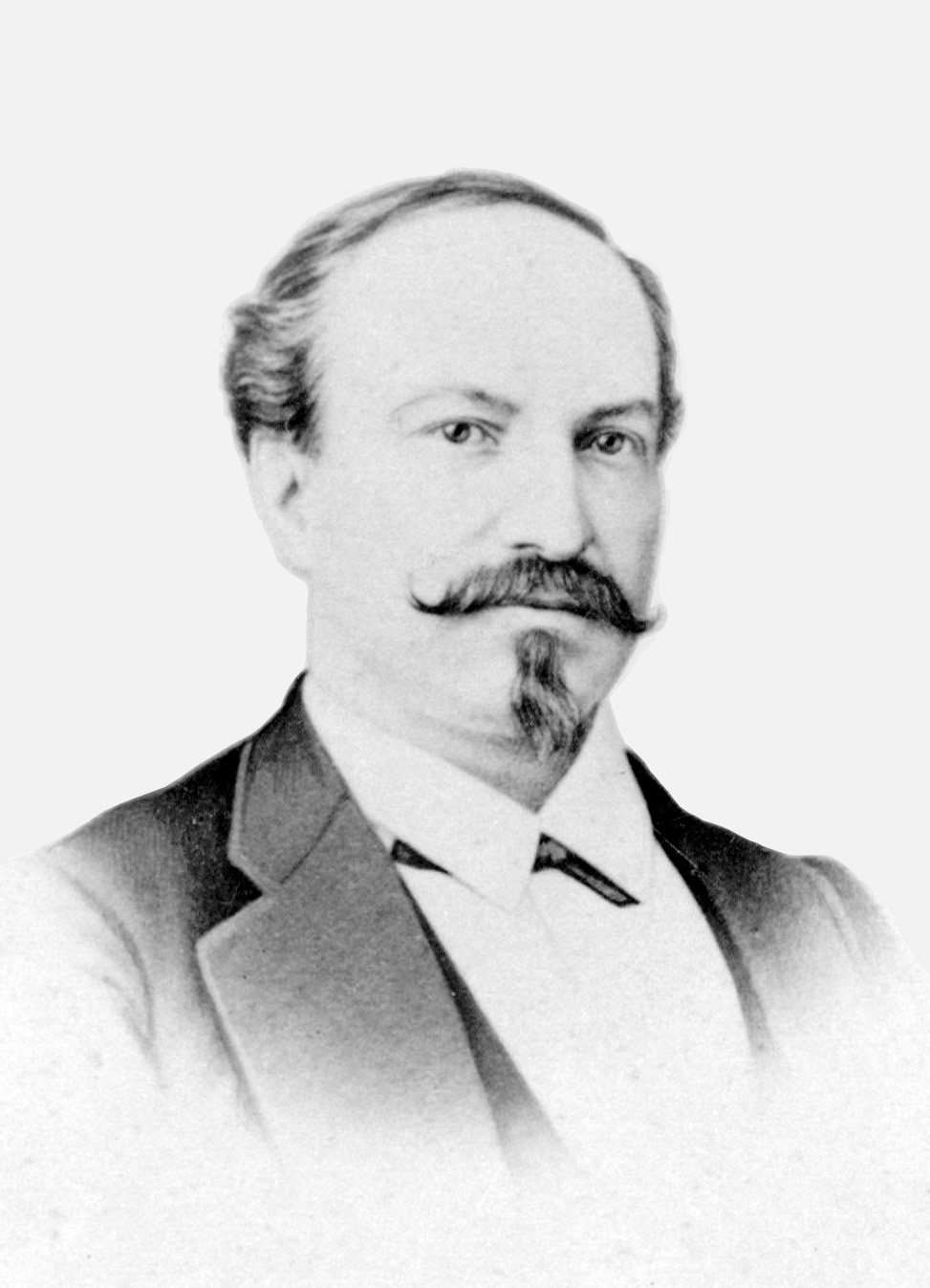
Marc Bonnehée circa 1870.

Marc Bonnehée (2 April 1828 – 28 February 1886) was a French opera singer who sang leading baritone roles at the Paris Opera (1853–1864) and at the Opéra de Toulouse.

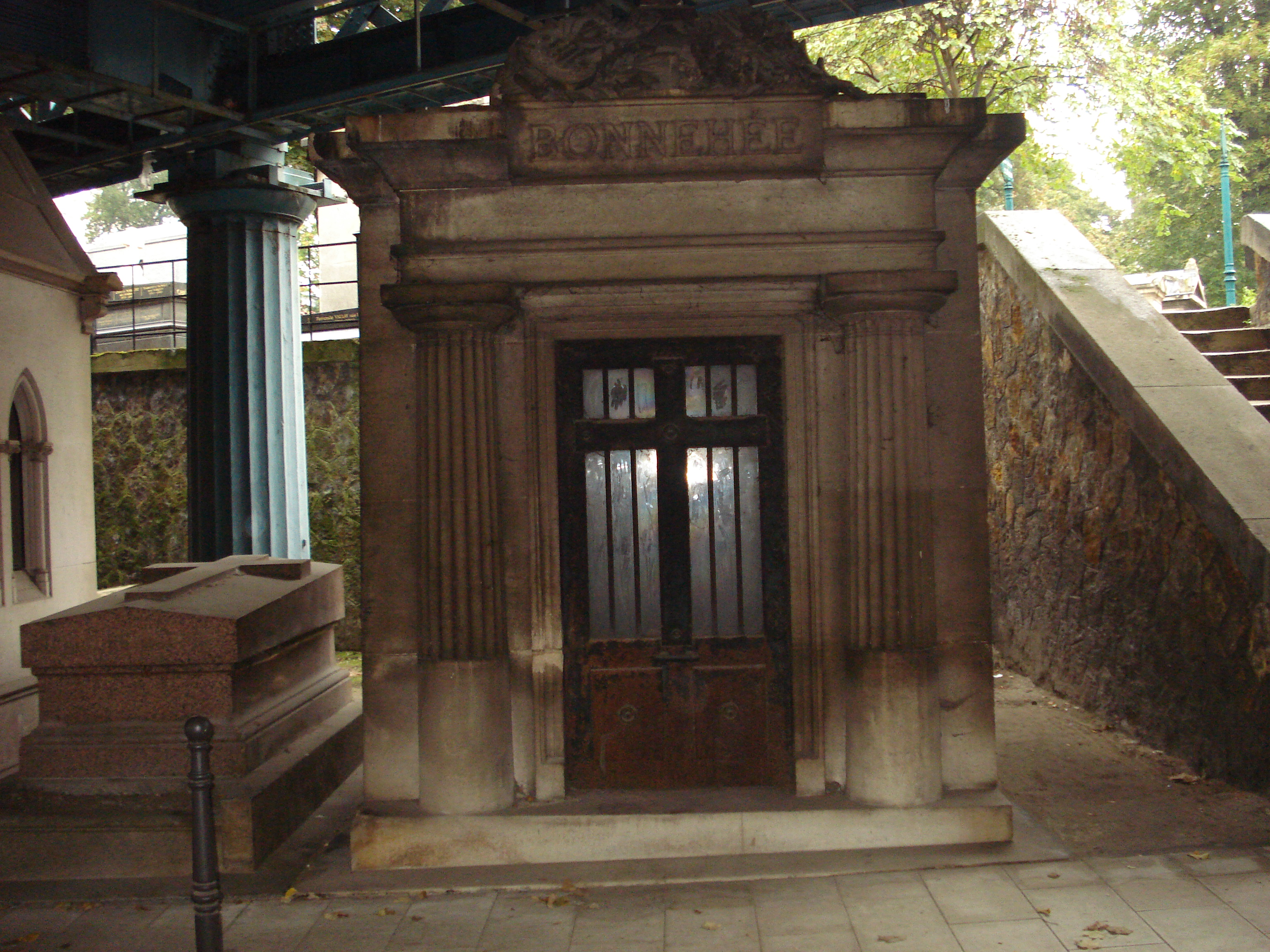
Bonnehée's tomb in Montmartre Cemetery

== Life and career ==
Bonnehée was born in Moumour (Basses-Pyrénées) and studied singing in Toulouse and then at the Paris Conservatory, where his teacher was the tenor Alphonse Révial. In 1853 he won the Conservatory's Second Prize in opéra comique and First Prizes in singing and grand opéra.

He made his debut at the Paris Opera on 16 December 1853 as Alphonse in Donizetti's La Favorite. Amongst the roles Bonnehée created there were Guy de Montfort in Verdi's Les vêpres siciliennes (1855), Duc de Palma in Emanuele Biletta's La rose de Florence (1856), Stello in Halévy's La magicienne (1858), and Julien in Poniatowski's Pierre de Médicis (1860). He also sang the Count in the Paris Opera premiere of Verdi's Le trouvère (12 January 1857). Other prominent roles in his repertoire included the title role of Rossini's Guillaume Tell, Henri Asthon in Donizetti's Lucie de Lammermoor, Cinna in Spontini's La vestale, and Lusignan in Halévy's La reine de Chypre.

In 1865 Bonnehée appeared with great success in Madrid, and in March 1869 he was engaged by the Opéra de Toulouse. After his retirement in 1873, he taught singing in Passy (a suburb of Paris). He became a professor of singing at the Paris Conservatory on 1 October 1879 and an officer of the Académie in 1882. He died in Passy at age 57, and was buried in the Montmartre Cemetery.
