= Jean Gallon =

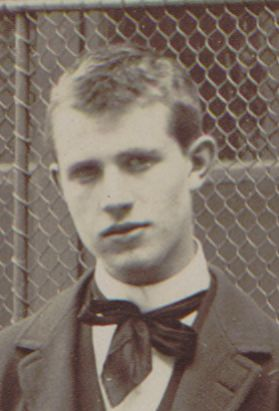
Jean Gallon

Jean Charles Claude Gallon (25 June 1878 – 23 June 1959) was a French composer, conductor and teacher. His compositional output includes six antiphons for strings and organ, one mass, one ballet, and several art songs.

== Biography ==
Born in Paris, Gallon was the elder brother of the composer Noël Gallon. He had a long association with the Paris Conservatoire, first as a student, and later as a faculty member from 1919 to 1949. A professor of harmony, he taught such musicians as Maurice Duruflé, Henri Dutilleux and Olivier Messiaen. He was the chorus master of the Paris Opéra from 1909 to 1914.

Grove's Dictionary of Music and Musicians states that Gallon was the first to include consideration of the developments of Fauré, Debussy and Ravel in the curriculum of the conservatoire. Grove adds that Gallon's compositions are few, but "of high quality and elegant craftsmanship; the sacred pieces are particularly fine".

Gallon died in Paris in 1959, aged 80.
