= Conservatoire de Paris =

Music and dance school in Paris, France

- Conservatoire national supérieur de musique et de danse de Paris (CNSMDP)
- Type: Grande école
- Established: 1795; 231 years ago
- Affiliations: PSL University
- Director: Émilie Delorme
- Location: 209 avenue Jean-Jaurès, Paris, Île-de-France, 75019, France
- Campus: Urban
- Website: conservatoiredeparis.fr/en/accueil/

The Conservatoire de Paris, (Note: French: [kɔ̃sɛʁvatwaʁ də paʁi]) or the Paris Conservatory, is a college of music and dance founded in 1795. Officially known as the Conservatoire National Supérieur de Musique et de Danse de Paris (Note: pronounced [kɔ̃sɛʁvatwaʁ nɑsjɔnal sypeʁjœʁ də myzik e də dɑ̃s də paʁi]) (Paris National Conservatory of Music and Dance), it is located on Jean Jaurès avenue in the 19th arrondissement of Paris, France. The Conservatoire offers instruction in music and dance, drawing on the traditions of the 'French School'. It offered instruction in drama prior to 1946, when its drama division was moved into a separate school, the Conservatoire National Supérieur d'Art Dramatique. Today, both conservatories operate under the auspices of the Ministry of Culture and Communication and are associate members of PSL University. The Conservatoire is also associated with the Conservatoire National Supérieur de Musique et de Danse de Lyon.

== History ==
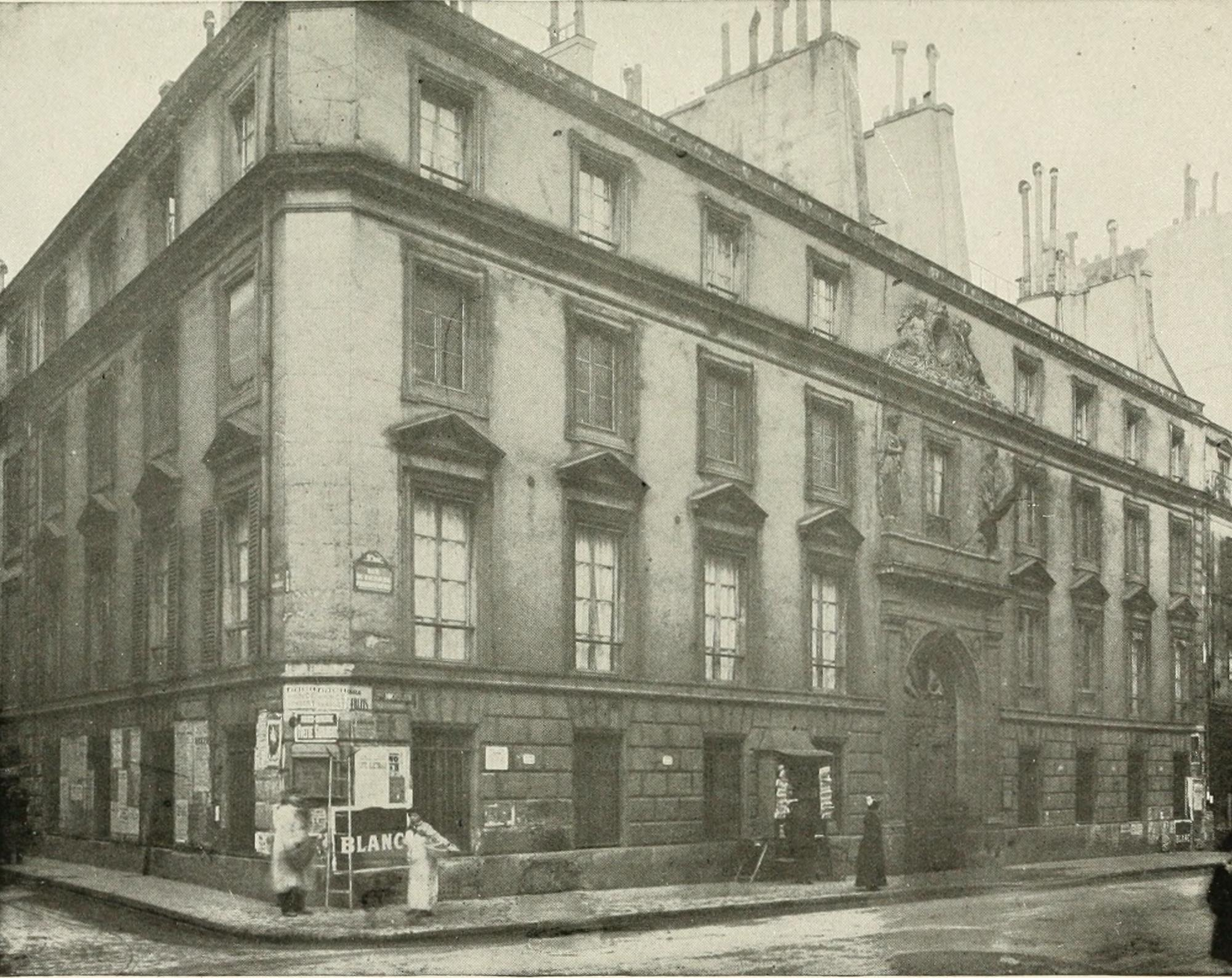
East façade of the Conservatoire building at 15 rue du Faubourg-Poissonnière (state in 1907, demolished after 1911)

=== École Royale de Chant ===
On 3 December 1783, Papillon de la Ferté, intendant of the Menus-Plaisirs du Roi, proposed that Niccolò Piccinni should be appointed director of a future École Royale de Chant (Royal School of Singing). The school was instituted by a decree on 3 January 1784 and opened on 1 April with the composer François-Joseph Gossec as the provisional director. Piccinni refused the directorship but did join the faculty as a professor of singing. The new school was located in buildings adjacent to the Hôtel des Menus-Plaisirs at the junction of the rue Bergère and the rue du Faubourg Poissonnière. In June, a class in dramatic declamation was added, and the name was modified to École Royale de Chant et de Déclamation.

=== Institut National de Musique ===
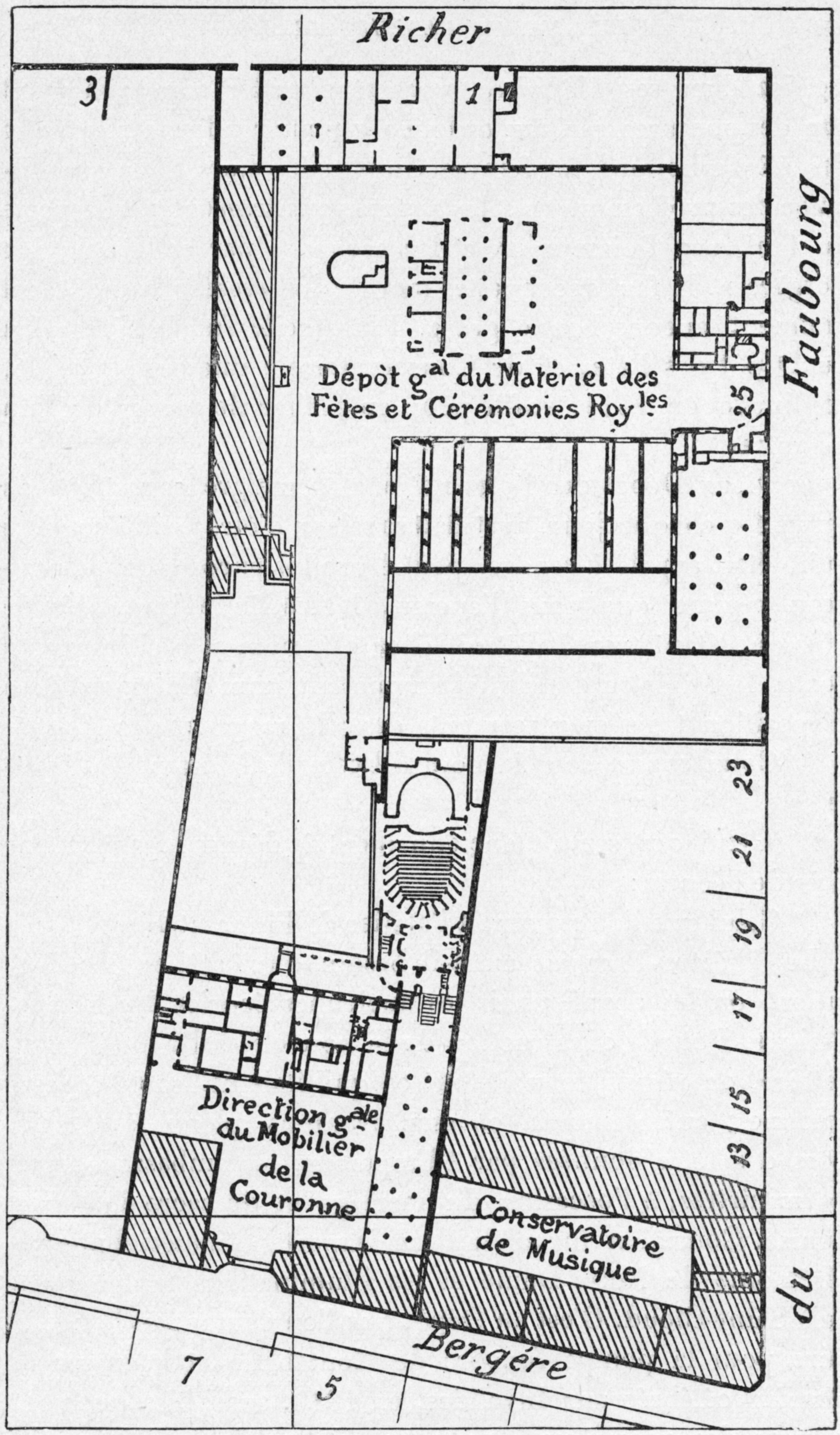
Site plan (1836) of the Menus-Plaisirs, the Concert Hall, and the Conservatoire

In 1792, Bernard Sarrette created the École Gratuite de la Garde Nationale, which in the following year became the Institut National de Musique. The latter was also installed in the facilities of the former Menus-Plaisirs on the rue Bergère and was responsible for the training of musicians for the National Guard bands, which were in great demand for the enormous, popular outdoor gatherings put on by the revolutionary government after the Reign of Terror.

=== Merger ===
On 3 August 1795, the government combined the École Royale with the Institut National de Musique, creating the Conservatoire de Musique under the direction of Sarrette. The combined organization remained in the facilities on the rue Bergère. The first 351 pupils commenced their studies in October 1796.

By 1800, the staff of the Conservatoire included some of the most important names in music in Paris, including the composers Luigi Cherubini, Jean-François Le Sueur, Étienne Méhul, and Pierre-Alexandre Monsigny, as well as the violinists Pierre Baillot, Rodolphe Kreutzer, and Pierre Rode.

=== Bourbon restoration ===
Sarrette was dismissed on 28 December 1814, after the Bourbon Restoration, but was reinstated on 26 May 1815, after Napoleon's return to power during the Hundred Days. After his fall, Sarrette was compelled to retire on 17 November. The school was closed in the first two years of the Bourbon Restoration, during the reign of Louis XVIII, but reopened in April 1816 as the École Royale de Musique, with François-Louis Perne as its director. In 1819, François Benoist was appointed professor of organ.

Probably the best known director in the 19th century was Luigi Cherubini, who took over on 1 April 1822 and remained in charge until 8 February 1842. Cherubini maintained high standards and his staff included teachers such as François-Joseph Fétis, Habeneck, Fromental Halévy, Le Sueur, Ferdinando Paer, and Anton Reicha.

Cherubini was succeeded by Daniel-François-Esprit Auber in 1842. Under Auber, composition teachers included Adolphe Adam, Halévy, and Ambroise Thomas; piano teachers, Louise Farrenc, Henri Herz, and Antoine François Marmontel; violin teachers, Jean-Delphin Alard and Charles Dancla; and cello teachers, Pierre Chevillard and Auguste Franchomme.

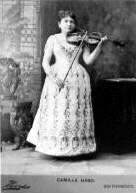
Camille Urso

In 1852, Camille Urso, who studied with Lambert Massart, became the first female student to win a prize on violin.

Site map (after 1853)

In 1853, the rues du Conservatoire and Sainte-Cécile were cut through the parts of the site which were formerly part of the Menus-Plaisirs, isolating the Conservatoire to its own site. A new entrance and façade faced the rue du Conservatoire.

=== Franco-Prussian War and the Third Republic ===
In the Franco-Prussian War, during the siege of Paris (September 1870 – January 1871), the Conservatoire was used as a hospital. On 13 May 1871, the day after Auber's death, the leaders of the Paris Commune appointed Francisco Salvador-Daniel as the director. Daniel was shot to death ten days later by troops of the French Army. He was replaced by Ambroise Thomas, who remained in the post until 1896. Thomas's conservative directorship was vigorously criticized by many of the students, including Claude Debussy.

During this period César Franck was ostensibly the organ teacher, but was actually giving classes in composition. His classes were attended by several students who were later to become important composers, including Ernest Chausson, Guy Ropartz, Guillaume Lekeu, Charles Bordes, and Vincent d'Indy.

Théodore Dubois succeeded Thomas after the latter's death in 1896. Professors included Charles-Marie Widor, Gabriel Fauré, and Charles Lenepveu for composition, Alexandre Guilmant for organ, Paul Taffanel for flute, and Louis Diémer for piano.

Lenepveu had been expected to succeed Dubois as director, but after the "Affaire Ravel" in 1905, Ravel's teacher Gabriel Fauré became director. Le Courrier Musical (15 June 1905) wrote: "Gabriel Fauré is an independent thinker: that is to say, there is much we can expect from him, and it is with joy that we welcome his nomination."

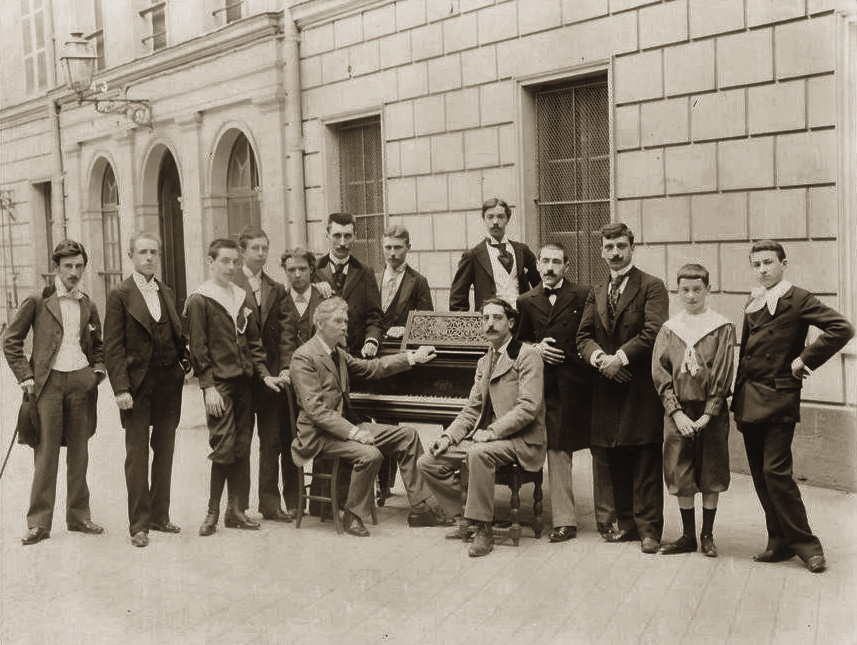
Piano class of Charles de Bériot in 1895 with Maurice Ravel on the left

Fauré in the Director's Office at the Conservatoire, 1918

Fauré appointed forward-thinking representatives (such as Debussy, Paul Dukas, and André Messager) to the governing council, loosened restrictions on repertoire, and added conducting and music history to the courses of study. Widor's composition students during this period included Darius Milhaud, Arthur Honegger, and Germaine Tailleferre. Other students included Lili Boulanger and Nadia Boulanger. New to the staff were Alfred Cortot for piano and Eugène Gigout for organ.

=== Rue de Madrid ===
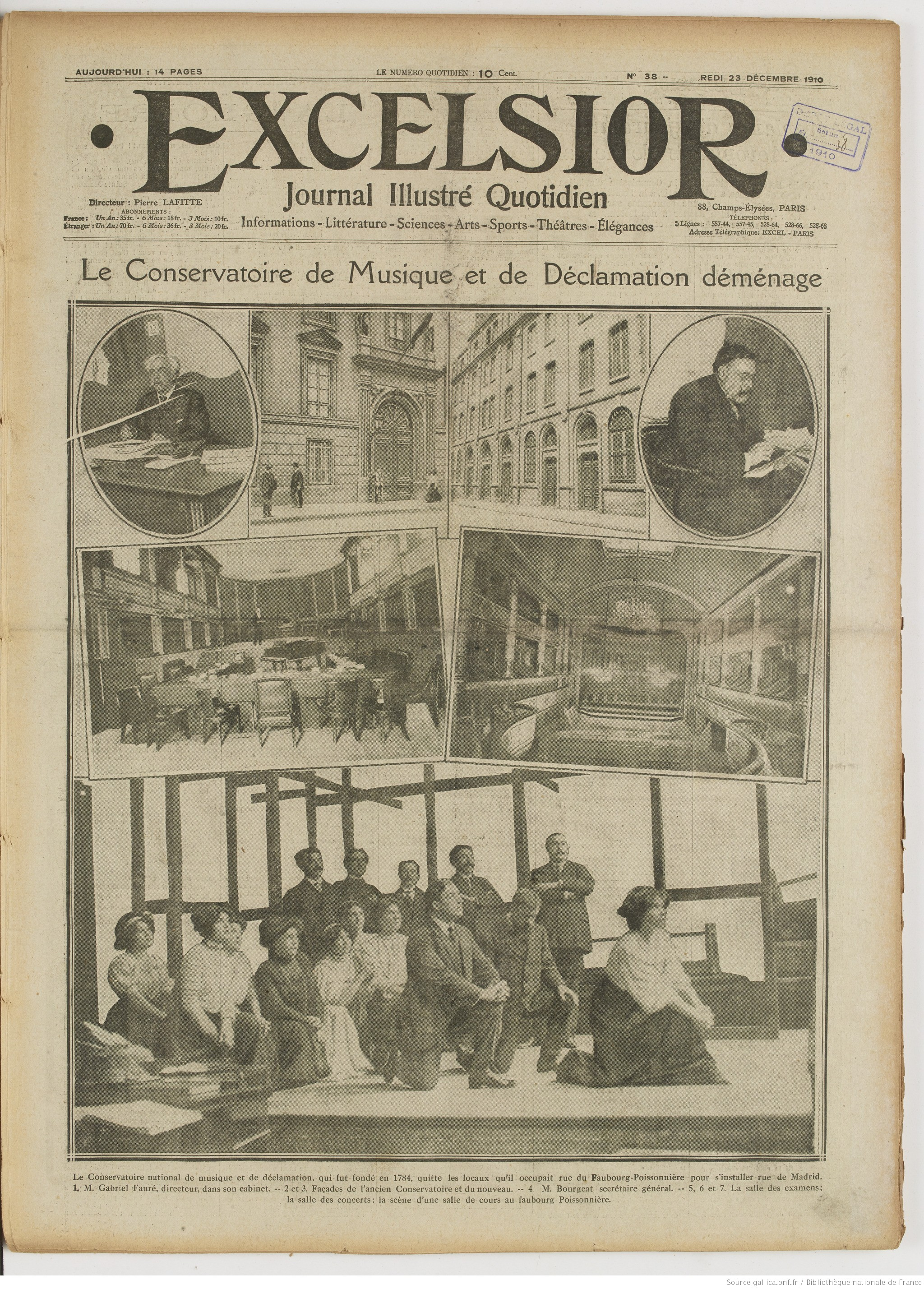
Move from the rue du Faubourg-Poissonnière to the rue de Madrid

In 1911 the Conservatoire moved to 14 rue de Madrid, into facilities that were formerly the collège of the École Saint-Ignace of the Jesuits, whose building had been purchased by the French state in 1905.

Henri Rabaud succeeded Fauré in 1920 and served until April 1941. Notable students were Olivier Messiaen, Jean Langlais, and Jehan Alain. Staff included Dukas and Jean Roger-Ducasse for composition, Marcel Dupré for organ, Marcel Moyse for flute, and Claire Croiza for singing.

Like all institutions in Paris, the Conservatoire was ruled by Nazi Germany and the collaborationist Vichy government during the Occupation of France of 1940–1944. Under the regime's antisemitic policies, Conservatoire administrators alternated between actively collaborating to purge the school of Jewish students (in the case of Rabaud) or working to conceal and protect Jewish students and faculty (in the case of Rabaud's successor, Claude Delvincourt).

Delvincourt was director from 1941 until his death in an automobile accident in 1954. Delvincourt was a progressive administrator, adding classes in harpsichord, saxophone, percussion, and the Ondes Martenot. Staff included Milhaud for composition and Messiaen for analysis and aesthetics.

In 1946, the dramatic arts were transferred to a separate institution, the Conservatoire National Supérieur d'Art Dramatique (CNSAD). Music and dance became the Conservatoire National Supérieur de Musique et de Danse de Paris (CNSMDP).

Delvincourt was succeeded by Dupré in 1954, Raymond Loucheur in 1956, Raymond Gallois-Montbrun in 1962, Marc Bleuse in 1984, and Alain Louvier in 1986. Plans to move CNSMDP to more modern facilities in the Parc de la Villette were initiated under Bleuse and completed under Louvier.

==== Traditions for flute ====
The tradition of the final or exit examination, the concours, has required students, at the end of their course of study, to perform in public a prepared set of musical pieces for a jury consisting of the professors and internationally renowned professionals on the particular instrument, the composer of the solo de concours, and the Director. Behind closed doors, the candidates would be given additional tasks to perform such as sight-reading. In the 20th century, the candidates were judged against a standard, and those who demonstrated outstanding mastery and artistry receive the Premier Prix, the equivalent of a diploma with high honor. Those who earned Deuxieme Prix, also received a diploma but could elect to remain to try again a year later for the top prize. Two lesser levels of distinction existed, the Premier Accessit and Deuxieme Accessit, equivalent to Honorable Mentions but without a diploma. Historically, students who failed to pass the exam on the first attempt would return for another one to two years additional study and try a second time. A student failing to earn either level diploma after two additional attempts would be terminated from the program.

=== Cité de la Musique ===
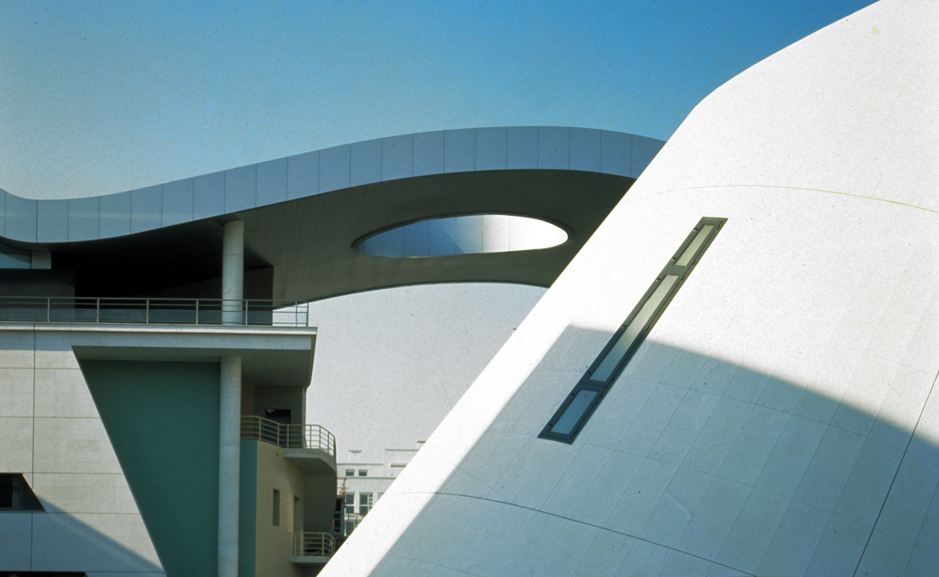
The new Conservatoire building at the Cité de la Musique

The Conservatoire moved to its new facilities in the Cité de la Musique in September 1990.

After over two centuries of male directors, Émilie Delorme, for a decade director of the European Academy of Music (French: Académie européenne de musique) at the Aix-en-Provence Festival, was appointed as the Conservatoire's first female director on 14 December 2019. Currently, the conservatories train more than 1,200 students in structured programs, with 350 professors in nine departments.

== Facilities ==
=== Former concert hall on the rue Bergère ===
A concert hall, designed by the architect François-Jacques Delannoy, was inaugurated on 7 July 1811. It is in the shape of a U (with the orchestra at the straight end). It holds an audience of 1055. The French composer and conductor Antoine Elwart described it as the Stradivarius of concert halls.

In 1828 François Habeneck, a professor of violin and head of the Conservatoire's orchestra, founded the Société des Concerts du Conservatoire (forerunner of the Orchestre de Paris). The society held concerts in the hall almost continuously until 1945, when it moved to the Théâtre des Champs-Élysées. The French composer Hector Berlioz premiered his Symphonie Fantastique in the Conservatoire's hall on 5 December 1830 with an orchestra of more than a hundred players.

The concert hall is now part of CNSAD.

Theatre of the old Conservatory of Music

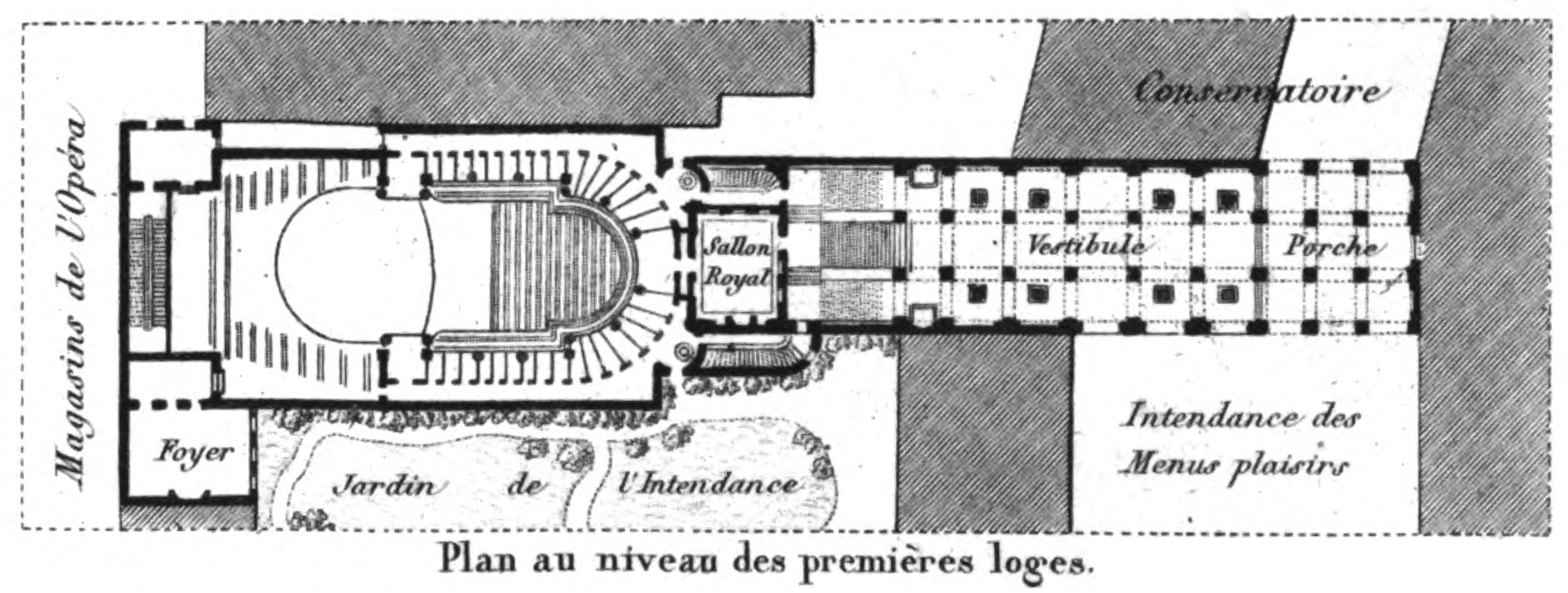
Plan at the level of the first loges in 1821 (north at the left)

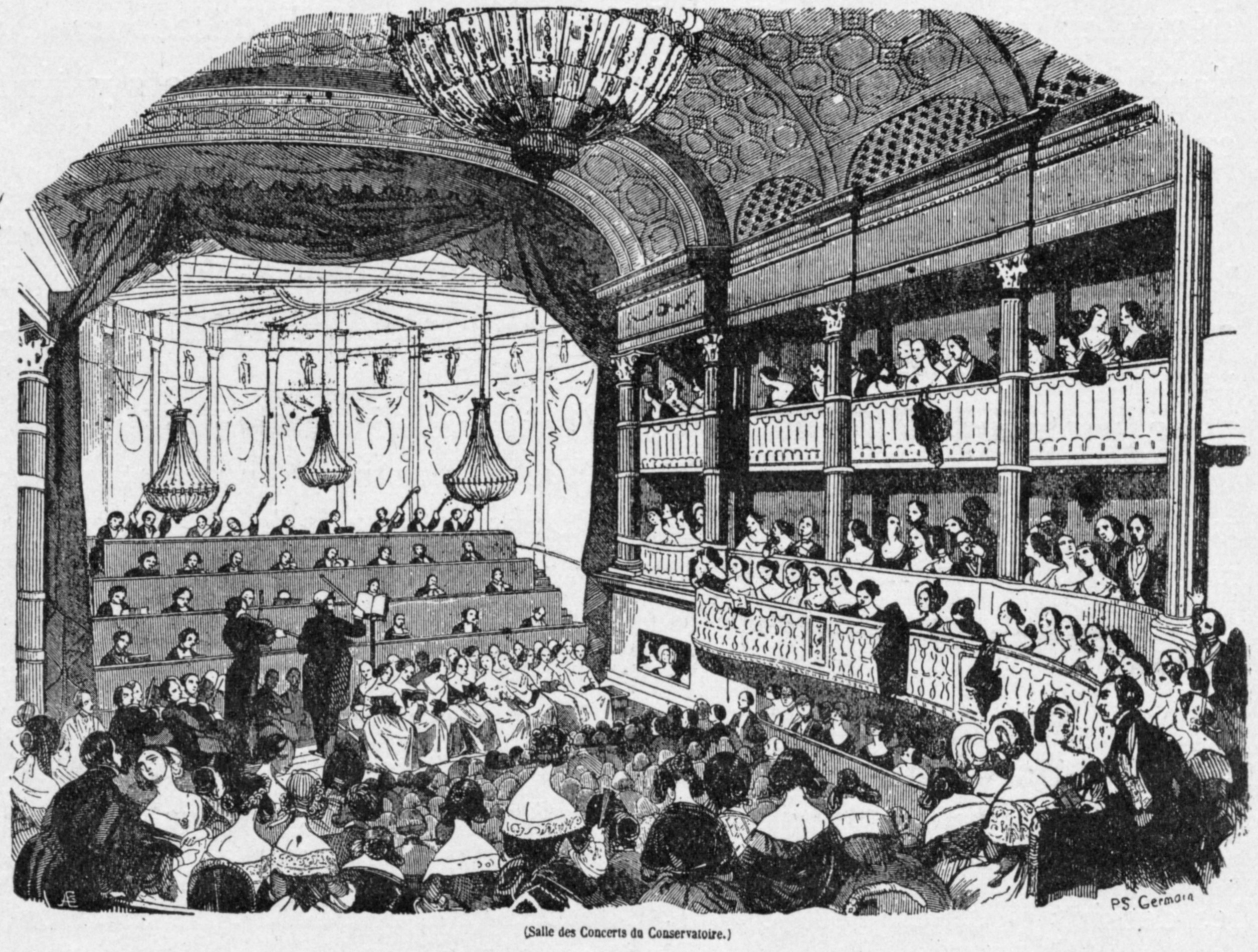
A concert in March 1843

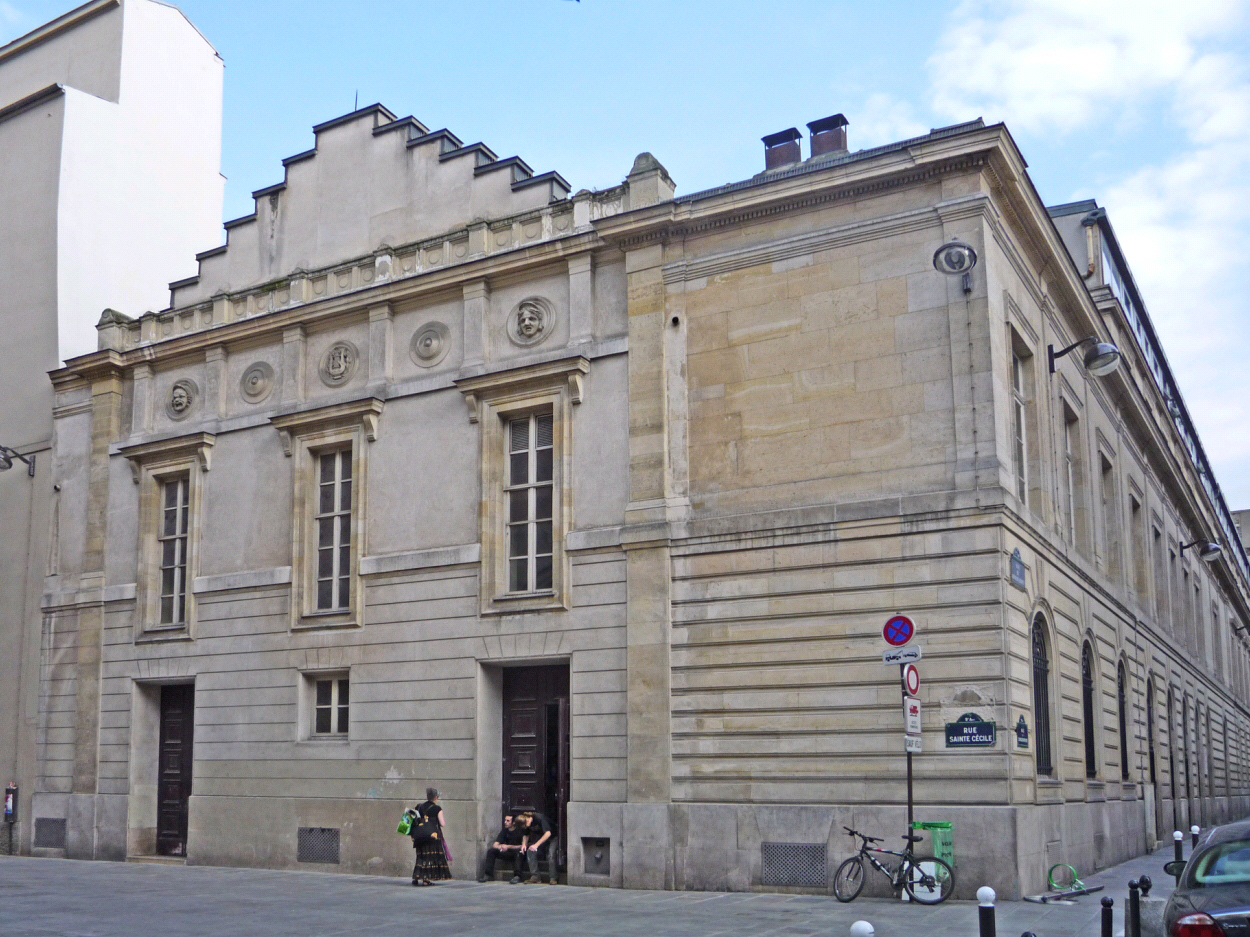
North façade of the theatre in 2009 48.873074°N 2.347001°E
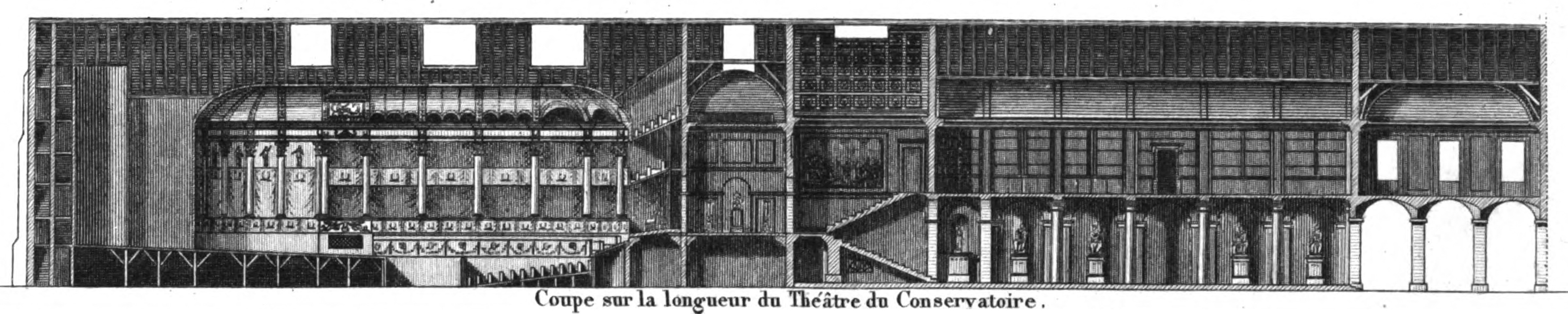
Long section with the theatre on the left and entrance vestibule on the right with the library above (1821)

=== Library ===
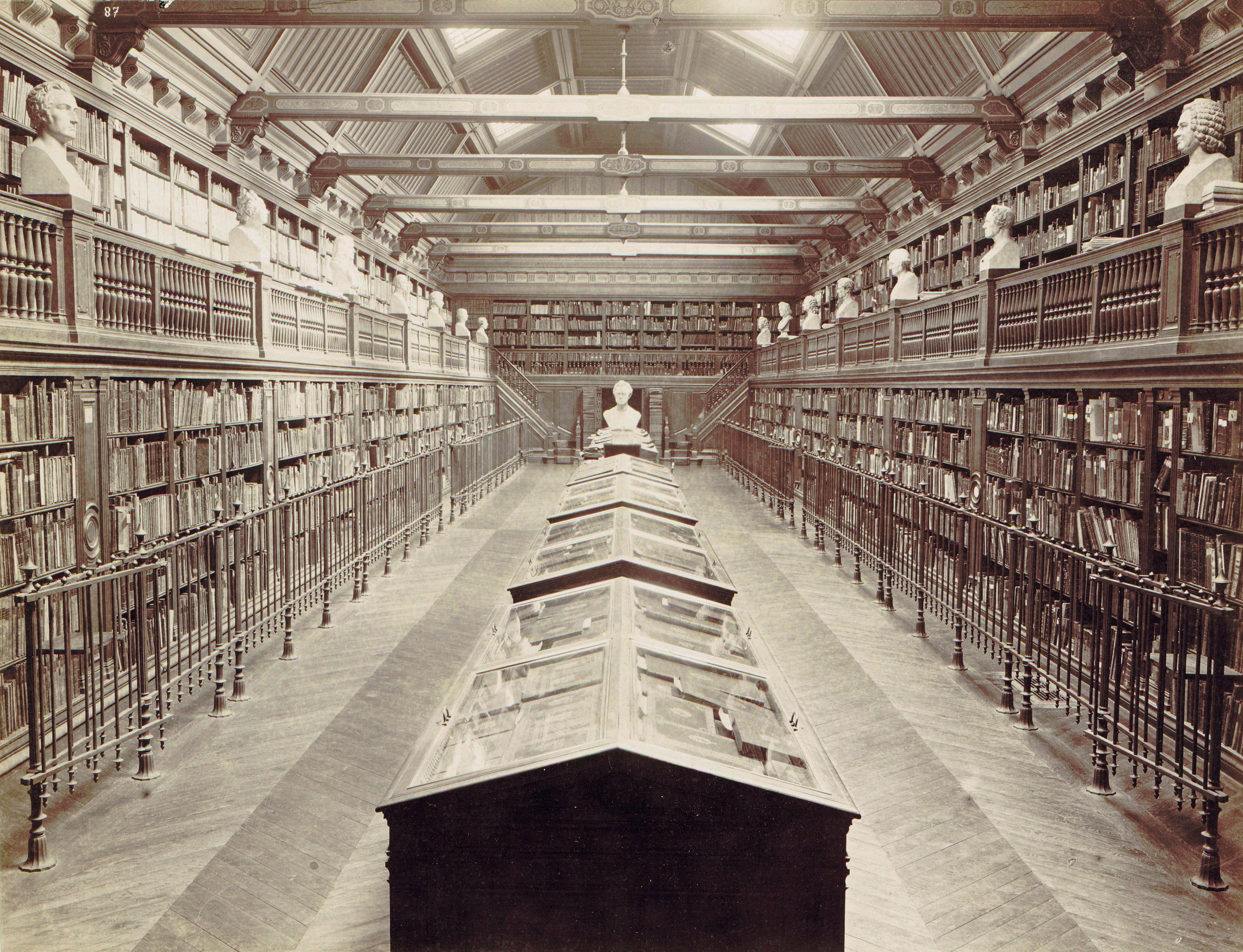
Library, 1895

The original library was created by Sarrette in 1801. After the construction of the concert hall, the library moved to a large room above the entrance vestibule. In the 1830s, Berlioz became a part-time curator in the library and was the librarian from 1852 until his death in 1869, when he was succeeded by Félicien David.

=== Instrument museum ===
The Conservatory Instrument Museum, founded in 1861, was formed from the instrument collection of Louis Clapisson. The French music historian Gustave Chouquet became the curator of the museum in 1871 and did much to expand and upgrade the collection. The collection is now located in the Musée de la Musique.

== Successor institutions ==
=== CNSAD ===
The dramatics arts were separated from music and dance in 1946 and are now in the Conservatoire National Supérieur d'Art Dramatique (CNSAD) (National Superior Conservatory of the Dramatic Arts), a school for acting, drama. It is located in the original historic building of the Conservatoire de Paris on the rue du Conservatoire at rue Sainte-Cécile in the 9th arrondissement of Paris. Free public performances by students at the CNSAD are given frequently in the Conservatory of Music's former theatre.

=== CNSMDP ===
The music and dance divisions of the Conservatoire de Paris are now officially known as the Conservatoire National Supérieur de Musique et de Danse de Paris (CNSMDP) (National Superior Conservatory of Paris for Music and Dance). The French government built its new campus in the 19th arrondissement of Paris as part of the Cité de la Musique, designed by Christian de Portzamparc. The new facilities were inaugurated in 1990.

The organ on site was built in 1991 by the Austrian Rieger Orgelbau firm. It has 53 stops on 3 manuals and pedals. A larger organ of over 7,000 pipes with 91 stops was made in 2015 by the same company for the symphony hall of the nearby Philharmonie de Paris.

== Notable people ==
See also Category:Conservatoire de Paris alumni

A list of former students can be found at List of former students of the Conservatoire de Paris and former teachers at List of former teachers at the Conservatoire de Paris.

== See also ==
- École Normale de Musique de Paris
- Prix de Rome

== Bibliography ==
- Ayers, Andrew (2004). The Architecture of Paris. Stuttgart; London: Edition Axel Menges. ISBN 978-3-930698-96-7.
- Brault, Élie; Du Bois, Alexandre, editor (1893). Les Architectes par leurs œuvres, volume 3 (at HathiTrust). Paris: H. Laurens. Notice bibliographique, BnF.
- Charlton, David; Trevitt, John; Gosselin, Guy (2001). "Paris. VI. 1789–1870" in The New Grove Dictionary of Music and Musicians, 2nd edition, edited by Stanley Sadie. London: Macmillan. ISBN 9781561592395 (hardcover). OCLC 419285866 (eBook).
- Chouquet, Gustave (1900). "Conservatoire de Musique" in A Dictionary of Music and Musicians, edited by George Grove. London: Macmillan. Copy at Wikisource.
- Fétis, François-Joseph (1878). Biographie universelle des musiciens, supplement in two volumes by Arthur Pougin. Paris: Didot. Vols. 1 and 2 at Google Books.
- Holoman, D. Kern (2004). The Société des Concerts du Conservatoire, 1828–1967. Berkeley: University of California Press. ISBN 9780520236646.
- Pierre, Constant, editor (1895). B. Sarrette et les origines du Conservatoire national de musique et de déclamation. Paris: Delalain Frères. Copy at Google Books.
- Pierre, Constant, editor (1900). Le Conservatoire national de musique et de déclamation. Documents historiques et administratifs. Paris: Imprimerie Nationale. 1031 pages. View at Google Books.
- Prod'homme, Jacques-Gabriel; Crauzat, E. de (1929). Les Menus Plaisirs du Roi. L'école royale et le Conservatoire de musique. Paris: Delagrave. OCLC 842136603.
- Simeone, Nigel (2000). Paris – A Musical Gazetteer. New Haven: Yale University Press. ISBN 9780300080537.
