= Louis Fleury =

French flautist (1878 - 1926)

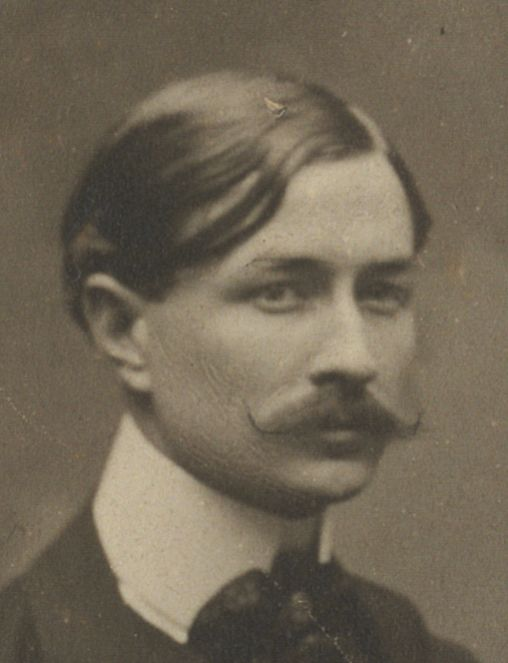
- Fleury in 1903

Background information
- Born: 24 May 1878; France
- Died: 10 June 1926 (aged 48)
- Genres: Baroque, classical
- Occupation: Soloist
- Instrument: Flute

Louis Fleury (24 May 1878 – 10 June 1926) was a French flautist, a student and colleague of Paul Taffanel, a writer who advocated for the revival of Baroque music, and a musician who promoted contemporary composers by commissioning and performing their work.

Less well-known today than some of his fellow flute players, such as Philippe Gaubert and Marcel Moyse, perhaps because he died at a relatively young age, did not establish a teaching studio and left no known recordings, Fleury may be best remembered for his association with one of the most important works in the repertoire for solo flute, Syrinx by Claude Debussy. The piece, originally titled La Flûte de Pan, was dedicated to Fleury, who performed its premiere in 1913.

== Early life and education ==
Louis François Fleury was born on 24 May 1878 in Lyon to Alphonse François Fleury and Antoinette Donadille Fleury. The family often visited Paris, taking Louis to the theater and the opera.

Writing about his early exposure to music, Fleury recalled, "My first lesson in music was given me by a schoolmaster in the little country village where I passed my youth. The poor fellow knew nothing of music [...] but he thought it best not to refuse the chance of making a little extra money, so he taught me to sing the Marseillaise, the only tune he knew." When he was twelve, Fleury was given a piccolo; displaying an aptitude for the instrument, he was later given a Boehm flute. His instructor on the piccolo was a barber, and on the flute, a pharmacist who was also an amateur flutist.

In 1893 the family moved to Paris to allow Louis to continue his musical training. Fleury made his professional debut in September 1894, playing a duet for two flutes with Georges Barrère. He was accepted into the studio of Paul Taffanel, the professor of flute at the Paris Conservatory, in 1895, after his second audition. He studied with Taffanel for five years, receiving a premier prix diploma in 1900, performing that year's morceau de concours, Sixième solo de concours, op. 85, by Jules Demersseman. (Note: The Conservatory's annual three-part examination for flute students culminated in the concours, a public performance of an instrumental solo, often a specially commissioned work. The awards were premier accessit and deuxieme accessit (first- and second-class certificate of merit), and deuxieme prix and premier prix, which were comparable, respectively, to a degree and a degree with honors. Students could make three attempts to attain a degree. If they failed, they were required to leave the conservatory, but winning the first prize presaged a successful professional career. (Fleury received a premier accessit in 1897 and a deuxieme prix in 1899.))

Taffanel kept notes on the progress of his students. In 1897 he wrote "Very impressionable by nature. Good feeling for music." In 1900 he observed that Fleury had made "Very marked progress. Refined and musical by nature. Has virtually conquered his nervousness. Excellent student."

== Performance career ==
While still studying at the conservatory, Fleury played in the orchestras of the Folies-Bergere and the Folies Dramatique. Later he played with the Association des Grands Concerts, led by Reynaldo Hahn, Concerts Berlioz, conducted by Pierre Monteaux, and the Concerts Cortot. But his interest shifted from orchestra participation to solo and small ensemble performances.

In 1902 Fleury joined Barrère's chamber ensemble, Société moderne d'instruments à vent (SMIV), as second flute. By 1903 Fleury was touring as a soloist throughout Europe. He was particularly popular in England, where he appeared in over forty concerts between 1905 and 1925, the first on 16 October 1905 with Dame Nellie Melba. He made his first visit to the United States with soprano Emma Calvé on her 45-city tour in 1905–06. He provided obbligato accompaniment for Calvé's solos (as he had for Melba) and performed works by Handel and Mozart with other members of the touring company.

In 1905 Fleury assumed leadership of the SMIV when Barrère left to take a position with the New York Symphony Orchestra. The following year he founded the Société de Concerts d'autrefois, an ensemble dedicated to performing music of the 17th and 18th centuries on period instruments. (Although Fleury continued to play his Boehm instrument rather than a baroque flute.)

Syrinx
Claude Debussy's Syrinx, which was dedicated to Fleury. Performed by Sarah Bassingthwaite

Fleury's most well-known performance occurred on 1 December 1913. Claude Debussy had composed a piece for unaccompanied flute as incidental music for the third act of Gabriel Mourey's play, Psyché. At the premiere of the play, held in the music salon of arts patron Louis Mors, (Note: In 1895, Mors, who had made his fortune as an automobile manufacturer, built a mansion on land formerly part of the estate of Alexandre Le Riche de La Poupelinière, who hosted a famous salon there in the 18th century. In 1931 the building was demolished with the exception of the music salon, which became the Théâtre Le Ranelagh.) Fleury played, from offstage, La Flûte de Pan. Reviews of the music were positive. Critic Georges Casella wrote in Comœdia:

Au troisième acte, l'air adorable de la flûte de Pan, que signa Claude Debussy fut écouté avec ravissement.
(In the third act, the charming melody of the flute of Pan, by Claude Debussy, was listened to with delight.)

Another critic wrote:

Au troisième acte, pour évoquer la puissance rustique du dieu Pan, nous avons entendu un joli morceau de flûte qui est dû à Debussy. Il fut interprété avec maîtrise par M. Louis Fleury.
(In the third act, to evoke the rustic power of the god Pan, we heard a pretty piece for flute by Debussy. It was performed with mastery by M. Louis Fleury.)

Fleury kept the manuscript to himself; no one else performed the piece during his lifetime. Re-titled Syrinx, it was published in 1927, after Fleury's death, and became recognized as the seminal flute solo of the twentieth century.

Fleury's concert career was interrupted by World War I. After entering the army, (Note: The 13th Territorial Infantry Regiment (13th RIT), a reserve unit based in Compiègne, consisted of men aged thirty-four to forty-five, considered – at least at the start of the war – too old for combat service.) he became part of Fernand Halphen's first military orchestra (August 1914 – December 1915), which performed for the troops and for the local populace. Halphen, who had also studied at the Paris Conservatory, added selections of classical music to the standard repertoire of marches, dances and patriotic songs, which gave Fleury opportunities for solos. The orchestra disbanded when the soldier-musicians were reassigned to other units. (Note: A lieutenant in the 13th RIT, Fernand Halphen is one of the rare composers to have founded and directed a military orchestra, which officially represented the Groupe d'armées du Nord, notably welcoming royalty visiting the front — Albert I of Belgium on 22 August 1915 and George V of England on October 26 the same year. Halphen formed a second orchestra in April 1916, but without his star performers, fellow Conservatory alumni Fleury and Marcel Tournier, it was less successful and disbanded on 1 May 1917 when Halphen, suffering from diphtheria, was repatriated to a hospital in Paris where he died on May 16.)

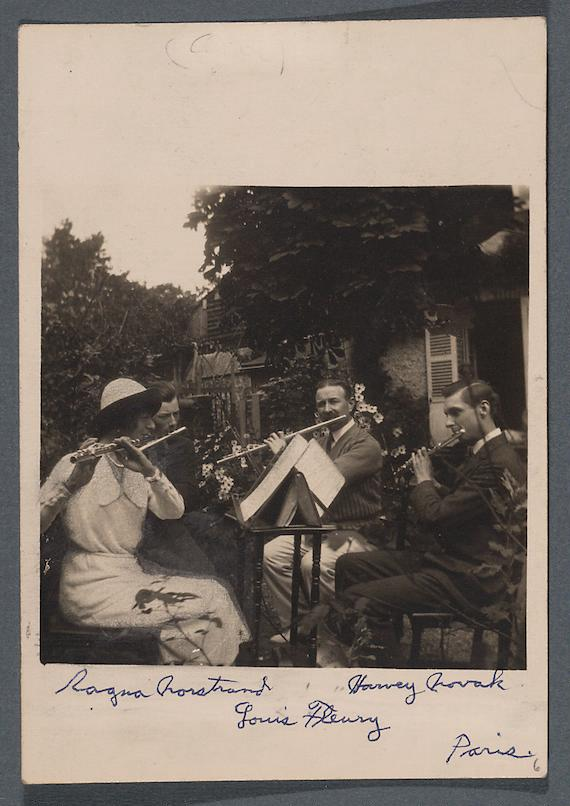
Ragna Norstrand, Augustus Rouart, Louis Fleury, and Harvey Novak, in garden, Paris

After the war, Fleury returned to touring and writing, promoting Baroque music along with contemporary French music. By 1924, the SMIV had premiered "no less than one hundred and twenty-five works [...] and revived all the classical or modern works of any importance." Danielle Gaudry, writing about the history of early chamber wind ensembles, notes: "At this point, it seemed that virtually every major French composer in succeeding generations would be interested in contributing something to the growing repertoire of chamber wind music."

== Writing and editing ==
Fleury credited Taffanel with rekindling interest in early music, which was then seldom programmed in France. Fleury contributed to this revival by editing new editions of Baroque works for flute by Michel Blavet, Händel, Loeillet, Vinci, Naudot and others. He did not always strive for historic accuracy. Graham Sadler, in his preface to the 1992 Boosey & Hawkes edition of the Blavet sonatas, states:

The editor took a number of liberties with Blavet's notation; he omitted the composer's breathing marks and continuo fingering, altered some of the articulation (and even certain notes and rhythms) and added dynamics. He also changed Blavet's principal ornament sign from '+' to the modern 'tr', though without essentially changing the meaning. In some respects this edition, with its “more pianistic” accompaniment, may be better suited to the “modern” flutist than a facsimile or Urtext edition.

Fleury contributed articles to a number of journals, primarily on the flute and French music. Edward Blakeman writes:

[T]wo particularly stand out: "The Flute and Flutists in the French Art of the 17th and 18th Centuries," which elegantly explores the Baroque antecedents of Taffanel's style, and "The Flute and Its Powers of Expression," which is a closely argued statement of the new French flute aesthetic.

Taffanel had spent many years gathering material for a comprehensive survey of the flute, its history, performers and repertoire, but he died before he could finish writing it. His widow, Geneviève Taffanel, and editor, Albert Lavignac, entrusted Fleury, who had been collaborating with Taffanel, to complete the article, which was published in the Encyclopédie de la musique et dictionnaire du Conservatoire.

=== Select bibliography ===
Encyclopedia entries

- Taffanel, Paul; Fleury, Louis (1927). "La Flute". In Albert Lavignac; Lionel de Laurencie (eds.). Encyclopédie de la musique et dictionnaire du Conservatoire: Deuxième partie. Vol. 3. Paris: Librairie Delagrave. pp. 1483–1526.
- Cobbett, Walter Willson, ed. (1929). "The Flute in Modern Chamber Music". Cobbett's Cyclopedic Survey of Chamber Music. Vol. 1 A-H. London: Oxford University Press. pp. 402–406.

Journal articles

- "The Flute and British Composers (part 1)". The Chesterian. 1 (3): 79–82. December 1919. hdl:2027/uiug.30112014377748.
- "The Flute and British Composers (part 2)". The Chesterian. 1 (4): 115–117. January 1920. hdl:2027/uiug.30112014377748.
- "The Flute and Its Powers of Expression". Music & Letters. 3 (4). Translated by A. H. Fox Strangways: 383–393. October 1922. doi:10.1093/ml/III.4.383. JSTOR 726079.
- "The Flute and Flutists in the French Art of the 17th and 18th Centuries". The Musical Quarterly. 9 (4). Translated by Frederick H. Martens: 515–537. October 1923. doi:10.1093/mq/IX.4.515. JSTOR 738531.
- "Chamber Music for Wind Instruments". The Chesterian (36): 111–116. January 1924a.
- "The Flute in Paris". The Flutist. 5 (8). Translated by Arthur Brooke: 176–177. August 1924b.
- "About 'Pierrot Lunaire': The Impressions Made on Various Audiences by a Novel Work". Music & Letters. 5 (4). Translated by A. H. Fox Strangways: 347–356. October 1924. doi:10.1093/ml/V.4.347. JSTOR 726925.
- "Souvenirs d'un flûtiste". Le Monde Musical. 35 (23 & 24): 405–406. December 1924.
- "Music for Two Flutes without Bass". Music & Letters. 6 (2). Translated by P. Wyatt Edgell: 110–118. April 1925. doi:10.1093/ml/VI.2.110. JSTOR 726088.

Music (as editor or transcriber)

- Bach, Johann Sebastian (1925), Fleury, Louis (ed.), Sonatas for Flute and Piano, Paris: Durand
- Blavet, Michel (1908–1913), Fleury, Louis (ed.), Six Sonatas for flute and continuo, op. 2, London: Rudall, Carte, & Co. Written in 1732, Fleury's editions were published between 1908 and 1913.
- Couperin, François (1922), Fleury, Louis (ed.), Douze Transcriptions for flute and piano
- Dukas, Paul (1926), Alla Gitana Pour Flûte Et Piano, Transcribed by Louis Fleury, Paris: A. Leduc
- Fleury, Louis, ed. (1928), Oeuvres originales des XVIIe et XVIIIe siècles pour la flûte, Paris: Alphonse Leduc, "Adapted to the modern instrument and entirely revised by L. Fleury". Piano realizations by Mme. Fleury-Monchablon.
  - Leonardo Vinci: Sonata [in D major]
  - Anon: Greensleeves (environ 1600)
  - Anon: John! Come and Kiss me now?
  - General Reid: Sonata [in C major]
  - Loeillet: Sonate en ut [in C major]
  - Naudot: Fifth Sonata [in A major]
- Ravel, Maurice (1909), Pavane pour une infante défunte, Paris: E. Demets, "Transcribed for flute or violin and piano by Louis Fleury."

== Personal life ==
On 24 December 1907 Fleury married Jeanne Marie Gabrielle Monchablon, the daughter of painter Alphonse Monchablon. Gabrielle was already a well-known pianist and harpsichordist. She and her husband often performed together; she was usually billed as Mme. Fleury-Monchablon. They had one daughter, Antoinette, whose godmother was Gabrielle's good friend, the composer Mel Bonis. (Note: Bonis dedicated a piece for piano, Étude en sol bémol majeur, op. 136, to Antoinette.)

Fleury died suddenly in Paris on 10 June 1926, of blood poisoning. A memorial concert was held on 6 November 1926 at Kent House, the London home of Mr. and Mrs. Saxton Noble, to benefit the education of Fleury's sixteen-year-old daughter, who was studying piano in Paris.

== Works dedicated to Louis Fleury ==
- 1901 Félix Fourdrain, Ballade for flute and piano, op. 11
- 1904 Mel Bonis, Sonata for flute and piano, op. 64
- 1913 Cyril Scott, Scotch Pastoral for flute and piano
- 1913 Reynaldo Hahn, Deux Pièces pour flûte et piano. The first piece is dedicated to Fleury, the second to Gaston Blanquart.
- 1913 Claude Debussy, La Flûte de Pan for solo flute. Published in 1927 as Syrinx.
- 1913 Ralph Vaughan Williams, Suite de Ballet for flute and piano. According to Michael Kennedy, although it was "first performed at a London soirée in March 1920 by the great French flautist Louis Fleury, I believe it was composed in 1913, the year in which Vaughan Williams met Fleury at Stratford-upon-Avon and in Paris."
- 1914 Fernand Halpern, Noël for flute and harmonium. Written in Brény and probably played at a local church on Christmas.
- 1920 Pierre de Breville, Une flûte dans les vergers for flute and piano Fleury performed the premiere on 15 January 1921.
- 1921 Cyril Bradley Rootham, Suite in Three Movements for flute and piano, op. 64
- 1921 George Henschel, Theme and Variations, op. 73
- 1921 Philippe Gaubert, Suite for flute and piano. The second movement, "Berceuse orientale", is dedicated to Fleury.
- 1921 Jacques Pillois, Bucoliques, sonatine for flute and piano.
- 1922 Darius Milhaud, Sonatina for flute and piano, op. 76. Dedicated to Fleury and pianist Jean Wiéner, who performed its debut at the Jean Wiéner Concerts in Paris in 1923.
- 1922 Charles Koechlin, Sonata for 2 Flutes, op. 75. Written 1918–1920, premiered in 1922 by Fleury and Albert Manouvrier, with the Société Moderne des Instruments à Vent.
- 1922 Cyril Scott, The Extatic Shepherd for solo flute
- 1923 Jacques Ibert, Jeux: Sonatine pour flûte et piano
- 1924 Rhené-Baton, Passacaille for flute and piano, op. 35
- 1924 Albert Roussel, Joueurs de flûte, four pieces for flute and piano, op. 27. The third piece, "Krishna", is dedicated to Fleury.
- 1924 Ladislas Rohozinski, Quatre Pièces for flute and violin. The first piece is dedicated to Fleury.
- 1925 Alexandre Tansman, Sonatine for Flute or Violin and Piano

== Sources ==
- Blakeman, Edward (2005). Taffanel: Genius of the Flute. Oxford University Press. ISBN 978-0-19-517099-3.
- Blavet, Michel (1992), Louis Fleury (ed.), Six Sonatas for Flute and Piano Op. 2, Nos. 1-3, Preface by Graham Sadler, Boosey & Hawkes.
- Carroll, Lydia R. (2019). Music for a new era: Selected works dedicated to flutist Louis Fleury (1878-1926) (DMA thesis). James Madison University.
- Duplaix, Bernard (July–September 1994). "Louis Fleury". Traversières. 12 (46): 46–52.
- Géliot, Christine (2000). Mel Bonis : femme et compositeur, 1858-1937. L'Harmattan. ISBN 9782738490124.
- Schnapper, Laure (2017). "Chef de musique dans la Grande Guerre". In Laure Scnapper (ed.). Du salon au front: Fernand Halphen (1872–1917) (in French). Paris: Hermann. pp. 265–308. ISBN 978-2-7056-9411-1.
