= Joseph Rampal =

French flutist (1898–1983)

- Born: 12 September 1895; Provence, France
- Died: 12 January 1983 (aged 87)
- Genres: Classical
- Instrument: Flute

Joseph Rampal (12 September 1898 – 12 January 1983) was a French flutist and flute teacher, and the father of the internationally renowned soloist Jean-Pierre Rampal.

== Graduate of the French Flute School ==
Born in Provence, France, the son of a Marseille jeweller, Joseph showed musical talent as a youngster and in 1913 was sent to Paris, with silver flute in hand, to further his studies. His elder brother Jean-Baptiste was already in the capital, studying painting with Auguste Renoir at the École des Beaux Arts. Joseph was to become another star graduate of the legendary French Flute School. Along with Marcel Moyse, René Le Roy, Georges Laurent, Gaston Blanquart, Georges Delangle, he studied at the Paris Conservatoire under the celebrated flutist Adolphe Hennebains (1862–1914), who was himself a pupil of Paul Taffanel.

At the outbreak of the First World War in 1914, Joseph and his brother joined the army. Within just a few weeks, Jean-Baptiste was killed on the Marne. Joseph himself was wounded twice in 1916 but survived and in 1918 returned to Paris to continue his flute studies at the Conservatoire. In 1919, playing Busser's ‘Thème Varie’, Joseph was awarded the Conservatoire's First Prize. A young Marcel Moyse was on the jury.

== Marseille’s pre-eminent flute-teacher ==
Having lost an elder brother at the outset of the war, Joseph decided in 1919 that it was important for him to return to be with his family in Marseille rather than pursue a career in Paris. It was an understandable choice, but one which probably imposed limitations on the range of his success as a musician on the national stage. Jean-Pierre reports that Moyse considered Joseph “one of the best musicians of his era and that, had he stayed in Paris, he would have made a distinguished career.”

Back in Marseille from 1919, Joseph joined the Marseille Radio Orchestra and began teaching flute at the Marseille Conservatoire. Eventually he rose to become flute professor at that institution, and also became Principal Flute with the Marseille Symphony Orchestra (Orchestre des Concerts Classiques de Marseille). Each summer, from 1928, he also played first flute in the Orchestre de Theatre du Grand Casino at the Vichy summer music festival.

As a teacher, he presided over the emergence of his only son, Jean-Pierre, as a musical talent who would eventually go on to achieve true international celebrity as a flute soloist. At first, however, he was reluctant to encourage Jean-Pierre to pursue a career in music, despite the youngster's evident enthusiasm and early ability. Joseph's wife Andrée considered that her husband's “patchwork quilt of positions and appointments” with orchestras and on radio and in theatres held too much uncertainty as a career path for their only child. Instead, they recommended a career in medicine for him. Nevertheless, Joseph privately encouraged his son's learning of the flute at their apartment home at 20 rue Brochier, Marseille.

By 1934, Joseph's flute class at the Conservatoire was experiencing a crisis in membership, with numbers having diminished from fifteen to three. So, to help find new pupils, he bought and repaired several old “battered flutes” so that he had instruments available with which to entice new pupils without burdensome cost to their parents. In addition, he agreed to include his own son Jean-Pierre – then just twelve and a half years old – in his flute class. His son had by then acquired his first silver flute as a gift from his grandfather. Using the Altès method, as taught by Joseph, Jean-Pierre progressed to a level at which he won the Marseille Conservatoire's Second Prize in 1935 and First Prize in 1936. For a while in the late 1930s, he joined his father at the Marseille Symphony Orchestra's flute desk, playing second flute. Privately father and son continued to play flute duets together “almost every day”.

Although Joseph never pursued a career as a soloist, his son considered him to have possessed the “soloist’s temperament”. According to Jean-Pean-Pierre, he had a stage presence. “He held himself very erect,” reported Jean-Pierre, “and, unlike me, he hardly moved when he played.” Of Joseph's sound, the son admired his father's “special sonority… very much his own, very ‘fleshy’ and full of emotion”. The intense and moving quality of his tone was also admired by Marcel Moyse. It was with justification that Jean-Pierre later referred to his father as “my link with the French tradition.”

== Mentor to a rising star ==
After the war, Joseph remained a mentor to his son who was by then emerging as a soloist of note on the national stage. Once, in 1946, Joseph was asked to play a flute solo with the Marseille Orchestra but, wishing to encourage his son's burgeoning career, he persuaded the conductor to allow Jean-Pierre to play in his place. It was also with Joseph's help in 1948 that the young Jean-Pierre found the money to buy from an antiques dealer the only solid gold flute in existence made by the famous 19th century French craftsman Louis Lot. It had become available by chance and, having acquired it, his son Jean-Pierre sent the flute to his father who then worked for hours to re-assemble the instrument and restore it to working order. "He worked all the day and night," reported Rampal junior; "he called me in the morning and said it was a fantastic flute. He couldn't sleep before; he made the pads and everything." Jean-Pierre went on to perform and record with it for eleven years until the late 1950s.

Following Jean-Pierre Rampal's early success as a soloist, Joseph made several recordings with his son. Among the earliest is a 1951 recording of Beethoven’s Allegro and Menuet for two flutes. Later, father and son appeared together on recordings of Reicha's Quartet in D Major for four flutes (Opus 12), along with Maxence Larrieu and with Alain Marion, another of Joseph's students in Marseille. A recording with Jean-Pierre of Vivaldi's concerto in C major for two flutes (P.76) was made towards the end of Joseph's playing career.

According to Jean-Pierre Rampal, his father remained a constructive critic right to the end, remarking that if only Jean-Pierre had practiced more he could have made an even better career for himself. Joseph Rampal died in Paris in January 1983, aged 87. Notice of his death appeared in the New York Times, 14 January 1983, an occurrence that reflects the enormous popularity in America by then achieved by the son, whose early career Joseph Rampal did so much to shape. He is buried in Montparnasse cemetery in Paris alongside his wife Andrée (d.1991) and their son Jean-Pierre Rampal (d.2000).

== Books ==
Bel Canto Flute: The Rampal School (2003; Winzer Press) by Sheryl Cohen is a study of Jean-Pierre Rampal's teaching and playing method by an American flautist and teacher who studied with both Rampal and his fellow Marseille flautist Alain Marion. In essence, however, Cohen tries to define a flute tradition that springs from the teaching of Joseph Rampal in Marseille, linked through him to the earlier grand tradition of Taffanel, Hennebains and Gaubert. Although it is controversial to refer to the Marseilles group of flute players as a 'school' distinct from the more widely acknowledged 'French Flute School' in which Marcel Moyse and his predecessors are central figures, Cohen's study is an attempt to give Joseph Rampal, together with his son Jean-Pierre and others, some formal credit for an identifiable style of playing that became appreciated right around the musical world. As signature characteristics of this style, Cohen points in particular to a "poetic approach to expressive phrasing as a foundation to develop musical artistry, creative practice methods, breath control tone, articulation, and technique, all while searching to free the artist from within." Sheryl Cohen, professor emerita of Music at the University of Alabama, USA, has since extended her study by also running a Fellowship at the Camargo Foundation in Cassis in Provence entitled The Flute School of Marseille: The Rampal Lineage. The course chronicles “the development and influence of the school of Joseph Rampal on flute playing in the twentieth century” in order to “preserve the vast philosophical and pedagogical project mounted by the school, and establish Joseph Rampal’s proper place in the history of the flute.”
