= The Complete Works of the Great Flutist =

The Complete Works of the Great Flutist is a collection of reissued and remastered recordings of performances by French flutist Marcel Moyse. The notes in the Muramastu Japanese site that markets the five CD box set only has English titles for the tracks, and has a number of mistakes regarding the playing order.

The first CD is exemplar and has Moyse playing his own studies and studies from the Andersen Op 15. The set also contains important repertoire items and are often first recordings of works demonstrating contemporary interpretations (CDs 3 and 5).

== No. 1: The French Flute School at Home ==
- MGCD - 1001 - Moyse on solo flute.
1. 24 Small Melodious Studies : No. 1 - (C Major/Dominant 7th)
2. 24 Small Melodious Studies : No. 2
3. 24 Small Melodious Studies : No. 3
4. 24 Small Melodious Studies : No. 4
5. 24 Small Melodious Studies : No. 8
6. 24 Small Melodious Studies : No. 10
7. 24 Small Melodious Studies : No. 7
8. 25 Melodious Studies : No. 10
9. 24 Small Melodious Studies : No. 9
10. 25 Melodious Studies : No. 25 - Theme, 1st and 3rd Variation (E Minor/E Major)
11. 25 Melodious Studies : No. 3
12. 24 Small Melodious Studies : No. 15
13. 24 Small Melodious Studies : No. 22
14. 24 Daily Studies H. Soussman Op.53 : No. 15
15. Bouquet Des Tons. A.B. Furstenau Op.125 - No.9
16. 24 Etudes - J. Andersen Op.15 : No.8
17. 24 Etudes - J. Andersen Op.15 : No.16
18. 24 Etudes - J. Andersen Op.15 : No.18
19. 24 Etudes - J. Andersen Op.15 : No.15
20. 24 Etudes - J. Andersen Op.15 : No.4
21. 24 Etudes - J. Andersen Op.15 : No.3
22. 24 Daily Studies H. Soussman Op.53 : No. 22
- 24 Small Melodious Studies and variations (Themes based on bel canto, i.e., homogenous sound and extending over the interval of a fifth, with subsequent variations exploring mainly articulation)
- 25 Melodious Studies and variations (Medium and progressive technical exercises on rhythm, keys and core sound. Extended variations exploring articulation and often including lower register.)
- Note 1. - Track No.12 - 24 Small Melodious Studies : No 15 - This is played in Bb Major not in the published B - Moyse warms up on the Bb Major Scale

== No. 2: Tone Development Through Interpretation ==
- MGCD - 1002 - Moyse on solo flute with Louis Moyse on Piano and Blanche Moyse on Violin in the trio sonatas.
- The TD reference refers to the number in the Moyse Publication of the same name and indicates if Piano part is included
1. A. Messager – from the Opera 'Fortunio' - Act II - "La maison gris" TD-No.13 + Piano part
2. J. Massenet – from the Opera 'Sapho' - "Qu’il est loin, mon pays" TD-No.76
3. A. Bruneau – from the Opera 'Adieu foret profonde' - "L’attaque du Moulin" - TD-No.78 + Piano part
4. C.M. von Weber – from the Opera 'Oberon' - Act II Finale - "Andantino" - TD-No.47
5. J. Massenet – from the Opera 'Werther'- Act IV - "La notte di natale/La nuit de Noel" - TD-No.61 + Piano part
6. J. Massenet – from the Opera 'Sapho' - TD-No.74
7. G. Verdi – from the Opera 'Il Trovatore' - Act IV - "Andante con moto" - TD-No.59 + Piano part
8. M.A. Reichert – Op. 1 Fantaisie Brilliante - Introduction and theme - Theme only "Andantino moderato" TD-No.38
9. C.M. von Weber – from the Opera 'Oberon' - Act III Finale - "Andante" - TD-No.55
10. Jean-Louis Tulou – Air Ecossais - Fantaisie Brillante Op.29 - TD-No.71
11. Bizet – L’arlesienne - Adagio - TD-No.49 + Piano part
12. Beethoven – Sonata-Adagio - TD-No.83
13. J.S. Bach – Trio Sonata - Adagio
14. G.F. Handel – Trio Sonata - Adagio - TD-No.81
- Note 1 : The publication (Tone Development Through Interpretation) has four other piano parts for Nos. 37 (Delibes), 77 (Massenet), 79 (Donizetti) and 90 (J.S. Bach) but no recordings exist.

== No. 3: Repertoire ==
- MGCD - 1003 - Moyse on flute. Piano accompaniment from Louis Moyes, J. Benvenuti and R. Delor
1. Debussy – Syrinx (solo flute)
2. R. Taki – Kojo No Tsuki - (The Old Castle by Moonlight - Variations for Flute and Piano, Louis Moyse published by McGinnis and Marx 1987)
3. P. Taffanel – Andante Pastorale
4. P. Wetzger – Am Waldesbach, Op. 33
5. P.I. Tchaikovsky – Andante Cantabile
6. P.A. Genin – Carnival de Venise, Op. 14
7. F. Couperin – Rossignol en Amour
8. A.F. Doppler – Fantaisie Pastorale Hongroise, Op. 26
9. A. Dvorak – Humoresque (in G Major)
10. A. Roussel – Joueurs de Flûte, Op. 27 – I- Pan
11. A. Roussel – Joueurs de Flûte, Op. 27 - IV - Mr De La Pejaudie
12. A. Roussel – Joueurs de Flûte, Op. 27- II -Tityre
- Note 1 - Kojo No Tsuki in this recording is not the version in the zen-on publication of Variations on Three Japanese Songs by L. Moyse
- Note 2 - This is an arrangement from original piano piece Humoresque No. 7 ( of 8) : Poco lento e grazioso in G flat major. On another recording, The Art of Marcel Moyse, it is played G flat major.
- Note 3 - Moyse did not record Krishna (item III) from this Roussel suite.

== No. 4: Repertoire ==
- MGCD - 1004
1. Beethoven – Serenade D major Op 25 (Fl/Vn/Va) : I - Entrata : Allegro
2. Beethoven – Serenade D major Op 25 (Fl/Vn/Va) : II - Tempo ordinario d'un Menuetto
3. Beethoven – Serenade D major Op 25 (Fl/Vn/Va) : III - Andate con Variazioni
4. Beethoven – Serenade D major Op 25 (Fl/Vn/Va) : IV - Adagio : Allegro vivace e disinvolto
5. F.C. Neubauer – Adagio (Fl/Va)
6. Beethoven – Trio in G major WoO. 37 (Fl/Bn/Pn) : I - Allegro
7. Beethoven – Trio in G major WoO. 37 (Fl/Bn/Pn) : II - Adagio
8. Beethoven – Trio in G major WoO. 37 (Fl/Bn/Pn) : III - Thema Andante con Variazioni
9. J.C. Schultz – Sonata in e minor (2Fl) : Adagio
10. J.C. Schultz – Sonata in e minor (2Fl) : Presto
11. G.F Handel – Sonata in G major Op 1/5 : Minuetto
12. G.F Handel – Sonata in G major Op 1/5 : Allegro
13. M. Blavet – Sonata in d minor Op 2/2 : Andante
14. M. Blavet – Sonata in d minor Op 2/2 : Allegro
15. M. Blavet – Sonata in d minor Op 2/2 : Moderato
16. M. Blavet – Sonata in d minor Op 2/2 : Largo
17. M. Blavet – Sonata in d minor Op 2/2 : Allegro
18. G.P. Telemann – Trio Sonata in E major (Fl/Vn/Pf) : Soave
19. G.P. Telemann – Trio Sonata in E major (Fl/Vn/Pf) : Presto
20. G.P. Telemann – Trio Sonata in E major (Fl/Vn/Pf) : Andante
21. G.P. Telemann – Trio Sonata in E major (Fl/Vn/Pf) : Scherzando
22. J.C. Naudot – Sonata in b minor Op 6/1 (2Fl) : Adagio
23. J.C. Naudot – Sonata in b minor Op 6/1 (2Fl) : Allegro
24. A. Woodall – Serenade (Fl/Pn)

== No. 5: Repertoire ==
- MGCD-1005
1. P.O. Ferroud – Trois Pieces (Flute Solo) - No. 1 : Bergere captive
2. P.O. Ferroud – Trois Pieces (Flute Solo) - No. 2 : Jade
3. P.O. Ferroud – Trois Pieces (Flute Solo) - No. 3 : Toan-Yan
4. M. Genarro – Aubade printaniere (2Fl/Vn)
5. L.Moyse – Scherzo from Suite in C major (2Fl/Va)
6. J. Ibert – Concerto : Allegro (first movement only)(Flute and Orchestra)
7. J. Ibert – Piece (Flute Solo) - not complete - see Note 1 below
8. J. Ibert – Entr’acte (Fl/Gtr)
9. S. Bate – Sonata (Fl/Pf) : I - Allegro
10. S. Bate – Sonata (Fl/Pf) : II - Andante
11. S. Bate – Sonata (Fl/Pf) : III - Presto
12. P.A. Genin – Air Napolitain Op. 8 : Presto
13. G. Bizet – Menuet from L’Arlsienne Suite No. 2
14. G. Bizet/F.Borne – Chanson de Boheme et Finale – Carmen Fantaisie
15. P. Gaubert – Madrigal
16. G.A. Hue - Fantaisie
- Note 1. Ibert Piece - This recorded version omits the rising chromatic minor thirds section at 2min 24secs and goes back to the rising figure at a Tempo (bar 15) for 7 bars, then uses material from Tempo 1.
- The recording finishes on the material in the last four bars finishing on the high Db in the penultimate bar. [ Based on 1936 published version]
