= Léopold Lafleurance =

French flutist and professor

- Born: Léopold Jean-Baptiste Lafleurance; 17 April 1865; Bordeaux
- Died: 4 August 1953 (aged 88); Saulx-les-Chartreux
- Occupation(s): Flutist; Professor

Léopold Lafleurance (17 April 1865 – 4 August 1953) was a French flutist and professor.

Lafleurance enrolled in the Conservatoire de Paris at the age of twelve and received privately lessons from Paul Taffanel. From the following year he was in the ranks as a flautist, next to his uncle, from the Orchestra of the Society of Concerts and later in other orchestras. From 1888 onwards, he played as a substitute, and from 1891, as a member of the Paris Opera Orchestra (as a piccolo flûtist until 1947, aged 81, when he retired). From 1914 to 1919, he was professor of flute at the Conservatoire de Paris. Among his students were Joseph Rampal and René Le Roy.

== Bibliography ==
- (in German) András Adorján, Lenz Meierott (éd.), Lexique de la Flûte [« Lexikon der Flöte »]. Laaber-Verlag, Laaber 2009, ISBN 978-3-89007-545-7.
