= Louis Moyse =

French flute player and composer (1912-2007)

Background information
- Born: 14 July 1912; Scheveningen, Netherlands
- Died: 30 July 2007 (aged 95) Montpelier, Vermont, U.S.
- Genres: Classical
- Occupations: Composer, teacher
- Instrument: Flute

Louis Moyse (pron. moh-EEZ; 14 July 1912 – 30 July 2007) was a French flute player and composer. He was the son of influential French flutist Marcel Moyse, a co-founder of the Vermont Marlboro Music Festival, and taught many world-class flutists all over the world. He died of heart failure at age 95.

Louis Moyse was born in Scheveningen, Netherlands, during one of his father's tours. His first flute teachers were his father and Philippe Gaubert. Louis Moyse was a member of the successful Moyse Trio where his father played flute, Louis played piano and his former wife, Blanche Honegger Moyse, violin.

Louis Moyse also taught for 27 years at Marlboro College, and was professor at Boston University and the University of Toronto. He continued giving private lessons in Westport, New York, while touring with his wife Janet White Moyse, of 33 years, around the world and the United States. They later moved to Montpelier, Vermont, for the last nine years of his life. He also gave semiannual master classes and concerts in his hometown, St.-Amour, France, until 2004.

He is considered by some to be one of the most prolific producers of flute music worldwide, which has been published by G. Schirmer, Southern Music, Theodore Presser, McGinnis & Marx, E. Henry David Music Publishers, Leduc (France) and Zen-On (Japan). Works for Flute and Piano by Louis Moyse (CRI 888), performed by flutist Karen Kevra and pianist Paul Orgel, received a Grammy Award nomination in 2003.

== Publications ==
Among his own compositions are:

- Suite for 2 flutes and alto (1957)
- Four dances for flute and viola (1958)
- Wind quintet (1961)
- Marlborian Concerto No 1, for flute, English horn, and orchestra (1969)
- First Sonata, for flute and piano (1974)
- Introduction, Theme and Variation, flute and piano (1980)
- Second Sonata, Op. 60, flute and piano (1998)
- Trois Hommages, flute and piano
- Two Miniatures, flute and piano
- Impromptu in B-Flat Major, Op.142, flute and piano
- Suite in a minor, flute and piano

Collections of flute music:

- Louis Moyse Flute Collection, Schirmer
- 40 Little Pieces for Beginning Flutists
- Flute Music By French Composers, flute and piano
- Album Of Flute Duets, 2 flutes
- Twelve Fantasias for Solo Flute
- Solos for the Flute Player, flute and piano
- Album of Sonatinas for Young Flutists, flute and piano
- First Solos for the Flute Player, flute and piano
- Little Pieces for Flute and Guitar, flute and guitar

He has also edited flute music by others, such as Mozart's Flute Quartet K. 285.

== See also ==
- Marcel Moyse
