= Alain Marion =

French flutist (1938–1998)

Alain Marion (25 December 1938 – 16 August 1998) was a French flutist, and considered one of the world's best flute players of the late twentieth century.

== Biography ==
Marion was born in Marseille on Christmas Day 1938. He studied at the Marseille Conservatoire under flutist Joseph Rampal, and gained the award premier prix de flûte when he was only 14. He later studied with Jean-Pierre Rampal (son of Joseph) at the Conservatoire de Paris (where he eventually became a professor), won a prize at the Geneva International Music Competition.

In 1964, the French national broadcaster Radiodiffusion-Télévision Française appointed Marion as first flutist, and later to the Orchestre de Paris. In 1972 he became a soloist for the Orchestre National de France. He joined the chamber orchestra Ensemble InterContemporain in 1977, working with Pierre Boulez.

He taught every summer at the Académie internationale d'été de Nice, becoming director in 1986. During his tenure as director, musicians including Jean-Pierre Rampal, Jessye Norman and Henryk Szeryng taught at the organisation.

Marion played a gold flute, made by the Sankyo Flute Company of Japan, and performed repertoire from multiple musical styles. He expressed particular admiration for Baroque flutist-composers, as well as for the Czech composer Bohuslav Martinů.

Marion died of a heart attack while on tour in Seoul, South Korea, aged 59.
