= Jeanne Moirod =

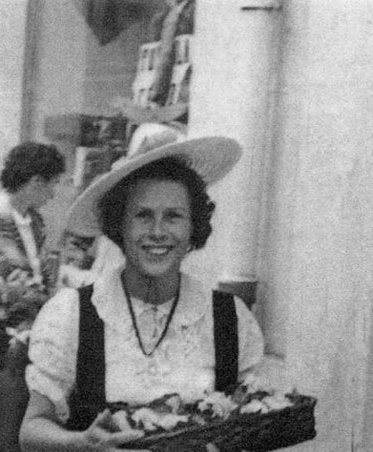

Mayor
- In office March 1953 – May 1953
- Constituency: Saint-Amour

Personal details
- Born: 1905 Near Saint-Amour
- Died: 1997 (aged 91–92)
- Occupation: Politician
- Awards: Resistance Medal, Médaille militaire

Jeanne Moirod (1905, near Saint-Amour—1997) was a French Resistance member, principal liaison agent of Colonel Henri Romans-Petit's northern group, and mayor of Oyonnax from March to May 1953.

== Biography ==
She was a glassmaker, assistant to the Mayor of Oyonnax and a Trotskyist. Her house was the improvised hub of the Resistance in Jura; from this hub, newspapers were reproduced, Moirod found shelters and caches for the combatants and weapons in the mountains and she helped transport the guerrillas there. With her brother-in-law, Gabriel Jeanjacquot, Moirod helped to disseminate the journal, Bir-Hakeim, by journalist André Jacquelin.

In March 1953, she was elected mayor of Oyonnax, but remained in that position for just two months as elections were held on 26 April and 3 May 1953.

== Awards ==
- There is a Jeanne-Moirod square in Oyonnax.
- Jeanne Moirod is one of the six women who received the Resistance Medal.
- She is one of the few women who hold the Médaille militaire.
