= Jane Rutter =

Australian flautist

- Born: 2 November 1958 (age 68); Australia
- Genres: Classical, jazz, pop
- Occupation: Musician
- Instrument: Flute
- Website: www.janerutter.com

Jane Rutter (born 2 November 1958) is an Australian flautist. Her repertoire encompasses classical, jazz, and pop music.

== Career ==
Rutter specializes in the French Flute School.

She has lectured at the Sydney Conservatorium of Music and formed the chamber group POSH. Rutter has performed worldwide. She has released over twenty solo albums.

== Personal life ==
Rutter lives in Sydney with her family. Outside music, she supports green causes. In 2005 she took her stepmother to court over her father's estate.

== Discography ==
List of albums, with selected details and chart positions
Title	Album details	Peak chart positions
Title	Album details	AUS
Posh (as Posh)	Released: 1981; Format: Cass, LP	—
Chamberfunk (as The Posh)	Released: 1988; Label: Jarra Hill Records (JHR 2007); Format: Cass, LP	—
Nocturnes & Préludes For Flute	Released: 1989; Label: WEA (256981.1); Format: CD, Cass, LP	58
Mozart's Flute	Released: 1990; Label: ABC Classics (4766477); Format: CD, Cass, LP	—
Apasionada	Released: 1992; Label: BMG (7432115202); Format: CD	—
Blo	Released: 1996; Label: Philips (454 558–2); Format: CD	—
Romancing the Flute	Released: 1998; Label: Philips (465 061–2); Format: CD	92
Verse 1	Released: 1999; Label: Jane Rutter; Format: CD	—
The Very Best of	Released: 2003; Label: Wizard (WIZCDL20002); Format: CD	90
Brazil (with Slava Grigoryan)	Released: February 2004; Label: ABC Classics (476 1560); Format: CD, digital download	66
Embraceable You (with Adelaide Symphony Orchestra)	Released: 2007; Label: ABC Classics; Format: CD, digital download	—
An Australian in Paris	Released: 2012; Label: ABC Classics (476 4837); Format: CD, digital download	
Flute Spirit: Dreams and Improvisations	Released: 2014; Label: Jane Rutter; Format: digital download	
Fire and Water: An Irish Fantasy	Released: 2017; Label: ABC Classics; Format: CD, digital download	
French Kiss	Released: 2017; Label: ABC Classics; Format: CD, digital download	
Evening Star (with Peter Cousens)	Released: December 2019; Format: Digital; Label: Jane Rutter	-

== Awards and nominations ==
In 2016, Rutter was awarded the Ordre des Arts et des Lettres.

=== ARIA Music Awards ===
The ARIA Music Awards is an annual awards ceremony that recognises excellence, innovation, and achievement across all genres of Australian music. They commenced in 1987.

Year	Nominee / work	Award	Result	Ref.
1990	Nocturnes & Preludes for Flutes	Best Classical Album	Nominated	
2004	Brazil (with Slava Grigoryan)	Best World Music Album	Nominated	
2012	An Australian in Paris	Best Original Soundtrack, Cast or Show Album	Nominated	
2014	Flute Spirit: Dreams and Improvisations	Best World Music Album	Nominated	
