= Joueurs de flûte =

1924 compositions by Albert Roussel

Joueurs de flûte (The Flute Players), Op. 27, is a set of four pieces for flute and piano by the French composer Albert Roussel. It is the most popular of Roussel's works for the flute.

It was written in 1924 and consists of four pieces, each named after a flute player from literature and each dedicated to a flutist of Roussel's time.

1. Pan

- 'Pan' is named after the half-goat, half-man god of nature in Greek mythology, who is often depicted playing the flute, and after whom the panflute is named. The piece employs the Dorian mode (with flattened thirds and sevenths) that was used in ancient Greece.
- 'Pan' is dedicated to Marcel Moyse (the dedicatee of many other musical works).

2. Tityre

- 'Tityre' is named after the lucky shepherd in Virgil's 'Eclogues' (or 'Bucolics'). It is the shortest of the four pieces that together form a kind of sonatine, in which this piece plays to an extent the role of a scherzo.
- 'Tityre' is dedicated to Gaston Blanquart (1877–1962), a flutist who taught at the Conservatoire de Paris.

3. Krishna

- 'Krishna' is named after the Hindu god, probably particularly referring to the period in his youth as the divine herdsman, where Krishna played the flute, mesmerizing people and animals. Also in the music Roussel uses here a typical North-Indian musical scale ('Raga Shri', with flattened second and sixth, augmented fourth, perfect fifth, major third and seventh) from that region, that he visited in 1909.
- 'Krishna' is dedicated to Louis Fleury, to whom Claude Debussy dedicated Syrinx.

4. Monsieur de la Péjaudie

- 'Monsieur de la Péjaudie' is named after the protagonist of a novel by Henri de Régnier, 'La Pécheresse' (The Sinful Woman). M. de la Péjaudie is a fantastic flute-player but is more interested in playing women than the flute. Roussel earlier already had put some poems of Régnier, whom he highly regarded, on music.
- 'Monsieur de la Péjaudie' is dedicated to Philippe Gaubert, a flutist, conductor and composer who mainly wrote for the flute.

== External links and main sources ==
- ('what titles don't tell')
- (program notes) (archive)
- (flute legends)
- CD-booklet of Sharon Bezaly's album 'French Delights' (BIS-SACD-1639), 2007.
- Joueurs de flûte: Scores at the International Music Score Library Project
