= French Flute School =

The French Flute School, as practiced by pupils of Paul Taffanel at the Paris Conservatoire, employed a playing style featuring a light tone and vibrato. Students strived to capture the sound quality of Taffanel in their own playing. Louis Fleury described Taffanel's tone as, "captivating, and also very full."This reference of a full sound has often been described as powerful and brassy, which can be taken as derogatory. However, when Gaubert was questioned once about this, he redressed the balance by reiterating the word 'full' by insisting that Taffanel produced a perfectly homogeneous tone throughout the entire range of the instrument. This became fundamental quality common to the great flautists of the French School and can be seen in Taffanel's successors. These flautists used metal flutes of the modified Boehm system by Louis Lot and others. This stood in contrast to the mostly wooden German and English instruments, which their flautists played with a strong and steady sound.

== Spreading influence ==
The generation of Taffanel's pupils was one when musical performance and education were rapidly becoming more common. A corresponding increase in the Conservatoire's productivity helped extend these pupils' influence. The graduation rate under the professorships of Louis Dorus and Joseph-Henri Altès had averaged slightly less than one per year; 35 students won first prizes between 1866 and 1899. During the next 40-year period, from 1900 to 1939, the number of first-prize students doubled to 86. This number included an unprecedented five students graduating in the same year—1920. This rate increased still more rapidly in the 1940s, with 48 first prizes awarded to graduates of two flute classes at the Conservatoire.

As the number of graduates increased, so did the opportunities for work. While solo wind recitals remained uncommon, the number of orchestral concerts in Paris between 1906 and the late 1920s doubled to 1880 a year. By 1930, the Conservatoire had become the top of a national pyramid of musical education in France which included 23 branch academies, 21 "national" schools and 20 municipal schools.

== Beyond France ==
For various reasons, those pupils of Taffanel's who spread their teacher's influence most widely as teachers operated primarily in the United States. These students included Georges Barrère, René Le Roy and Marcel Moyse. This may explain why the French Flute School had a strong influence on flute-playing there in the early 20th century.
