= Blanche Honegger Moyse =

American conductor (1909–2011)

Blanche Honegger Moyse (/moʊˈiːz/; September 23, 1909 – February 10, 2011) was a Swiss-born American conductor who lived in Brattleboro, Vermont at the time of her death. She was particularly admired for her devotion to the choral works of Johann Sebastian Bach and her ability to draw deeply moving performances from both amateur and professional musicians. Soprano Arleen Auger has said of her, "I’ve sung Bach all over the world, often with people who are considered the best, and in my opinion no one is performing Bach any better than Blanche Moyse is doing it in Brattleboro."

== Early life ==
Moyse was born in Geneva, Switzerland, where she began the study of violin at the age of eight. She went on to study with Adolf Busch, and made her debut at the age of 16, when she played the Beethoven violin concerto with l'Orchestre de la Suisse Romande. She married the pianist and flutist Louis Moyse and, with Moyse's father, flautist Marcel Moyse, formed the Moyse Trio.

== Move to the United States ==
In 1949, the Moyses moved to Marlboro, Vermont at the invitation of Busch and Rudolf Serkin, and helped found the Marlboro Music Festival. Moyse also chaired the music department at Marlboro College for the next 25 years, and founded the Brattleboro Music Center in 1952.

== Conducting ==
Her violin career ended in 1966 with an injury to her bow arm, but she went on to become a much admired conductor of the choral works of Bach. She made her Carnegie Hall debut at the age of 78, conducting the Blanche Moyse Chorale and the Orchestra of St. Luke's in a production of Bach's Christmas Oratorio, and she continued to conduct Bach's major choral works—the Mass in B Minor, the St Matthew Passion and the St John Passion—at annual concerts of the New England Bach Festival well into her 90s. In 2000 Blanche Moyse was awarded the Alfred Nash Patterson Lifetime Achievement Award by Choral Arts New England in recognition of her exceptional contributions to choruses and the appreciation of choral music in New England.

She had been pointed out by the writer Benjamin Ivry as perhaps having been "classical music's best kept secret". The Wall Street Journal critic Greg Sandow said of her performance of Bach's St. John Passion at the age of 89: "Sometimes you hear a concert that sticks with you. For months you think about it, keeping it alive in your mind, unable to banish it merely to memory."

== Death ==
Moyse died at her home in Brattleboro, Vermont, on February 10, 2011, at the age of 101.
