= Syrinx (Debussy) =

Composition for solo flute by Claude Debussy

- Solo music by Claude Debussy
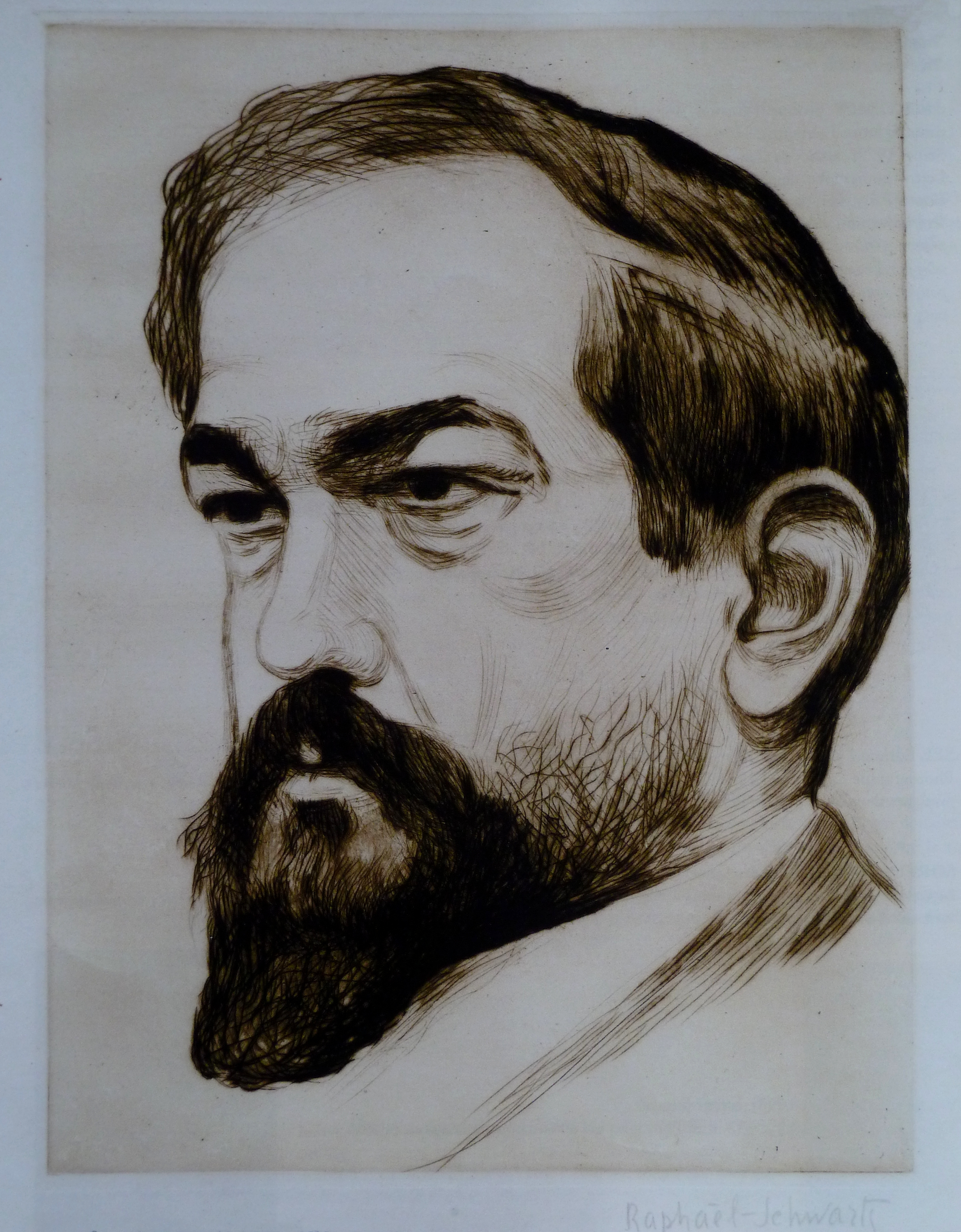
- Claude Debussy, 1912 portrait by Raphael Schwartz
- Catalogue: L. 137
- Based on: Syrinx
- Composed: 1913
- Scoring: flute

Syrinx
Performed by Sarah Bassingthwaighte

Syrinx, L. 137, is a piece of music for solo flute which Claude Debussy wrote in 1913. It generally takes three minutes or less to perform. It was the first significant piece for solo flute after the Sonata in A minor composed by C. P. E. Bach over 150 years before (1747), and it is the first such solo composition for the modern Böhm flute, developed in 1847.

Syrinx is commonly considered to be an indispensable part of the flute repertoire. Many musical historians believe that "Syrinx", which gives the performer generous room for interpretation and emotion, played a pivotal role in the development of solo flute music in the early twentieth century. According to flautist Marcel Moyse, Syrinx was originally written by Debussy without barlines or breath marks. Moyse may have later added these, and most publishers publish his edition of the work.

Syrinx has also been transposed and performed on the saxophone and other instruments. It quickly became a piece of standard literature for the saxophone, and has been recorded on both the alto and soprano saxophones. It is also a track on Caprice by the trumpeter Alison Balsom .

== Background ==
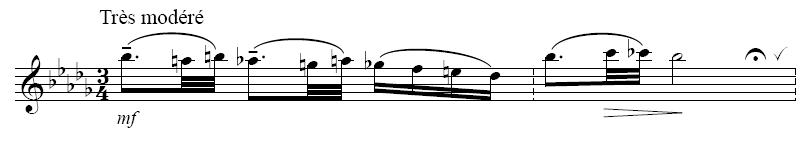
The opening

The piece is commonly performed off stage, as it is thought when Debussy dedicated the piece to the flutist Louis Fleury, it was for him to play during the interval of one of Debussy's ballets.

Syrinx was written as part of incidental music to the play Psyché by Gabriel Mourey, and was originally called "Flûte de Pan". It was given its final name in reference to the myth of the amorous pursuit of the nymph Syrinx by the god Pan, in which Pan falls in love with Syrinx. Syrinx, however, does not return the love to Pan; she turns herself into a water reed and hides in the marshes. Pan cuts the reeds to make his pipes, in turn killing his love.
