= Georges Marty =

French conductor and composer

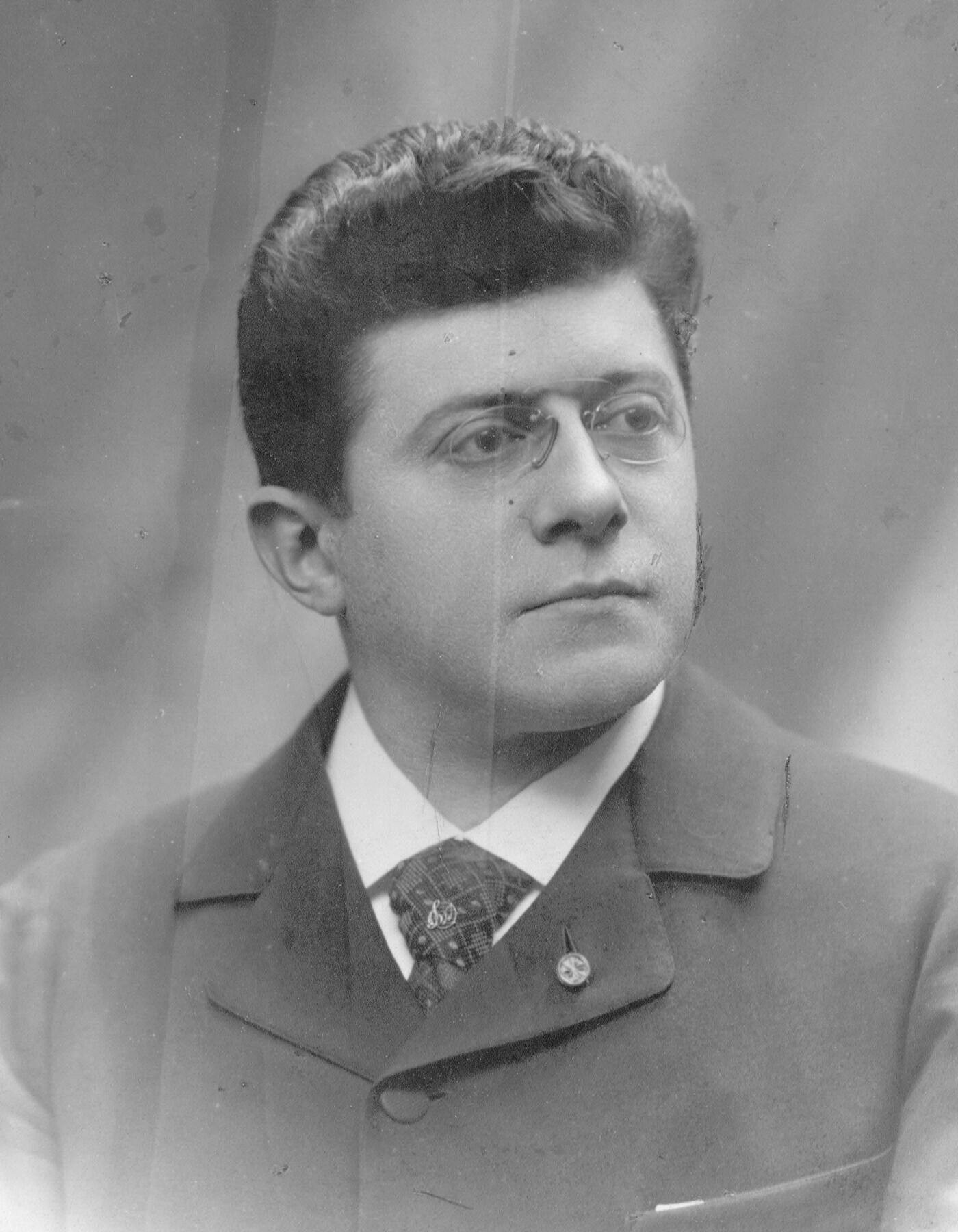
Georges Marty

Georges-Eugène Marty (Paris, 16 May 1860 – Paris, 11 October 1908) was a French conductor and composer associated with both major opera houses in Paris.

== Career ==
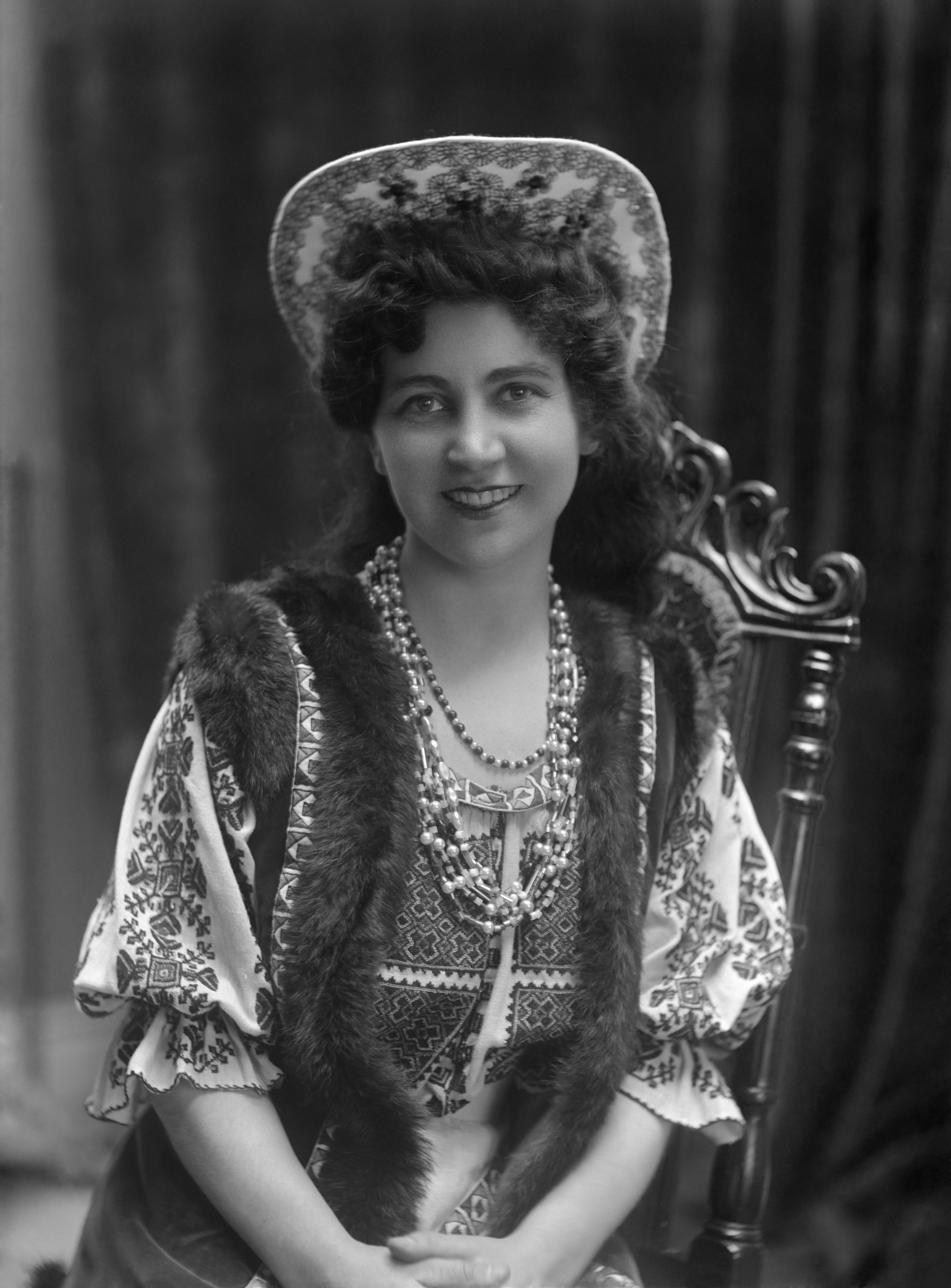
Lilly Walleni in the title role of his opera Daria

Showing musical talent very early on, and entering the Paris Conservatoire aged 12, he won the first prize for solfege there in 1875. Marty took the first prize for harmony in 1878 and the Prix de Rome in 1882 with his cantata Edith (he was a pupil of Massenet). After his stay in Rome, he travelled to Sicily, Tunisia and Germany before returning to the French capital and gaining much experience as a chorus master.

His compositions include Ballade d’hiver (1885), Overture Balthasar (1887), Matinée de printemps (1888), Lysic (1888), Merlin enchanté, art songs and piano works. Le duc de Ferrare, a drame lyrique in three acts, was composed after his return from Rome but first performed only on 30 May 1899 (at the Théâtre de la Renaissance, with Gabriel Soulacroix, Louis Delaquerrière and Mary Lebey). He became the teacher of the vocal ensemble class at the Conservatoire in 1892, and head of singing at the Opéra in 1893.

Marty was involved in productions at Théâtre Lyrique including Samson et Dalila, and of La jolie fille de Perth at the Eden Theatre. At the Opéra he participated in productions of Gwendoline, Djelma, Tannhäuser, Messidor and Die Meistersinger von Nürnberg. When the Paris Opéra concerts were created he conducted modern orchestral works.

He made his debut at the Opéra Comique was conducting Manon on 11 March 1900; he then conducted the first ever production at the Salle Favart of Iphigénie en Tauride in June that year. His repertoire also included Joseph, Mireille and Les visitandines and the creation of Le follet and Phoebé.

Marty was the conductor of the Orchestre de la Société des Concerts du Conservatoire from 12 June 1901 to 11 October 1908, directing a wide repertoire from Bach to contemporary composers, giving and several local premieres.

In 1906 he replaced Jules Danbé at the Casino de Vichy classical concerts, but although in otherwise good health, he died there from disease of the liver just as the 1908 season was finishing. His wife was a mezzo-soprano active in both the opera house and on the concert platform; his only son was killed at the beginning of the First World War.

Cultural offices
Preceded by Paul Taffanel	Principal Conductor, Orchestre de la Société des Concerts du Conservatoire; 1901–1908	Succeeded by André Messager
