= Maxence Larrieu =

French flutist (born 1934)

- Born: 27 October 1934 (age 91); Marseille, France
- Genres: Classical
- Occupation: Classical musician
- Instrument: Flute

Maxence Larrieu (born 27 October 1934 in Marseille) is a French classical flautist.

== Career ==
He studied flute from age 10 at the Marseille Conservatory of Music with Joseph Rampal, who was the father of Jean-Pierre Rampal. In 1958, Larrieu won the first prize at the International Geneva Competition. He has won 12 Grand Prix du Disque.

He has over 100 recordings to his credit, has won many awards and has recorded with orchestras from several countries including I Musici, l’Ensemble Instrumental, Chamber Orchestra of the Sarre, Orchestre de chambre Jean-François Paillard, and the Philharmonic of Turin.

He was the tutor of Massimo Mercelli.

== “Maxence Larrieu" international flute competition ==
Since 2007, he has held an annual flute competition.
