= Adolphe Hennebains =

French flautist and music teacher

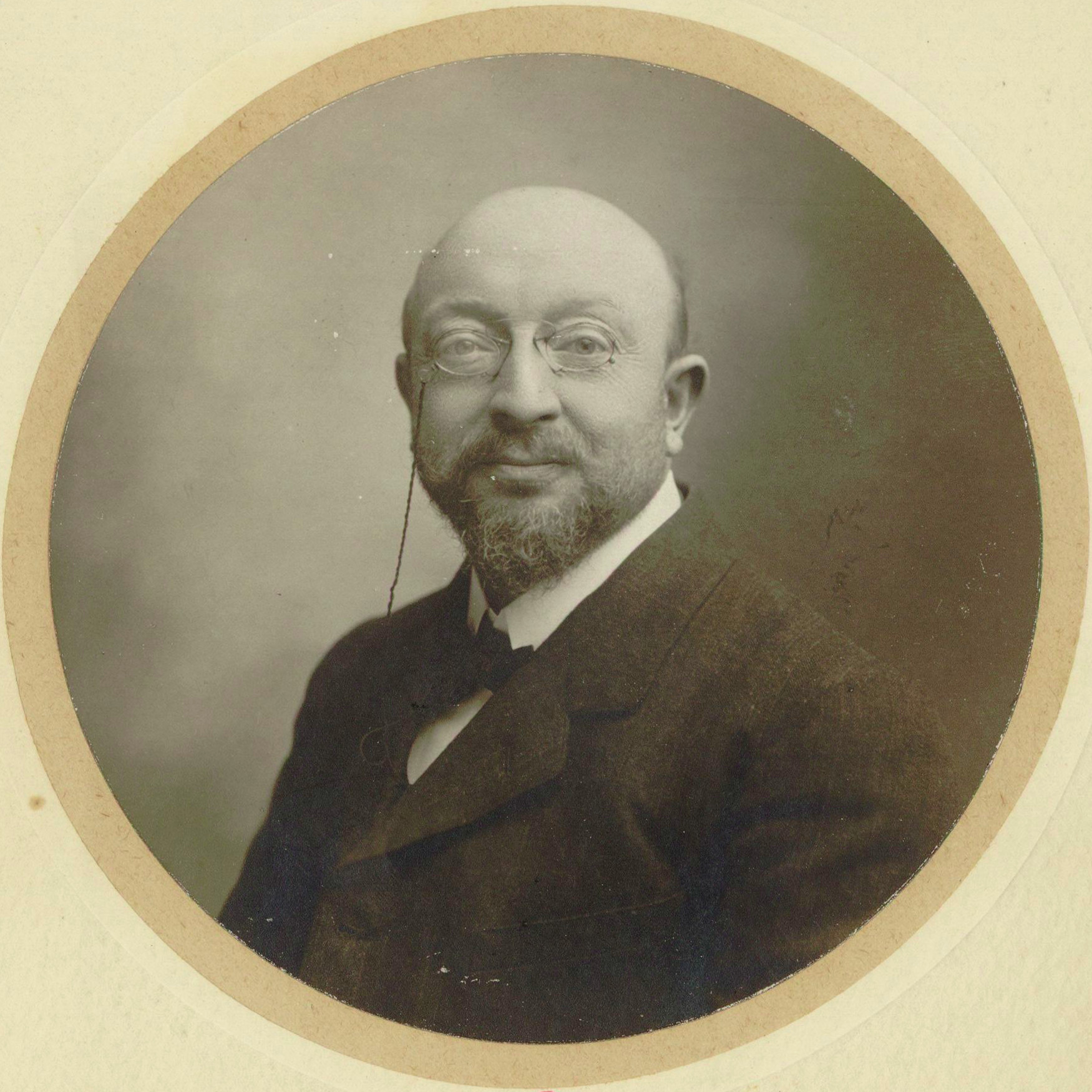
- Adolphe Hennebains in 1907.
- Born: Adolphe Joseph Hennebains; 14 November 1862; Saint-Omer
- Died: 17 September 1914 (aged 51); Plougasnou
- Occupations: Flautist; Music pedagogue

Adolphe Hennebains (14 November 1862 – 17 September 1914) was a French classical flautist and music teacher.

== Biography ==
Hennebains came from a large shoemaker family. In 1878, he entered the class of Joseph-Henri Altès at the Conservatoire de Paris and received his first prize in 1880. The same year, he was a solo flute player at the Pasdeloup Orchestra and - after his military service - in 1884, solo flute to the Concerts Lamoureux. In 1890, he joined the Orchestre de l'Opéra national de Paris where he was flute solo in 1892. From 1893, Hennebains was assistant to Paul Taffanel at the Conservatoire de Paris and his successor during the 1909 summer. Among his pupils were René Le Roy, Marcel Moyse and Joseph Rampal. As chamber music partner, Hennebains played with Ferruccio Busoni, Alfred Cortot, George Enescu and Wanda Landowska.
