= Fantaisie, Op. 79 (Fauré) =

1898 piece for flute and piano

Fantaisie
- by Gabriel Fauré
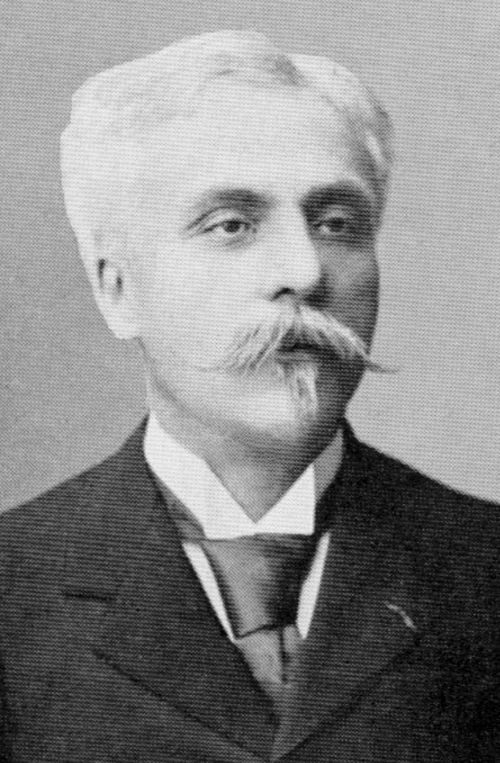
- Fauré in 1895
- Key: E minor / C major
- Opus: 79
- Composed: 1898
- Dedication: Paul Taffanel
- Duration: 4 minutes 30 seconds
- Movements: two
- Scoring: Flute; Piano

Premiere
- Date: 28 July 1898
- Location: Conservatoire de Paris, Paris
- Performers: Students of Paul Taffanel

The Fantaisie for flute and piano, Op. 79, is a chamber music composition written by Gabriel Fauré in 1898.

== History ==
The Fantaisie was commissioned by and dedicated to Paul Taffanel in 1898 for the "Concours de flute", a flute competition held by the Conservatoire de Paris. Taffanel, who took over a flute class in 1893, regularly commissioned new compositions for the annual competition, and over time amassed a whole repertoire of technically challenging pieces suitable for the Conservatoire's requirements. Joachim Andersen, who composed the piece in 1895, received the following instructions: "The piece should be short: 5 or 6 minutes at most. I will leave the form of it entirely up to you; whether an Andante followed by an Allegro, or a single movement, but it needs to contain the wherewithal to test the examinees on matters of phrasing, expression, tone control, and virtuosity. The accompaniment should be for piano."

Fauré strictly adhered to the instructions, and received Taffanel's help in creating the flute part, thanking him in a letter dated to June 1898: "Forgive me for not having thanked you immediately: I have been constantly busy here. Your revision is perfect and I beg you to make as many changes you want, and not to worry at all. I will be extremely grateful." As the autograph has been lost, it is unclear how much Taffanel changed.

The Fantaisie, together with a smaller sight-reading piece titled Morceau de lecture, were given an eightfold premiere at the competition on 28 July 1898, namely by all of Taffanel's students. The first prize was awarded to Gaston Blanquart.

The Fantaisie has since become a firm part of the flute repertoire. It was orchestrated by Louis Aubert in 1957.

== Music ==
Fantaisie, Op. 79
Performed by Alex Murray (flute) and Martha Goldstein (piano)

External audio
- Fantaisie, Op. 79, orchestrated by Louis Aubert, performed by William Bennett and the Academy of St Martin in the Fields under Neville Marriner

The Fantaisie consists of two movements separated only by a grand pause:

1. Andantino . = 50 (6/8, E minor)
2. Allegro = 144 (2/4, C major)

The first 18 bars of the introduction were also used for Fauré's incidental music to Pelléas et Mélisande, Op. 80, written at the same time. The long phrases in the flute part require good breath control.

In the second movement, faster second section demands agility, good intonation, and towards the end, an even tone throughout the registers.

Fauré specified a playing time of 4 1/2 minutes.
