= Marlboro Music School and Festival =

Music training program in Marlboro, Vermont, United States since 1951

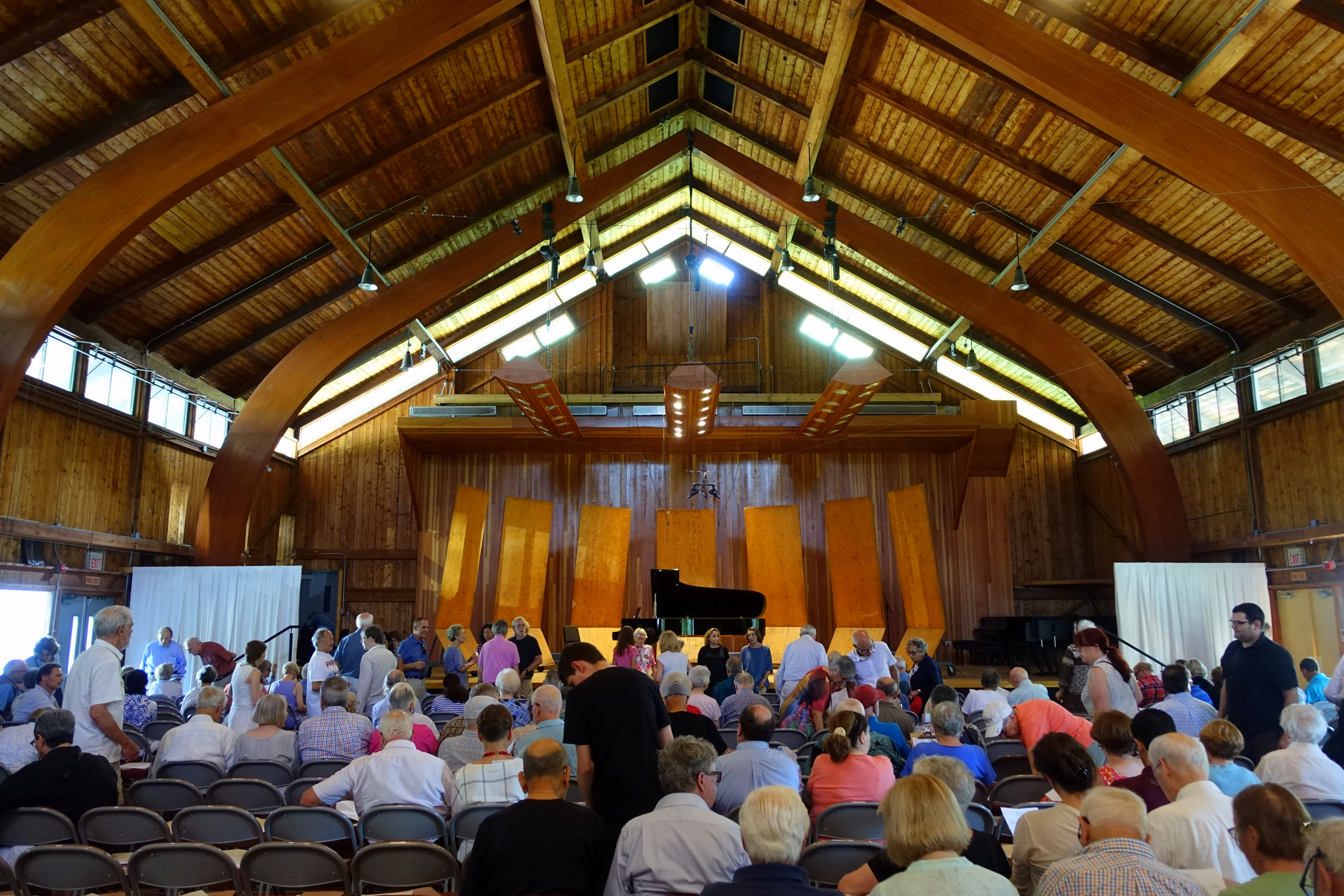
- Persons Auditorium before a concert.
- Dates: 1951–present
- Locations: Marlboro, Vermont, United States
- Coordinates: 42°50′20.57″N 72°43′56.04″W
- Years active: 1951–present
- Founders: Adolf Busch; Hermann Busch; Marcel Moyse; Blanche Honegger Moyse; Louis Moyse; Rudolf Serkin
- Website: www.marlboromusic.org

The Marlboro Music School and Festival is a retreat for advanced classical training and musicianship held for seven weeks each summer in Marlboro, Vermont, in the United States. Public performances are held each weekend while the school is in session, with the programs chosen only a week or so in advance from the sixty to eighty works being currently rehearsed. Marlboro Music was conceived as a retreat where young musicians could collaborate and learn alongside master artists in an environment removed from the pressures of performance deadlines or recording. It combines several functions; Alex Ross describes it as functioning "variously as a chamber-music festival, a sort of finishing school for gifted young performers, and a summit for the musical intelligentsia".

== History ==
Adolf Busch and his son-in-law Rudolf Serkin moved to Vermont in the 1940s as refugees from the Third Reich. Busch was not Jewish, but he left Germany due to being in opposition to National Socialist rule. They became close friends of Walter F. Hendricks, who founded Marlboro College on the site of a former dairy farm. He asked their advice on the formation of a music department. On their advice, he recruited Marcel Moyse, Louis Moyse and Blanche Moyse – also refugees, and ill-situated – to Marlboro. Busch, Serkin, and the Moyse trio are the recognized founders of Marlboro Music, through their association with the college. But it was Busch, writes biographer Tully Potter, who provided the first impetus, as he "had long wanted to create an environment in which professional players and rank amateurs could make music together, studying the chamber literature in depth and giving concerts only when and if they wished to do so." An attempt to realize this wish came in 1950 with a summer school lasting from July 1–13, with few students, that is "not regarded part of the 'official' Marlboro canon". The following year, Busch and Serkin "turned down an invitation to the Edinburgh Festival to concentrate on their own project," says Potter. They attracted 54 "participating artists" (students) in what is now recognized as the first Marlboro summer festival. After Busch's untimely death on June 9, 1952, Serkin devoted great attention to continuing his beloved father-in-law's work; he became its guiding light for the rest of his life. He valued Marlboro's small size and rural environment, inviting colleagues to come to, says Ross, "lose their worldliness, to fall into a slower rhythm."

Marlboro's purpose moved away from Busch's idea of amateur participation; instead leading professionals from both solo and orchestral positions work with young musicians of the highest promise and achievement, who must pass through a rigorous audition process to be accepted. Prominent musicians associated with Marlboro have included Pierre-Laurent Aimard, Emanuel Ax, Joshua Bell, Jonathan Biss, Anner Bylsma, Pablo Casals, Nikki Chooi, Jeremy Denk, Leon Fleisher, Gary Graffman, Hilary Hahn, Mieczysław Horszowski, Gilbert Kalish, Anton Kuerti, Lang Lang, James Levine, Yo-Yo Ma, Mischa Maisky, Viktoria Mullova, Siegfried Palm, Murray Perahia, Lara St. John, Richard Stoltzman, and Sándor Végh.

Marlboro has had enormous influence on American chamber music. The Guarneri Quartet was formed at Marlboro in 1964; Yo-Yo Ma and Emanuel Ax, a long-standing duo, concertized together as a duo for the first time at Marlboro, on August 3, 1973. (Ma, incidentally, met his wife Jill there, one of many musical couples to meet at Marlboro.) Other groups associated with Marlboro in various ways have included the Emerson Quartet, Juilliard Quartet, Orion String Quartet, St. Lawrence Quartet, and Beaux Arts Trio.

Since 2018, the Marlboro Music School and Festival has been led by Artistic Co-Directors Mitsuko Uchida and Jonathan Biss.

During non-summer months, the festival runs the Musicians From Marlboro national touring program, with performances in many U.S. cities each year.

A tradition Serkin began of ending the summer with a performance of the Beethoven Choral Fantasy – in which most participants, even non-singers, joined in the chorus – was discontinued with his death in 1991, but was reinstated a few years later. As then co-director Richard Goode told Alex Ross, "Many people felt that Serkin playing the Choral Fantasy was a unique experience that could never be duplicated. After he died, the work was retired, and I thought that was the right decision. To my surprise, a few years later people said, 'You know, I think we have to have a Choral Fantasy.' We needed the catharsis."

Also, the Festival still commemorates Busch's birthday, August 8, with a special concert.

== Directors ==
External audio
- You may listen to the Marlboro Festival Orchestra conducted by Pablo Casals with Rudolf Serkin, Peter Serkin, and Alexander Schneider performing: Johann Sebastian Bach's Brandenburg Concertos No 1-6 in 1965; Here on Archive.org
- You may hear the Marlboro Festival Orchestra conducted by Alexander Schneider with Rudolf Serkin in Wolfgang Mozart's: Piano Concerto No. 9 in E flat major, K. 271; Piano Concerto No. 12 in A major, K. 414 in 1957 Here on archive.org

Artistic Directors, 1951–present
Year	Director(s)
1951–1991	Rudolf Serkin (March 28, 1903 – May 8, 1991)
1999–2013	Mitsuko Uchida (born December 20, 1948) and Richard Goode (born June 1, 1943)
2013–2018	Mitsuko Uchida (born December 20, 1948)
2018–present	Mitsuko Uchida (born December 20, 1948) and Jonathan Biss (born September 18, 1980)
