= Gabriel Mourey =

French novelist, poet, playwright and art critic

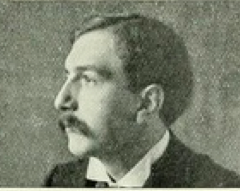
- Mourey in 1900
- Born: Marie Gabriel Mourey; 23 September 1865; Marseille, France
- Died: 10 February 1943 (aged 77); Neuilly-sur-Seine, France
- Occupations: Novelist; Essayist; Poet; Playwright; Translator

Marie Gabriel Mourey (23 September 1865 – 10 February 1943) was a French novelist, essayist, poet, playwright, translator and art critic.

== Biography ==
Gabriel Mourey was born 23 September 1865 in Marseille, the son of Louis-Félix Mourey, a druggist, and Amélie-Madeleine Roche-Latilla.

He began his career as a poet at the age of seventeen with the collection Voix éparses (1883) published in the Librairie des bibliophiles by Jules Rouam (Paris). In March 1884, he launched Mireille, revue des poètes marseillais, with Raoul Russel, which had eight deliveries.

For the Parisian publisher Camille Dalou, he published his first translation from English, the Poésies complètes de Edgar Allan Poe (1889) with a preface by Joséphin Péladan; He subsequently translated poems by Algernon Charles Swinburne. From then on, the poet approached the symbolist trend and became friends with Claude Debussy, and met in Edmond Bailly's Librairie de l'art indépendant, the "master of the dream" Stéphane Mallarmé, of whom he attended the "Tuesdays of the Rue de Rome". The following year, he published his first essay of art criticism, Les Arts de la vie et le règne de la laideur at Paul Ollendorff, a rather reactionary essay that denounced impressionism, the realistic or naturalist drifts of painting, and which was more on the side of William Morris, the Pre-Raphaelite Brotherhood and John Ruskin, and in which he affirmed that "it is the spirit of anarchism that reigns in France in the artistic movement... a need for destruction, a sort of delirium that wants to abolish everything that exists." Mourey was much more open during the following decades; he was commissioned by the Ministry of Fine Arts from 1895 onwards, and served as a link between the emerging English, Italian, Russian and Parisian decorative arts, and then saluted the advent of the Art Nouveau style. He wrote for catalogs of the Bing gallery and the Maison moderne, defended Albert Besnard, Felix Borchardt, Auguste Rodin, Edmond Aman-Jean, Edgar Chahine, etc.

Basically, this versatile writer was a promoter in the hexagon of the Pre-Raphaelites and the Arts and Crafts movement. Erecting the latter as a model, with a tendency to idealize his supposed success, Mourey argued for an art with a social vocation [...]. As a number of his contemporaries, and as an art for all, his ideas found one of their extensions in 1904–1905 in the ephemeral magazine Les Arts de la vie, which he created and directed [at Larousse]. He thus evoked this "bankruptcy of modern decorative art" in France, for a production he considered to be elitist, not having been able to show a real agreement between artists and manufacturers, unlike, according to him, the English or German achievements.

Between 1888 and 1905, he held a correspondence with Jean Lorrain in which the two men sometimes showed an appalling cruelty to their contemporaries.

From 1891, he wanted to become a playwright with Lawn-tennis, a one-act play written for André Antoine's Théâtre Libre, but then withdrawn because of objections to its violent representation of a lesbian relationship. Then in 1893 he wrote with Paul Adam Automne, a three-act drama, which was banned by censorship on 3 February, and which gave rise to a stormy session in the Chamber of Deputies on 6 March 1893 with the intervention of Maurice Barrès: The latter, deputy of Nancy, then opposed the interior minister Charles Dupuy, who asked to remove from the text everything that recalled the fusillade du Brûlé at La Ricamarie: in 1869, in the coalfield of Saint-Etienne, where the troops fired on the strikers.

With Armand Dayot he drew attention to the 18th-century English school of painting, then partly forgotten.

In 1900, he founded the Société nouvelle de peintres et de sculpteurs ("New Society of Painters and Sculptors") with French, German and English artists, which he presided until 1907; The Paris headquarters was located at Georges Petit's gallery.

In 1913, he was made chevalier of the Légion d'honneur, under the patronage of Charles Plumet.

After the war, he became inspector of national museums.

During his career as a critic, Gabriel Mourey wrote for many newspapers, such as Gil Blas, Le Journal (1911), The Studio, the Revue encyclopédique, L'Illustration, the Revue de Paris... He was chief editor of the Art & Décoration magazine.

One of his most popular translations was The Book of Tea by Okakura Kakuzō.

Mourey died 10 February 1943 in Neuilly-sur-Seine.

== Mourey and Debussy ==
Composed in 1913, as a short piece for solo flute after Psyché, a dramatic poem in three acts by Gabriel Mourey, Syrinx, the fruit of this friendship, remains the only composition of Debussy that was completed in the framework of their many projects.

A contributor to the Revue wagnérienne, Mourey had many friends in common with Debussy and was the intermediary between him and Gabriele D’Annunzio for Le Martyre de saint Sébastien. Projects in cooperation with Debussy which never realised were: L’Embarquement pour ailleurs, commentaire symphonique, 1891; Histoire de Tristan, drame lyrique, 1907–09 ; Huon de Bordeaux, 1909 ; Le Chat botté, d'après Jean de La Fontaine, 1909 ; Le Marchand de rêves , 1909.

== Works ==
=== Poetry ===
- Voix éparses..., Paris, Librairie des bibliophiles, 1883.
- Flammes mortes, Paris, C. Dalou, 1888.
- L'Embarquement pour ailleurs, Paris, Albert Savine, 1890, reworked reprint: H. Simonis Empis, 1893.
- Le Miroir : poèmes, Paris, Société du Mercure de France, 1908.
- Le Chant du renouveau, poèmes de guerre, Paris, Berger-Levrault, 1916.
- La gloire de Saint-Marc : vingt-trois gravures en couleurs d'après les aquarelles de Augusto Sezanne, poems in prose, Paris, Plon, 1920.
- L'Oreiller des fièvres et les chansons de Leïla, adorned with engravings on wood by Augustin Carrera, Librairie de France, 1922.
- Marie-Madeleine à la Sainte-Baume, poem decorated with 16th century woodcut, Aix-en-Provence, éditions d'art de la revue Le Feu, 1925.

=== Translations ===
- Poèmes complets by Edgar Allan Poe, preface by Joséphin Péladan, Paris, C. Dalou, 1889. Reissue, preceded by a letter from John H. Ingram and followed by La Philosophie de la composition, and biographical and bibliographic notes, Paris, Mercure de France, 1910.
- Poèmes et ballades d'Algernon Charles Swinburne, notes by Guy de Maupassant, Paris, Albert Savine, 1891.
- Chants d'avant l'aube de Swinburne, Paris, P.-V. Stock, 1909.
- The Book of Tea by Okakura Kakuzō, translated from English, Paris, Delpeuch, 1927, reprint by Payot, 1931 — Read online.
- Jacques Zoubaloff, Politian, comte de Leicester, incidental music for Edgar Poe's drama, translation by Gabriel Mourey, score piano and singing, Paris, Maurice Sénart, 1927.

=== Director of publication ===
- Mireille, revue des poètes marseillais with Raoul Russel, Marseille rue Sainte, 1884 — Read online.
- Les Arts de la vie paraissant sous la direction de Gabriel Mourey, Paris, Larousse, 1904-1905 — Read online.

=== Essays and prefaces ===
- Les Arts de la vie et le règne de la laideur, Paris, Paul Ollendorff, 1890, reissued 1899.
- Passé le Détroit, la vie et l'art à Londres, Paris, Paul Ollendorff, 1895.
- Des hommes devant la nature et la vie, Paris, P. Ollendorff / Société d'éditions littéraires et artistiques, 1902. 'Comprend des notes sur Auguste Rodin, Helleu, Le Sidaner, Steinlen, E. Claus, P. Renouard, Ch. Cottet, J. W. Alexander, J.-F. Raffaelli, F. Thaulow, G. La Touche, A. Baertsoen, Aman-Jean, A. Lepère.
- La Maison moderne. Documents sur l'art industriel au vingtième siècle : reproductions photographiques des principales œuvres des collaborateurs de La Maison moderne, with nine etchings by Félix Vallotton, Paris, Édition de La Maison moderne, 1901.
- Préface à Documents décoratifs : panneaux décoratifs, études des applications de fleurs, papier peints, frises, vitraux, orfévrerieby Alfons Mucha, Paris, Librairie centrale des beaux-arts, [c. 1902 ?].
- Œuvres de Felix Borchardt exposées à l'Art nouveau Bing, Paris, April 1902.
- Poèmes arméniens anciens et modernes traduits par Archag Tchobanian et précédés d'une étude de Gabriel Mourey sur la poésie et l'art arméniens, Paris, A. Charles, 1902.
- Ignacio Zuloaga, Paris, Manzi & Joyant, 1905.
- Albert Besnard, with 100 reproductions out of text including nine in color and one original etching, Paris, H. Davoust, 1905.
- Gainsborough : Biographie critique, Paris, Henri Laurens, 1906.
- Fêtes foraines de Paris, etchings by Edgar Chahine, Paris, P. Renouard, 1906.

Reprint with 72 drawings by François Quelvée, Paris, André Delpeuch, 1927.

- Regards sur l'âme ombrienne, [n.p., 1907].
- D.-G. Rossetti et les Préraphaélites anglais : biographies critiques, Paris, Henri Laurens, 1909.
- with Armand Dayot, Anglaises et Françaises. Écoles du XVIIIe siècle, Paris, [s.n.], 1909.
- Preface to Exposition de peintures et d’eaux-fortes de Philip Zilcken, Paris, Galérie d’art décoratif, 1911.
- Le village dans la pinède : Mazargues (Bouches-du-Rhône), Paris, Mercure de France, 1911.
- Exposition Daniel Vierge, 11 janvier-12 février 1912, Paris, Musée des arts décoratif, 1912.
- Exposition Mathurin Méheut : la mer, faune et flore, oeuvres diverses, du 28 octobre au 24 décembre 1913, Paris, Musée des arts décoratifs, [1913].
- Propos sur les beautés du temps présent, Paris, Ollendorff, 1913.
- La Guerre devant le palais : Compiègne 1914, Paris, P. Ollendorff, 1915.
- Essai sur l'art décoratif français moderne, Paris, Librairie Ollendorff, 1921.
- Histoire générale de l'art français de la Révolution à nos jours, Paris, Librairie de France, 1922.Translated in English: French art in the XIX century, London, The Studio Ltd., 1928.
- La Vérité sur la cour des métiers : Ce qu'elle est ... aurait du être ... pouvait être, Paris, Librairie de France, 1925.
- Preface to La Vie et les œuvres de quelques grands saints by Émile Baumann, Paris, Librairie de France, 1926.
- Eugène Delacroix, with 24 phototypies, Paris, Librairie de France, 1927.
- François Quelvée, Paris, éditions de la N.R.F, 1928.
- La Peinture anglaise du XVIIIe siècle, Paris, G. Van Oest, 1928.
- Le Livre des fêtes françaises, Paris, Librairie de France, 1930.
- Georges Dufrénoy, Paris, Georges Crès, [1930].
- Preface to Serge Yourievitch [?], with 24 phototypes, Paris, Librairie de France, [1930?].
- Tableau de l'art français des origines à nos jours, Tome I à IV, Paris, Delagrave, 1932–1938.
- Achille Ouvré, [S.l.] : [s.n.].

=== Theatre and librettos ===
- Lawn-tennis, pièce en un acte, with a letter by André Antoine, Paris, Tresse and Stock, 1891.
- with Paul Adam, L'Automne : drame en trois actes; Prohibited by censorship on 3 February 1893, Paris, E. Kolb, 1893.
- Trois cœurs, pièce en un acte, Paris, P.-V. Stock, premiered at Théâtre de l'Odéon on 5 April 1897.
- Psyché : poème dramatique en trois actes, Paris, Mercure de France, 1913.
- Guillaume d'Orange : geste en cinq actes et six tableaux, Paris, P. Ollendorff, 1914.
- Daphnis, poème dramatique en un acte, Paris, Librairie de France, 1925.

=== Novels and short stories ===
- Monada, Paris, P. Ollendorff, 1894.
- Les brisants, Paris, P. Ollendorff, 1896.
- L'Œuvre nuptiale, Paris, Alphonse Lemerre, 1896.
- Cœurs en détresse, Paris, P. Ollendorff, 1898.
- 1 heure : la Bourse, collection Beltrand and Dété, series « Les minutes parisiennes », illustrated by Charles Huard, Paris, P. Ollendorff, 1899 — on Gallica.
- Jeux passionnés, Paris, P. Ollendorff, 1901.
- Sainte Douceline, béguine de Provence : 1214-1274, illustrated by Pierre Girieud, Paris, éditions du Monde nouveau, 1922.
- L'Amateur de fantômes, Paris, Mercure de France, 1937.

== Bibliography ==
- « Gabriel Mourey », in Claude Schvalberg (direction), Dictionnaire de la critique d'art à Paris, 1890-1969, Rennes, Presses universitaires de Rennes, 2014, (pp. 266–267) ISBN 9782753534872.
