= René Le Roy =

French flautist and music educator (1898–1985)

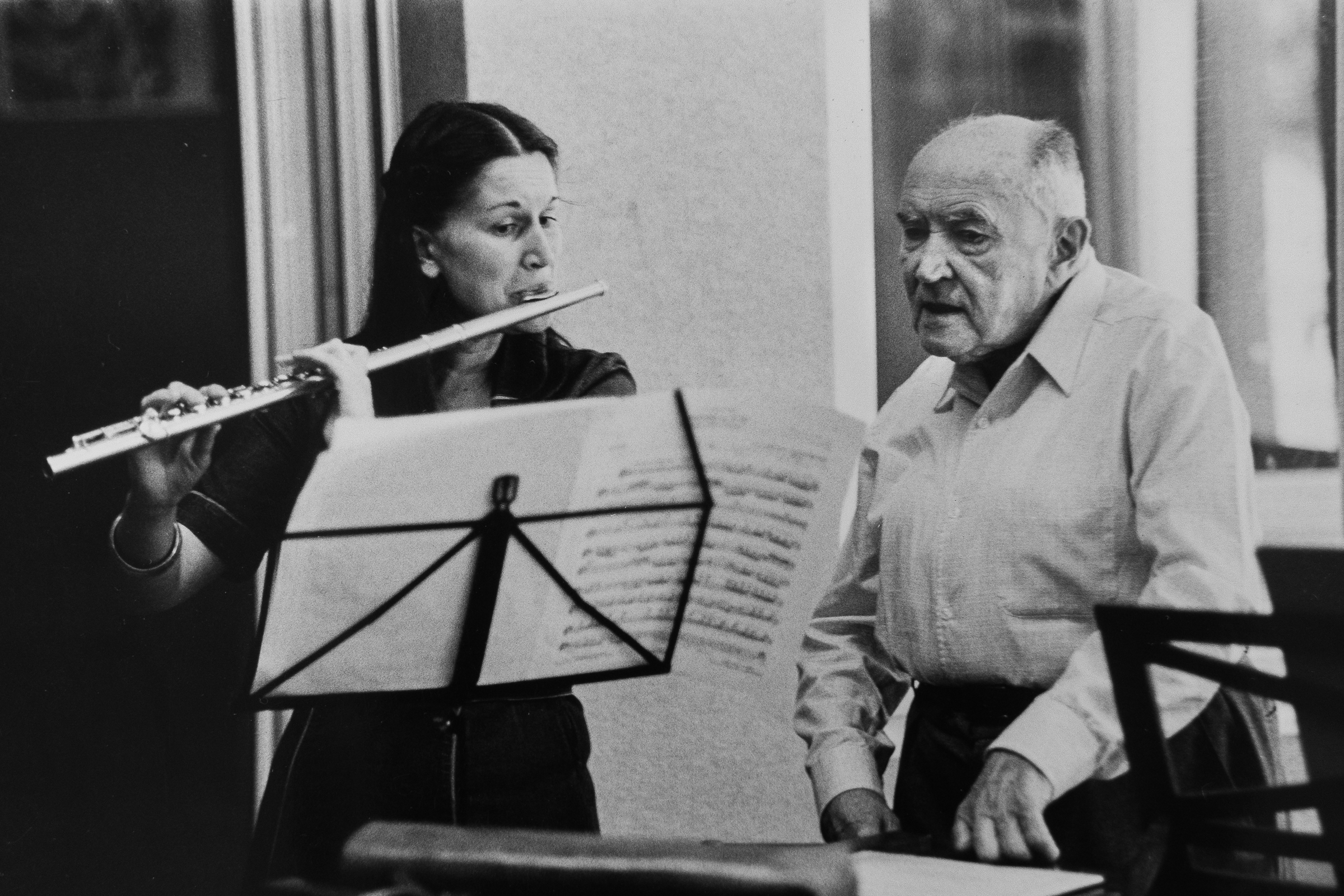
- René Le Roy masterclass at Puget-Théniers (1981)
- Born: 4 March 1898; Maisons-Laffitte
- Died: 3 January 1985 (aged 86); Paris
- Occupations: Flutist; Pedagogue

René Le Roy (French pronunciation: [ʁəne lə ʁwa]; 4 March 1898 – 3 January 1985) sometimes spelled René LeRoy, was a French 20th-century flutist and a pedagogue.

== Biography ==
René Le Roy was born in 1898 in Maisons-Laffitte. His parents were both amateur musicians, his father playing the flute and his mother the piano. It was his father who began his education as early as 1906. In 1916, he studied with Adolphe Hennebains, Léopold Lafleurance and Philippe Gaubert at the Conservatoire de Paris, where he graduated in 1918.

In 1922, he established the Quintette instrumental de Paris with flute, harp and string trio. Several composers wrote for the ensemble, including Albert Roussel (Sérénade pour flûte, harpe, violon, alto et violoncelle opus 30), Vincent d'Indy (suite, opus 91), Joseph Jongen and Cyril Scott.

From 1952 to 1968, René Le Roy was a solo flute at the New York City Opera Orchestra, and until 1971 he was a chamber music teacher at the Conservatoire de Paris. Among his students were Christine Alicot, Juho Alvas, Thomas Brown, Susan Morris DeJong, Geoffrey Gilbert and Bassam Saba.

== Publication ==
Traité de la flûte, historique, technique et pédagogique. (with Claude Dorgeuille), Paris, Éditions musicales transatlantiques, 1966. 103 p.
