= Sankyo Flute Company =

Sankyo Flute Manufacturing Co., Ltd, located in Sayama, Japan, produces handmade flutes, piccolos and head joints at the professional level. A number of prominent flautists, such as Walter Auer of the Vienna Philharmonic Orchestra, Julien Beaudiment of the Los Angeles Philharmonic Orchestra, John Curran of the Rhode Island Philharmonic Orchestra, and Young-ji Song of the Seoul Philharmonic Orchestra, play Sankyo flutes. (see website)

The Sankyo flute facility produces approximately 350 handmade silver, gold and wood instruments and many silver and gold headjoints every month for worldwide distribution. Sankyo Flutes are currently distributed in America through Sankyo Flutes US, a division of Flute Authority™.

== Flutes ==
=== Silver Flutes ===
- CF201 silver flute
- CF301 silver flute
- CF401 silver flute
- CF501 silver flute
- CF601 silver flute
- CF701 silver flute
- CF801 silver flute
- CF901 silver flute

=== Gold Flutes ===
- K5-4 DT 5-karat gold flute (no longer in production)
- K10-2 DT 10-karat gold flute
- K14-3 DT 14-karat gold flute
- K14-3 ST 14-karat gold flute
- K14-4 DT 14-karat gold flute
- K14-4 ST 14-karat gold flute
- K14-5 DT 14-karat gold flute
- K14-5 ST 14-karat gold flute
- K18-3 DT 18-karat gold flute
- K18-3 ST 18-karat gold flute
- K18-4 DT 18-karat gold flute
- K18-4 ST 18-karat gold flute
- K18-5 DT 18-karat gold flute
- K18-5 ST 18-karat gold flute
- K24 - 24-karat gold flute (with 14K or 18K mechanism)

=== Other Flutes ===
- Wood Flute
- Flûte d'amour
- Alto Flutes

== Artists ==
Flute players associated with the Sankyo brand are known as Sankyo artists. Current Sankyo artists include:

- Greg Patillo
- Ali Ryerson
- Peter Verhoyen
