= Gaston Blanquart =

French musicologist and flautist

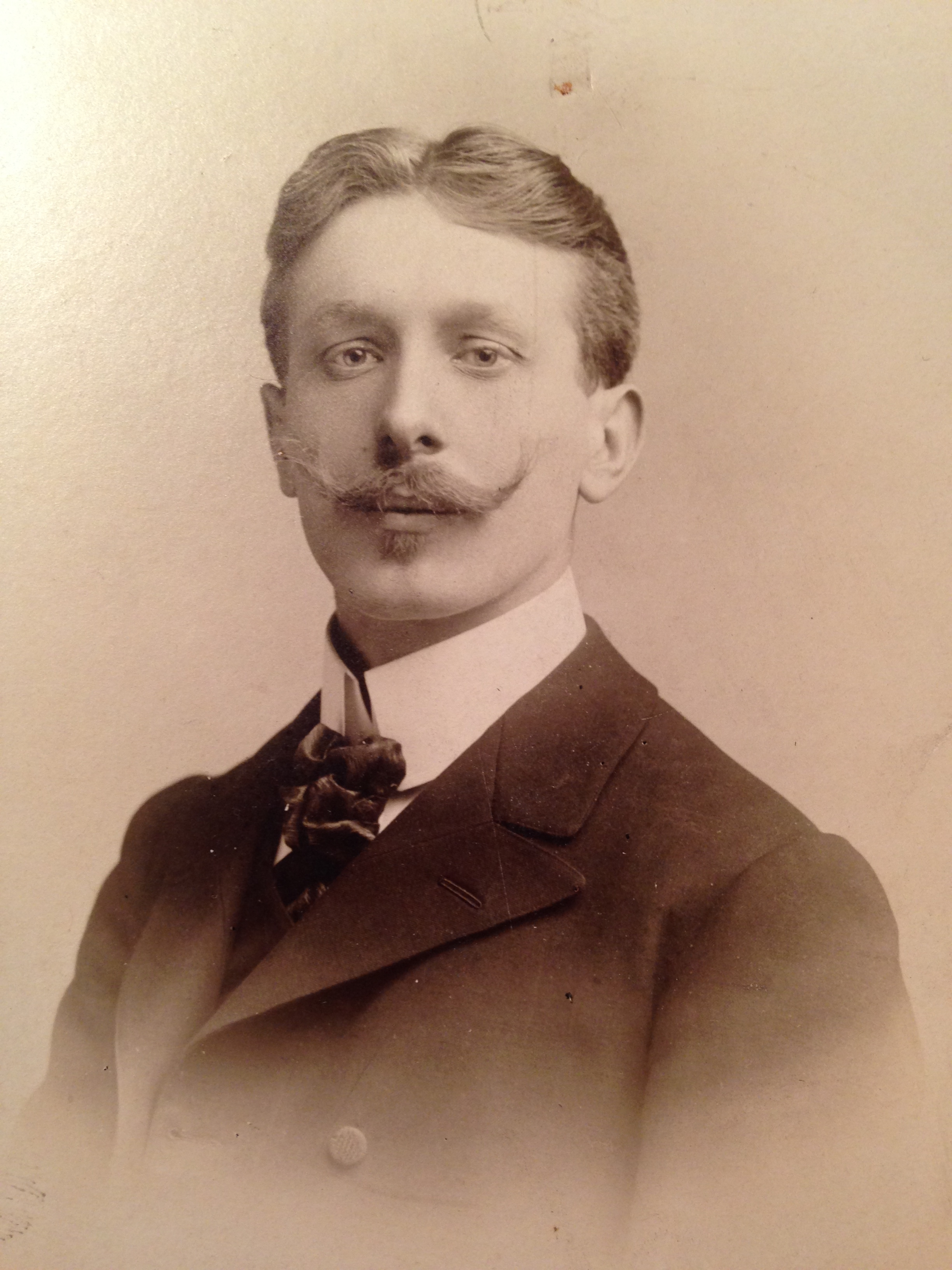
- Gaston Blanquart
- Born: 2 June 1877; Raismes (Nord)
- Died: 1 December 1962 (aged 85); Clichy
- Occupations: Flautist; Pedagogue
- Spouse: Fernande Dauphin

Gaston Blanquart (2 June 1877 – 1 December 1962) was a French classical flautist as well as a music pedagogue.

== Biography ==
Coming from a modest family, Gaston Blanquart began studying the flute at the École nationale de Valenciennes. In 1894 he succeeded in the competition of entrance to the Conservatoire de Paris. His teacher Paul Taffanel considered him a model pupil. On July 28, 1898, he went through a jury presided over by Theodore Dubois, including Gabriel Fauré, Gabriel Pierné and Charles-Marie Widor; he then won the First Prize with the famous Fantaisie (Op. 79) by Fauré composed for the occasion.

In 1900 he was hired by Édouard Colonne as fourth flute, and in 1905 became a solo flute of the Concerts Colonne, he held this post for 35 years. The creations in which Gaston Blanquart participated are numerous and of primary importance: Maurice Ravel: Une barque sur l'océan (1907) and the Rhapsodie espagnole (1908), Claude Debussy: Danses for harp (1904), Vincent D'Indy: Jour d'été à la montagne (1906) etc. The greatest soloists performed with the orchestra: Raoul Pugno, Pablo de Sarasate, Alfred Cortot, Pablo Casals, Jacques Thibaud. Occasional conductors were Arthur Nikisch, Richard Strauss, Claude Debussy, Gustav Mahler who directed his second symphony in 1910.

Very regularly Gaston Blanquart performed as a soloist. He met a huge success in the Prélude à l'après-midi d'un faune by Claude Debussy.

He married in 1900 with the cellist Fernande Dauphin. The couple had two children: Edmond and Marcelle future harpist, soloist of the Concerts Poulet and Concerts Colonne but also future mother of Arlette Sweetman.

Blanquart was friend of many great soloists and composers. French composer, Camille Saint-Saëns appreciated him very much, he was regarded the favorite flautist of Maurice Ravel and he very often played with partners such as Nadia Boulanger, Pablo Casals, Georges Enesco, Lily Laskine, Jacques Thibaud and many others.

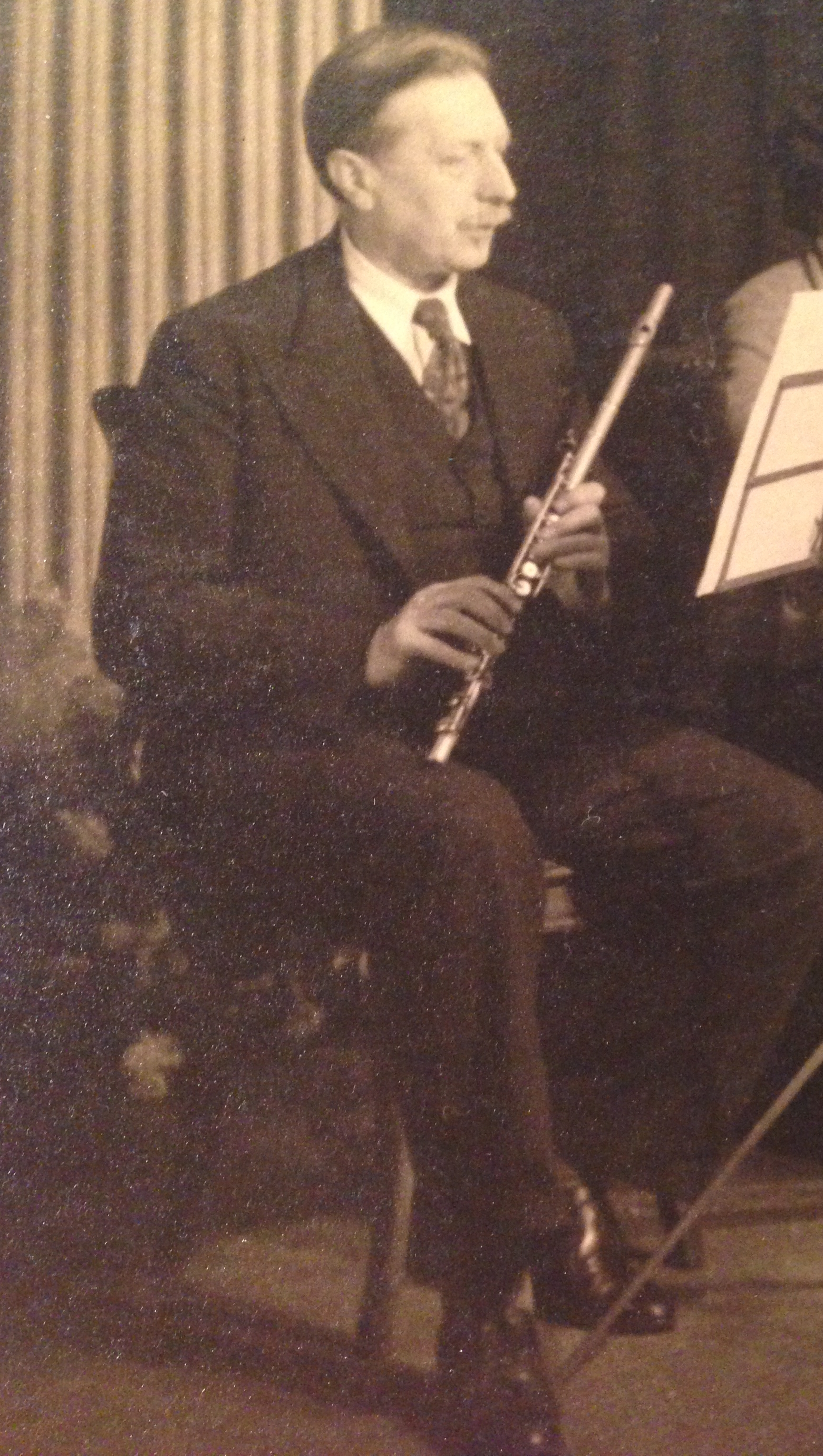

An orchestral musician closely associated with conductor Pierre Monteux, he performed with the Ballets Russes under Monteux's direction. His participation in key Igor Stravinsky premieres includes Petrushka (June 1911, Théâtre du Châtelet), The Rite of Spring (May 29, 1913, Théâtre des Champs-Élysées)—which provoked a notable public disturbance and subsequent cultural shift—and The Nightingale (May 1914). In 1923, he attained his long-term career objective with an appointment to the Opéra Orchestra.

In December 1927, he participated in the Salle Pleyel to the sole performance of Pierrot lunaire by Arnold Schönberg directed in France by the composer.

Gaston Blanquart had a passion for pedagogy and had many pupils throughout his life, both in private and at the Schola Cantorum de Paris and at the Institut Berlioz. He welcomed amateurs, including teachers Alexandre Minkowski and Louis Leprince-Ringuet. The atmosphere was special rue de Miromesnil: Father, mother and daughter gave all three lessons all day long.

At the time of retirement, the last show in which Gaston Blanquart participated was the Faust by Charles Gounod where the role of Marguerite was held by a twenty-five year young debutante: Victoria de Los Angeles.

In November 1953, he was promoted to the rank of Chevalier of the Legion d'honneur. Maurice Lehmann, director of the Opera, handed him his Cross.

All of his life he would help the most fragile. During the First World War he was taken prisoner at the very outset of hostilities and was interned at the Minden camp in Westphalia. He spent four years with twelve thousand other prisoners, and showed them an altruism uncommon in such circumstances. "It seemed that Gaston Blanquart imposed on all by his art, his calm reflection and also by a sort of kindness which was emanating from his personality. Unfortunately, there were not many men like him," wrote Maurice Carton, one of his companions in captivity.

Blanquart was very involved in associative life and social action, he helped young musicians as well as the elder ones. In November 1962 he suffered a malaise, he oscillated several days between life and death. He died in his sleep on 1 December 1962.
