= Saint-Amour, Jura =

Commune in Bourgogne-Franche-Comté, France

Saint-Amour
- Commune
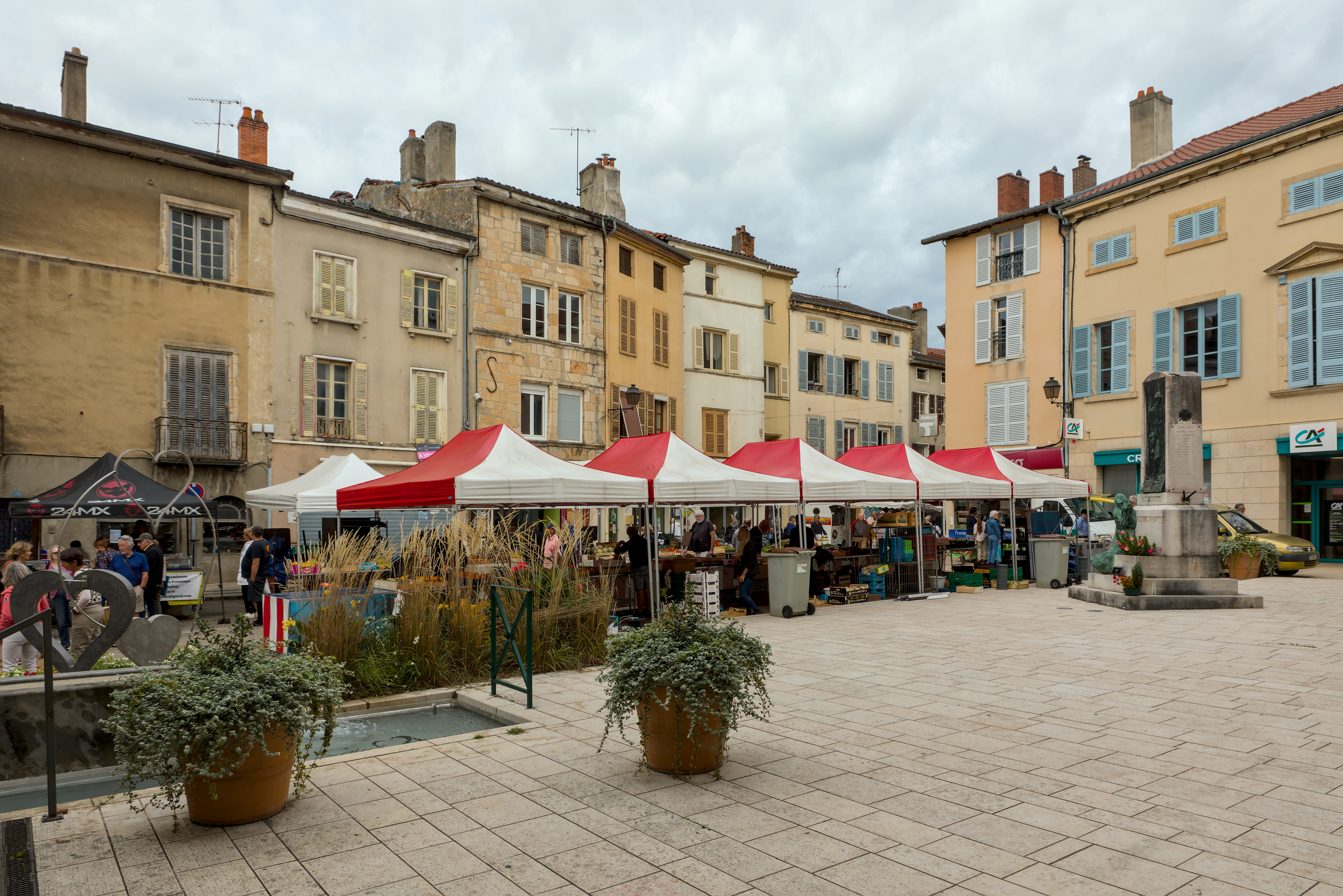
- Place d'Armes, at the center of the town

- Coat of arms
- Location of Saint-Amour
- Location within France Location within Bourgogne-Franche-Comté
- Coordinates: 46°26′11″N 5°20′38″E
- Country: France
- Region: Bourgogne-Franche-Comté
- Department: Jura
- Arrondissement: Lons-le-Saunier
- Canton: Saint-Amour

Government
  - Mayor (2020–2026): Valérie Vaucher
- Area^{1}: 11.65 km^{2} (4.50 sq mi)
- Highest elevation: 446 m (1,463 ft)
- Lowest elevation: 200 m (660 ft)
- Population (2023): 2,349
  - Density: 201.6/km^{2} (522.2/sq mi)
- Time zone: UTC+01:00 (CET)
  - Summer (DST): UTC+02:00 (CEST)
- INSEE/Postal code: 39475 /39160
- ^{1} French Land Register data, which excludes lakes, ponds, glaciers > 1 km^{2} (0.386 sq mi or 247 acres) and river estuaries.

Saint-Amour (French pronunciation: [sɛ̃.t‿amuʁ]) is a town and commune in the Jura department in the Bourgogne-Franche-Comté region in eastern France.

== Population ==
Historical population

Year	Pop.	±% p.a.
1793	2,878	—
1800	2,694	−0.94%
1806	2,638	−0.35%
1821	2,573	−0.17%
1831	2,595	+0.09%
1836	2,631	+0.28%
1841	2,527	−0.80%
1846	2,635	+0.84%
1851	2,284	−2.82%
1856	2,256	−0.25%
1861	2,343	+0.76%
1866	2,554	+1.74%
1872	2,419	−0.90%
1876	2,439	+0.21%
1881	2,437	−0.02%
1886	2,385	−0.43%
1891	2,267	−1.01%
1896	2,283	+0.14%
1901	2,109	−1.57%

Year	Pop.	±% p.a.
1906	2,145	+0.34%
1911	2,101	−0.41%
1921	1,862	−1.20%
1926	1,919	+0.60%
1931	1,939	+0.21%
1936	1,912	−0.28%
1946	2,034	+0.62%
1954	2,201	+0.99%
1962	2,221	+0.11%
1968	2,508	+2.05%
1975	2,566	+0.33%
1982	2,399	−0.96%
1990	2,200	−1.08%
1999	2,102	−0.51%
2007	2,247	+0.84%
2012	2,375	+1.11%
2017	2,378	+0.03%
2023	2,349	−0.20%

Source: EHESS and INSEE (1968-2023)

== See also ==
- Communes of the Jura department
