= Marcel Moyse =

French flautist (1889–1984)

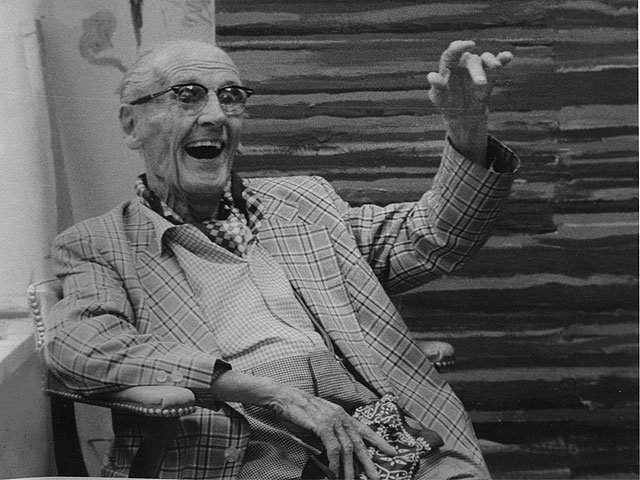

Background information
- Born: May 17, 1889; St. Amour, France
- Died: November 1, 1984 (aged 95) Brattleboro, Vermont
- Genre: Classical
- Occupations: Soloist, virtuoso, teacher
- Instrument: Flute

Marcel Moyse ([mɔiz]; May 17, 1889, in St. Amour, France – November 1, 1984, in Brattleboro, Vermont, United States) was a French flautist. Moyse studied at the Paris Conservatory and was a student of Philippe Gaubert, Adolphe Hennebains, and Paul Taffanel; all of whom were flute virtuosos in their time. Moyse played principal flute in various Paris orchestras and appeared widely as a soloist and made many recordings. His trademark tone was clear, flexible, penetrating, and controlled by a fast vibrato. This was a characteristic of the 'French style' of flute playing that was to influence the modern standard for flutists worldwide.

Moyse taught on the faculty of the Conservatoire de musique du Québec à Montréal, and was a founder of the Marlboro Music School and festival in Vermont. Moyse strove to teach his students "not how to play the flute, but to make music". Among his students were James Galway, Paula Robison, Trevor Wye, William Bennett, Carol Wincenc, Bernard Goldberg, Robert Aitken, Arthur Kitti, Karen Reynolds, September Payne and Julia Bogorad. Moyse authored many flute studies, including De la Sonorite and Tone Development Through Interpretation, published by McGinnis & Marx.

== Paris Conservatoire ==
Marcel Moyse moved to Paris in 1904 to live with his uncle, Joseph Moyse. By living with his uncle, Marcel observed firsthand the life of the average professional musician. Joseph played in the cello section of the Lamoureux Orchestra, or Concerts Lamoureux, a highly respected musical institution founded in 1881 by Charles Lamoureux. Marcel depended on his uncle to interpret Parisian life and to guide him in determining his place in it. Joseph established a plan for his nephew, designed to bring him socially and intellectually up to speed. In the first month, Marcel could do what he pleased: attend concerts, visit museums, stroll the streets. Marcel had told his uncle that he wanted to be a sculptor, so Joseph enrolled him in a drawing class at the Ecole Boule, however Joseph also intended to find him a flute teacher.

With the help of Alfred Moyse, Joseph purchased a new flute for Marcel and immediately assigned him several daily practice sessions of forty-five minutes each, interspersed with fifteen minutes of reading from his extensive personal library. Along with this extensive study on flute, Joseph took Marcel to rehearsals and concerts to give Marcel an insight into what was possible for the future. In May 1904, Joseph presented Marcel to Adolphe Hennebains. Hennebains remarked favorably on the boy's abilities and accepted him as a pupil, a decision that brought Marcel one giant step closer to the Conservatoire.

After just a few months of studying with Hennebains, Moyse made swift progress with him and was invited to audit Paul Taffanel's class at the Paris Conservatoire. Taffanel was looked upon highly and although by the time Moyse had him as a teacher, Taffanel was sixty and retired from playing, Moyse's time with Taffanel was invaluable. Moyse immediately grasped the standard repertoire required for admittance into the Conservatoire. Under the guidance of Hennebains and with the approval of Taffanel, Moyse auditioned for and won a place in the flute class at the Paris Conservatoire in the fall of 1905. In 1906 with only one year of Conservatoire training, Moyse performed the newly written exam piece, Nocturne et Allegro scherzando by Philippe Gaubert. If Moyse was nervous, he did not betray it in his performance, with the stretching melody of the nocturne and the skipping, whimsical turns of the scherzo were perfect vehicles for his expressive tone and nimble technique. At the age of seventeen, Moyse accepted the first prize and was deemed ready for a professional career.

Moyse had become one of a handful of flutists in the history of the Conservatoire to qualify for a first prize in one year, but his playing lacked polish, and he knew it. Soon after leaving the school he approached Hennebains for more lessons, but his former teacher turned him down, saying the eighteen-year-old was already an accomplished artist. So Moyse went to Philippe Gaubert, who then played with the Opéra and the Société des Concerts. Gaubert, who had been impressed by Moyse's performance of his concours solo, was pleased to accept him as a private student, every Friday at five o'clock in the evening. Moyse remained with Gaubert for about four years. "Gaubert was an instinctive musician," Moyse recalled. "He played as naturally as someone walks, stepping out with his left foot, then his right, avoiding all obstacles. The musical instinct of Gaubert was like an instinct of the body--music without thinking about it."

== Career ==
Diligent practice, additional study, and a growing number of performing opportunities in the 1906-07 season absorbed Moyse completely. After having studied in Lucien Capet's chamber music class, he continued independently to work through the repertoire for solo violin and eventually added cello literature to his practice sessions, "to try to develop a rich sound, as my uncle had on his cello."

In 1913, Moyse toured the United States with operatic soprano Nellie Melba in her private train. Soon after, World War I arrived and Moyse was rejected by the army because of recurring pneumonia. This was a very difficult time in his life, particularly as Moyse was slowly trying to rebuild his health.

From the years 1916 to 1918, Nadia Boulanger invited Moyse to play at her classes on musical analysis. Moyse was principal flute soloist in Paris's Opéra Comique and simultaneously, in order to prove himself, applied for the solo flute position at the Paris Opera. Although offered the position, he turned it down as it would interfere with his frequent visits home to St. Amour. Moyse's career continued to flourish, and he became the first flutist with the orchestra of the Orchestre de la Société des Concerts du Conservatoire.

In 1931, Moyse was teaching in Geneva when the flutist of the Orchestre de la Suisse Romande, Marcel Welsch, committed suicide. Welsch was scheduled to play Bach's Brandenburg Concerto No. 5 with the orchestra; it was Blanche Honegger who suggested Moyse as a replacement. This was the beginning of the famous Moyse Trio: Marcel - the founder and director - playing flute; Blanche, playing violin and viola; and his son Louis, playing both flute and piano. From its conception in 1934, the Moyse Trio performed and recorded for the next 20 years.

In 1932, Moyse succeeded Philippe Gaubert as Professor at the Paris Conservatoire and in addition, was appointed Professor at the Geneva Conservatoire from 1933 to 1949, which entailed a weekly trip to Geneva. Geneva being fairly close to St. Amour, meant more frequent visits to the village where he was born and which he loved. He never failed to visit his adoptive mother when he passed by St. Amour.

By 1936, he was on top of the world. He became a Chevalier of the Legion of Honour for his artistic contributions as a musician, and he traveled widely, performing in most of the major European cities, which included several performances and recordings in London. In 1938, he was invited to play at the Tanglewood Festival held in the United States for two weeks; both Blanche and Louis went with him as the Trio also had been invited by Arturo Toscanini to play on the NBC Radio in New York.

== Death and legacy ==
In his later years when he was barely able to play the flute himself he travelled each year to his birthplace St. Amour together with a handful of his students. They stayed at the Hotel du Commerce where Moyse gave them flute lessons. Today the square in front of the hotel is called Place Marcel Moyse.

In Moyse's last years, he was troubled by various medical problems which necessitated many operations and hospitalizations. Marcel Moyse died on November 1, 1984, at the age of 95, and was cremated in Brattleboro, Vermont. His ashes were buried in the cemetery of St. Amour Church in Jura, France, in August 1985.

The end of his life marked the close of an era. Generations of both distinguished and less distinguished flute players have been profoundly influenced by his playing and his teaching. There were several tributes to Moyse in remembrance, notably the memorial concert held at the Queen Elizabeth Hall in London on January 6, 1985, and shortly after a concert "In Memory of Marcel Moyse" held in Brattleboro, Vermont on February 3, 1985. On Moyse's centenary in 1989, there was the "Marcel Moyse Centennial Celebration" which took place from the 17th-20th of the May in Marlboro and Brattleboro, Vermont. At the same time, a "Flute Celebration" was presented in London which paid tribute to the great flutist and teacher on his birth date, May 17. There were many memorials and remembrances to Moyse in the world's flute press, and a flourishing Marcel Moyse Society was formed in the U.S.A.

== Publications ==
- Études et exercices techniques (1921)
- Exercices journaliers (1922)
- 24 Études de virtuosité d'après Czerny (1927)
- Mécanisme-chromatisme pour flûte (1927); Éditions Alphonse Leduc
- École de l'articulation (1927); Éditions Alphonse Leduc
- 25 Études mélodiques (Var) (1928)
- 12 Études de grande virtuosité d'après Chopin (1928); Éditions Alphonse Leduc
- 20 Études d'après Kreutzer (1928)
- 100 Études faciles et progressives d'après Cramer (1928); 2 volumes
- 24 Petites études mélodiques (Var) (1928)
- 48 Études de virtuosité ; 1er cahier; Éditions Alphonse Leduc (1933)
- 48 Études de virtuosité ; 2e cahier; Éditions Alphonse Leduc (1935)
- De la Sonorité (1934)
- 25 Études journaliers (Op-53) Soussman
- Gammes et Arpèges (Scales and Arpeggios); Éditions Alphonse Leduc
- Le Débutant flûtiste (1935)
- 24 Caprices-études : Boehm Op. 26 (1938)
- Tone Development Through Interpretation
- 20 Exercices et études sur les Grandes Liaisons

== Recordings ==
From Orchestral Suite No. 2, BWV 1067, performed by Marcel Moyse (flute) with The Adolf Busch Chamber Players conducted by Adolf Busch (1930s monaural recording)
Movements 4 (Bourrée I/II) and 5 (Polonaise)

Movements 6 (Minuet) and 7 (Badinerie)

- The Complete Works of the Great Flutist – a five CD box set of restored and remastered recordings including his own and Andersen studies, flute solos and chamber music. Note this is not definitive
- Flute Fantastique

1. Fantasie brillante for Flute and Piano on Bizet's Carmen
2. Carnival of the Animals: The swan
3. Mélodie for Flute and Piano
4. Madrigal for Flute and Piano
5. Souvenir de Gand
6. Fantasie Mélancolique, Op. 1
7. Suite for Orchestra No. 2 in B minor, BWV 1067: Polonaise
8. Suite for Orchestra No. 2 in B minor, BWV 1067: Badinerie
9. Andante pastorale et Scherzettino
10. Syrinx
11. Andante pastorale et Scherzettino
12. Fantasie pastorale hongroise for Flute and Piano, Op. 26
13. L'arlésienne: Suite No. 1: 2nd movement, Menuet
14. Variations de concert sur le Carnaval de Venise
15. Orfeo ed Euridice: Les Champs-Elysées
16. By the Brook
17. Quartet for Strings No. 1 in D major, Op. 11: 2nd movement, Andante cantabile
18. Fantaisie for Flute and Piano

- Marcel Plays Mozart – Flute and Harp Concerto, Concerto's in D and G, and JS Bach's Flute Piano and Violin Sonata
- Marcel Moyse and Marlboro Alumni – Very Rare CD in which Moyse Conducts Mozarts Seranade No. 10 in Bflat (Grand Partita) for 13 winds.

== See also ==
- Louis Moyse

== Archives ==
- The Marcel Moyse Papers are housed in the Music Division of The New York Public Library for the Performing Arts in New York City. The collection includes: rare photographs; letters to Moyse from well-known musicians such as Gaubert, Ibert, Rampal; manuscripts of unpublished study books; audio and videotapes of lessons and master classes.
