= Paul Taffanel =

French flautist, conductor and instructor

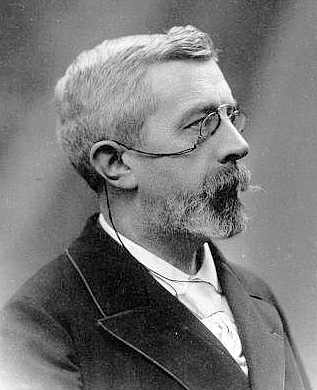
Paul Taffanel

Claude-Paul Taffanel (16 September 1844 – 22 November 1908) was a French flautist, conductor and instructor, regarded as the founder of the French Flute School that dominated much of flute composition and performance during the mid-20th century.

== Early years ==
Born in Bordeaux, Taffanel received his first lessons on the flute from his father at the age of nine. After giving his first concert at the age of ten, he studied with Vincent Dorus at the Paris Conservatoire. Once he graduated in 1860, he won his first of several awards for flute performance at age sixteen. Taffanel built a substantial career as both soloist and orchestral player over 30 years, becoming known as the foremost flautist of his time and reestablishing the instrument in the mainstream of music.

== Professorship ==
In 1893, Taffanel became Professor of Flute at the Conservatoire. As Professor, he revised the institute's repertoire and teaching methods, restructuring the traditional masterclass format to give students individual attention while building a reputation as an inspiring teacher. He instructed his students to play in a new, smoother style that included a light and carefully modulated vibrato.

== Reviving early music ==
Taffanel also revamped the required repertoire for his Conservatory students. Beginning in 1894, he replaced much of the 19th-century music his student Louis Fleury called "idle twittering" with works by Johann Sebastian Bach and other composers of the 18th century. Until then, French musicians (save for a handful of organists) had ignored the Bach revival that had swept England, Germany and Austria. Alfredo Casella, who had studied Bach in Italy before coming to Paris, noted that none of his classmates at the Conservatoire knew that composer's music.

Taffanel toured widely in Europe. This placed him ahead of his contemporaries in awareness of baroque repertoire (his tours had included playing Mozart concertos at the Gewandhaus in Leipzig, a singular honour for a French performer). Thanks to this awareness, Taffanel's impact on the early music revival in France cannot be overestimated. Louis Fleury wrote:

Bach's sonatas, those wonders, long buried in the dust of libraries, awakened to find a real interpreter [in Taffanel]. He was the first, at any rate in France, to find out the meaning of these works, which his colleagues thought dull and badly written for the instrument ... It is a fact, though hardly credible, that down to 1895 Bach sonatas were not taught in the flute class (under Altes) at the conservatoire.

His work sparked and helped fuel a growing interest in France in early music, with editions such as Saint-Saëns' of music by Jean-Philippe Rameau. In 1897, Taffanel also became head of the orchestra class at the Conservatoire.

== Conductor ==
In addition to his teaching duties, Taffanel became an important opera and orchestra conductor, serving from 1890 to 1906 as chief conductor at both the Paris Opéra and the Société des Concerts du Conservatoire. Previously these positions had been awarded to string players; Taffanel was the first flautist to hold them. Taffanel's duties at the Opéra included directing all new productions, among which during his tenure were French premieres of various Wagner operas and Verdi's Otello. At the Société des Concerts, Taffanel championed Camille Saint-Saëns and other contemporary French composers. He also gave the world premiere of Verdi's Quattro pezzi sacri. He revised the Conservatory's repertoire and teaching methods, putting the music of other, foreign composers, including Bach, back into the institute's repertoire.

== Chamber musician ==
Chamber music did not escape Taffanel's attention. Founding the Société de musique de chambre pour instruments à vent (Society of Chamber Music for Wind Instruments) in 1879, he revived the wind ensemble music of Mozart and Beethoven while also encouraging the composition of many new works, including Charles Gounod's Petite symphonie. In addition, during the 1880s, Taffanel participated in "historic" concerts, playing his Boehm flute alongside viola da gamba and harpsichord in performances of baroque music.

== Composer and writer ==
Andante Pastoral et Scherzettino
Performed by Alex Murray (flute) and Martha Goldstein (piano)

Wind Quintet in G minor
1. Allegro con moto

2. Andante

3. Vivace
Performed by the Soni Ventorum Wind Quintet

Taffanel was also a fluent composer for the flute and wind quintet, writing several pieces considered part of the standard flute repertoire today. These include:

- Andante Pastoral et Scherzettino
- Grande Fantaisie sur Mignon
- Fantaisie sur thèmes du Freischütz
- Quintet in G minor (for woodwind quintet) (1876)

He also began writing a method book for flute, 17 Grands exercices journaliers de mécanisme, which was finished after his death by two of his students, Louis Fleury and Philippe Gaubert. Today, this is considered a standard method book for flute players to study from. Gaubert became the second most recognized French flautist and composer (after Taffanel).

== Death ==
Taffanel suffered from a physical breakdown in 1901, and died in Paris in 1908, aged 64.

== Playing style ==
Taffanel came at a crucial moment in the flute's history, after Theobald Boehm had completely remodeled the instrument. He proved the flute fully capable of elegance and extreme expressiveness. At the same time, the credo later advocated by the French Flute School that tone quality was more important than loudness did not always hold true for him. His low register was often described as "powerful and brassy", "ample" or "full". This may have been due in part to Parisian audiences of the period. They expected the flute, along with all the woodwinds, to play with assertiveness. When Hans von Bülow conducted the Berlin Philharmonic in Paris, critics and audiences alike criticized the tone of the wind instruments as being too small.

Georges Barrère recalled in 1921 that quality and quantity of tone as well as fine technique were not all that set Taffanel's playing apart. Fleury added:

Elegance, flexibility, and sensitivity were the hallmarks of Taffanel's artistry, and his phenomenal virtuosity was made as inconspicuous as possible. He hated affectation, believing that the text of the music should be respected absolutely, and beneath the supple fluency of his playing there was a rigorous adherence to accuracy of pulse and rhythm.

"Rigorous adherence" is a relative term here. By the standards of his time, Taffanel's pulse and rhythm were free from exaggeration. As rhythmic interpretation became more literal in 20th century practice, recordings of Taffanel's contemporaries came to sound relatively free and loose.

Another aspect of flute playing which Taffanel changed was his use of vibrato, which differed markedly from the standards later developed by the French Flute School. The Taffanel-Gaubert Méthode discouraged vibrato, especially in playing early music. Taffanel himself, however, employed "a light, almost imperceptible vibrato", according to Fleury. Another pupil, Adolphe Hennebains, went into more detail:

When he spoke to us of notes with vibrato or expression, he told us with a mysterious air that these notes, forte or piano, seemed to come from within himself. One had the impression that they came directly from the heart or soul.

== Works dedicated to Taffanel ==
Gabriel Fauré's Fantasie and Charles-Marie Widor's Suite, Op. 34 were both dedicated to Taffanel, and Pyotr Ilyich Tchaikovsky intended to write him a flute concerto shortly before his death. Also the Romanian composer George Enescu dedicated his Cantabile and Presto to Taffanel.

Preceded by Jules Garcin	Principal conductors, Orchestre de la Société des Concerts du Conservatoire; 1892–1901	Succeeded by Georges Marty
