= Philippe Gaubert =

French musician (1879–1941)

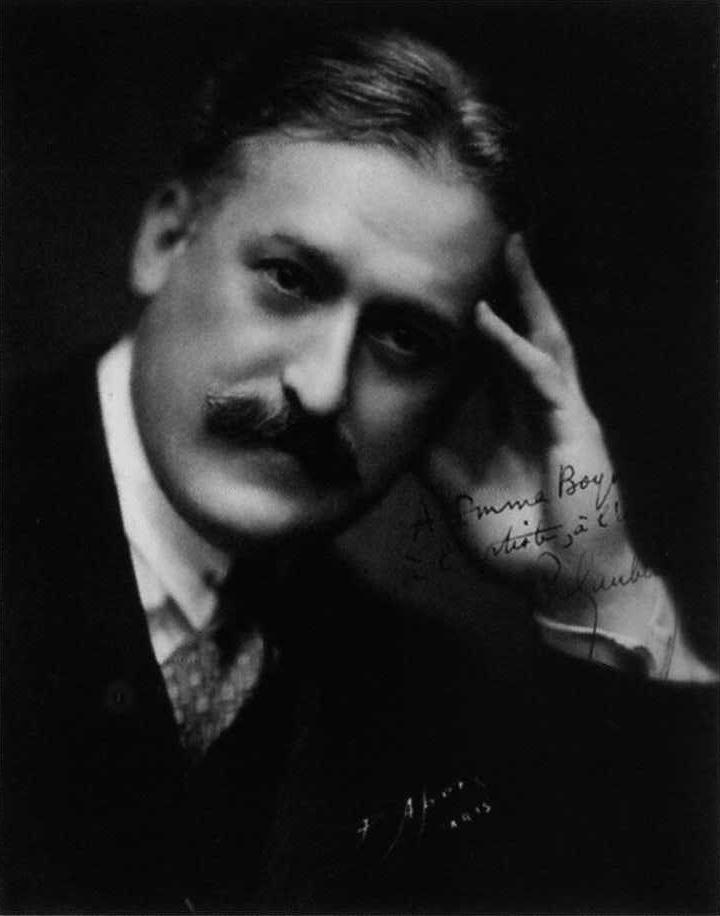
Philippe Gaubert (c. 1920)

Philippe Gaubert (5 July 1879 – 8 July 1941) was a French musician who was a distinguished performer on the flute. He was a respected conductor and a composer, primarily for the flute.

== Biography ==
Gaubert – commonly referred to as Gauberto – was born in Cahors but moved to Paris with his parents when he was six. His mother, who worked as a housekeeper, occasionally cleaned the apartment of Paul Taffanel, who began teaching Philippe the flute. Taffanel was Professor of Flute at the Paris Conservatoire, and Gaubert began studying there in 1893, aged 13.

He became one of the most prominent French musicians between the two World Wars. After a prominent career as a flautist with the Paris Opéra, he was appointed in 1919, at the age of forty, to three positions that placed him at the very centre of French musical life:

- Professor of flute in the Conservatoire de Paris (teacher of Marcel Moyse)
- Principal conductor of the Paris Opéra
- Principal conductor of the Orchestre de la Société des Concerts du Conservatoire

In 1907, he participated in the first performance of Maurice Ravel's Introduction and Allegro for harp, flute, clarinet and string quartet. Among his recordings as conductor, one that he made of César Franck's Symphony in D minor (with the Conservatoire forces) is particularly notable.

In 1941, Gaubert died of a stroke in Paris.

== Legacy ==
- Gaubert's playing can be heard on a series of recordings for the French Gramophone Company in 1919.
- His Méthode complète for flute, a collaboration with Taffanel, was published in 1923.
- Journalist Jean Bouzerand, Gaubert's friend, convinced the town of Cahors to create a public garden in Gaubert's honour near the river Lot in the late 1930s.
- When Gaubert was still alive, Albert Roussel dedicated the movement "Monsieur de la Péjaudie" in his piece Joueurs de flûte, op. 27 for flute and piano to him.

== Honours ==
Gaubert was appointed Chevalier de la Legion d'honneur in 1921.

== Selected works ==
Chamber music

- 3 Aquarelles, for flute, cello and piano
- Ballade, for flute and piano
- Ballade for viola and piano (1938)
- Berceuse, for flute and piano
- Cantabile et scherzetto, for cornet and piano (1909)
- Concert in F, for orchestra (1932)
- Divertissement Grec, for 2 flutes and harp
- 2 Esquisses, for flute and piano
- Fantaisie for clarinet & piano in F major
- Fantaisie for flute and piano in G minor
- Gavotte en rondeau (after Lully's Les Ballets du roi), for flute and piano
- Les Chants de la mer, for orchestra (1929)
- Madrigal, for flute and piano
- Morceau symphonique, for trombone and piano
- Médailles antiques, for flute, violin and piano
- Nocturne et allegro scherzando, for flute and piano
- Pièce romantique, for flute, cello, and piano
- Romance, for flute and piano (1905)
- Romance, for flute and piano (1908)
- Sicilienne, for flute and piano
- Sonata for Flute and Piano No. 1 in A major
- Sonata for Flute and Piano No. 2 in C major
- Sonata for Flute and Piano No. 3 in G major
- Sonatine, for flute and piano
- Suite, for flute and piano
- Sur l'eau, for flute and piano
- Symphony in F major, for orchestra (1936)
- Tarantelle, for flute, oboe and piano

Vocal

- Soir paien, for voice, flute and piano
- Vocalise en forme de barcarolle, for voice and piano

== Media ==
Nocturne and Allegro
Performed by Alex Murray (flute) and Martha Goldstein (piano)

Cultural offices
Preceded by André Messager	Principal conductor, Orchestre de la Société des Concerts du Conservatoire; 1919–1938	Succeeded by Charles Münch
