= Bayeux (disambiguation) =

Bayeux may refer to:

== Places ==
- Bayeux, a commune in the Calvados department in Normandy in northwestern France.
- Bayeux, Brazil, a municipality in Paraíba state in northeastern Brazil.

== Others ==
- Bayeux (river)
- Bayeux Tapestry
  - Bayeux Tapestry tituli
- The Bayeux speeches
- Jardin botanique de Bayeux

== See also ==
- Roman Catholic Diocese of Bayeux
- Canton of Bayeux
- Gare de Bayeux
- Arrondissement of Bayeux
- Bayeux Cathedral
- Thomas of Bayeux
- Poppa of Bayeux
- Odo of Bayeux
- Bayeux Commonwealth War Graves Commission Cemetery
- Pointe Bayeux
- Osbert de Bayeux
- Exuperius of Bayeux
- John de Bayeux
