= Ernest Eugène Altès =

French violinist and conductor

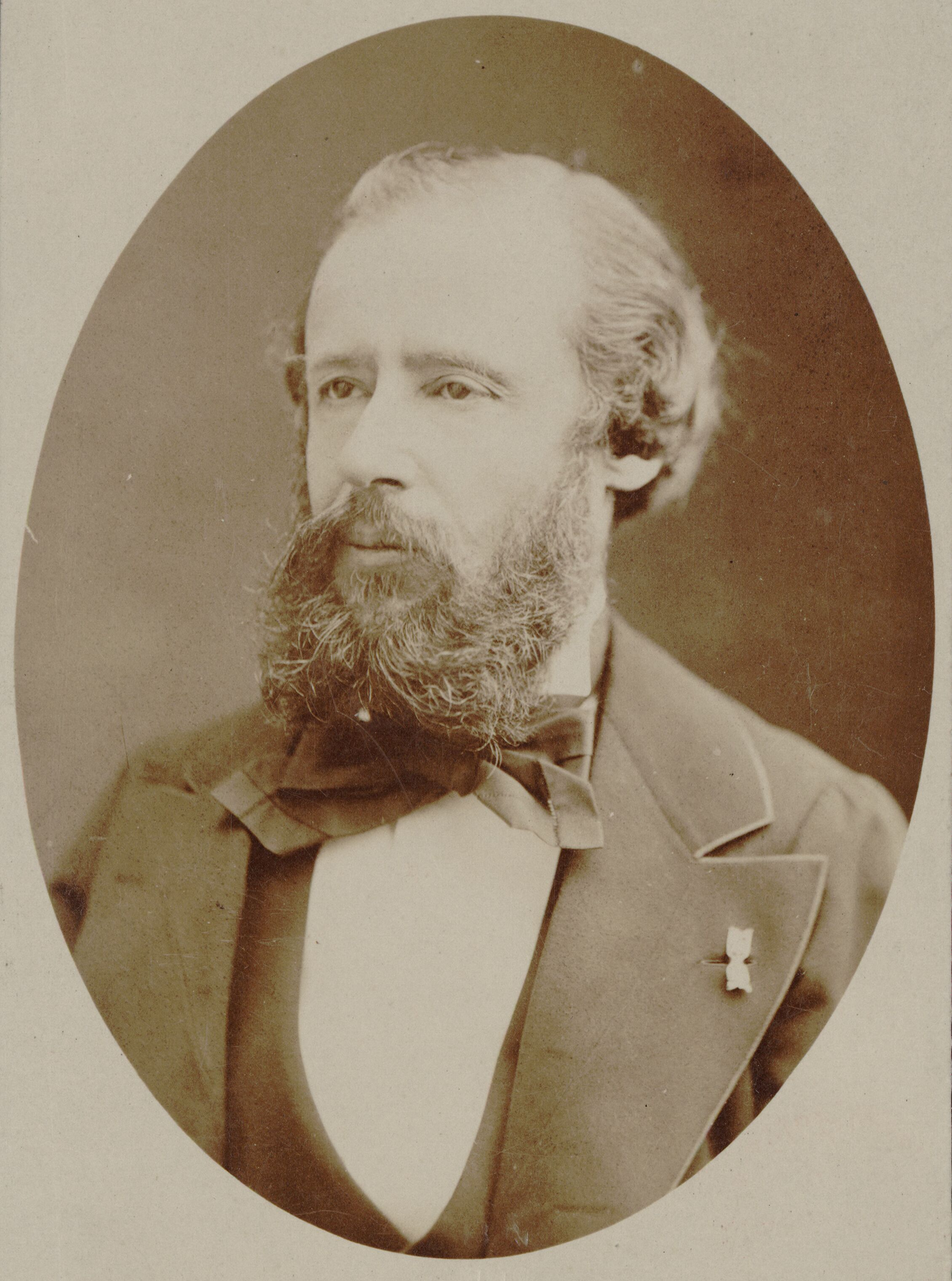
Ernest Eugène Altès, photographed by Pierre Petit

Ernest Eugène Altès (March 28, 1830 – July 8, 1899) was a French violinist and conductor.

== Life ==
He was born in Paris, the younger brother of the flute-player Joseph-Henri Altès. Sons of a soldier and brought up in the regiment, the boys were taught by their father to play the violin and fife from their earliest years. At age 12, Altès wrote an air with variations for violin and piano, which was shown to François Habeneck, and procured his entrance into the Paris Conservatory. In 1843 he entered Habeneck's violin class; two years later he gained a second accessit for violin, in 1847 the second prize, and in the following year the first prize. In 1849 he obtained a second prize for harmony under François Bazin, after which he spent some time in studying advanced composition with Michele Carafa. From 1845 onwards he played in the Paris Opera band, and in 1846 was admitted to the Orchestre de la Société des Concerts du Conservatoire.

In 1871 Altès was appointed deputy conductor at the Opera in place of Édouard Deldevez, who had just given up his post after twelve years' work. François George-Hainl was at this time conductor of the Opera, but at his death in 1873 Deldevez, who in the preceding year replaced Hainl as conductor at the Conservatory, was recalled. In 1877 Deldevez was succeeded at the opera by Charles Lamoureux, who being unable to agree with the new director, Auguste Vaucorbeil, retired at the end of 1879. Altès, who was still deputy conductor, was now appointed conductor, and almost immediately gave up his post at the Société des Concerts, which he had held since 1877. In 1881 he was decorated with the Légion d'Honneur. On July 1, 1887, M. Altès, having, against his wish, been placed on the retired list, was rather roughly discharged by the directors of the Opera, and replaced by Auguste Vianesi.

== Compositions ==
His chief compositions are a sonata for piano and violin, a trio for piano and strings, a string quartet, a symphony, and a divertissement on ballet airs by Daniel Auber, written for the Auber centenary in 1882, besides operatic fantasias, mélodies caractéristiques, etc.
