= Altès (surname) =

Altès or Altés is a surname. Notable people with the surname include:

- Carlos Altés (1907–?), Spanish footballer
- Ernest Eugène Altès (1830–1899), French violinist and conductor, brother of Joseph-Henri
- Joseph-Henri Altès (1826–1895), French flautist and composer
- Laia Palau Altés (born 1979), Spanish professional basketball player

== See also ==
- Antes (name)
