= Auguste Vaucorbeil =

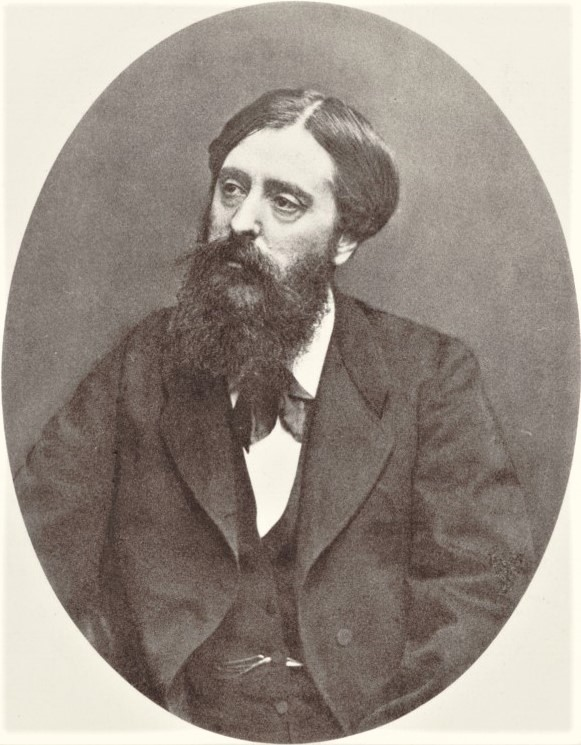
- Born: Auguste Emmanuel Veaucorbeille; 15 December 1821; Rouen, France
- Died: 2 November 1884 (aged 62); Paris, France
- Occupations: composer; theatre manager

Auguste Emmanuel Vaucorbeil, born Veaucorbeille, (15 December 1821 – 2 November 1884) was a French composer and theatre manager. He was the director of the Paris Opera from 1879 until his death at the age of 62. Vaucorbeil was born in Rouen and studied at the Paris Conservatoire. As a composer, he was best known for his art songs, but he also composed chamber music and two operas.

== Life and career ==
Vaucorbeil was born in Rouen, the son of a popular actor at the Théâtre du Gymnase who performed under the stage name "Ferville". With financial assistance from Queen Marie Amelie, he entered the Paris Conservatoire in 1835 and studied there for seven years. After leaving the conservatory, he initially earned a living by giving singing lessons and composing art songs. During this period he also composed chamber music, piano suites, a three-act opéra comique, La Bataille d' amour, and an ambitious cantata, La Mort de Diane. Finding it difficult to earn a living solely as a composer, in 1872 Vaucorbeil took a post in the French government department dealing with state-subsidised theatres. In 1878 he was given the title Inspecteur des Beaux-Arts (Inspector of Fine Arts), and the following year was appointed Director of the Opéra de Paris.

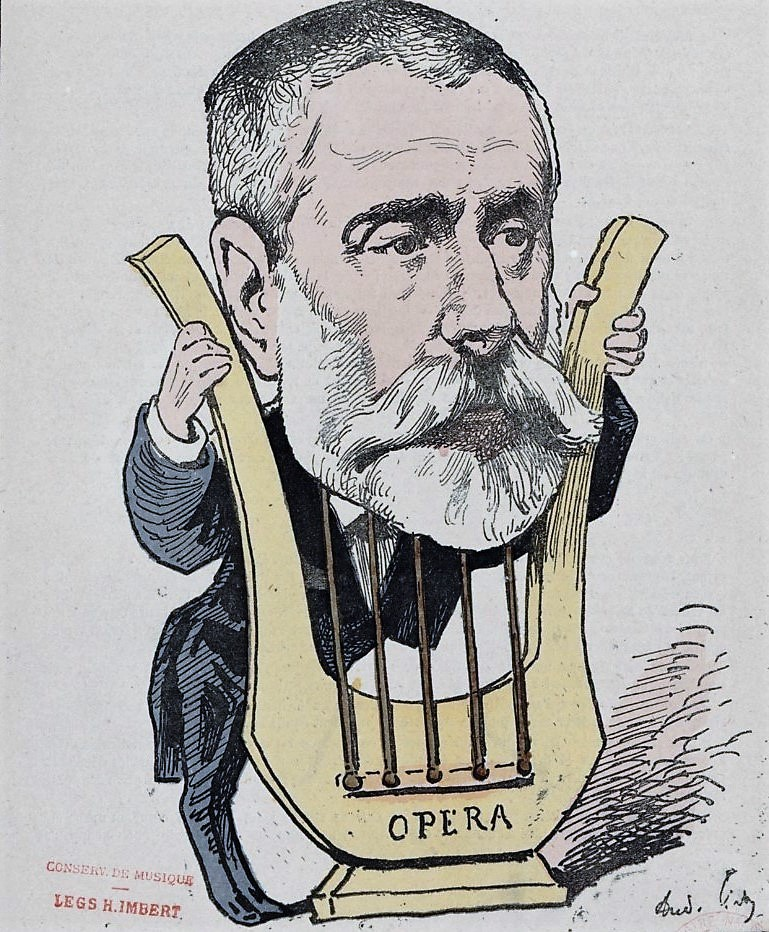
Caricature of Vaucorbeil by André Gill, 1879

According to Michael Georg Conrad, Vaucorbeil's appointment to the Opéra was initially viewed with optimism. It was the first time the company would be run by a trained musician since the days of François Habeneck who had left the Director's post in 1824. Long a champion of French baroque opera and ballet, in an 1877 memo to the French Assemblée nationale Vaucorbeil had lamented the failure of French opera houses to stage these works in the 19th century. In 1880 he instituted a concert series of these works at the Opéra, although financial constraints meant that fully staged productions proved impossible. Vaucorbeil's tenure was at times a stormy one. The Opéra's principal conductor Charles Lamoureux resigned six months into Vaucorbeil's directorship after a quarrel over the company's repertoire. When Massenet presented him with his newly composed opera Hérodiade in 1881, Vaucorbeil rejected its production at the Opéra because he found the libretto incoherent. Hérodiade premiered to great success at La Monnaie in Brussels instead. Further friction was caused by Vaucorbeil's policy of reducing expenses by casting young prize-winners from the Paris Conservatoire instead of established stars, a practice which was not viewed favourably by the composers of the operas he produced there.

Vaucorbeil was constantly under pressure to produce new works each season and at the same time keep the state-subsidised company's expenditure down. Writing in 1881, Conrad defended what he called Vaucorbeil's occasionally brusque and authoritarian manner, attributing it to the anxiety caused by the heavy responsibilities he faced. They would eventually wear him down and ruin his health. Vaucorbeil died in 1884 at the age of 62 after suffering for two weeks from what was described in Le Figaro as a serious and agonizing intestinal illness. His funeral was held at the Église Saint-Philippe-du-Roule in Paris. The Opéra de Paris chorus and orchestra conducted by Ernest Altès performed the Mozart Requiem, the Funeral March from Beethoven's Eroica, and the "Qui tollis" from Rossini's Petite messe solennelle sung by Gabrielle Krauss and Renée Richard. The funeral cortège then made its way to Montmartre Cemetery where Vaucorbeil was buried in the family tomb. His widow, Anna Sternberg Vaucorbeil (1845–1898), had been a prominent singer at La Monnaie and briefly appeared at the Paris Opera. She retired from the stage after her marriage to Vaucorbeil in 1874.

The day after his death, Auguste Vitu wrote a lengthy account in Le Figaro of Vaucorbeil's life and the successes and failures he encountered in his management of the Opéra. He began the piece by writing that the Opéra would kill others too, equally intelligent and as confident as Vaucorbeil had been when he first took over its management. At the end, he wrote:

Vaucorbeil, the honest man in all senses of the word. That is to say, a loyal, affable, and kind man, who did not know how to fight back and who when forced to refuse the impossible, grieved at the refusal as if he had suffered it himself. This sensitivity made him share the sorrows of others in his most intimate being as if they were his own. It consumed him, slowly at first, and then like an explosion.

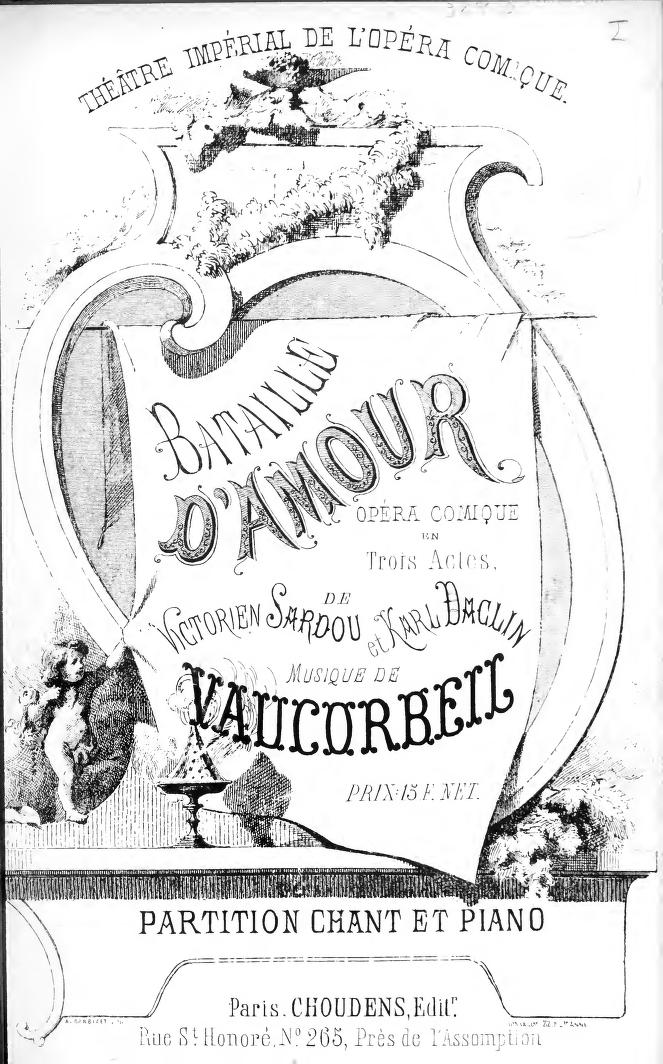
Voice and piano score for Vaucorbeil's opera Bataille d'amour

== Compositions ==
As a composer, Vaucorbeil was best known for his art songs, many of them set to texts by prominent poets of the day and initially appearing individually in the periodical Le Ménestrel. A complete collection of his songs was published by Heugel in 1860. Heugel also published some of Vaucorbeil's chamber music—three sonatas for piano and violin and String Quartet No. 1 dedicated to Joseph d'Ortigue who was a great admirer of Vaucorbeil's work. His Intimités (6 pieces for solo piano) was published by Durand and his string quintet based on Norwegian melodies was published by Richault. He also composed several pieces of vocal religious music which were published by La Maîtrise in 1860, including Cantique des Trois Enfants to a text by Corneille and a Kyrie for three voices.

Vaucorbeil composed three dramatic works:

- Bataille d'amour, an opéra comique in three acts set to a libretto by Victorien Sardou and Karl Daclin. It premiered on 13 April 1863 at the Opéra-Comique (Salle Favart) in Paris.
- La Mort de Diane, a large-scale cantata for chorus and soprano, set to a libretto by Pierre-Henri de Lacretelle. It was premiered in Paris by the Société des Concerts du Conservatoire on 13 February 1870 with Gabrielle Krauss in the title role.
- Mahomet, a grand opera in four acts with a libretto by Pierre-Henri de Lacretelle. It was never staged. However, extracts from the work received favourable reviews when they were performed at the Société des Concerts in 1877, again with Gabrielle Krauss as the lead soprano.

== See also ==
- Ballerina (2016 film) where he appears as a character voiced by Joe Sheridan
