= Le caïd =

Opera by Ambroise Thomas

- Opéra bouffon by Ambroise Thomas
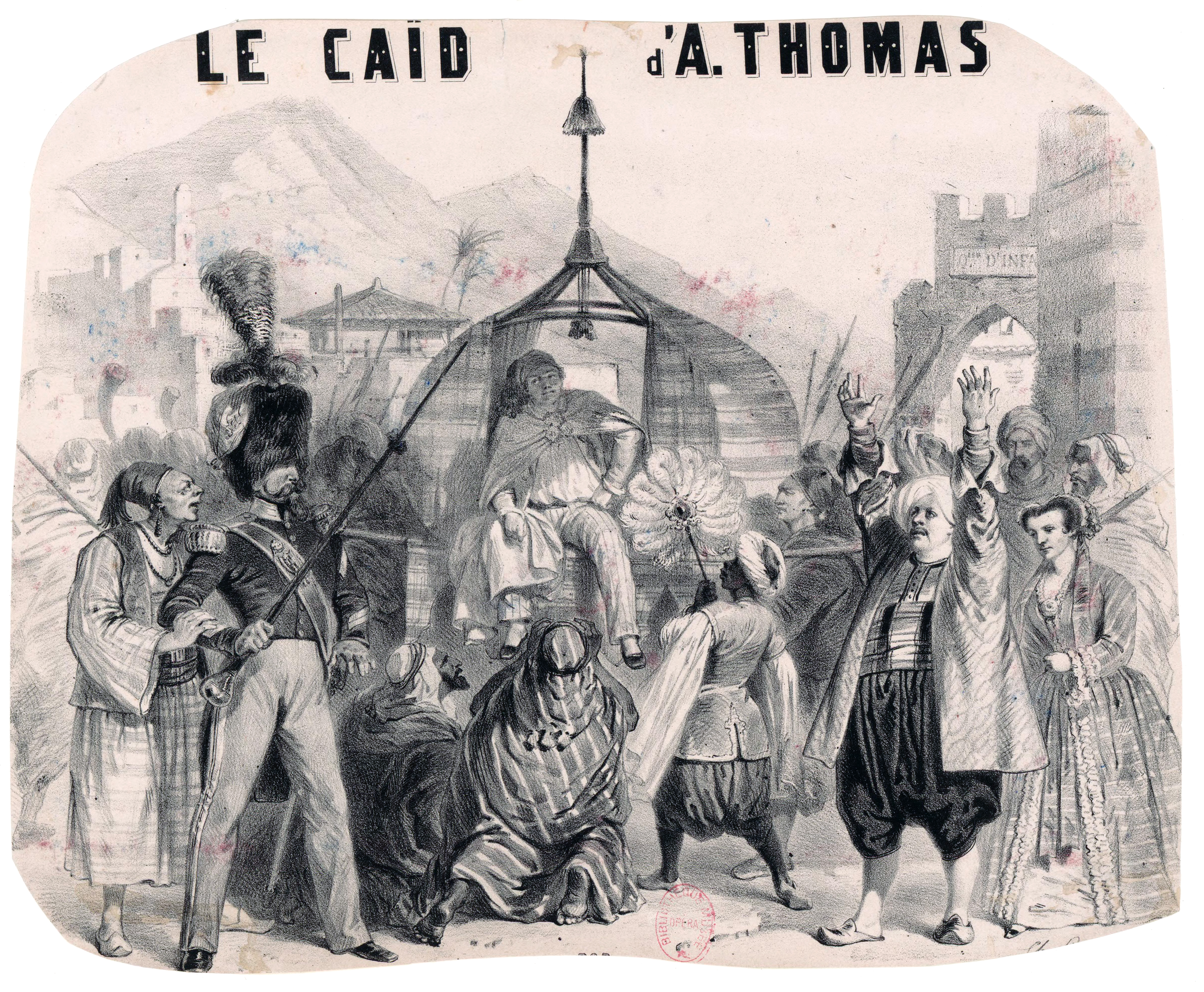
- A scene from the premiere production
- Librettist: Thomas Sauvage
- Language: French
- Premiere: 3 January 1849; Opéra-Comique, Paris

Le caïd, also spelled Le kaïd (The Qaid), is a comic opera (opéra bouffon or opéra bouffe) in two acts composed by Ambroise Thomas to a libretto by Thomas Sauvage. It was premiered on 3 January 1849 by the Opéra-Comique at the second Salle Favart in Paris. The opera was originally titled Les boudjous (The budjus). Le caïd is a rarely performed opera and is known mainly for the popular coloratura bass aria "Air du Tambor Major" (Drum Major's aria) which has been recorded by many celebrated bass singers throughout the previous century; The overture was also popular and was recorded several times by bands and orchestras in Europe and the U.S. prior to the First World War.

== Performance history ==
The premiere production of Le caïd by the Opéra-Comique was conducted by Théophile Tilmant and directed by Ernest Mocker. The opera received very favourable reviews and was Thomas's first major popular success. The work evinced a vogue for all things Algerian in the colonial power of France, which had conquered Algeria in 1830. It was revived by the Opéra-Comique on 31 August 1851, when it was given its 100th performance with Caroline Miolan-Carvalho as Virginie. It was last revived by the Opéra-Comique on 16 February 1911, receiving a total of 422 representations by that company, and was revived at the Gaîté-Lyrique on 18 May 1931. Its most recent revival was in November 2007 when it was staged at the Opéra-Théâtre in Metz in a production designed and directed by Adriano Sinivia and conducted by Jacques Mercier.

Outside France the opera was first performed in Brussels on 26 August 1849, in London at St James's Theatre on 8 February 1850, and in New Orleans at the Théâtre d'Orléans on 18 April 1850. It was given in English at the Haymarket Theatre in London on 18 June 1851 (as The Cadi, or Amours among Moors) and in Manchester on 8 December 1880. It was performed in German in Vienna in 1856, Berlin in 1857, and Prague in 1860, and in Italian in Milan in 1863, Barcelona in 1865, Florence in 1877, and Naples in 1889.

== Roles ==
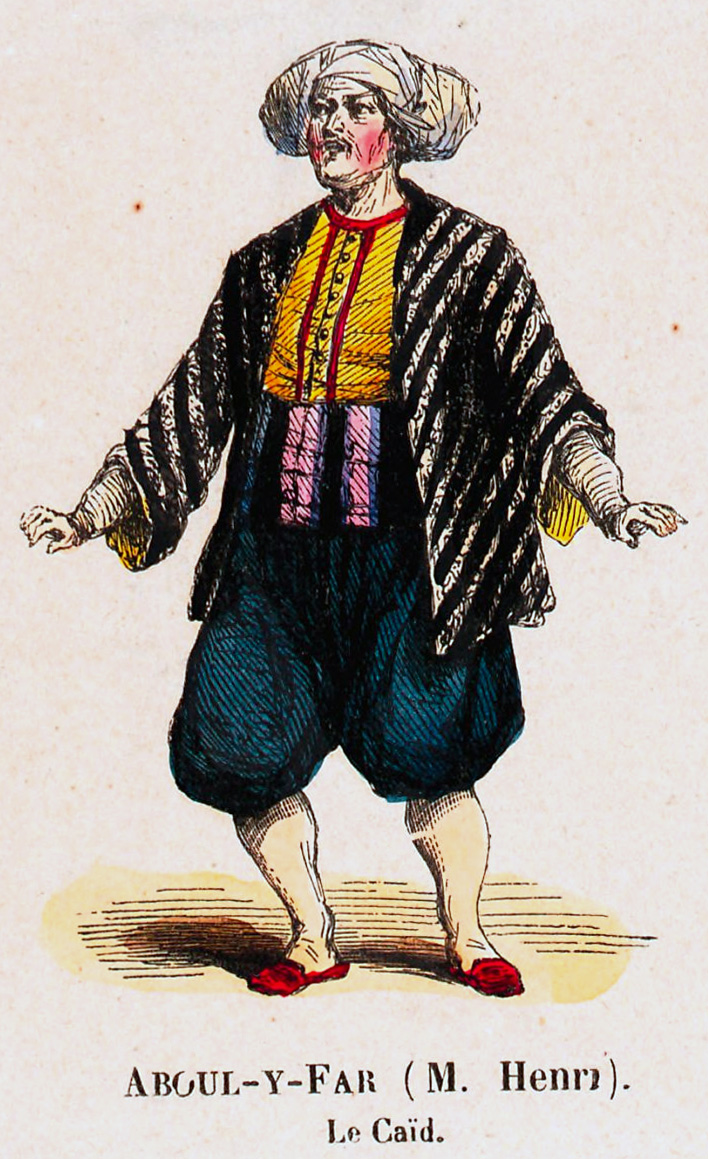
Costume design for the role of Aboul-y-far, 1849

Roles, voice types, premiere cast
Role	Voice type	Premiere cast, 3 January 1849 Conductor: Théophile Tilmant
Aboul-y-far, an Algerian caïd	bass	Henri (François-Louis Henry)
Fathma, Aboul-y-far's daughter	soprano	Marguerite Decroix
Virginie, a French milliner	soprano	Delphine Ugalde
Birotteau, a French hairdresser	tenor	Jean-Jacques Boulo
Ali-Bajou, the caïd's steward	tenor	Charles-Louis Sainte-Foy
Michel, a French drum-major	baritone	Léonard Hermann-Léon
Muezzin	bass	Lejeune
Kabyles; the Caïd's guards; French officers, drummers, soldiers; male and female slaves

== Synopsis ==
Setting: A town in French Algeria in the 1840s

Aboul-y-far, the caïd of an Algerian town under French control, is regularly beaten up by his subjects in protest against the taxes and fines that he imposes on them. Birotteau, a French hairdresser with a shop in the town, approaches the caïd with the offer of a "secret talisman" which will protect him from the depredations of his subjects. The price is 20,000 boudjous. The caïd, a notorious miser, offers him his daughter Fathma's hand in marriage instead. Birotteau is flattered by the proposal and accepts the offer, forgetting that he is already engaged to Virginie, who owns a millinery shop in the town.

Meanwhile, the caïd's steward and factotum, Ali-Bajou, has a different plan afoot to protect his master. He fosters a passionate romance between Fathma and Michel, the drum-major of the occupying French army. When Michel and Virginie hear of Birotteau's deal with the caïd, they are furious. Faced with Virginie's vow of vengeance and Michel's threat to cut his ears off, Birotteau refuses to marry Fathma in exchange for the "secret talisman" after all. The caïd reluctantly pays Birotteau the 20,000 boudjous, only to discover that the talisman is a recipe for a hair pomade which purportedly cures baldness. In the end, Ali-Bajou becomes happily drunk on French wine. Virginie and Birotteau are married, as are Fathma and Michel. Michel becomes the caïd's bodyguard, and the caïd's only regret is that the whole affair has cost him 20,000 boudjous.

== Reception ==
The opera was admired by the French composers Hector Berlioz and Georges Bizet, as well as the French poet Théophile Gautier. Some other taste-setters had some reservations. Félix Clément and Pierre Larousse in their 1869 Dictionnaire lyrique described Le caïd as follows:

It cannot be denied that this work is amusing and the music very agreeable. Nevertheless, in our view, the whole has a touch of vulgarity about it, a familiarity and parody which is not part of the opera-buffa, nor of the old opéra-comique. The score teems with charming melodies. In the harmony, under a piquant exterior, lie the purest and most learned forms; the instrumentation is ravishing. So from where does this impression come that we have spoken of above? It is likely due to the disparity of costume and theatrical genre, that people of taste saw with pain ever increasingly popular in France, pieces in which no true sentiment is taken seriously, and the spectator finds no respite from the buffooneries and stunts [cascades] of the actors. A continual alliance of the most noble of the arts with the weak sides of human character seems to us regrettable.
