= Le toréador =

Opéra bouffon in two acts by Adolphe Adam

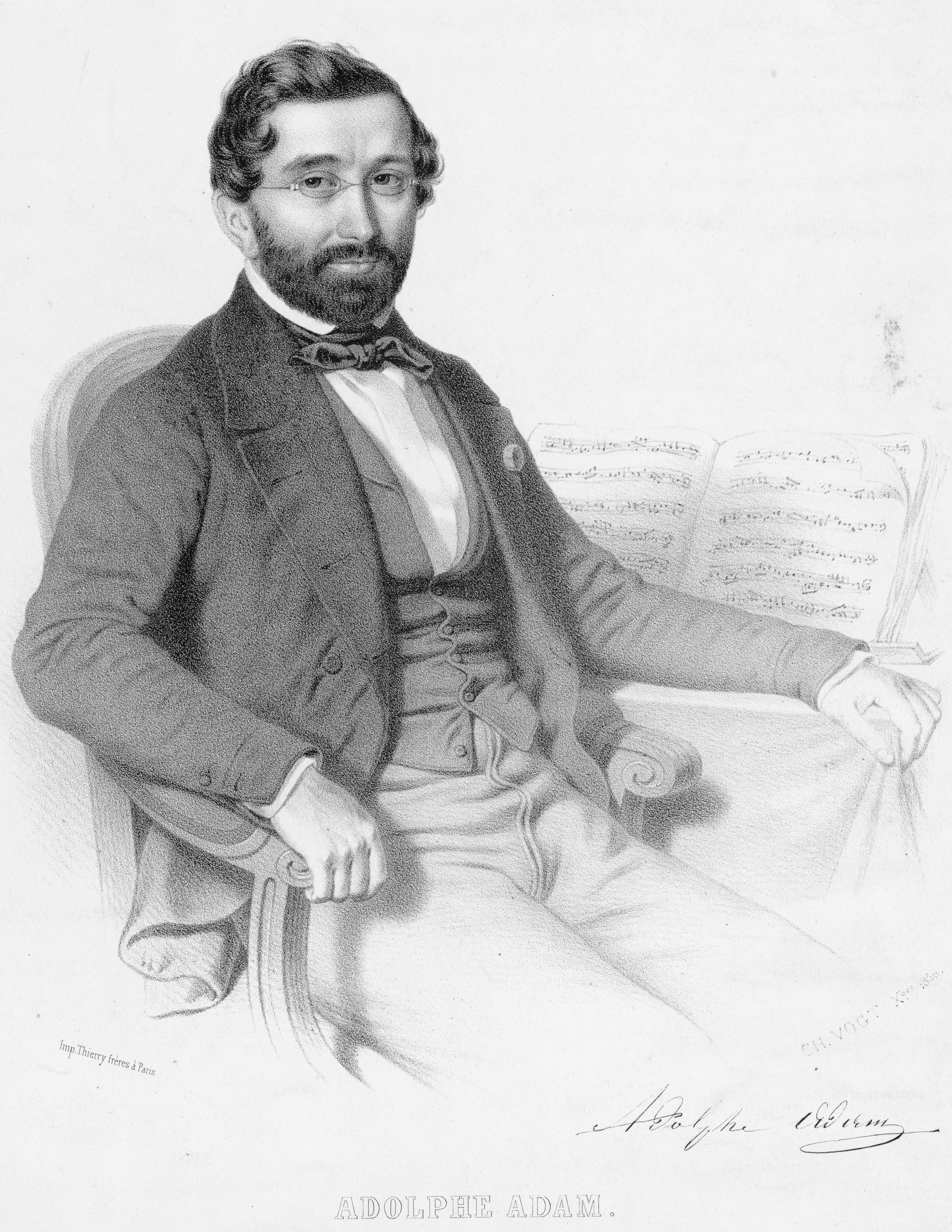
Adolphe Adam, Lithograph, 1850

Le toréador, ou L'accord parfait (The Toreador, or The Perfect Agreement) is an opéra bouffon in two acts by Adolphe Adam with a libretto by Thomas Sauvage. It was first performed at the Opéra-Comique, Paris on 18 May 1849.

== Background ==
Adam wrote Le Toréador in six days in response to a commission. He was far from sure of it being a success but variations for Coraline on Ah ! vous dirai-je, maman were immediately popular and the work remained in the repertoire until 1911. Originally a single-act work, it was soon split to allow the soprano time to recover her breath in the taxing role of Coraline.

Adam borrowed several existing pieces of music for his score, the most familiar being the circa 1740 French nursery rhyme Ah! vous dirai-je, maman, whose melody is known in the English-speaking world with the words Twinkle, twinkle, little star. He treats it to a series of (sung) variations, as Mozart had done (for piano solo) in 1782. Adam quotes the aria Tandis que tout sommeille from Grétry's L'amant jaloux as well as Je brûlerai d'une flamme éternelle from the same composer's Le tableau parlant. He also uses various folk tunes, including one for the Spanish fandango and another for the cachucha dance, and borrows the often quoted Renaissance tune from Portugal, La folia. Kaminski sees music as the fourth character in the opera: the pieces played on the flute by Tracolin, Coraline's vocal prowess which allows a scene recalling the singing lesson in The Barber of Seville; he even finds a premonition of the galop infernal of Orphée aux enfers.

== Roles ==
Role	Voice type	Premiere Cast, 18 May 1849 (Conductor: Théophile Tilmant)
Don Belflor a retired toreador	bass	Charles Battaille
Coraline his wife	soprano	Delphine Ugalde
Tracolin	tenor	Toussaint-Eugène-Ernest Mocker

== Synopsis ==
Place: The garden of Don Belflor's house in Barcelona

=== Act One ===
Coraline, a former opera singer from Paris, is unhappily married to the retired bullfighter Don Belflor. She remembers how a flute-player, Tracolin, was in love with her. At this point, Tracolin himself appears in Barcelona, intent on renewing his acquaintance with Coraline. The two exchange love letters over the garden wall. Tracolin saves Don Belfor from an attack by ruffians and is invited into his house. He claims he is acting as a go-between for a dancer at the opera, Caritéa, who has fallen in love with Don Belflor. The old man is flattered but asks for further proof and Tracolin can think of no other recourse but to give him Coraline's letter. As Don Belflor is leaving for liaison with Caritéa, Coraline accuses him of adultery. In his confusion Don Belflor drops the letter on the floor. The horrified Coraline believes that she has been found out.

=== Act Two ===
Coraline cannot understand why Don Belfor has not reacted angrily to the contents of the letter. Tracolin climbs over the garden wall and tells her he has been in love with her since they met at the opera. He reveals the details of her husband's adultery then leaves the garden. When Don Belflor returns, Coraline again accuses him of infidelity. He admits the truth when she mentions the name "Caritéa" and begs for her forgiveness. She accepts so long as she is allowed to keep Tracolin in the house as her lover. Don Belflor, who does not want to lose the generous dowry the marriage brought him, agrees.

== Musical numbers ==
- Overture

Act I

- Introduction
- No. 1 Scène et couplets « Je tremble et doute » (Coraline)
- No. 2 Trio « La voilà là » (Coraline, Tracolin, Belfior)
- No. 3 Air « Oui la vie » (Belfior)
- No. 4 Couplets « Vous connaissez de ces femmes aimables » (Tracolin)
- No. 5 Trio « Ah ! vous dirai-je, maman » (Coraline, Tracolin, Belfior)
- No. 6 Duo « Qu'est cela ? » (Coraline, Belfior)

Act II

- No. 7 Entr'acte
- No. 8 Air « Avec son petit air » (Coraline)
- No. 9 Air « Dans vos regards » (Tracolin)
- No. 10 Trio final « Oh ! tremblez » (Coraline, Tracolin, Belfior)

== Recordings ==
- Mady Mesplé (Coraline), Raymond Amade (Tracolin), Charles Clavensy (Don Belflor) Orchestre Lyrique de l'ORTF conducted by Eugène Bigot (Musidisc, recorded Paris, Maison de la Radio 23 January 1963)
- Sumi Jo (Coraline), John Aler (Tracolin), Michel Trempont (Don Belflor), Orchestra of the Welsh National Opera, conducted by Richard Bonynge (Decca, recorded Brangwyn Hall, Swansea June 1996)

== Sources ==
- Casaglia, Gherardo (2005). "Le toréador, 18 May 1849". L'Almanacco di Gherardo Casaglia (in Italian).
- Booklet notes to the above recording.
