= Théophile Tilmant =

French violinist and conductor (1799–1878)

Theophile Tilmant
- Born: Théophile (Joseph Alexandre) Tilmant; 9 July 1799; Valenciennes
- Died: 7 May 1878 (aged 78)
- Education: Conservatoire national supérieur de musique et de danse de Paris

Théophile (Joseph Alexandre) Tilmant, (Tilmant aîné) was a French violinist and conductor born on 9 July 1799 in Valenciennes France, and died on 7 May 1878, Asnières.Tilmant was a founding Sociétaire of the Société des Concerts in 1828, becoming a Chef and Vice-President on 5 May 1860, retiring from the Société on 17 November 1863.

== Bibliography ==
Tilmant was a founding Sociétaire of the Société des Concerts in 1828, becoming a Chef and Vice-President on 5 May 1860, retiring from the Société on 17 November 1863.

At the Conservatoire national supérieur de musique et de danse de Paris, he was a student of Kreutzer and played in the orchestra of the Opéra-Comique and the orchestra of the Opéra (viola from 1824 and violin from 1826–38).

He also led the orchestra at the Théâtre-Italien and the Concerts du Gymnase. He was principal conductor of the Opéra-Comique from 1849-68. Tilmant received the Légion d'Honneur in 1861.

Tilmant conducted the premieres of Le caïd by Ambroise Thomas on 3 January 1849, Le toréador by Adolphe Adam on 18 May 1849, Galathée by Victor Massé on 14 April 1852, Le Sourd ou l’Auberge Pleine by Adam on 2 February 1853, Les noces de Jeannette by Massé on 4 February 1853, L'étoile du nord on 16 February 1854, and Mignon by Thomas on 17 November 1866.

Preceded by Narcisse Girard	Principal Conductor, Orchestre de la Société des Concerts du Conservatoire; 1860–1863	Succeeded by François George-Hainl
