= Salle des Concerts Herz =

Coordinates: 48.8751°N 2.3357°E

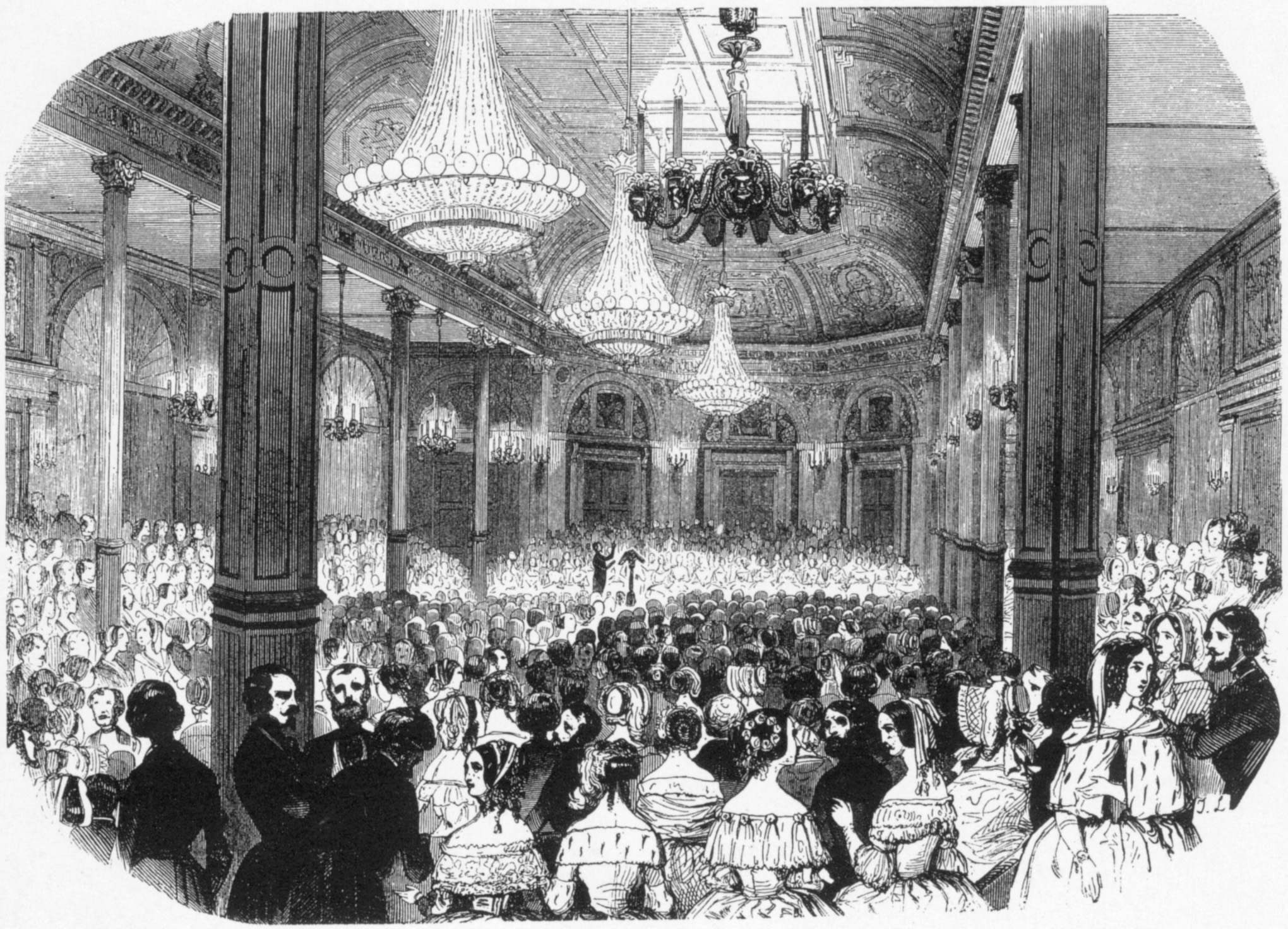
Interior view of the Salle Herz in 1843

The Salle des Concerts Herz, usually referred to simply as the Salle Herz, was a concert hall in Paris, located at 48, rue de la Victoire. It was built in 1838 by the French pianist-composer Henri Herz.

The hall was used for public performances. Hector Berlioz conducted the premières of two of his compositions there – the overture Le Carnaval romain on 3 February 1844 and L'enfance du Christ on 10 December 1854. Offenbach's 'tableau villageois' Le trésor à Mathurin was performed there 'in concert' on 7 May 1853, and Offenbach himself performed there as a cellist.

The first public performance of the saxophone took place there on 3 February 1844.

Non-musical events were also held in the hall. An anti-slavery conference was held there on 27 August 1867 by the British and Foreign Anti-Slavery Society.

The Salle Herz was still being used to mount concerts by Jules Danbé in 1874 but was subsequently demolished.
