= Delphine Ugalde =

French singer and composer

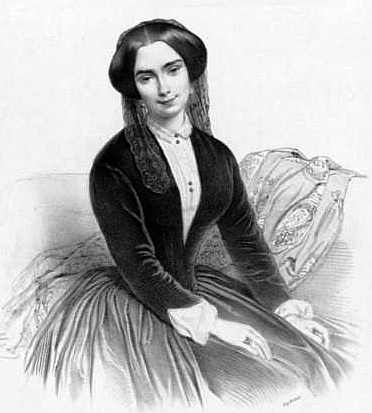
Delphine Ugalde

Gabrielle Delphine Ugalde, née Beaucé (3 December 1829 – 19 July 1910), was a French soprano and composer. She was the mother of Marguerite Ugalde.

== Biography ==
Delphine Ugalde was born in Paris. After studies with her mother and the tenor Théodore-François Moreau-Sainti in Paris, she made her debut at the Opéra Comique in 1848 as Angèle in Auber’s Le Domino noir, followed by L'Ambassadrice. She went on to create roles in several popular operas of the time including the title role in Galathée by Victor Massé on 14 April 1852, Virginie in Le Caïd by Thomas on 3 January 1849 and Coraline in Le Toréador on 18 May 1849. After a break, she returned for Psyché (Eros) by Thomas on 26 January 1857.

She sang in Auber's L’Enfant prodigue in London in 1851. At the Paris Opéra she sang Alice in Robert le diable in 1851 and Leonora in Il Trovatore (1858).

In 1858, she made her debut at the Théâtre Lyrique, where she sang Suzanne in Les Noces de Figaro, Carabosse Mélodine in La Fée Carabosse by Massé (28 February 1859), Blondine in L'Enlèvement au Sérail (1859), Martine in Ma tante dort (21 Jan 1860), and the title role in Gil Blas (24 March 1860). Her final benefit performance on 14 May 1860 was a lavish affair with, as well as many popular singers, contributions from Massé, Sarasate and Gounod. She returned briefly in 1865 to sing Papagena.

In February 1861, Ugalde escaped a serious stage accident while singing in a performance of Le Caïd in Caen. From 1863, she sang at the Théâtre des Bouffes-Parisiens (Orphée aux enfers, Les Bavards), including her own operetta La Halte au moulin (1867), retired from the stage in 1871, but performed again in the sole role of her comic opera Seule in 1873.

Ugalde took over the direction of the Bouffes-Parisiens in 1885 and for her first production – La Béarnaise by Messager – brought Jeanne Granier out of semi-retirement for the double part of Jacquette/Jacquet.

Among her pupils were her daughter Marguerite Ugalde and Marie Sass. Ugalde died in Paris.

== Compositions ==
Operas

- La Halte au moulin. Opéra comique en 1 acte (Constant Jardry), Paris: E. Gérard et Cie., 1868. See vocal score at Gallica.
- Seule. Opéra comique à un seul personnage, chanté par Mme Ugalde (Francis Tourte), Paris: A. O'Kelly, 1873.

Vocal music

- Vingt Mélodies (Adrien Dézamy), Paris: Louis Gregh, 1878.
- L'Elève de St Cyr (Eugène Leterrier, Albert Vanloo), Paris: Enoch frères et Costallat, 1882.
- Le Bal des roses. Rondeau (M. Klanko), Paris: Choudens fils, 1889.
- Tantum ergo (bibl.), Paris: Choudens fils, 1889.
- Les Sabots. Chansonnette (A. Robbé, A. Larsonneur), Paris: E. Benoit, 1892.

Piano music

- Deux Polkas brillantes, Paris: Au Ménestrel, Henri Heugel, 1851.
