= Jules Danbé =

French violinist, composer and conductor

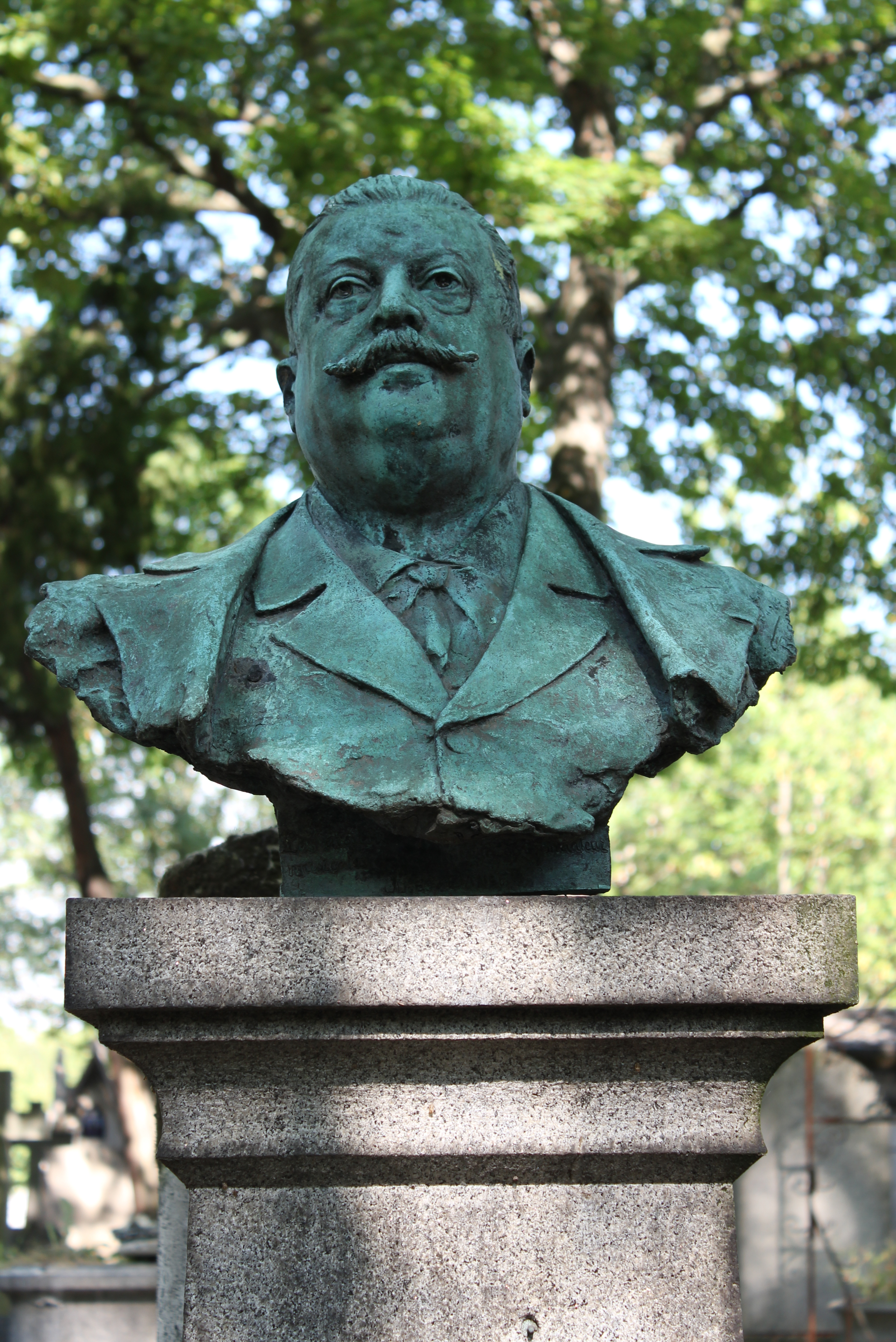
Bust of Jules Danbé by Georges Récipon.

Jules Danbé (16 November 1840 – 30 October 1905) was a French violinist, composer and conductor, mainly of opera.

== Biography ==
Danbé was born in Caen, Calvados. Trained as a violinist, he was a pupil of Narcisse Girard and Marie Gabriel Augustin Savard, in 1859 winning a first prize for violin. He gained much experience playing in the orchestras of the Vaudeville, Théâtre Lyrique and with the Concerts Pasdeloup, and in 1871 founded the Concerts Danbé at the Grand-Hôtel in Paris, as well mounting concerts at the Salle Herz in 1874 and the Salle Ventadour in 1875.

Danbé was principal conductor at the Théâtre de la Gaîté-Lyrique in 1876, conducting Dimitri, Les Erynnies and Paul et Virginie (whose premiere at the Opéra-Comique he also conducted). Appointed conductor at the Opéra-Comique on 2 June 1877, he took up his duties on 1 September that year, remaining until April 1898. His tenure, assisted by Henri Vaillard and Giannini, was considered to have improved the quality of the orchestral playing; in 1889, a performance of the Verdi Requiem drew the comment that the orchestra was probably the best in Paris.

As well as conducting the central repertoire at the Opéra-Comique he conducted the premieres of the following operas:

- Le timbre d’argent (Saint-Saëns) 23 February 1877
- The Tales of Hoffmann (Offenbach) 10 February 1881
- Lakmé (Delibes) 14 April 1883
- Manon (Massenet) 19 January 1884
- Le roi malgré lui (Chabrier) 18 May 1887
- Esclarmonde (Massenet) 14 May 1889
- La Basoche (Messager) 30 May 1890
- L'attaque du moulin (Bruneau) 23 November 1893
- Le flibustier (Cui) 22 January 1894
- Le portrait de Manon (Massenet) 8 May 1894
- Sapho (Massenet) 27 November 1897

He also conducted an early revival by the Opéra-Comique of Les Troyens à Carthage (in the same theatre as its premiere) in June 1892 which witnessed a triumphant début for the 17-year-old Marie Delna.

Danbé was Director of Music of the Foundation Beaulieu (1888-1905). A member of the Paris Conservatoire Orchestra, Danbé resigned in May 1884 but re-joined on 3 June 1884 and took the Second chair, First Violins, on 14 October 1884, joining Jules Garcin, concertmaster, becoming 2nd chef (and concertmaster) on 2 June 1885, replacing Garcin, and retiring from the Société on 3 June 1892. He was a mentor and teacher for Pierre Monteux, whom he presented for entry at the Conservatoire.

After leaving the Opéra-Comique, in 1899 he moved to the Théâtre Lyrique de la Renaissance, where he conducted a rare production of Iphigénie en Tauride in December of that year, and also conducted classical concerts at the casinos of Néris-les-Bains and Vichy.

He composed works for violin and was author of a violin method. He received the Légion d'Honneur in 1885.

Danbé died in Paris on October 30, 1905, and is buried at Père Lachaise Cemetery.
