= Charles-Louis Sainte-Foy =

French operatic tenor

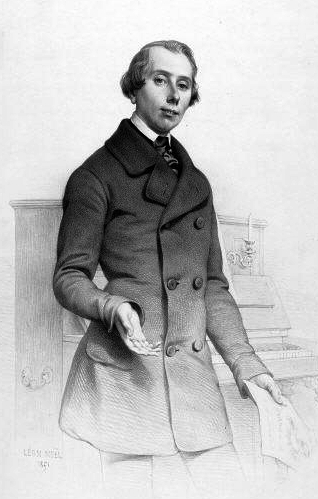
Sainte-Foy

Charles-Louis Sainte-Foy, born Charles-Louis Pubereaux, also known simply as Sainte-Foy (13 February 1817 – 1 April 1877) was a French operatic tenor who sang at the Opéra-Comique for over 30 years.

== Life and career ==
Sainte-Foy was born in Vitry-le-François, a small town in north-eastern France. His father, Jean Pubereaux, was a musician who had been given the nickname "Sainte-Foy" by his army comrades during the Napoleonic Wars. When he was discharged from the army, he gave music lessons and opened the Café Sainte-Foy in Vitry. The young Charles-Louis was originally apprenticed to a cabinet maker, but after displaying little enthusiasm for the job, his father sent him to the Paris Conservatory in 1836 where he studied music under Garaudé and Panseron and acting with Morin.

Sainte-Foy made his debut at the Opéra-Comique in 1840 and became one of its most popular tenors, not so much for the quality of his voice but for his ability as a comic actor. It was said of him that "the Opéra-Comique without Sainte-Foy is like dinner without wine." In 1845 Jean-Pierre Dantan made a sculptural caricature of him as Bertrand in Monsigny's Le déserteur, one of his signature roles. During the course of his career he created numerous character roles including Ali-Bajou in Thomas's Le caïd and Patachon in Offenbach's Les deux aveugles. He retained a great affection for his native town and returned to Vitry every year to give a charity performance in the small theatre there. Sainte-Foy died in Paris at the age of 60.
