= Thomas Sauvage =

French dramatist, theatre director and critic

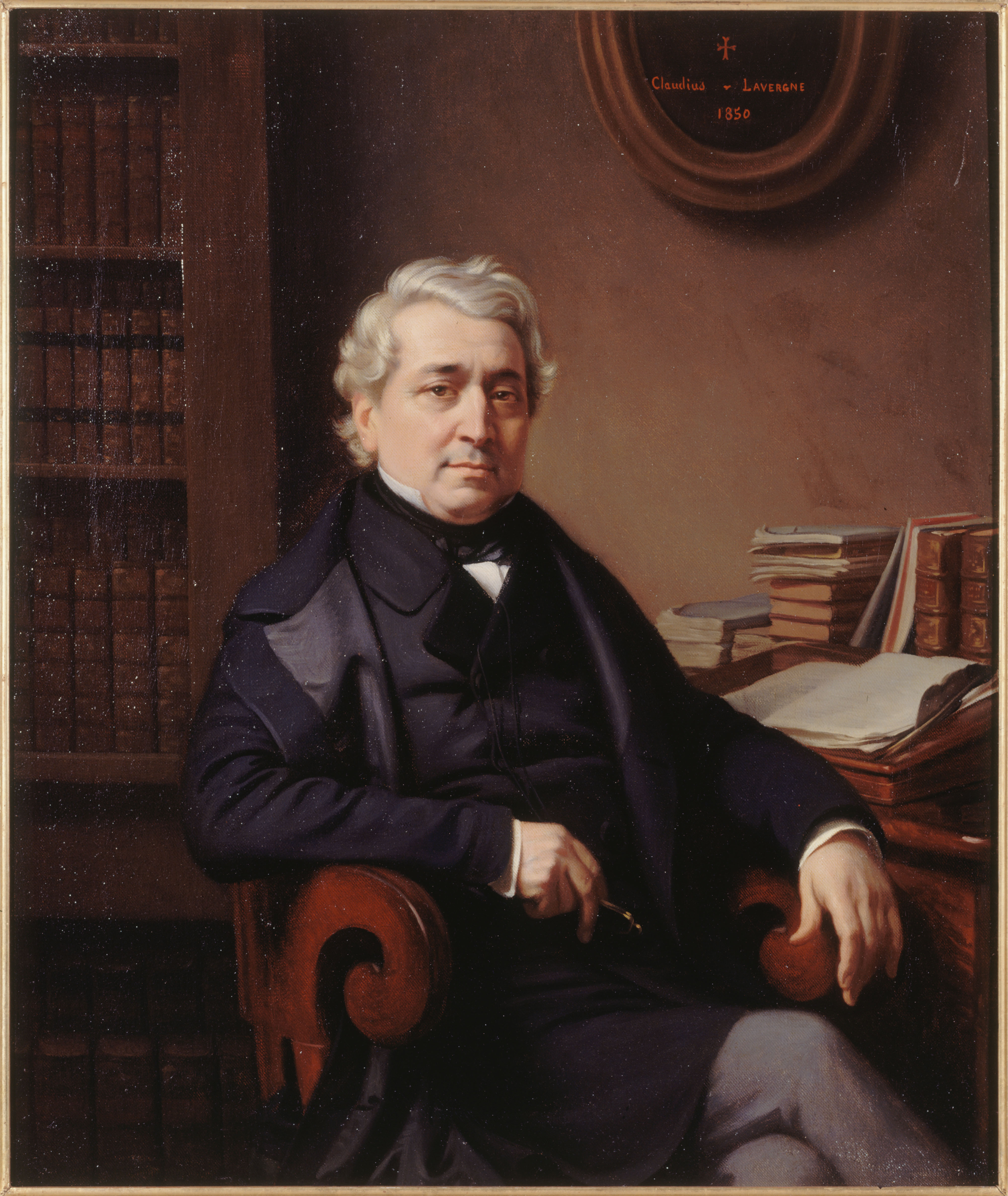
Portrait by Claudius Lavergne, 1850

Thomas-Marie-François Sauvage (French pronunciation: [tɔma maʁi fʁɑ̃swa sovaʒ]; 1794 - May 1877) was a French dramatist, theatre director and critic.

Sauvage collaborated with Adolphe Adam (an opéra comique in two acts Le Toréador, 1849), Albert Grisar (Gilles ravisseur, 1838; L'Eau merveilleuse, 1839; Les Porcherons, 1850), François Bazin (Madelon, 1852), Napoléon Henri Reber (Le Père Gaillard, 1852) and Ambroise Thomas (Angélique et Médor, 1843; an opéra bouffon or opéra bouffe Le Caïd, 1849; La Tonelli, 1853; Le Carnaval de Venise, 1857; Gilles et Gillotin, 1874).

Sauvage was managing director of the Théâtre de l'Odéon from 1827 to 1828.

== Bibliography ==
- Christian Goubault, "Thomas-Marie-François Sauvage" in Joël-Marie Fauquet (dir.), Dictionnaire de la musique en France au XIX siècle, Fayard, Paris, 2003 (ISBN 2-213-59316-7)
