= François George-Hainl =

French cellist and conductor (1807–1873)

- Born: 16 November 1807
- Origin: France
- Died: June 2, 1873 (aged 65)
- Occupation: Conductor
- Instrument: Cellist

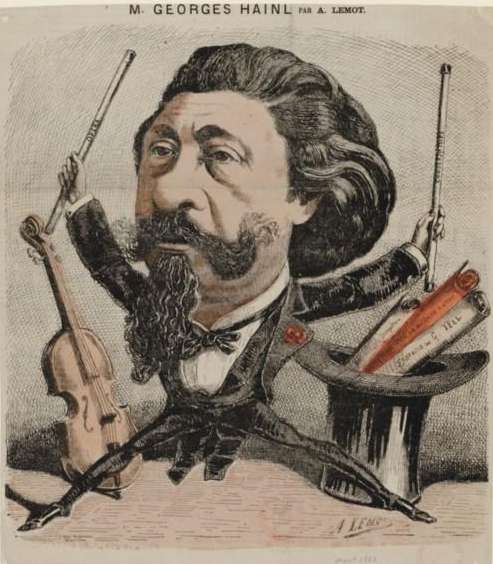
George-Hainl by Achille Lemot

François George-Hainl (16 November 1807 – 2 June 1873) was a French cellist and conductor.

He was born in Issoire. His father, who worked as both cobbler and amateur fiddler, gave him his first lessons. Hainl progressed so fast on the cello and worked so hard that he was soon able to join the orchestra of the Grand-Théâtre de Lyon. However, wishing to complete his studies he entered the Paris Conservatoire, and won a first prize in the 1830 competition. He undertook tours to France and Belgium; passing through Lyon he was offered a permanent post. He in due course became a member of the Lyon Académie des Sciences, belles-lettres et arts, before being called on in 1863 to succeed Dietsch at the Paris Opera.

During the ten years he spent at the Opéra he mounted Le docteur Magnus, Roland à Roncevaux, L’Africaine, Don Carlos, La fiancée de Corinthe, Hamlet, Erostrate, La coupe du roi de Thulé and the adaptation of Faust for the Opéra, and the ballets La maschera, Néméa, Le roi d'Yvetot, La source, Coppélia and Gretna-Green.

As conductor of the Orchestre de la Société des Concerts du Conservatoire from 1863 to 1872, François George-Hainl conducted 116 concerts, the first on 10 January 1864. At the Conservatoire concerts, alongside the repertoire of the time, he introduced music such as the Salve regina by Lassus, excerpts from Armide by Lully, Psalms 42 and 98 by Mendelssohn, piano concertos by Beethoven, Rubinstein and Saint-Saëns (with the composer the soloist in the latter), Schumann's Spring Symphony and Manfred overture, choruses from Wagner operas and violin concertos by Garcin and Joncières (played by Jules Danbé). He also conducted the concert in memory of Meyerbeer.

George-Hainl died in Paris.

Preceded by Théophile Tilmant	Principal Conductor, Orchestre de la Société des Concerts du Conservatoire; 1863–1872	Succeeded by Edouard Deldevez
