= Léon Le Cieux =

French classical violinist

Léon Le Cieux (12 May 1821 – 15 February 1873) was a French classical violinist.

== Biography ==
Born in Bayeux, the son of a doctor, Le Cieux found in his father's home the greatest facilities to satisfy a vocation, which had been announced early in his life. His first violin master was an artist from Bayeux, named Trébutien, who made him begin at the age of thirteen, in one of the concerts of the local philharmonic society.

Received with enthusiasm by his fellow citizens, Le Cieux continued to work with ardour and, in December 1844, he was admitted to the Conservatoire de Paris. Although over the age limit, he entered Habeneck's class where he remained until June 1846.

He left the Conservatoire without taking part in the end-of-year competitions and began, from then on, to perform in the concerts and musical soirées in Paris where he acquired a certain vogue despite the inequalities of his talent.

His urban and distinguished ways allowed him to create, as an accompanying teacher, a large clientele. He was later given an official title and, until the fall of the Second French Empire, served as first violin soloist in the Imperial Chapel.

Le Cieux wrote for the violin a number of fantasies and concert pieces. Among those that have been published are Fantaisie sur des motifs de Don Pasquale, Op. 4, Paris (Léon Grus); Fantaisie pour piano et violon sur le Duc d'Olanne, Op. 8 (Paris, Brandus); Fantaisie de concert, Op. 10 (Paris, Meissonnier et Heugel); Andante et rondo, Op. 26 (Paris, F. Mackar).

Le Cieux died in Paris.

== Sources ==
- François-Joseph Fétis, Arthur Pougin, Biographie universelle des musiciens et bibliographie générale de la musique, Paris, Firmin-Didot, 1881, p. 87.
