= Bayeux speeches =

The Bayeux speeches are two different speeches delivered by General Charles de Gaulle of France in the public square in Bayeux (formerly Place du Château, since 1946 Place de Gaulle):

- First Bayeux speech, 1944
- Second Bayeux speech, 1946
