= Joseph-Henri Altès =

French flautist, composer and pedagogue

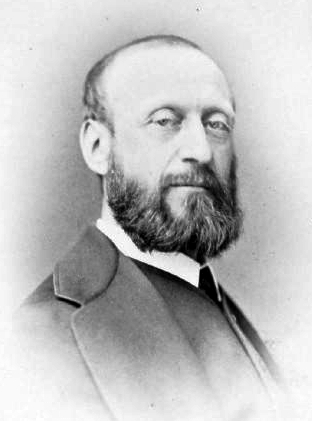
- Photograph of Joseph-Henri Altès by Pierre Petit in 1860.
- Born: 18 January 1826; Rouen
- Died: 24 July 1895 (aged 69); Paris
- Occupations: Flautist; Composer; Pedagogue

Joseph-Henri Altès (18 January 1826 – 24 July 1895) was a 19th-century French flautist, composer and pedagogue.

== Biography ==
Born in Rouen, Joseph-Henri Altès was the son of a soldier. Violinist and conductor Ernest Eugène Altès was his younger brother. He began studying the flute at the age of ten and enrolled in the Conservatoire de Paris in December 1840, where he studied in 1840-1842.

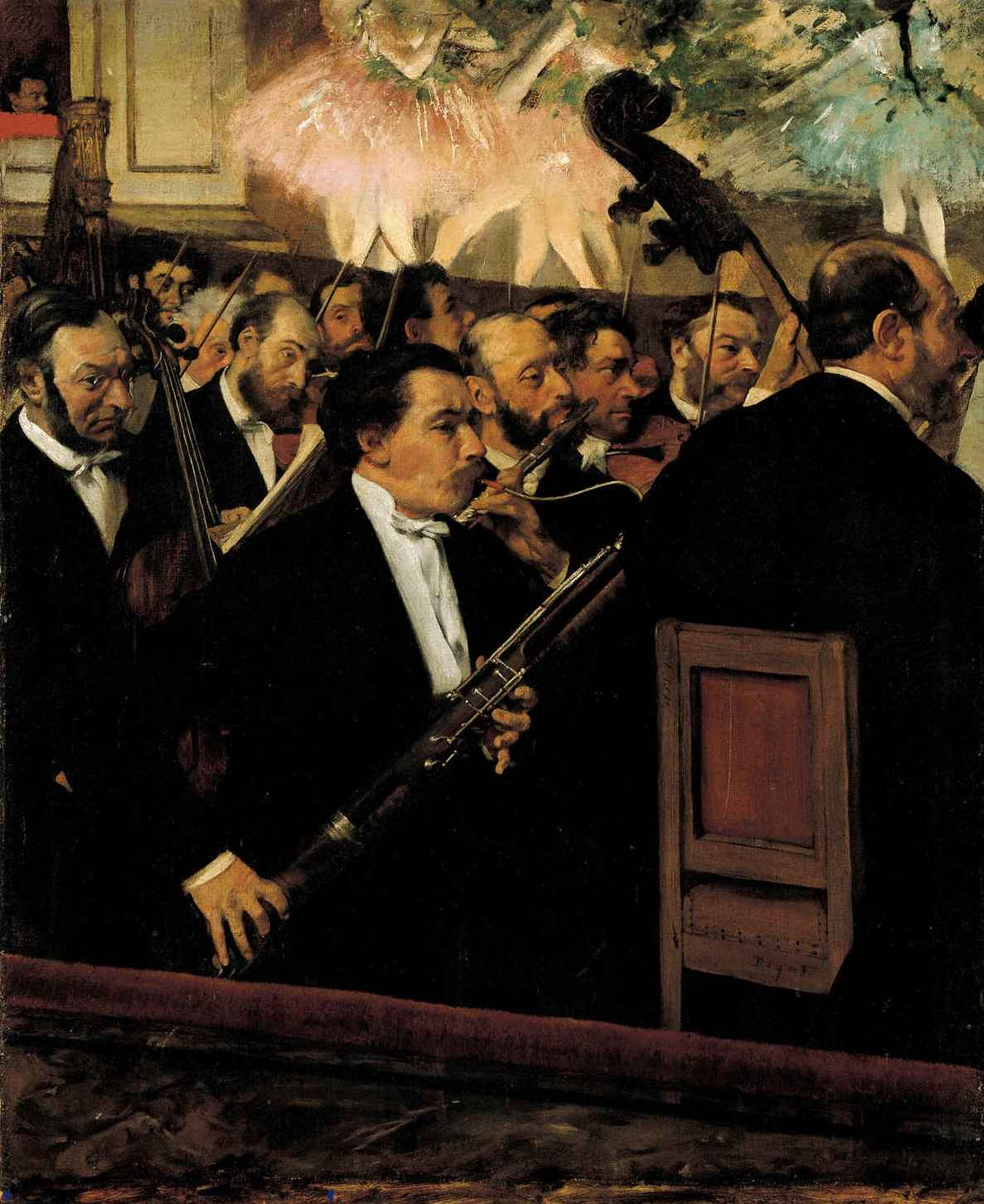
Edgar Degas, The Orchestra at the Opera (1870). Joseph-Henri Altès plays the flute, left of bassoonist Désiré Dihau.

Like his teacher, Jean-Louis Tulou, he played a flute with four keys and only later changed to a Theobald Boehm model. As early as 1841, in the competition of the Conservatory, he received a second prize and the following year a First Prize. From 1848 to 1872, he was first flautist at the Orchestre de l'Opéra national de Paris and in 1868 he was the successor of Louis Dorus as a flute teacher at the Conservatoire, where he remained until 1893. Among his pupils were Georges Barrère and Adolphe Hennebains.

Altès is the author of a method of flute, Célèbre méthode complète de flûte (1880) and left about 40 compositions, including six solos for the entrance competition at the Paris Conservatory and transcriptions or fantasies on opera themes.

Altès was a friend of the painter Edgar Degas, who depicted him in 1870 on the painting titled The Orchestra at the Opera (L'Orchestre de l'Opéra) housed at the Musée d'Orsay.

He died in Paris. He was buried on the cimetière de Montmartre (33rd division) with his wife, the opera singer Émilie-Francisque Ribault.

== Bibliography ==
- (in German) U. Pešek et Ž. Pešek, Flötenmusik aus drei Jahrhunderten (Kassel: Bärenreiter, 1990)
- (in German) A. Goldberg, Porträts und Biographien hervorragender Flöten-Virtuosen -Dilettanten und -Komponisten (Celle: Moeck, 1987 (reprint of 1906 original)
- (in German) Julia Soriano Rodríguez (ed.), Lexikon der Flöte (Laaber: Laaber-Verlag, 2009), ISBN 978-3-89007-545-7
