= Pointe Bayeux =

Mountain in Haute-Savoie, France

- Location within France

Highest point
- Elevation: 4,258 m (13,970 ft)
- Coordinates: 45°50′47″N 06°50′38″E

Geography
- Location: Haute-Savoie, France
- Parent range: Mont Blanc Massif

Pointe Bayeux is a mountain of Haute-Savoie, France. It lies in the Mont Blanc Massif range. It has an altitude of 4,258 metres above sea level.
