= Bayeux =

Subprefecture and commune in Normandy, France

- Subprefecture and commune
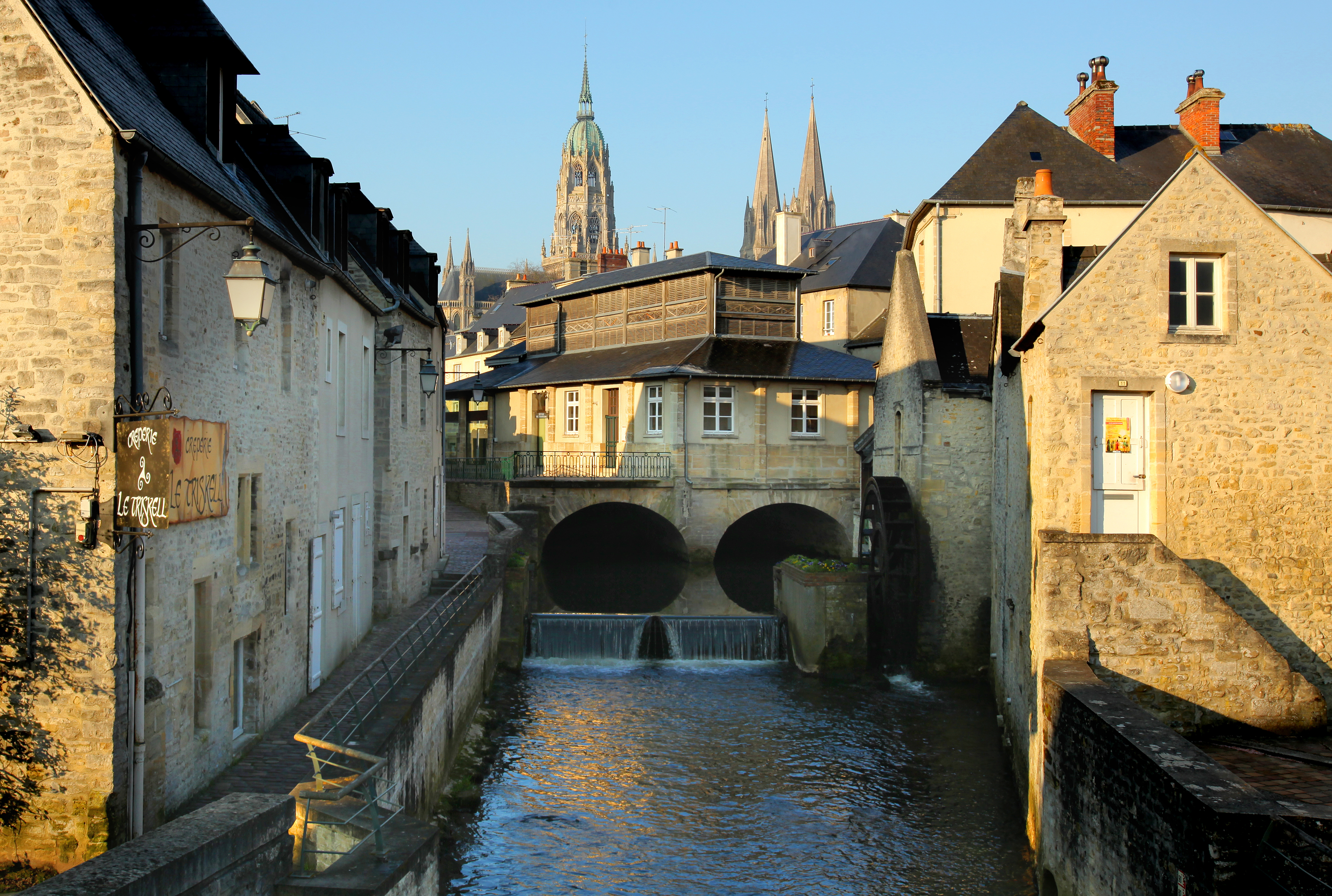
- The historic centre, the Bayeux Cathedral, the Aure and tourist office

- Coat of arms
- Location of Bayeux
- Location within France Location within Normandy
- Coordinates: 49°16′46″N 0°42′10″W
- Country: France
- Region: Normandy
- Department: Calvados
- Arrondissement: Bayeux
- Canton: Bayeux
- Intercommunality: CC Bayeux Intercom

Government
  - Mayor (2020–2026): Patrick Gomont
- Area^{1}: 7.11 km^{2} (2.75 sq mi)
- Highest elevation: 67 m (220 ft)
- Lowest elevation: 32 m (105 ft)
- Population (2023): 12,659
  - Density: 1,780/km^{2} (4,610/sq mi)
- Time zone: UTC+01:00 (CET)
  - Summer (DST): UTC+02:00 (CEST)
- INSEE/Postal code: 14047 /14400
- ^{1} French Land Register data, which excludes lakes, ponds, glaciers > 1 km^{2} (0.386 sq mi or 247 acres) and river estuaries.

Bayeux (UK: /baɪˈjɜː, beɪ-/, US: /ˈbeɪjuː, ˈbaɪ-/ B(A)Y-yoo; French: [bajø]) is a commune in the Calvados department in Normandy in northwestern France.

Bayeux is the home of the Bayeux Tapestry, which depicts the events leading up to the Norman Conquest of England in 1066. Bayeux Cathedral preserved the tapestry for centuries. It is also known as the first major town secured by the Allies during Operation Overlord after D-Day. Charles de Gaulle made two famous speeches in this town.

== Administration ==
Bayeux is a sub-prefecture of Calvados. It is the seat of the arrondissement of Bayeux and of the canton of Bayeux.

== Geography ==
Bayeux is located 7 kilometres (4 miles) from the coast of the English Channel and 30 km (19 mi) north-west of Caen. The city, with elevations varying from 32 to 67 metres (105 to 220 feet) above sea level – with an average of 46 metres (151 feet) – is bisected by the River Aure. Bayeux is located at the crossroads of RN 13 and the train route Paris-Caen-Cherbourg. The city is the capital of the Bessin, which extends north-west of Calvados. Bayeux station has rail connections to Caen, Cherbourg, Granville and Paris.

The river Aure flows through Bayeux, offering panoramic views from a number of locations. The Aure has a relatively high level of turbidity and the speed of its brownish water is moderate because of the slight slope of the watercourse, although where it is narrow in places like the centre of Bayeux, higher surface speeds are generated. In the centre of Bayeux near the Bayeux Tapestry Museum, pH levels were measured at 8.35 and the electrical conductivity of water was tested at 37 microsiemens per centimetre. Turbidity was measured at 13 centimetres by the Secchi disk method. At this point of reference, flows are generally of the order of 1.4 m^{3}/s (50 cu ft/s).

The Bajocian Age in the Jurassic Period of geological time takes its name from the Latinised name of the inhabitants of Bayeux (the Bajocassi).

== Etymology ==
The city was known as Augustodurum in the Roman Empire. It means the durum (Celtic word duro- 'door', 'gate', Welsh dor, Breton dor 'door', 'gate') dedicated to Augustus, Roman Emperor. The Celtic word duron, Latinised as durum, was probably used to translate the Latin word forum (Compare Fréjus Forum Julii, dedicated to Julius (Caesar)).

In the Late Empire it took the name of the Celtic tribe who lived here: the Bodiocassi, Latinized in Bajocassi, Bajocasses, and this word explains the place-names Bayeux and Bessin. Bodiocassi has been compared with Old Irish Buidechass 'with blond locks'.

== History ==
=== Origins ===
Founded as a Gallo-Roman settlement in the 1st century BC under the name Augustodurum, Bayeux is the capital of the former territory of the Baiocasses people of Gaul, whose name appears in Pliny's Natural History (iv.107). Evidence of earlier human occupation of the territory comes from fortified Celtic camps, but there is no evidence of any major pre-existing Celtic town before the organization of Gaul in Roman civitates. Any settlement was more likely confined to scattered Druid huts along the banks of the Aure and Drome rivers or on Mount Phaunus where they worshipped. Cemeteries have been found on the nearby Mount Phaunus indicating the area as a Druid centre. Titus Sabinus, a lieutenant of Julius Caesar, subjected the Bessin region to Roman domination. The 5th-century Notitia provinciarum et civitatum Galliae mentions Suevi that had been officially settled here (laeti).

The town is mentioned by Ptolemy, writing in the reign of Antoninus Pius, under the name Noemagus Biducassium (for *Noviomagus Badiocassium 'New market of the Badiocassi') and remained so until the time of the Roman Empire. The main street was already the heart of the city. Two baths, under the Church of St. Lawrence and the post office in rue Laitière, and a sculpted head of the goddess Minerva have been found, attesting to the adoption of Roman culture. In 1990 a closer examination of huge blocks discovered in the cathedral in the 19th century indicated the presence of an old Roman building. Bayeux was built on a crossroads between Lisieux and Valognes, developing first on the west bank of the river. By the end of the 3rd century a walled enclosure surrounded the city and remained until it was removed in the 18th century. Its layout is still visible and can be followed today. The citadel of the city was located in the southwest corner, and the cathedral in the southeast. An important city in Normandy, Bayeux was part of the coastal defence of the Roman Empire against the pirates of the region, and a Roman legion was stationed there.

=== Middle Ages ===
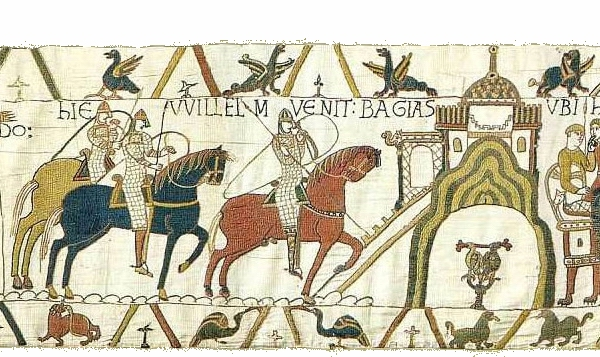
Bayeux (Bagias), depicted in scene 22 of the Bayeux Tapestry, which is housed in the town

The city was largely destroyed during the Viking raids of the late 9th century but was rebuilt in the early 10th century under the reign of Bothon. In the middle of the 10th century Bayeux was controlled by Hagrold, a pagan Viking who defended the city against the Franks. The 12th-century poet Benoît de Saint-Maure, in his verse history of the dukes of Normandy, remarked on the "Danish" commonly spoken at Bayeux in the 10th century.

The 11th century saw the creation of five villages beyond the walls to the northeast, evidence of its growth during Ducal Normandy. William the Conqueror's half brother Odo of Bayeux completed the cathedral in the city and it was dedicated in 1077. However the city began to lose prominence when William placed his capital at Caen. When King Henry I of England defeated his brother Robert Curthose for the rule of Normandy, the city was burned to set an example to the rest of the duchy. Under Richard the Lionheart, Bayeux was wealthy enough to purchase a municipal charter. From the end of Richard's reign to the end of the Hundred Years' War, Bayeux was repeatedly pillaged until Henry V of England captured the city in 1417. After the Battle of Formigny, Charles VII of France recaptured the city and granted a general amnesty to its populace in 1450. The capture of Bayeux heralded a return to prosperity as new families replaced those decimated by war, and they built some 60 mansions scattered throughout the city, with stone supplanting wood.

=== Post-medieval ===
The area around Bayeux is called the Bessin, which was the bailiwick of the province Normandy until the French Revolution.

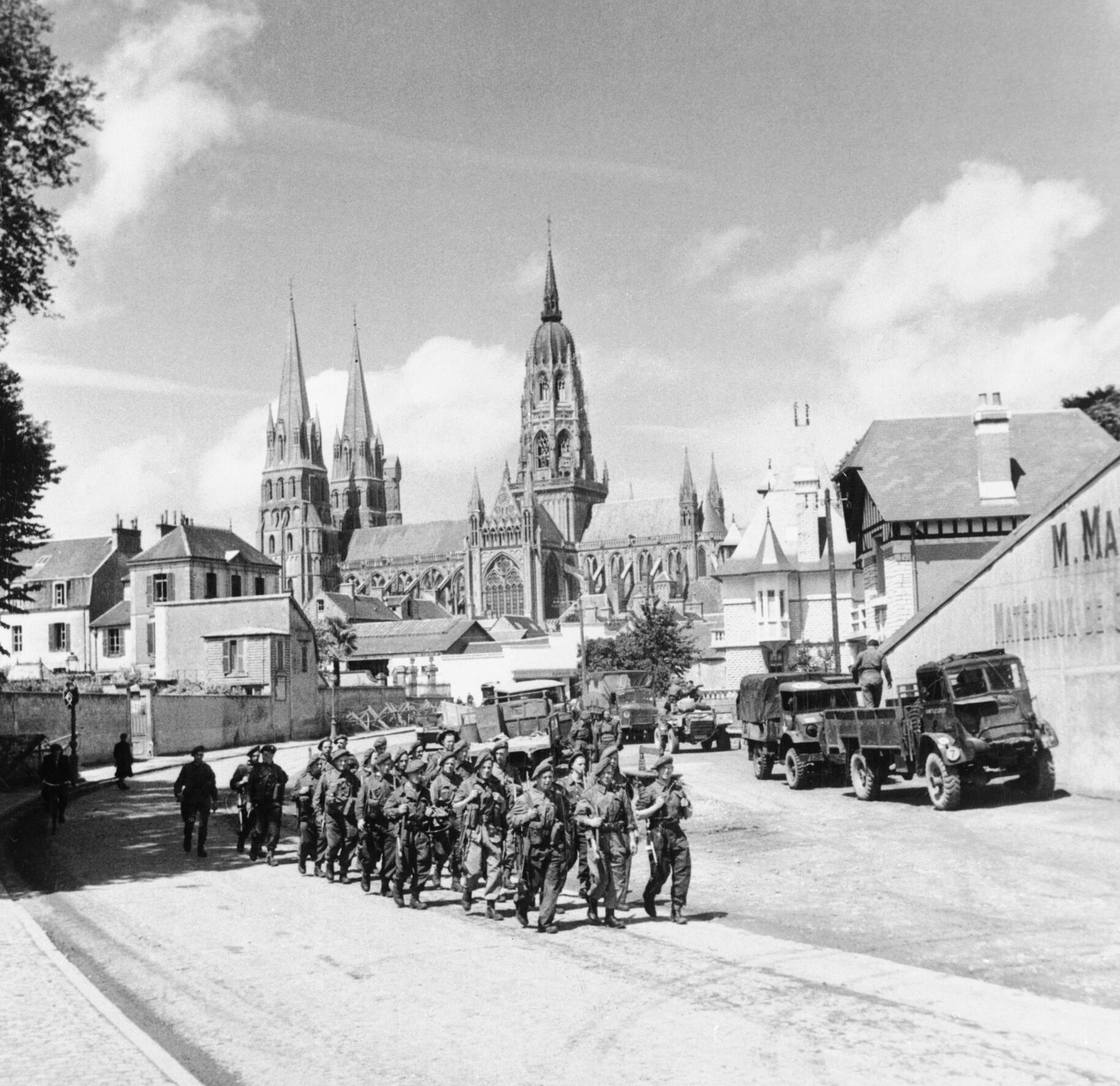
British troops marching through Bayeux, 27 June 1944. Bayeux Cathedral is in the background.

During the Second World War, Bayeux was the first city of the Battle of Normandy to be liberated on 7 June by British troops of 50th (Northumbrian) Infantry Division with only light resistance. On 16 June 1944 General Charles de Gaulle made the first of two major speeches in Bayeux in which he made clear that France sided with the Allies. The buildings in Bayeux were virtually untouched during the Battle of Normandy, the German forces being fully involved in defending Caen from the Allies. Bayeux nevertheless became an important hub for the allies - military vehicles found difficulty moving through the narrow medieval streets. In late June the Royal Engineers and Pioneer Corps built a road around the town, the 'Bayeux Bypass' – to facilitate the flow of traffic.

The Bayeux War Cemetery with its memorial includes the largest British cemetery dating from the Second World War in France. There are 4,648 graves, including 3,935 British and 466 Germans. Most of those buried there were killed in the invasion of Normandy in 1944.

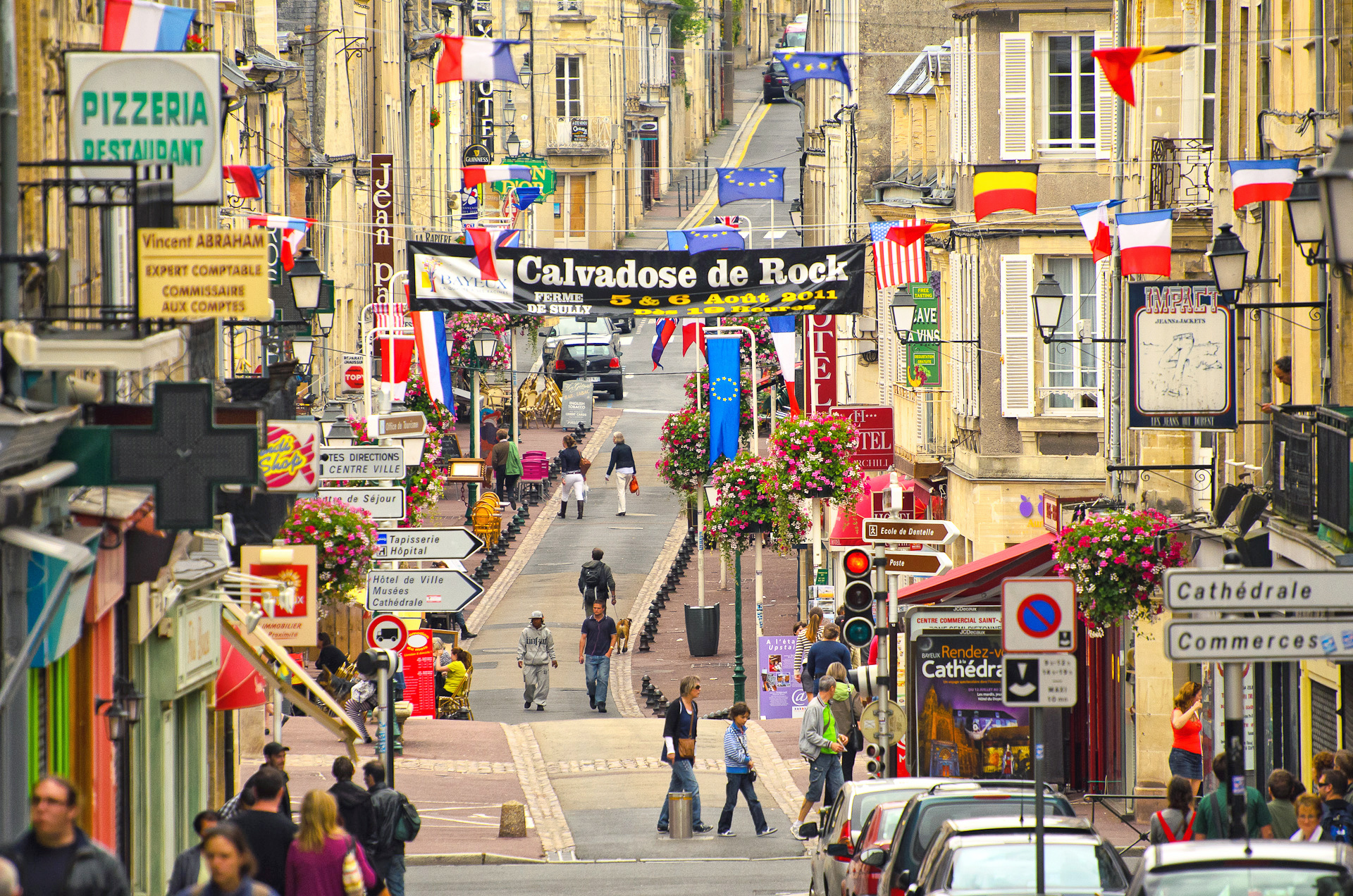
Bayeux city centre (2011)

Royal British Legion National, every 5 June at 1530 hrs, attends the 3rd Division Cean Memorial Service and beating retreat ceremony. On 6 June, it holds a remembrance service in Bayeux Cathedral starting at 1015 hrs, and later at 1200 hrs, the Royal British Legion National holds a service of remembrance at the Bayeux Cemetery. All services are open to the public, all Standards RBL, NVA, RN, ARMY, and RAF service and Regimental Associations are welcome to attend and parade. Details can be found at www.rblsomme.org.

Bayeux is also the home of a memorial to all journalists who have lost their lives while reporting. The memorial was designed by Samuel Craquelin, who is a French architect. The memorial lists the names of 1,889 journalists killed between 1944 and 2007. The memorial was established in conjunction with the organisation Reporters Without Borders and is located in Bayeux because of its historic liberation on 7 June 1944. It was inaugurated on 2 May 2007.

== Population ==
The inhabitants of Bayeux are called Bayeusains [bajøzɛ̃] or Bajocasses [baʒokas].

Historical population

Year	Pop.	±% p.a.
1793	10,578	—
1800	9,600	−1.38%
1806	10,419	+1.37%
1821	10,280	−0.09%
1831	10,303	+0.02%
1836	10,242	−0.12%
1841	9,840	−0.80%
1846	9,765	−0.15%
1851	9,360	−0.84%
1856	9,667	+0.65%
1861	9,483	−0.38%
1866	9,138	−0.74%
1872	8,536	−1.13%
1876	8,614	+0.23%
1881	8,357	−0.60%
1886	8,347	−0.02%
1891	8,102	−0.59%
1896	7,912	−0.47%
1901	7,806	−0.27%

Year	Pop.	±% p.a.
1906	7,736	−0.18%
1911	7,638	−0.25%
1921	7,206	−0.58%
1926	7,525	+0.87%
1931	7,351	−0.47%
1936	7,637	+0.77%
1946	10,246	+2.98%
1954	10,077	−0.21%
1962	9,678	−0.50%
1968	11,451	+2.84%
1975	13,457	+2.33%
1982	14,721	+1.29%
1990	14,704	−0.01%
1999	14,961	+0.19%
2007	13,911	−0.91%
2012	13,674	−0.34%
2017	13,121	−0.82%
2023	12,659	−0.60%

Source: EHESS and INSEE (1968-2023)

== Sights ==
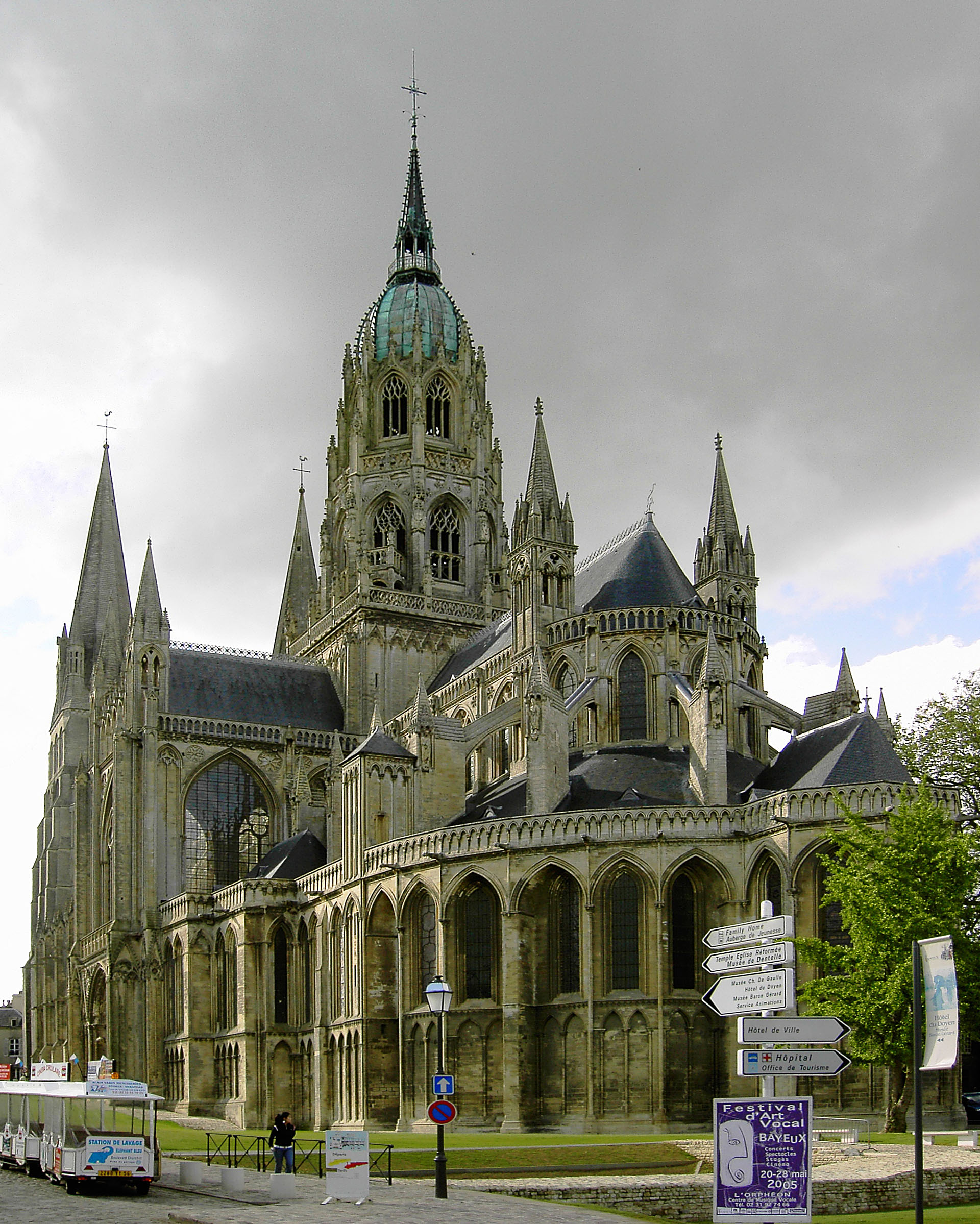
Bayeux Cathedral seen from the east.

Bayeux is a major tourist attraction, best known to British and French visitors for the Bayeux Tapestry, made to commemorate events in the Norman Conquest of England in 1066. According to French tradition, the tapestry was made by the attendants of Matilda of Flanders, wife of William the Conqueror. It was almost certainly designed and stitched in England, as evidenced by its English spellings. It is displayed in a museum in the town centre. The large Norman-Romanesque and Gothic Cathédrale Notre-Dame de Bayeux, consecrated in 1077, was probably the original home of the tapestry, where William's half-brother Odo of Bayeux (represented on the tapestry wielding a wooden club at the Battle of Hastings) would have had it displayed.

The Jardin botanique de Bayeux is a local botanical garden dating from 1864.

Pictures

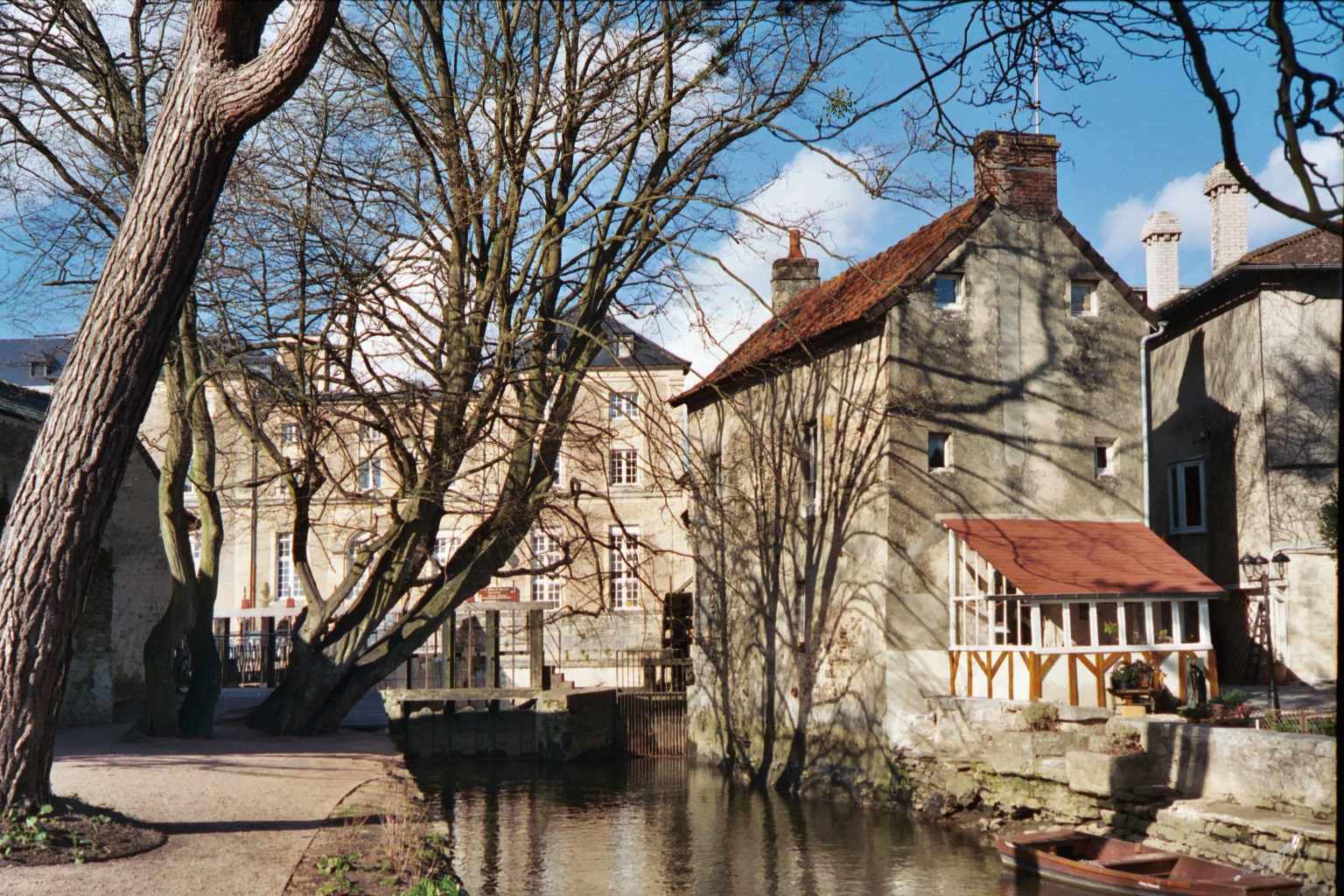
Near the Centre Guillaume le Conquérant

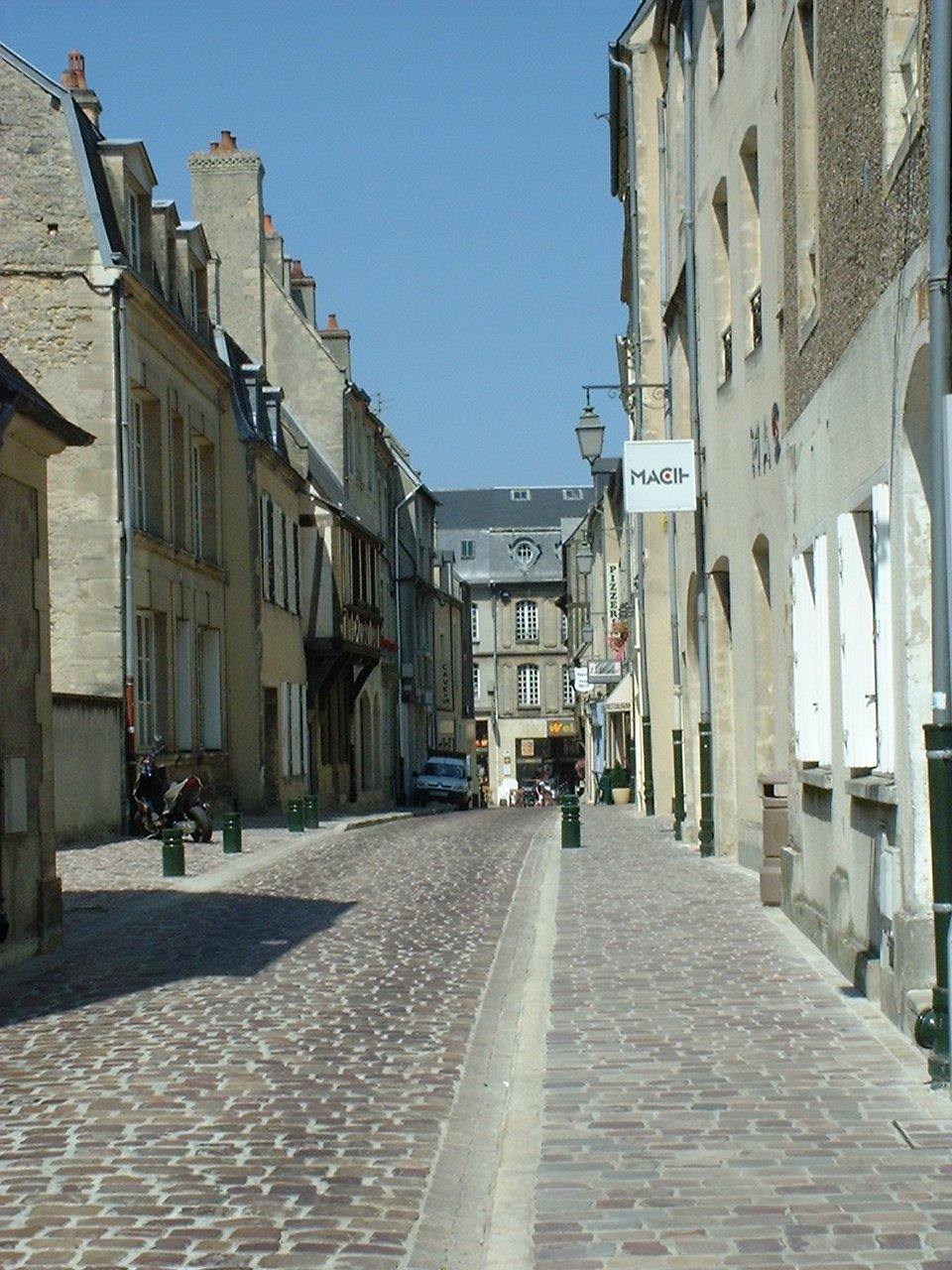
Streets of Bayeux

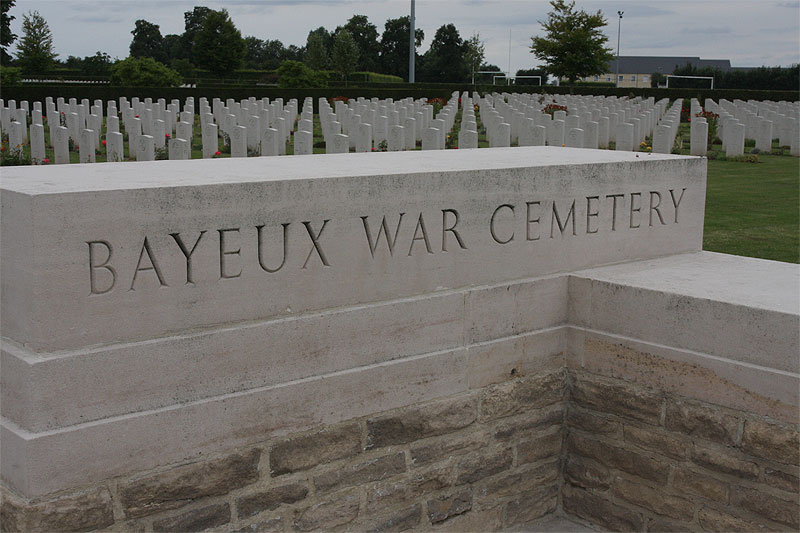
Main entrance to Bayeux War Cemetery

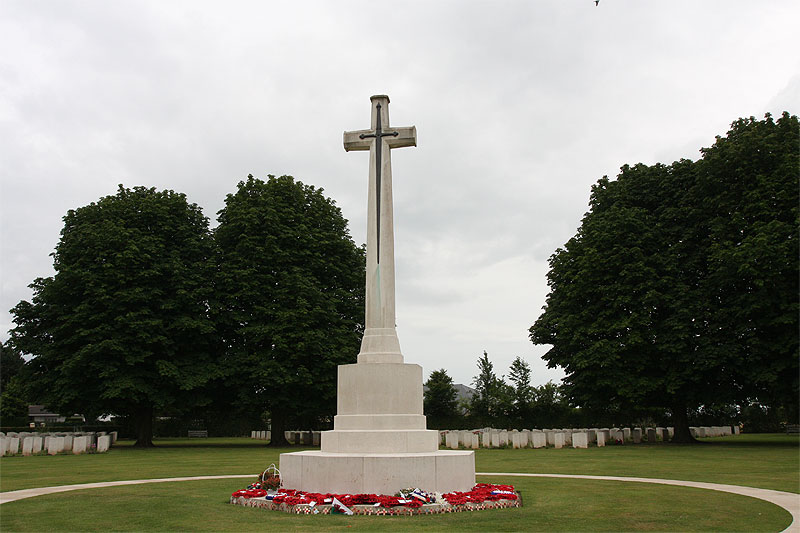
The Cross of Sacrifice in cemetery

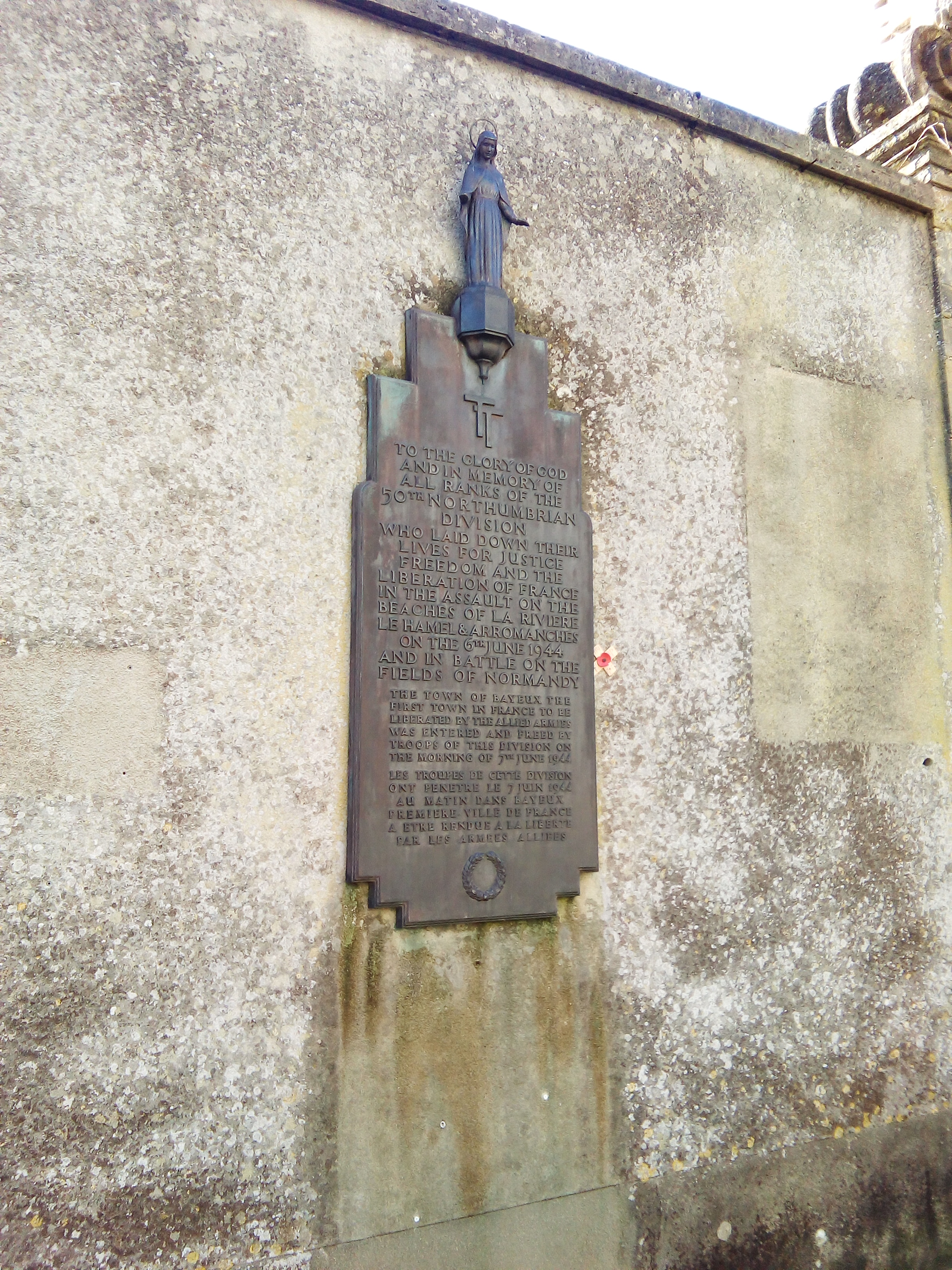
Liberation memorial plaque in Bayeux

== Sport ==
Bayeux has a football club Bayeux FC who play at the Stade Henry-Jeanne.

== Personalities ==
- Muriel Barbery (born 1965), writer
- Berengar II of Neustria (died AD 896), Count of Bayeux
- Roger Bésus (1915–1994), sculptor and writer
- Frédéric Née (born 1975), footballer
- Alain Chartier (1392–1430), politician and poet
- Adrien Closmenil (born 2007), racing driver
- Pierre Du Bosc (1623–1692), preacher
- Franck Dumas (born 1968), footballer and coach Stade Malherbe de Caen
- Jean-Léonce Dupont (born 1955), senator and former mayor
- Arcisse de Caumont (1801–1873), archaeologist, founded the Societé des Antiquaires de Normandy
- François de Caumont (1768–1848), designer and painter
- Miss George (1787–1867), actress and mistress of Napoleon
- Georges Lenepveu (1857–1923), inventor and master glassmaker
- François Gérard (1770–1837), painter and member of Bayeux
- Jean Grémillon (1901–1959), film director
- Joachim Rupalley (1718–1780) painter
- Édouard Lair de Beauvais, (1790–1851), architect
- Alfred Lair de Beauvais (1820–1869), organist and composer
- Robert Lefèvre (1755–1830), painter
- Lionel Lemonchois (born 1960), navigator
- Léon Le Cieux (1821–1873), violinist
- Damien Letulle (born 1973), Olympic archer
- Gabriel-Narcisse Rupalley (1745–1798), painter
- Saint Marcouf (died AD 588), saint born in Bayeux, best known for the healing of scrofula
- Éric Navet (born 1959), jockey
- Poppa of Bayeux, wife of Rollo
- Saint Vigor (died AD 537), bishop of Bayeux from 513 to 537, destroyed a pagan temple in Bayeux
- Kévin Vauquelin (born 2001), professional cyclist
- William the Conqueror (1028-1087), Duke of Normandy, King of England
- Exuperius, (end of 4th century– died c. 410), Archbishop of Toulouse.
- Alfred-Georges Regner (1902–1987), painter-engraver
- Arnauld Mercier (born 1972), footballer and football manager.

== International relations ==
Bayeux is twinned with:

- Dorchester, England
- Lübbecke, Germany
- Chojnice, Poland
- Eindhoven, Netherlands
- Voss, Norway

== Climate ==
Climate data for Bayeux (Vaubadon) (2000–2014 normals, extremes 2000–present)
Month	Jan	Feb	Mar	Apr	May	Jun	Jul	Aug	Sep	Oct	Nov	Dec	Year
Record high °C (°F)	15.0 (59.0)	17.1 (62.8)	20.6 (69.1)	24.8 (76.6)	31.3 (88.3)	32.8 (91.0)	33.7 (92.7)	37.9 (100.2)	32.2 (90.0)	28.1 (82.6)	19.5 (67.1)	16.6 (61.9)	37.9 (100.2)
Mean daily maximum °C (°F)	8.0 (46.4)	8.5 (47.3)	11.1 (52.0)	14.1 (57.4)	16.9 (62.4)	20.2 (68.4)	22.0 (71.6)	22.2 (72.0)	19.9 (67.8)	16.2 (61.2)	11.7 (53.1)	8.4 (47.1)	14.9 (58.8)
Daily mean °C (°F)	5.4 (41.7)	5.6 (42.1)	7.4 (45.3)	9.9 (49.8)	12.6 (54.7)	15.6 (60.1)	17.4 (63.3)	17.6 (63.7)	15.5 (59.9)	12.7 (54.9)	8.8 (47.8)	5.7 (42.3)	11.2 (52.2)
Mean daily minimum °C (°F)	2.8 (37.0)	2.7 (36.9)	3.8 (38.8)	5.6 (42.1)	8.4 (47.1)	11.1 (52.0)	12.8 (55.0)	13.0 (55.4)	11.0 (51.8)	9.2 (48.6)	5.9 (42.6)	3.0 (37.4)	7.4 (45.3)
Record low °C (°F)	−8.6 (16.5)	−10.0 (14.0)	−7.1 (19.2)	−2.8 (27.0)	0.4 (32.7)	3.1 (37.6)	6.2 (43.2)	6.1 (43.0)	3.1 (37.6)	−0.7 (30.7)	−6.3 (20.7)	−7.7 (18.1)	−10.0 (14.0)
Average precipitation mm (inches)	92.9 (3.66)	75.6 (2.98)	73.6 (2.90)	57.4 (2.26)	64.8 (2.55)	60.5 (2.38)	57.5 (2.26)	76.2 (3.00)	55.7 (2.19)	101.3 (3.99)	104.2 (4.10)	104.6 (4.12)	924.3 (36.39)
Average precipitation days (≥ 1.0 mm)	15.9	13.4	12.8	9.7	10.9	8.4	9.4	10.4	8.8	14.0	15.7	16.1	145.5
Source: Meteociel

== See also ==
- Communes of the Calvados department
- Bayeux, Brazil
- Liberation of France
- Roman Catholic Diocese of Bayeux
