= François Habeneck =

French violinist and conductor (1781–1849)

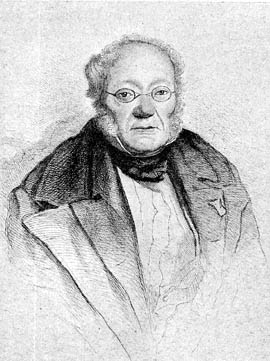
François Antoine Habeneck

François Antoine Habeneck (22 January 1781 – 8 February 1849) was a French classical violinist and conductor.

== Early life ==
Habeneck was born at Mézières, the son of a musician in a French regimental band. During his early youth, Habeneck was taught by his father, and at the age of ten played concertos in public. In 1801, he entered the Conservatoire de Paris, where he studied under Pierre Baillot and obtained the violin first prize in 1804. In the same year, he joined the orchestra of the Opéra-Comique, but shortly afterwards moved to that of the Paris Opera. He conducted student concerts at the Conservatoire from 1806 onwards.

== Career at the Paris Opera ==
On 1 June 1817, Habeneck became an assistant conductor (chef d'orchestre adjoint) of the Paris Opera, a post he held until 1 January 1819, when he was replaced by J.-J. Martin. On 1 April 1820, on a trial basis, Henri Valentino replaced J.-J. Martin as second conductor (deuxième chef d'orchestre, à titre d'essai), but in August, Valentino and Habeneck were jointly designated successors to Rodolphe Kreutzer, the first conductor (premier chef d'orchestre), only to take effect, however, when Kreutzer left that position. In the meantime, on 1 November 1821, Habeneck became the administrative director of the Opera. On 1 December 1824, when Kreutzer retired as the conductor of the orchestra, Habeneck and Valentino became joint First Conductors, and Raphaël de Frédot Duplantys replaced Habeneck as the Opera's administrator. Valentino resigned on 1 June 1831, and Habeneck remained as the sole first conductor until his retirement on 1 November 1846. During that time, he conducted the first performances of, among other operas, Robert le diable, La Juive, Les Huguenots and Benvenuto Cellini.

According to the French music historian Arthur Pougin, Habeneck was initially the conductor responsible for the preparation of Spontini's Olimpie, but at one of the general rehearsals Habeneck and Spontini had a violent quarrel, resulting in Habeneck's dismissal, and Henri Valentino was put in charge of Olimpie.

== Orchestral concerts, compositions, pupils and later years ==
Habeneck became the founding conductor of the Orchestre de la Société des Concerts du Conservatoire in 1828. By means of these concerts, he introduced Beethoven's symphonies into France. He composed two concertos, compositions for the violin, and several songs, but published only a few of his compositions. Among his pupils were Jean-Delphin Alard, Hubert Léonard, Léon Le Cieux and Édouard Lalo. Hector Berlioz, in his memoirs, denounced Habeneck for incompetence in conducting Berlioz's own Requiem. Richard Wagner credits Habeneck with a performance of Beethoven's ninth symphony upon which "the scales fell from my eyes".

=== Richard Wagner and Beethoven's 9th Symphony ===
Wagner arrived in Boulogne, France in August 1839 determined to succeed as a dramatic composer. In advance, Wagner had written to Meyerbeer requesting an interview, and although Meyerbeer had failed to reply, Wagner considered it good fortune to discover that Meyerbeer happened to be staying in Boulogne at the time arrival from England. Subsequently, Wagner called, paid his due respects, and Meyerbeer promised a letter of introduction to both Henri Duponchel, the director of the Opéra, and Habeneck, its chief conductor. Settled in Paris, in September 1839, and fortified with Meyerbeer's letter, Wagner paid a call on both men. Whilst Duponchel dismissed Wagner without emotion, Habeneck received him with 'more than just a perfunctory show of interest' and expressed a willingness to let his orchestra play through a piece of Wagner's at some later date. Unfortunately, Wagner records, the only orchestral piece available was his "strange" Columbus overture which Habeneck graciously accepted to consider. When an opportunity to perform the overture materialised, Habeneck 'dryly, but not without kindness', warned Wagner that the piece was too "vague". Nevertheless, and against Habeneck's good advice, Wagner persevered. Rehearsals with the orchestra went badly, and the actual performance was deemed by Wagner a failure.

Nearly thirty years later, in his 1869 tract On Conducting, Wagner complains that the glaring weaknesses of German orchestras are a direct result of the poor quality of Kapellmeisters in their role as conductors. Reflecting back on the late 1820s when Wagner lived in Leipzig, he recalls that every year the Gewandhaus orchestra performed Beethoven's 9th symphony as a matter of honour, despite it being a piece they couldn't manage. As a teenager Wagner had, in 1831, had made a piano arrangement of the Ninth but the Gewandhaus performances threw him into such doubt and confusion about Beethoven's merit that he temporarily abandoned his own study of the composer. It was not until a performance of the D minor symphony in Paris in late 1839 (or more likely, early 1840) at the hands of the Paris Conservatoire Orchestra conducted by Habeneck that Wagner experienced his Damascene insight into the work's secret. He believed that he had heard the symphony for the first time, and as Beethoven himself had conceived it. Habeneck's success, Wagner stresses, was not attributable to genius, or for that matter conscientious diligence, although Habeneck had spent over two years studying and rehearsing the work, but that Habeneck had "found the right tempo because he took infinite pains to get his orchestra to understand the melos of the symphony, and thus the orchestra had made the work sing. Later that year, in November–December 1840, Wagner published his well-known novella A Pilgrimage to Beethoven (Eine Pilgerfahrt zu Beethoven).

Wagner defines melos as a singing style which shaped melodic phrases with rubato, tonal variation, and shifting accent, and the right comprehension of the melos is the sole guide to the right tempo: these two things are inseparable: the one implies and qualifies the other. After the foundation stone for the Bayreuth Festpielhaus had been laid in May 1872, the assembled throng retired to the Margrave Opera House where Wagner conducted a performance of the D minor symphony. Despite the fact that Wagner had hand-picked the musicians from the best houses in Germany, a number of problems with the clarity of the performance affected Wagner so deeply that he was forced once again to the study of this "marvellous work". The result of the study was the 1873 essay, On Performing Beethoven's Ninth Symphony. Again, and now over forty years since that memorable Paris concert performance, Habeneck's insight was the model for remedying the evil that Wagner had encountered in his own performance.

In my view, clarity depends upon one thing only: the drastic bringing out of the melody. As I have pointed out elsewhere it is easier for French players than for German to penetrate the secret of performing these works: they were reared in the Italian school which regards melody, song, as the essence of all music. If by this means truly committed musicians have found the right way of performing works of Beethoven hitherto considered incomprehensible...we can hope their methods become the norm.

This central thought of Wagner's, derived from Habeneck's inspiring performance, influenced not only conductors in the nineteenth century but also Boulez (who concluded that what Wagner had to say about conducting, was correct and John Barbirolli who articulated that giving the true tempo and finding the work's melos was the key to the conductor in excelcis.

Habeneck died in Paris in 1849.

== Bibliography ==
- Castil-Blaze (1855). L'Académie impériale de musique: histoire littéraire, musicale, politique et galante de ce théâtre, de 1645 à 1855, vol. 2. Paris: Castil-Blaze. Copy at Google Books.
- Macdonald, Hugh (1992). "Habeneck, François-Antoine" in The New Grove Dictionary of Opera, vol 2, p. 590
- Macdonald, Hugh (2001). "Habeneck, François-Antoine" in The New Grove Dictionary of Music and Musicians, 2nd edition, edited by Stanley Sadie. London: Macmillan. ISBN 9781561592395 (hardcover). OCLC 419285866 (eBook).
- Pougin, Arthur (1880). "Valentino (Henri-Justin-Joseph)", pp. 597–598, in Biographie universelle des musiciens et Bibliographie générale de la musique par F.-J. Fétis. Supplément et complément, vol. 2. Paris: Firmin-Didot. View at Google Books.
- Wild, Nicole (1989). Dictionnaire des théâtres parisiens au XIXe siècle: les théâtres et la musique. Paris: Aux Amateurs de livres. ISBN 9780828825863. ISBN 9782905053800 (paperback). View formats and editions at WorldCat.

Preceded by none	Principal conductors, Orchestre de la Société des Concerts du Conservatoire; 1828–1848	Succeeded by Narcisse Girard
