= Opéra bouffon =

French genre of opera buffa (comic opera)

Opéra bouffon (French pronunciation: [ɔpeʁa bufɔ̃]) is the French term for the Italian genre of opera buffa (comic opera) performed in 18th-century France, either in the original language or in French translation. It was also applied to original French opéras comiques having Italianate or near-farcical plots.

The term was also later used by Jacques Offenbach for five of his operettas (Orphée aux enfers, Le pont des soupirs, Geneviève de Brabant, Le roman comique and Le voyage de MM. Dunanan père et fils), and is sometimes confused with the French opéra comique and opéra bouffe.
