= Narcisse Girard =

French violinist, conductor and composer (1797-1860)

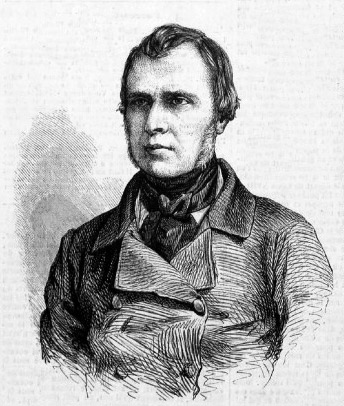

Narcisse Girard (28 January 1797 – 16 January 1860) was a French violinist, conductor and composer.

== Life ==
Girard was born in Nantes. A pupil of Pierre Baillot (violin, winning first prize in 1820), and Anton Reicha (counterpoint) at the Conservatoire, after completing his studies there he went to Italy for a year to further his training. After conducting orchestras at the Hotel de Ville, Girard became the conductor of the Opéra Italien from 1830 to 1832. He was chief conductor at the Opéra Comique from 1837 to 1846, then moving to the Paris Opéra, where he conducted the premieres of Le prophète and Sapho.

On 30 October 1849 Girard conducted Mozart's Requiem as part of the funeral service for Frédéric Chopin.

From 18 October 1848 to 17 January 1860 Girard was the conductor of the Société des Concerts du Conservatoire, leading them in over 100 concerts. Girard conducted the first performance of Harold en Italie by Hector Berlioz at the Salle du Conservatoire on 23 November 1834, with Chrétien Urhan (viola).

Girard was a professor of violin at the Paris Conservatoire where his pupils included Jules Danbé, Charles Lamoureux and Édouard Colonne. See: List of music students by teacher: G to J#Narcisse Girard.

His compositions included an overture Antigone, and short stage works Les deux voleurs and Les dix.

Having already been taken ill during a Conservatoire concert, Girard collapsed while conducting, towards the end of the third act of Les Huguenots at the Opéra. He is buried in Père Lachaise Cemetery.
