= Orchestre de la Société des Concerts du Conservatoire =

French orchestra

The Orchestre de la Société des concerts du Conservatoire (French pronunciation: [ɔʁkɛstʁ də la sɔsjete de kɔ̃sɛʁ dy kɔ̃sɛʁvatwaʁ]) was a symphony orchestra established in Paris in 1828. It gave its first concert on 9 March 1828 with music by Beethoven, Rossini, Meifreid, Rode and Cherubini.

Administered by the philharmonic association of the Conservatoire de Paris, the orchestra consisted of professors of the Conservatoire and their pupils. It was formed by François-Antoine Habeneck in pioneering fashion, aiming to present Beethoven's symphonies, but over time it became more conservative in its programming.

Its long existence kept the tradition of playing taught at the Conservatoire prominent in French musical life. The orchestra occupied the center-stage of French musical life throughout the 19th and most of the 20th centuries. A major tour of the US took place in 1918, appearing in 52 cities. Later that year it made the first of its many recordings.

In 1967, financial difficulties, along with irregular work for the players and poor pay led to a decision by the French government to form a new orchestra. Following auditions chaired by Charles Munch, 108 musicians were chosen (of whom 50 were from the Paris Conservatoire Orchestra) for the newly created Orchestre de Paris, which gave its first concert on 14 November 1967 at the Théâtre des Champs-Élysées.

The chief conductors of the orchestra were:

- François-Antoine Habeneck 1828–1848
- Narcisse Girard 1848–1860
- Théophile Tilmant 1860–1863
- François George-Hainl 1863–1872
- Édouard Deldevez 1872–1885
- Jules Garcin 1885–1892
- Paul Taffanel 1892–1901
- Georges Marty 1901–1908
- André Messager 1908–1919
- Philippe Gaubert 1919–1938
- Charles Munch 1938–1946
- André Cluytens 1946–1960

No principal conductor was appointed during the orchestra's final years 1960–1967.

Notable premieres given by the orchestra include Berlioz's Symphonie fantastique, Saint-Saëns's Cello Concerto No. 1, and Franck's Symphony in D minor.

The Paris Conservatoire Orchestra also made the first recording of Debussy's La mer with conductor Piero Coppola in 1928.
