= Paul LeBlanc (university president) =

President of Marlboro College from 1998 to 2003

Paul J. LeBlanc

5th President of Southern New Hampshire University
- In office 2004–2024
- Preceded by: Richard Gustafson
- Succeeded by: Lisa Marsh Ryerson

7th President of Marlboro College
- In office 1996–2003
- Preceded by: Rod Gander
- Succeeded by: Ellen McCulloch-Lovell

Personal details
- Spouse: Patricia Findlen
- Children: 2
- Education: Framingham State University (BA); Boston College (MA); University of Massachusetts Amherst (PhD)
- Profession: College president

Paul J. LeBlanc is an academic administrator who was president of Marlboro College from 1998 to 2003 and president of Southern New Hampshire University from 2003 to 2024.

== Early life and education ==
Born into a French-speaking family in Canada, LeBlanc's family immigrated to the United States when he was a child. He became the first person in his extended family to attend college. He enrolled at Framingham State University, where he earned his bachelor's degree. He then received his master's degree from Boston College and his Ph.D. from the University of Massachusetts Amherst.

== Professional career ==
From 1993 to 1996, LeBlanc worked for Houghton Mifflin Publishing Company (now Houghton Mifflin Harcourt). He then served as the president of Marlboro College in Marlboro, Vermont from 1996 to 2003. In 2003, LeBlanc became the president of Southern New Hampshire University (SNHU) in Manchester, New Hampshire. LeBlanc is a signatory of the American College & University Presidents' Climate Commitment and the Amethyst Initiative.

In March 2015, LeBlanc embarked on a three-month assignment to serve as a senior advisor to Under Secretary of Education Ted Mitchell. His focus was primarily on how the Department of Education can establish better accrediting standards for competency-based learning and other innovations. The Chronicle of Higher Education describes LeBlanc as a leading advocate of competency-based learning.

For his leadership at SNHU, LeBlanc has been named one of America's Ten Most Innovative College Presidents by Washington Monthly. Forbes has listed him as one of its fifteen "Classroom Revolutionaries" and most influential people in higher education. In 2018, he received the TIAA Institute Theodore M. Hesburgh Award for Leadership Excellence in Higher Education. He is also a recipient of the New Hampshire State Merit Award from the New England Board of Higher Education, as well as the Entrepreneur of the Year Award from the New Hampshire High Tech Council, and was inducted into the New Hampshire Business Review Hall of Fame in 2017.

LeBlanc serves on the American Council on Education's Board of Directors, the National Advisory Committee on Institutional Quality and Integrity (NACIQI), and the National Academies of Sciences, Engineering, and Medicine's Board on Higher Education and Workforce.

In July 2019, LeBlanc was appointed to the board of directors of Chegg, an American education technology company that provides textbook rentals and sells students solutions to their course assignments and exam questions.

In 2016, he was the second highest paid college administrator in New Hampshire with a salary of almost one million dollars.

In December 2023, LeBlanc announced his retirement from Southern New Hampshire University, effective June 2024.

== Personal life ==
LeBlanc and his wife Patricia Findlen have two daughters, Emma and Hannah.
