= Walter F. Hendricks =

Educator

Walter F. Hendricks (1892 – September 29, 1979) was an educator and founder of three colleges in Vermont, all of which would later close. He founded Marlboro College (1946–2020), Windham College (1951–1978), and Mark Hopkins College (1964–1978).

== Early life and academic career ==
Hendricks was born in Chicago and earned his BA from Amherst College in 1917. At Amherst, he was a student of Robert Frost. He later earned a master's degree and doctorate from the University of Chicago. He then served as professor and chair of the English department at Illinois Institute of Technology where he taught for 25 years.

At the end of World War II, he served as director of English at Biarritz American University in France, a temporary college set up for G.I.s awaiting de-mobilization.

== College Presidencies ==
=== Marlboro College (1946–1951) ===
In 1946, he founded Marlboro College in Marlboro, Vermont and the college would open the following year, in fall 1947. Due to his connection with his former professor Robert Frost, Hendricks convinced Frost to serve as a trustee for the new college. He would serve as president there until 1951, dismissed by the board of trustees after accusing a student, a dean, and the local postmaster of being Communists.

=== Windham College (1951–1964) ===
In 1951, he founded Windham College, which was located about 25 miles east and north, in Putney, Vermont. He would serve as president there until 1964, when dissatisfaction at his management and protests by both students and faculty forced him to resign.

=== Mark Hopkins College (1964–1972) ===
Finally, in 1964, he founded his third and final college, Mark Hopkins College, serving as president there until 1972. The main and only administration and classroom building was in a mansion on Route 9 in Brattleboro, Vermont. It was called Gibson Hall, named after the previous owners of the building, Ernest W. Gibson Jr., who served as Governor of Vermont from 1947 to 1950, along with his family.

Mark Hopkins College was accredited by the State of Vermont and authorized to grant bachelor's degrees. However it was never accredited by the New England Commission of Higher Education. It closed in 1978 after an embezzlement scandal.

== Legacy ==
Tom Ragle, who later served as President of Marlboro College, noted that Hendricks was "a promoter and a good, even master teacher - I never heard his most inveterate opponents deny this." However, he continued "Walter was not a good administrator." Similarly, one student, many years later, reflected that Mark Hopkins College failed because Hendricks was a poor manager.
