= Marlboro School =

Public School in Marlboro

Coordinates: 42°52′7″N 72°43′11″W

The Marlboro School is a small public school in Marlboro, Vermont. Marlboro is a member of the Coalition of Essential Schools

Marlboro has an enrollment of 79 students. It is one of six k-8 schools in Vermont with an enrollment of less than 80. Classrooms are all multi-aged, except for kindergarten. The school district does not run a high school and instead pays a certain amount of tuition for town students to attend out-of-town high schools, public or private. Most Marlboro students go on to attend Brattleboro Union High School, the only high school to which transportation is provided, as of early 2008. Starting in the junior-high years, students start thinking about which high school they want to attend, and guidance counselors and principals from nearby high schools come to Marlboro to talk with them and their parents. School visitations are arranged and information on private schools is also made available.

== Assessment controversy and alternative assessment planning ==
=== Standardized testing controversy ===
Parents and officials at the school, with the support of the school board, have challenged the state over standardized tests. In about 2005, the school decided not to administer the tests as required by the federal education law. After a visit from the state education commissioner, who threatened to revoke the licenses of the principal and superintendent, the school relented. But in early 2007, only 92 percent of eligible children at the school took the tests when many parents withheld their children from school during the testing. The federal No Child Left Behind Act requires schools to have at least 95 percent attendance when the tests are taken, so Marlboro was put on the state's list of schools that did not make adequate yearly progress. The school district has a policy allowing parents to refuse to have their children take the standardized tests.

=== Marlboro Realms of Learning and portfolios ===
In developing a school assessment plan, school officials identified "Realms of Learning" to "guide our instruction, focus student learning, and provide the broad palette used to assess how students are progressing", according to the school Web site. The areas identified as of early 2008:

- Communication
- Problem Solving
- Personal Development
- Civic and Social Responsibility
- Knowledge (knowledge and understanding, application of knowledge, making connections)

Portfolios of student work are kept as part of the school assessment plan. Students help select the portfolio pieces, and older students organize their portfolios by "learning realm". The portfolios are used to share student work with parents during conferences. Eighth grade students must present a completed portfolio to a panel consisting of their teachers, the principal, and another teacher as part of the school's graduation requirements.

== Academics and other learning ==
=== Library ===
The Marlboro School Library offers a wide selection that varies from research material to picture books to leisurely young adult reading. Every week, each classroom has a class with the librarian where they learn more about computers and internet, or listen to books. The library has a computer lab where students go to do research or type their homework. Each classroom also has a selection of computers that offer the same applications.

=== Performance ===
Marlboro students put on several regular shows each year. The Holiday concert, a show that’s been around for generations, includes singing, sword dancing, morris dancing, and plays put on by the different grades, K-8. Another performance that has been around for a while is the Poetry Reading or "Paper Feelings". Each student in the school writes a poem; all are put into a book and read aloud. The Art Show includes all of the work that students have made with the art teacher over the year as well as singing, guitar performances, and a performance by the school’s musical band. We also show or perform what we did over Winter Workshops. One of the most common performances is the Cabaret. The Junior High puts on a series of different skits at Marlboro College's Whittimore Theater.

=== Specials ===
Marlboro School’s Specials include Art, Music, and Gym. In Art class we paint, print with paint, make collages, do self-portraits, sculpt, draw/sketch, and make books. In Music we sing songs, learn different dances and play guitar and other instruments. In Gym we enjoy ourselves by playing soccer, basketball, dodge ball, kick ball, hockey, and other games.

=== Field Research ===
Field research has been integral to the Marlboro School curriculum since the 1960s. The school thinks that field trips are a great way for kids to experience things and be engaged. Between kindergarten and fourth grade, most of the field trips are small and local, with students going to places like Magic Wings, the Post Office and various farms to learn about things outside of the classroom. In fifth and sixth grades they start to go on longer and farther, and beforehand do more in-depth research. They go on week-long trips to New York City and Cape Cod. They complete a program called Applewoods, where they create a field guide to a 3 by 3m area. They also take a trip to Woodford State Park and a "get to know each other" trip. They finish eighth grade having gone to Washington, D.C. and Costa Rica. They also climb either Mount Chocorua or Mount Mansfield in the beginning of the year. Students take part in grant writing and fund raising. With the help of a local coffee roster, students sell fair trade coffee to raise funds for the Costa Rica expeditions.

== Extracurricular activities ==
=== Recess ===
During recess, from 11:30 a.m. to 12:00 p.m., students may build forts in the woods, climb marked climbing trees, swing, play wallball or teatherball, play sports on the soccer field, or play 4 square, hopscotch, or basketball on the blacktop. In the winter supervised sledding and snowball fights are allowed on the soccer field and down the hill in the woods. The boundaries are marked by large red Xs and are shown to the children before they begin their first recess. Teachers switch recess duty daily.

=== Winter Sports ===
Marlboro school's winter sports program is designed to teach kids skiing, skating and snowboarding. Anyone from age seven and up has the choice to ski but any age under seven must skate. The program is perfect for any skill level; there are different groups from beginners to advanced. Originally, downhill skiing took place at Marlboro’s Hogback Mountain (Vermont) Ski Area until its closure in 1986. Students who preferred cross-country skiing would instead travel to neighboring Wilmington, Vermont. Today skiing and snowboarding is done at nearby Mount Snow. The Ski and Skate program is for all ages.

=== After School ===
The Marlboro After School Program (MASP) for students in the first through sixth grades runs from 3 p.m. to 6 p.m. after school and also operates on some days when school is not in session. Participants have a variety of activities and a quiet period at the end of each day where older children can do homework.

== Windmill proposal ==
The school received a $35,520 grant from the state to put up a windmill, but despite the fact that the school was built close to a mountaintop, research showed in 2005 that there wasn't enough wind to actually make installation of the turbine worthwhile. The school used an anemometer, obtained with the help of Vermont Technical College, to measure the speed and quality of the wind for two months. The eastern slope of the mountain, where the school sits, and nearby trees apparently prevented winds from reaching higher than 10 mph during the testing. The wind also shifts too much to make the site useful for a turbine, and only reached an average of 7.9 mph. The school district gave the grant money back to the state.
