= Southern Vermont Natural History Museum =

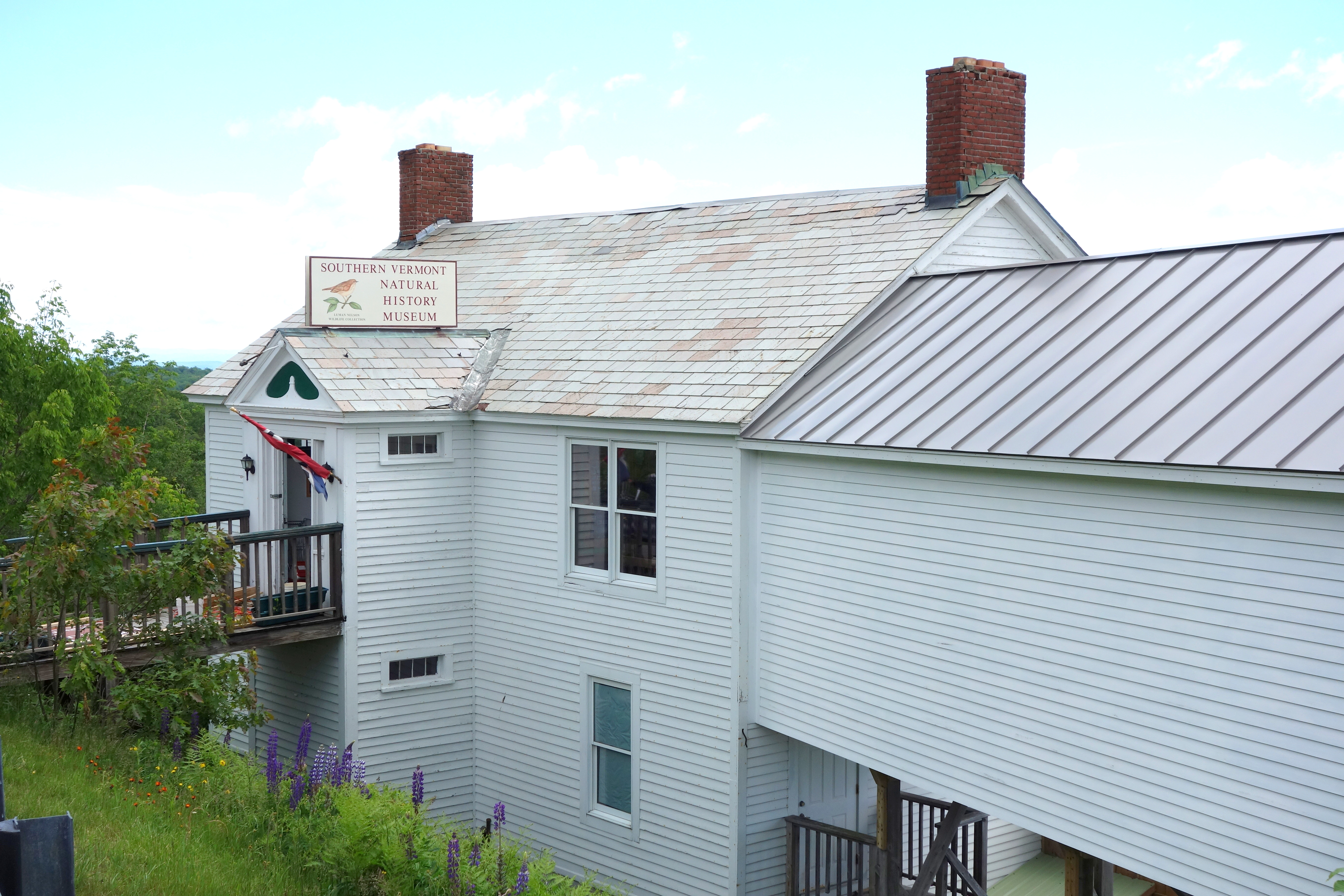
- Established: 1996
- Location: 7599 VT Route 9 Marlboro, Vermont, USA
- Coordinates: 42.861049°N 72.763871°W
- Type: Natural history
- Website: www.vermontmuseum.org

The Southern Vermont Natural History Museum is a natural history museum, at the Hogback Mountain Scenic Overlook on Route 9 in West Marlboro, Vermont. The museum is surrounded by the Hogback Mountain Conservation Area, over 600 acres of protected forest land, with views of three states. The Museum was established in 1996 around the Luman Ranger Nelson Natural History Collection, one of the largest collections of native birds and mammals in the northeast, with 250 species represented.

The museum's founder Ed Metcalfe intended the museum to serve as an educational resource for local communities and visitors to the area. Exhibits are focused on a taxidermy collection but also include a variety of small hands-on exhibits for children, a mineralogy exhibit and a variety of native live animals.

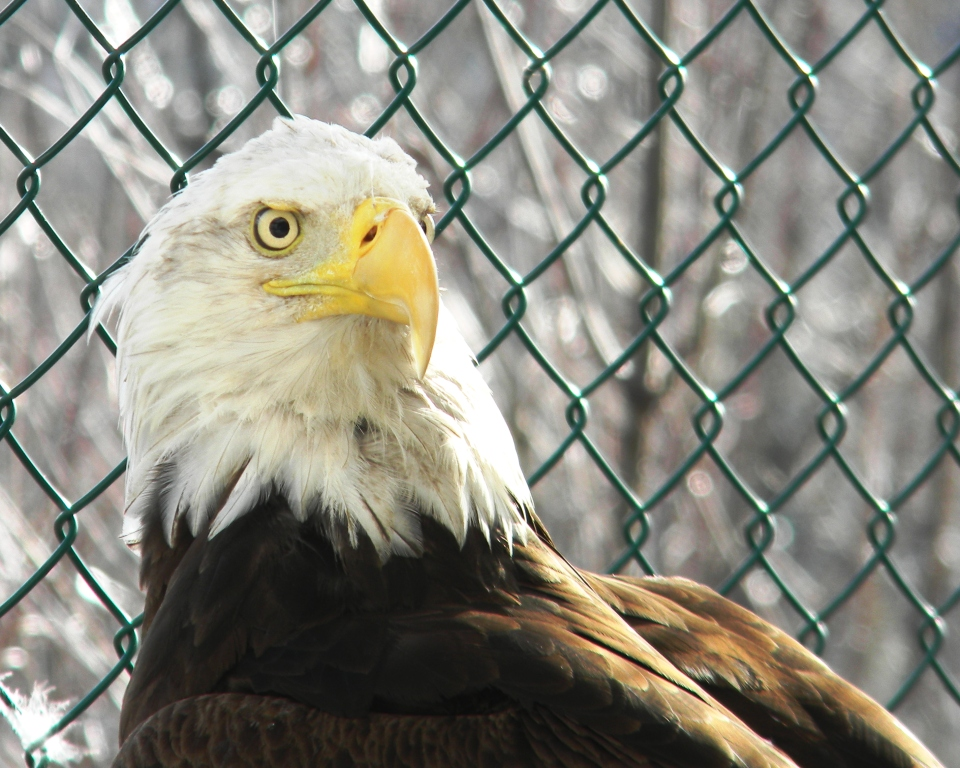
all of the live animals are non-releasable due mostly to physical handicaps

The Museum presents a variety of natural history and environmental science programs throughout central New England, western New York and Vermont.

== Live animals ==
Live animals were first brought to the Museum in 1998 with the establishment of a small raptor center for birds under rehabilitation, and a live trout tank and painted turtle exhibit were established. Other animal exhibits were created, and in 2013 a large bald eagle enclosure was built and the first of two resident eagles arrived.

Most of the native wildlife at the museum were injured and cannot be released back into the wild. As of winter 2015 the Museum exhibits a bald eagle, red-tailed hawk, red-shouldered hawk, American kestrel, screech owl, Northern saw-whet owl, barred owl, king snake, corn snake, black rat snake, painted turtle, wood turtle, box turtle, snapping turtle, wood frog, tarantula, hissing cockroaches, trout and warm water fish. A raven and domestic rabbit live off-site and are used for educational programs.

== Collection ==
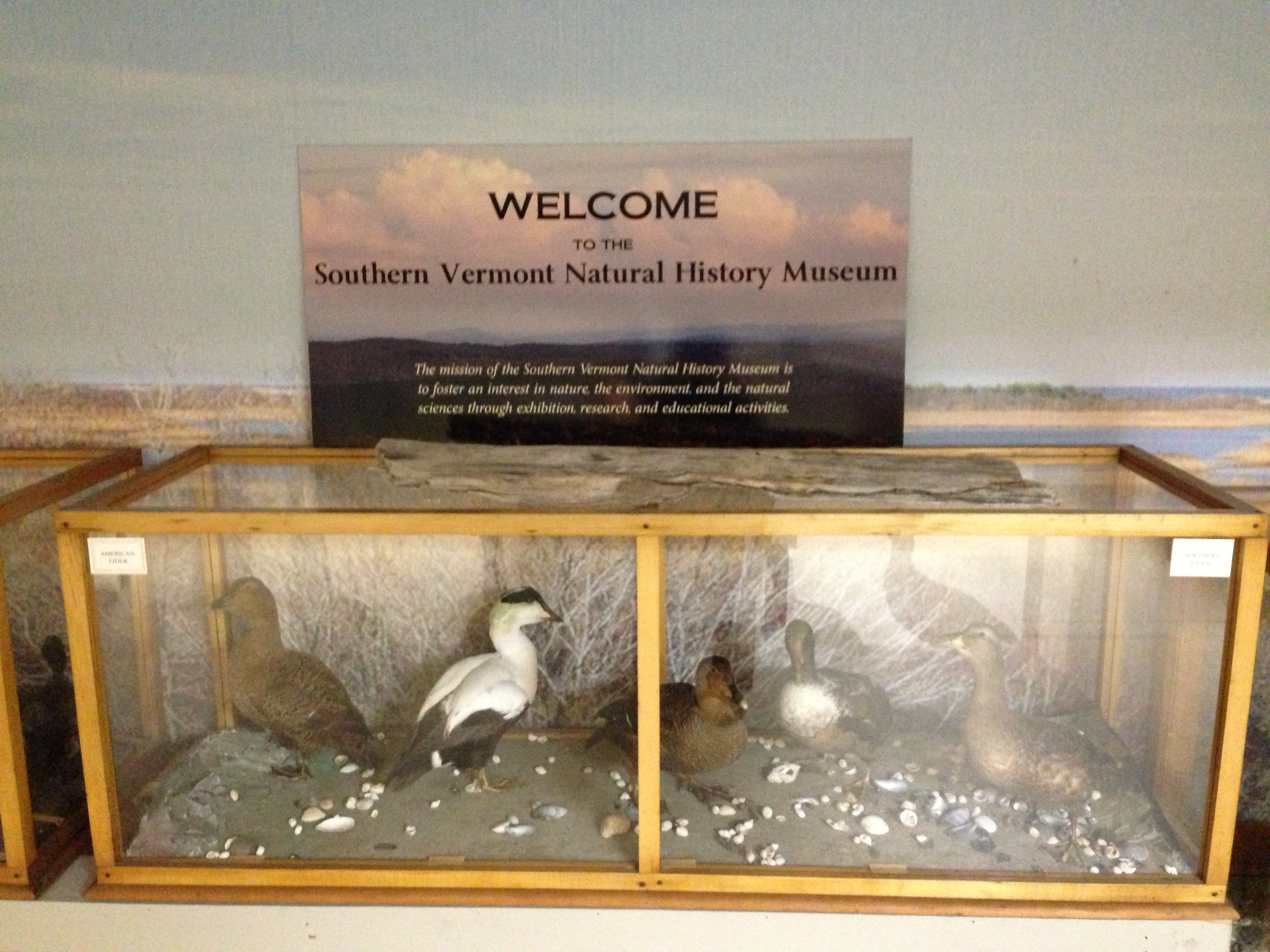
An exhibit in the museum

The Museum's natural history collection is primarily the work of Luman Ranger Nelson, a naturalist and taxidermist of the early 1900s. The collection includes nearly 250 species of bird and mammal found in the northeastern United States, and over 600 individual mounts. It is the largest collection of its kind in Vermont and one of the largest in the region. The collection includes a number of threatened and endangered species, many albino specimens as well as three extinct northeastern birds.

Nelson was born in 1874 in Bernardston, Massachusetts. As an adult, he lived in Winchester, New Hampshire until his death in 1966. In his late 1930s he assembled a collection of northeastern birds and mammals. When the collection began there were very few regulations to limit shooting of wild animals. This is no longer the case, and by the end of his life, Nelson had acquired a number of special permits allowing him to complete the collection. Today, a collection like this would be difficult to create. Although individual specimens were acquired earlier or later in his life, the bulk of this work was done in the 1920s and 1930s.

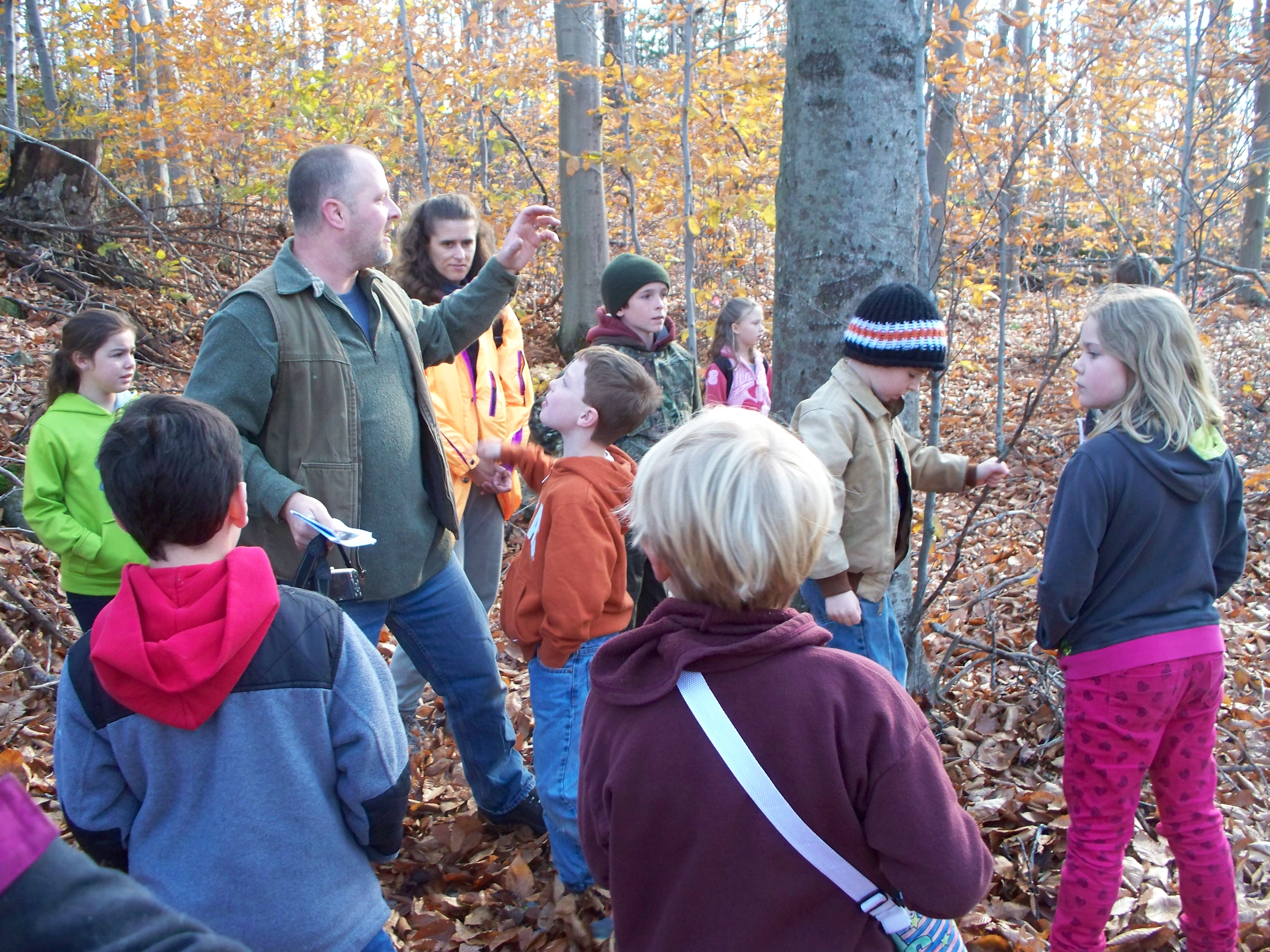
museum staff lead hikes on the adjacent conservation area or off-site

== See also ==
- List of historical societies in Vermont
