= Marlboro College =

Private coeducational liberal arts college in Marlboro, Vermont

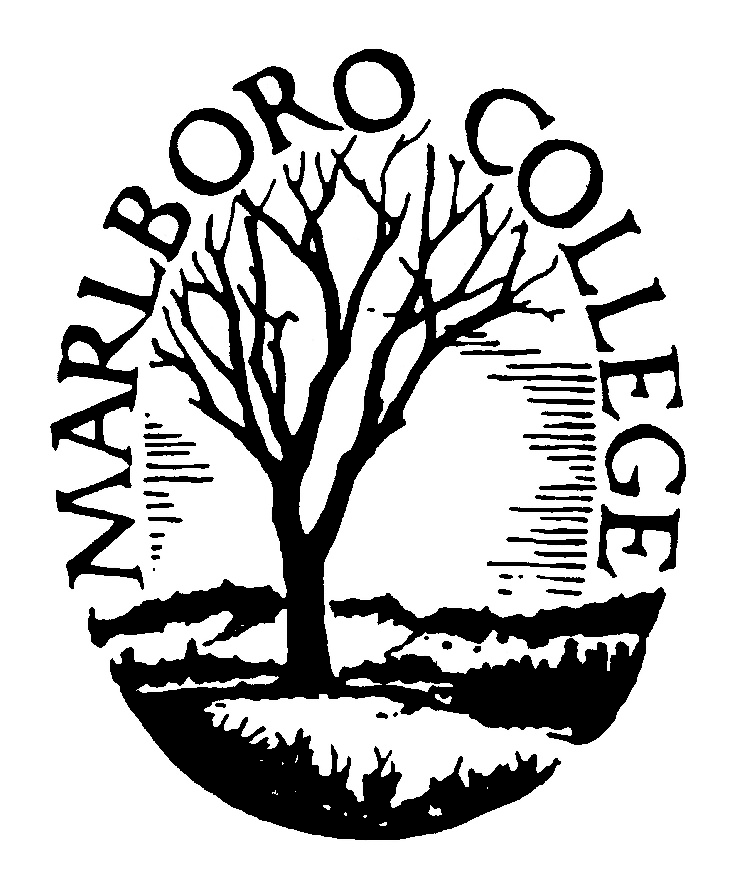
- Type: Private college
- Active: 1946–2020
- Location: Marlboro, Vermont, United States; 42°50′21″N 72°44′07″W
- Campus: Rural: 360 acres (1.5 km^{2})
- Website: www.marlboro.edu

Marlboro College was a private college located in Marlboro, Vermont. Established in 1946, the institution maintained a deliberately small enrollment and operated as a self-governing academic community. Its educational model emphasized individualized learning, allowing students to design their own degree plans, typically culminating in a senior thesis. In 1998, the college expanded its offerings by establishing a graduate school.

Marlboro College ceased operations at the end of the 2019–2020 academic year. Its remaining endowment and academic legacy were transferred to Emerson College in Boston, Massachusetts, leading to the creation of the Marlboro Institute of Liberal Arts and Interdisciplinary Studies at Emerson.

== History ==
Marlboro College was founded in 1946 by Walter F. Hendricks, who had been inspired by his time as director of English at Biarritz American University. Hendricks led the college for five years, until 1951, but would leave after a dispute with the trustees. He founded Windham College that same year.

Many of the first students were returning World War II veterans. The campus incorporated the buildings of three farms that were on the site at Potash Hill. The first students were primarily freshmen but included some sophomores and juniors and one senior, Hugh Mulligan, who in 1948 became the first Marlboro graduate. The students made "How Are Things At Casserole College?" the first school song in response to the dining hall menu.

In 2012, Marlboro instituted the Beautiful Minds Challenge, an essay contest for high school students with full or partial scholarships and other awards as prizes. Essays could take the form of text, images, audio, or video and were judged by Marlboro faculty, staff, and students; finalists were flown to the Marlboro campus for a symposium where they presented their work. The program was discontinued after the 2018 competition. The Renaissance Scholars program, instituted in 2015 with the objective of attracting new students from every state and increasing diversity, caused a rise in enrollment to approximately 200 in fall 2016.

The college remained intentionally small; in 2017 it was one of only three liberal arts colleges listed by U.S. News & World Report where all classes had fewer than 20 students.

=== Merger ===
In 2018, Marlboro's small size and dwindling enrollment led the Board of Trustees to begin exploring merging with another college or university. In 2019, a merger with the University of Bridgeport was announced and then called off.

Later that year, the college announced that it would merge with Emerson College at the end of the 2019–20 academic year. Under the agreement, finalized on July 23, 2020, Marlboro gave its endowment to Emerson, which created the Marlboro Institute of Liberal Arts and Interdisciplinary Studies. Marlboro students were guaranteed admission and tenure-track faculty were guaranteed teaching positions at Emerson. At the time of its closure, Marlboro had approximately 150 students.

== Academics ==
=== Undergraduate ===
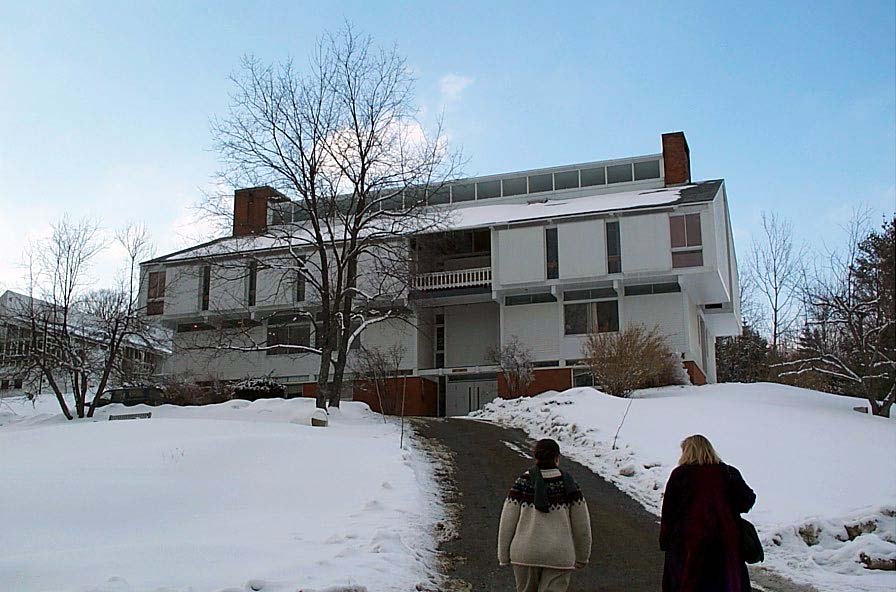
Library

Freshmen were required to meet the "Clear Writing Requirement" by submitting an acceptable portfolio of at least 20 pages (4,000 words) of nonfiction writing to the English Committee.

With the guidance of professors, juniors and seniors developed and followed an individualized "Plan of Concentration", often interdisciplinary, of which at least 20% was required to consist of an independent project prepared without direct faculty input; most students' plans culminated in a thesis. Students defended their work in an oral examination before one or more Marlboro faculty members and an outside evaluator unconnected to the college but with expertise in the student's field of study.

Marlboro's strengths included Asian studies, religion and theology, and life sciences.

In March 2014, Marlboro and five nearby colleges, Community College of Vermont, Landmark College, the School for International Training, Union Institute, and Vermont Technical College, formed the Windham Higher Education Cooperative, allowing students to take one course a semester at another participating institution.

=== Graduate ===
Marlboro College Graduate and Professional Studies began in 1998. Primarily aimed at working professionals and focused on technology, in 2010 it shifted to programs focused on socially responsible management and master's studies in teaching (teaching with technology, teaching for social justice, and TESOL). later added an accelerated Master's track open to undergraduates in some programs.

The graduate school was initially located in nearby Brattleboro. It moved to the main college campus in Marlboro in April 2017, and after that offered courses increasingly online and instituted a teach-out. Enrollment was suspended for 2019–20 and graduate programs were not transferred to Emerson under the merger agreement.

=== Rankings and reputation ===
In The Princeton Review's 2014 annual college guide, Marlboro College received the highest possible academic rating of 99 and was ranked #1 nationally for the quality of its faculty. In 2017, U.S. News & World Report ranked it #117 among liberal arts colleges in the United States.

In 2006 Loren Pope wrote in Colleges That Change Lives that "the Marlboro adventure" was "far more intense and intellectually demanding than Harvard, any other Ivy, or Ivy clone".

== Student life and governance ==
Marlboro was founded on an ethos of independence combined with community participation. Students, faculty, and staff made decisions together in weekly "Town Meetings", and there was an elected community court. Students, faculty, and staff served on elected committees that played a role in hiring decisions and steering the curriculum. All campus buildings were open 24/7, and the library used a self-checkout honor system.

During spring and fall, students were encouraged to work regularly on the school farm. Campuswide Work Days took place each semester, with students, faculty, and staff working together on projects as needed, in the spirit of the first class, who built their own dormitories.

The administration published a magazine called Potash Hill. The student newspaper, The Citizen, and the Marlboro College Literary Magazine were edited by students elected at Town Meetings.

Open mic nights at the Campus Center happened several times a semester in addition to events including the Drag Ball, MayFest, and Apple Days, and other events. The night before writing portfolios were due, a "Midnight Breakfast" was held.

The college had few organized sports teams, but the "Outdoor Program" promoted rock climbing, snowshoeing, cross-country skiing, white-water kayaking, caving, canoeing, and hiking, and college was only 15 miles from the Mount Snow ski resort. A broomball tournament was held every February beginning in 1990.

== Campus ==
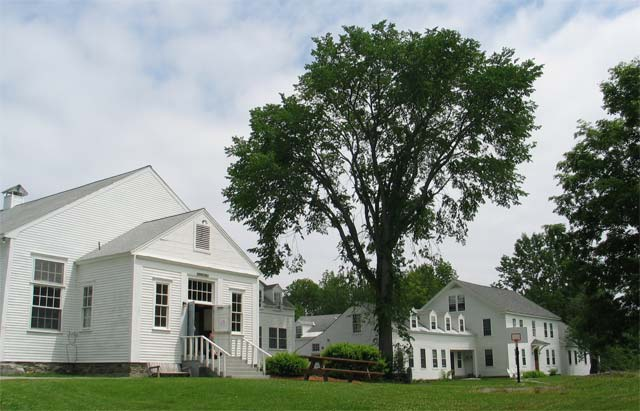
Dining hall and Mather Building

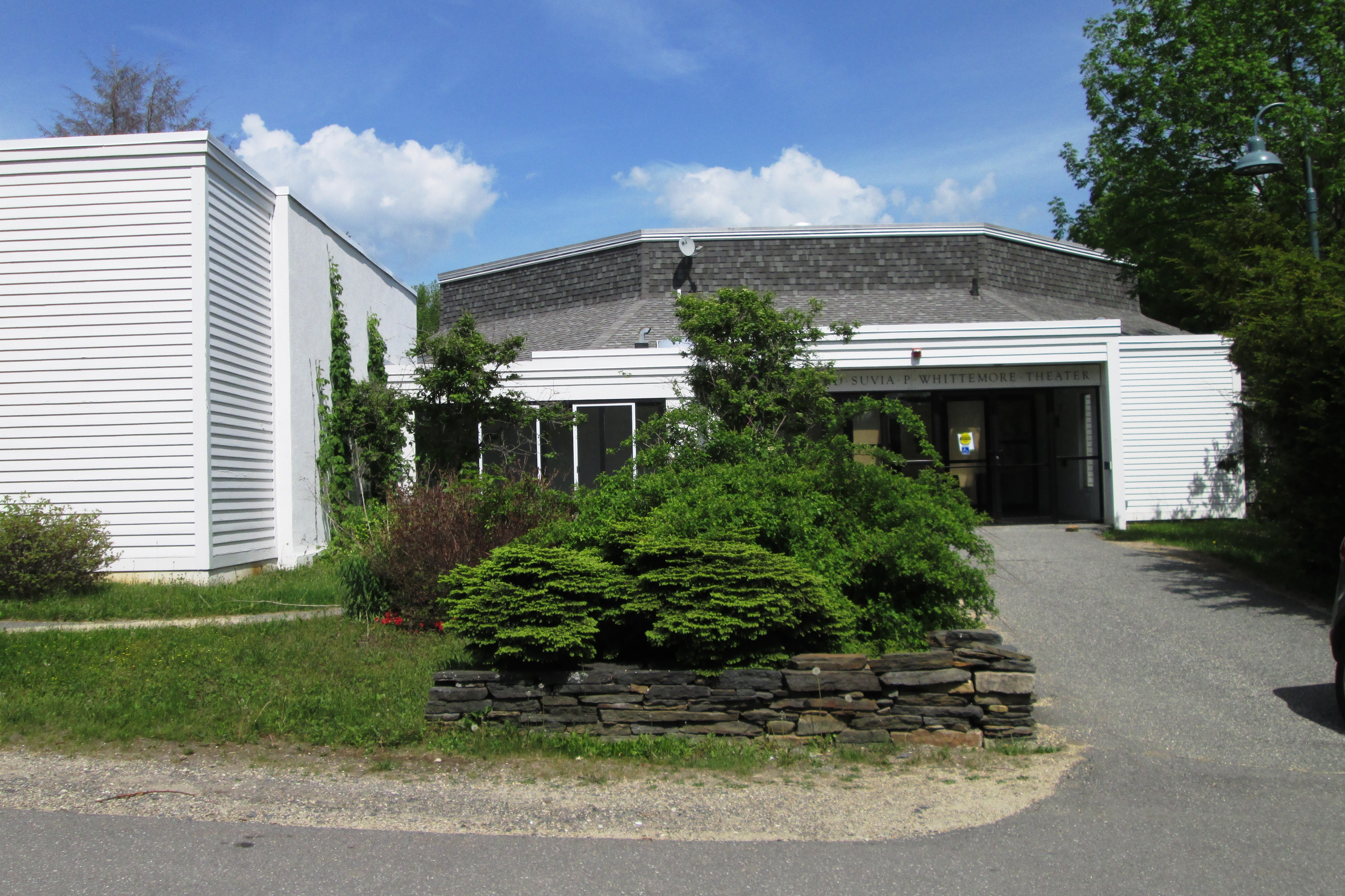
Whittemore Theater and Drury Gallery

The Marlboro College campus is located on South Road in the town of Marlboro, Vermont, in the Green Mountains. In the early years of the college, students and faculty worked together to adapt the buildings of three farms on the site, which became the main classroom building, the dining hall, and the admissions and administration buildings.

Through grants from federal, state and private entities, the college improved the energy efficiency of the Dining Hall, Dalrymple classroom building, Mather administration building, and Admissions building since 2008, as well as the student residences. In summer 2011, the half-circle driveway at the campus entrance was converted to green space and walking paths.

The Serkin Performing Arts Center has a 125-seat auditorium, an electronic music lab, practice rooms with baby grand pianos and a 5,000-square foot dance studio. Whittemore Theater, used primarily by the Theater department, was attached to Drury Gallery, which displayed student works.

The Snyder Center for the Visual Arts, housing studios, classrooms, and gallery spaces in 14,000 square feet, opened in May 2016.

In the summer, the campus is the location of the Marlboro Music Festival, founded in 1951. A new 99-year lease was signed in February 2019 and a residence hall and the Jerome and Celia Reich Building, containing a music library and chamber music rehearsal spaces, are scheduled for completion in 2021.

=== Sale ===
The former Marlboro campus was sold in May 2020 to Democracy Builders, founded by Seth Andrew, which intended to use it for a low-residency, low-cost college program for low-income students. The Degrees of Freedom program would last four years, from eleventh grade to the second year of college, and would result in an associate degree. The program was slated to be largely online, with students only being on campus two weeks out of each trimester.

In February 2021, Andrew announced that Democracy Builders had sold the campus to "Type 1 Civilization Academy" via a quitclaim deed. On March 9, 2021, During an invitation-only community meeting on Zoom, Andrew announced that the Type 1 deal had been cancelled. He called the agreement "an engagement" rather than "a marriage". Andrew filed another quit claim deed which transferred the property back to Democracy Builders. The principal of Type 1, Adrian Stein, said that Type 1 was legitimately in control of the campus and that the issue will likely end up in court unless they can find "some other kind of equitable settlement."

Opening of the Democracy Builders program was deferred in April 2021 after Andrew was charged with financial crimes.

In July 2021, the campus was purchased by the Marlboro Music Festival. The Marlboro Music Festival formed the subsidiary nonprofit organization, Potash Hill, Inc. to manage the property.

== Notable people ==
=== Presidents ===
1. Walter F. Hendricks (1946–1951)
2. Dave Lovejoy (1951–1953)
3. Paul Zens (1953–1957)
4. Roland Boden (1957–1958; acting)
5. Tom Ragle (1958–1981)
6. Rod Gander (1981–1996)
7. Paul LeBlanc (1996–2003)
8. Ellen McCulloch-Lovell (2003–2014)
9. Kevin F. F. Quigley (2015–2020)

=== Faculty ===
- Wyn Cooper
- Jay Craven
- Paul J. LeBlanc, later became president of Southern New Hampshire University.
- Peter Lefcourt, literature and writing (1968-1970)
- Leslie Lamport (1960s)
- David Mamet (one semester)
- Joseph Mazur, mathematics
- Blanche Honegger Moyse, music
- Louis Moyse, music

=== Alumni ===
- David Asman, The Wall Street Journal editor, television journalist
- Shura Baryshnikov, dancer
- Deni Ellis Béchard, novelist
- Sophie Cabot Black, poet
- Regina Lee Blaszczyk, academic
- Sara Coffey, member of the Vermont House of Representatives
- Sean Cole, journalist
- Alicia Dana, Paralympian
- Marcus DeSieno, lens-based artist
- Deborah Eisenberg, author (left after two years)
- Ed Fallon, member of the Iowa House of Representatives
- Gretchen Gerzina, author and academic
- Harold Grinspoon, real estate developer and philanthropist
- Daniel Harple, entrepreneur and investor
- Parnell Hall, novelist
- Joshua Harmon, poet, novelist, and essayist
- Geoffrey Holt, philanthropist
- Emilie Kornheiser, member of the Vermont House of Representatives
- Ted Levine, actor
- Robert H. MacArthur, ecologist
- Arthur Magida, author and journalist
- Cate Marvin, poet
- Jonathan Maslow, journalist and author
- William D. Mundell, poet
- Chris Noth, actor
- David Rhodes, novelist
- Hans Rickheit, cartoonist (left after one year)
- Tristan Roberts, member of the Vermont House of Representatives
- Eneriko Seruma, poet and novelist
- Jock Sturges, portrait photographer
- Tristan Toleno, member of the Vermont House of Representatives
- Charlotte Watts, mathematician, epidemiologist, and academic

=== Staff ===
- Robert Frost, poet, was the college's first trustee and former teacher of the college's founder, Walter Hendricks
- Ethan Gilsdorf, author, worked in the marketing department in the late 1990s

== See also ==
- List of colleges and universities in Vermont
