= Hogback Mountain (Vermont) =

Mountain in Vermont, United States

- Location within Vermont

Highest point
- Elevation: 2,410 ft (730 m)
- Prominence: 374 ft (114 m)
- Listing: Mountains of Vermont
- Coordinates: 42°52′01″N 072°47′15″W

Geography
- Country: United States
- State: Vermont
- County: Windham
- Town: Marlboro
- Parent range: Green Mountains
- Topo map: Jacksonville

Hogback Mountain is a mountain in southern Vermont, United States, in the town of Marlboro, Vermont, just north of Vermont Route 9. Its main peak is 2,409 feet (734 m) high. The area is well known for expansive views from Route 9.

Hogback Mountain Ski Area was located across Route 9 on Mount Olga and relied exclusively on T-bars for ascent. It operated from 1946 to 1986, using only natural snow, and blamed the cost of insurance for causing it to close. Countless local children learned to ski at the ski area, especially because free skiing was offered weekly to students from the nearby Marlboro School for years.

Roughly 590 acres (2.4 km^{2}) was purchased and given to the town of Marlboro as conservation land, known as Hogback Mountain Conservation Area. Some of the old ski lifts remain on the property, along with various buildings, including a fire lookout tower. Trails are semi-clear, as volunteers continue to keep some open and available to cross country skiers, backcountry skiers, hikers, and snowshoers.

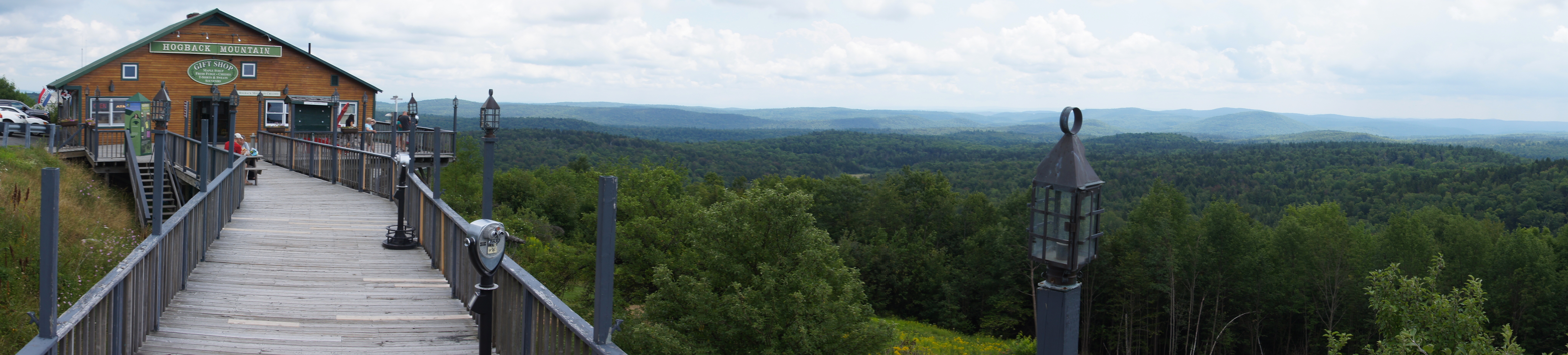
View from Hogback Mountain Gift Shop along Route 9, Vermont, USA
