= Sophie Cabot Black =

American poet (born 1958)

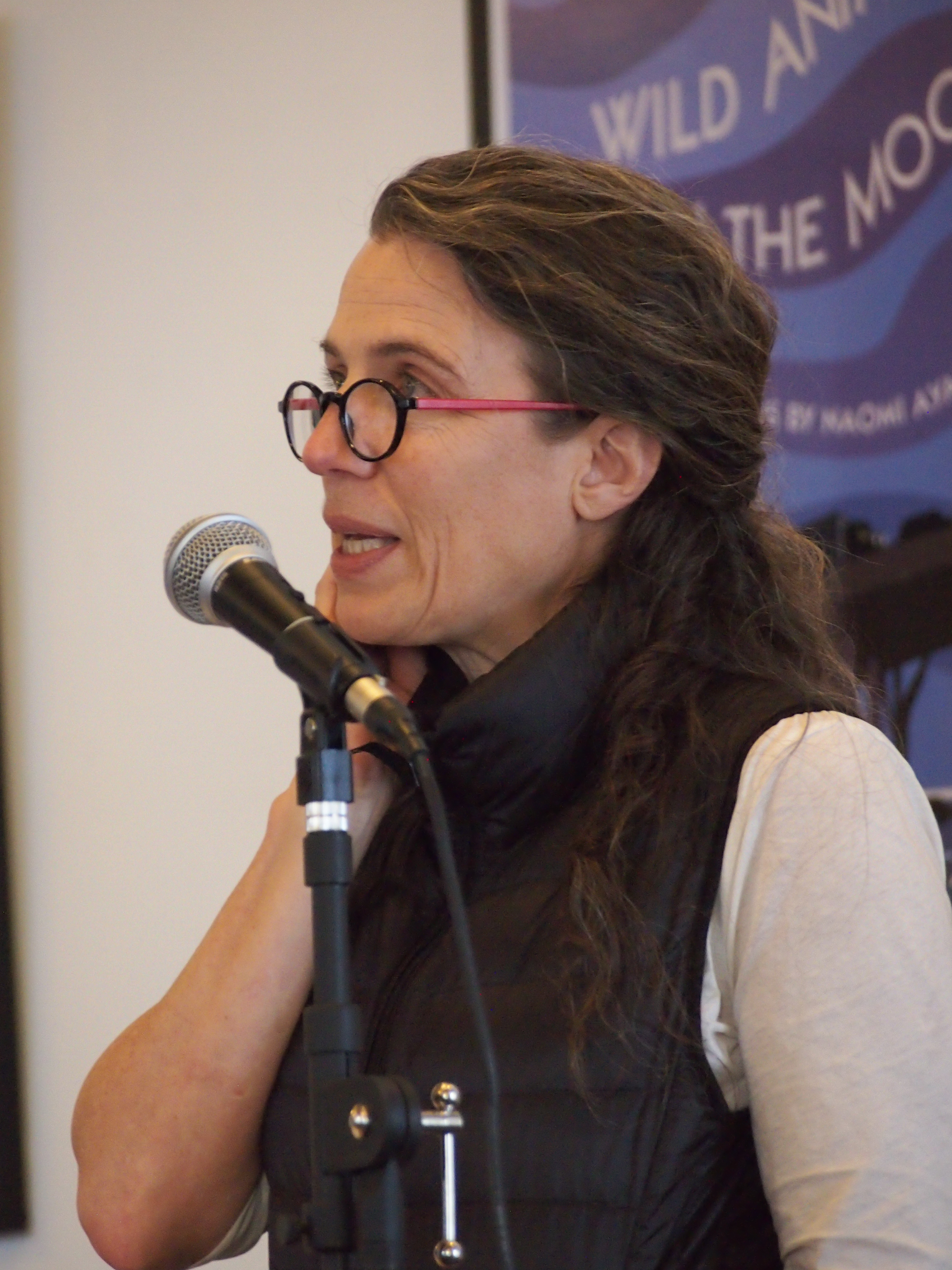
- Sophie Cabot Black, is an American prize winning poet.
- Born: April 18, 1958 (age 68); New York, New York, U.S.
- Education: Marlboro College (BA); Columbia University (MFA)
- Parent(s): David Black; Linda Cabot Black

Sophie Cabot Black (born April 18, 1958) is an American prize-winning poet who has taught creative writing at Columbia University.

== Early life ==
Cabot was born in New York, New York and raised on a small farm in Wilton, Connecticut. Her father is David Goldmark Black (b. 1931), a Broadway producer, actor, teacher, writer and artistic director. Her mother is Linda (Cabot) Black, cofounder of Opera Company of Boston and Opera New England. She has two siblings: actor Jeremy Black, who appeared as the boy Hitler clones in Boys from Brazil, and Alexander Black. She also has two daughters. Her maternal great-grandfather was industrialist and philanthropist Godfrey Lowell Cabot.

In 1980, Black received her Bachelor of Arts from Marlboro College. In 1984, she graduated from Columbia University with a Master of Fine Arts.

== Ancestry ==
Cabot family coat of arms

Sophie Cabot Black is part of the Cabot family of the Boston Brahmin also known as the "first families of Boston."

The status of the Cabot family is hinted from the widely known toast given in 1910 at a College of the Holy Cross alumni dinner: "Here's to dear old Boston, The home of the bean and the cod, Where Lowells speak only to Cabots, And Cabots speak only to God."

- John Cabot (b. 1680 in the Isle of Jersey)
  - Joseph Cabot (b. 1720 in Salem, Province of Massachusetts Bay)
    - Samuel Cabot (b. 1758 in Salem, Province of Massachusetts Bay)
      - Samuel Cabot Jr. (b. 1784 in Boston, Massachusetts, U.S.)
        - Dr. Samuel Cabot III (b. 1815 in Boston, Massachusetts, U.S.)
          - Godfrey Lowell Cabot (b. 1861 in Boston, Massachusetts, U.S.)
            - Thomas Dudley Cabot (b. 1897 in Cambridge, Massachusetts, U.S.)
              - Linda Cabot Black
                - Sophie Cabot Black (b. 1958 in the City of New York, New York, U.S.)

== Career ==
Black's poetry has appeared in publications including AGNI, The Atlantic Monthly, Boston Review, The Paris Review, Poetry, Fence, APR, Bomb, The New Yorker, and The New Republic. Various anthologies have also included her work, such as More Light: Father & Daughter Poems, The Best American Poetry 1993 (edited by Louise Glück), and Looking for Home: Women in Exile.

Black's translations of Latin American poets have been included in the anthologies You Can't Drown the Fire and Twentieth-Century Latin American Poetry: A Bilingual Anthology.

Her essays appear in Wanting a Child and First Loves. One of her poems was used in a song on an album by Akiko Yano.

Black has received fellowships from the MacDowell Colony (1988), the Fine Arts Work Center in Provincetown (1988), and, most recently, the Bunting Institute of Radcliffe College. As of late 2003, she was teaching at Columbia.

== Bibliography ==
=== Poetry ===
Collections

- The Misunderstanding of Nature. Graywolf Press. 1994.
- The Descent: poetry (2004) Graywolf Press; 73 pages, ISBN 1-55597-406-6 (paperback)
- The Exchange (2013), Graywolf Press; 88 pages, ISBN 1-55597-641-7 (paperback)

List of poems

Title	Year	First published	Reprinted/collected
Chorus and Anti-Chorus	2017	Black, Sophie Cabot (May 8, 2017). "Chorus and Anti-Chorus". The New Yorker. Vol. 93, no. 12. pp. 50–51.	

== Awards ==
- Grolier Poetry Prize, 1988
- John Masefield Award from the Poetry Society of America, 1989
- Emerging Poets Award from Judith's Room, 1990
- Connecticut Book Award for Poetry, 2005

== Personal life ==
Black lives in New York and Wilton, Connecticut.
