= Charles Wall (historian) =

American historian (1903–1995)

Charles Cecil Wall
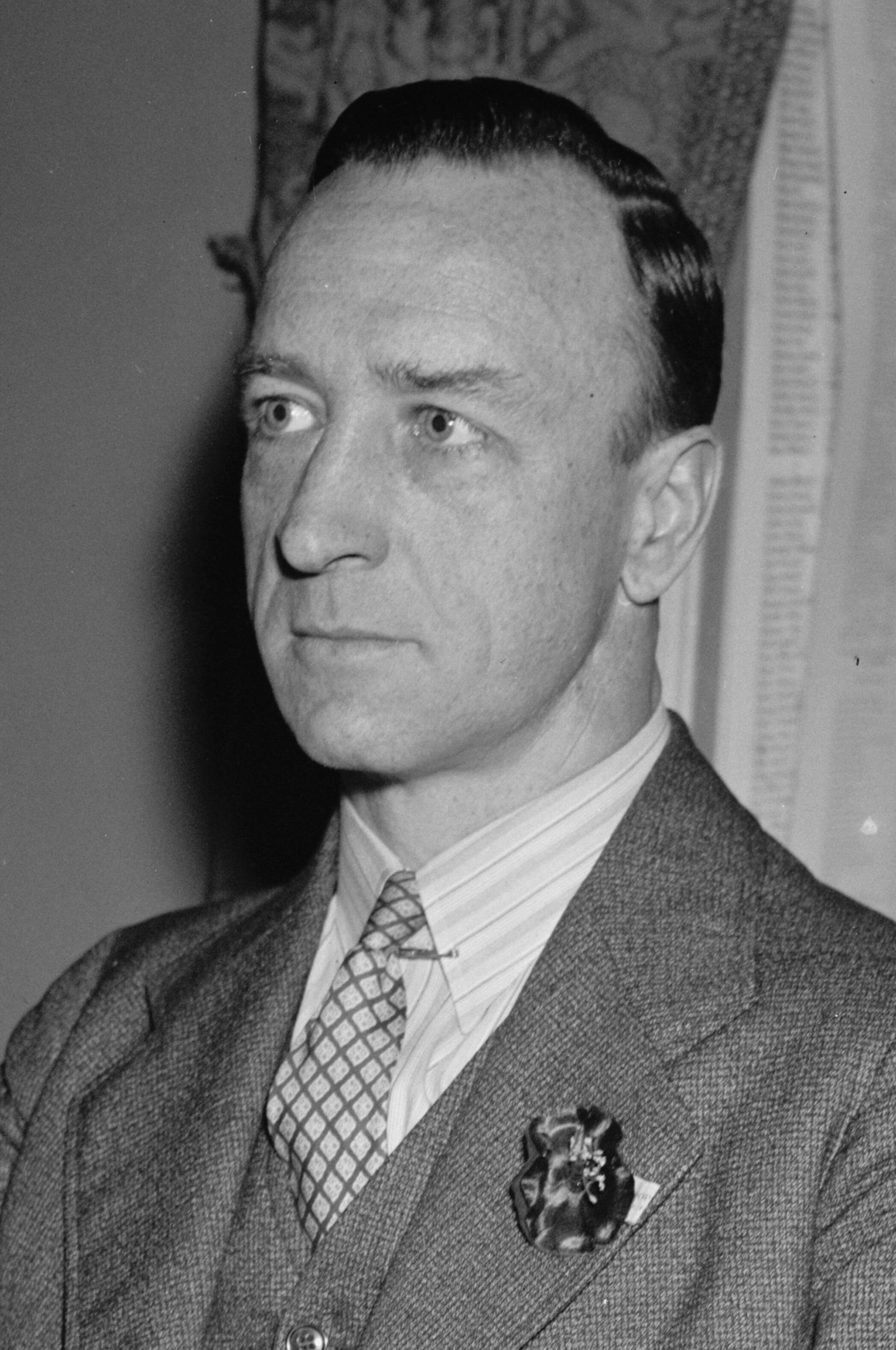

4th Resident Director of Mount Vernon
- In office 1937–1976
- Preceded by: Harrison Howell Dodge
- Succeeded by: Harrison M. Symmes

Personal details
- Born: June 21, 1903 Curwensville, Pennsylvania, U.S.
- Died: May 1, 1995 (aged 91) Greenwich, Connecticut, U.S.
- Education: Wharton School of the University of Pennsylvania

Charles Cecil Wall (June 21, 1903 – May 1, 1995) was an American self-taught historian and preservationist, who spent nearly 40 years as resident director of George Washington's estate at Mount Vernon on the banks of the Potomac River, where he endeavored to keep the home and its surroundings in much the same state that it existed when the First President resided there. Wall grew up in Curwensville, Pennsylvania. A graduate of the Wharton School of the University of Pennsylvania, Wall began a career in business in New York City. With no prior interest in Washington's life, he accepted a job as assistant superintendent at Mount Vernon in 1929, taking the place of a cousin who had died in a drowning accident. During his first years as assistant superintendent, Wall and then-resident superintendent Harrison Howell Dodge rotated turns sleeping as guard in the manor house.

Wall became resident director of Mount Vernon in 1937, succeeding Dodge, who had served in the position for 52 years. Owned and operated by The Mount Vernon Ladies' Association since 1858, Wall was responsible for supervising a staff of 85 and lived on the site in an approximation of the lifestyle available to Washington in his time. His office was the same one used in the 18th century by Washington himself.

He would ride on horseback to inspect the grounds, used a boat to oversee the estate's frontage on the Potomac River and planted greenery consistent with what was used in the 18th century in addition to overseeing restoration at the site. Wall was the first superintendent to reside in a directors house that was constructed on the grounds of the estate. In 1974, a campaign he organized was successful in preserving as parkland areas in Maryland across the Potomac River from Mount Vernon, as part of an effort to retain the bucolic vista from the home. During his tenure he became an expert in all things related to Washington, much of which was included in his 1980 book George Washington: Citizen Soldier.

Wall died at age 91 on May 1, 1995, at a nursing home in Greenwich, Connecticut, due to complications of a stroke. He was survived by a daughter, four grandchildren and six great-grandchildren.
