= Tristan Roberts (politician) =

Vermont state representative

Member of the Vermont House of Representatives from the Windham-6 district
- In office January 4, 2023 – January 8, 2025
- Succeeded by: Emily Carris-Duncan

Personal details
- Party: Democratic
- Education: Marlboro College (BA)

Tristan Roberts is an American politician. He represented the Windham-6 district in the Vermont House of Representatives.

== Early life and education ==
Roberts was raised on a dairy farm in Bacon Hill, New York, attending Schuylerville Central School through ninth grade before graduating from Phillips Academy in Andover, Massachusetts in 1996. After semesters at Albertson College in Caldwell, Idaho and Skidmore College in Saratoga Springs, New York, Roberts transferred to Marlboro College in Marlboro, Vermont in 1998 and graduated in 2000 with a degree in Cognitive Science.
