= William Carris =

American politician (1944–2025)

William H. Carris (August 23, 1944 – October 22, 2025) was an American politician from Vermont.

== Early life, education and military service ==
Carris was born in Hanover, New Hampshire, on August 23, 1944. He was a graduate of Rutland High School in 1963 and Castleton State College. He served in the United States Army and was stationed in Germany for two years. In 1969, he held the rank of specialist and was stationed at Landstuhl.

== Career ==
Carris, a Democrat, was a member of the Vermont Senate representing Rutland County.

From 2012 to 2013, Carris was Senate Majority Leader of the Vermont Senate. He was succeeded in this position by Chittenden County Senator Philip Baruth.

He joined the family business Carris Reels, Inc. in 1971, a company that manufactures reels started by his father Henry Carris in 1951. The company became Carris Financial Corporation.

== Personal life and death ==
His daughter Emily Carris-Duncan is a member of the Vermont House of Representatives.

Carris died on October 22, 2025, at the age of 81.
