= Arthur Magida =

American author and journalist

- Born: Arthur J. Magida
- Education: Marlboro College
- Occupations: Author; journalist
- Website: www.arthurmagida.com

Arthur J. Magida is an American author and journalist.

He is a graduate of Marlboro College.

== Books ==
- The Nazi Séance: The Strange Story of The Jewish Psychic in Hitler’s Circle (Palgrave Macmillan, 2011)
- The Rabbi and the Hit Man: A True Tale of Murder, Passion, and the Shattered Faith of a Congregation (HarperCollins)
- Prophet Of Rage: A Life Of Louis Farrakhan And His Nation (1996)
- Code Name Madeleine: A Sufi Spy in Nazi-Occupied Paris (W. W. Norton & Company, 2020)
- Two Wheels to Freedom: The Story of a Young Jew, Wartime Resistance, and a Daring Escape (2024)
