= Harrison Howell Dodge =

American residence superintendent

Harrison Howell Dodge LL.D.
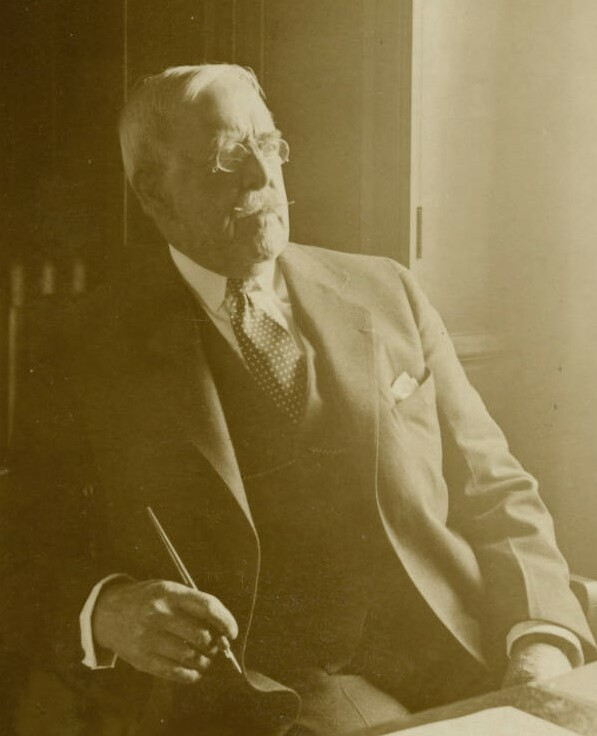
- Dodge in 1933

3rd Superintendent of Mount Vernon
- In office 1885 – 1937
- Preceded by: John McHenry Hollingsworth
- Succeeded by: Charles Cecil Wall

Personal details
- Born: March 31, 1852 Washington, D.C.
- Died: May 20, 1937 (aged 85) Washington, D.C.
- Education: Columbian College
- Burial place: Pohick Church, Lorton, Virginia

Harrison Howell Dodge (March 31, 1852 - May 20, 1937) was the third resident superintendent of George Washington's estate at Mount Vernon. During his 52 years overseeing the estate, he doubled the facility's acreage, improved the grounds, and added many historic artifacts to the collections there.

== Early and family life ==
Dodge was born on March 31, 1852, in Washington, D.C. Being underage during the American Civil War, he assisted on his uncle's farm in Maryland during the conflict. Dodge graduated from Columbian College, which was later renamed George Washington University.

== Banking and clerical careers ==
After graduating from college, Dodge worked in the Wall Street banking house of Jay Cooke & company, until that firm collapsed during the Panic of 1873. He returned to Washington, D.C., where he spent 1874 indexing the Congressional Record. He worked from 1874 to 1877 with commissioners of a sinking fund before accepting a position at Riggs & Co. (1877-1885). There, the longtime clerk gained a reputation for meticulous accounts, that helped him gain the position which Dodge held for the next five decades.

== Superintendent ==
In 1885, the regents of The Mount Vernon Ladies' Association (MVLA) appointed Dodge as the successor of John McHenry Hollingsworth, who had succeeded MVLA founder Ann Pamela Cunningham in 1872. The nationwide depression in 1882-1883 caused tourism to drop. The non-resident Hollingsworth's means of addressing the revenue drop alienated first the staff (which also had to deal with vandalism and natural deterioration of the wet historic site) and then the MVLA regents. However, his departure proved messier than Cunningham's exit. Dodge also succeeded Hollingsworth as postmaster for the Mount Vernon post office. United States President Grover Cleveland appointed Dodge to the latter position, and successive Presidents reappointed him until his death.

While managing Mount Vernon, in addition to his primary duties of handling visitors to the historic site and managing the farm, Dodge reviewed George Washington's writings about the estate. Dodge also visited other Colonial-era gardens and traveled to England to see gardens there dating from the Georgian period. Using this knowledge, Dodge oversaw the restoration of the site and put in place a number of improvements that Washington had planned but never implemented. This restoration work was completed from 1932 to 1935 by Charles Wilson Killam. Dodge and then-assistant superintendent Charles Wall, who had been hired in 1929, rotated turns sleeping as guards in the manor house. Dodge's 1932 book Mount Vernon: Its Owner and Its Story, with an introduction by Owen Wister, told many stories about Washington and his home, including details of a mechanical roasting spit that Washington had designed and of finding a pocketknife that had belonged to Washington in his youth. The knife was said to have played a role at Valley Forge in convincing the general to continue as leader of the Continental Army in one of its darkest days. George Washington University recognized Harrison Howell Dodge in 1931 with an honorary LL.D. degree.

== Death and legacy ==
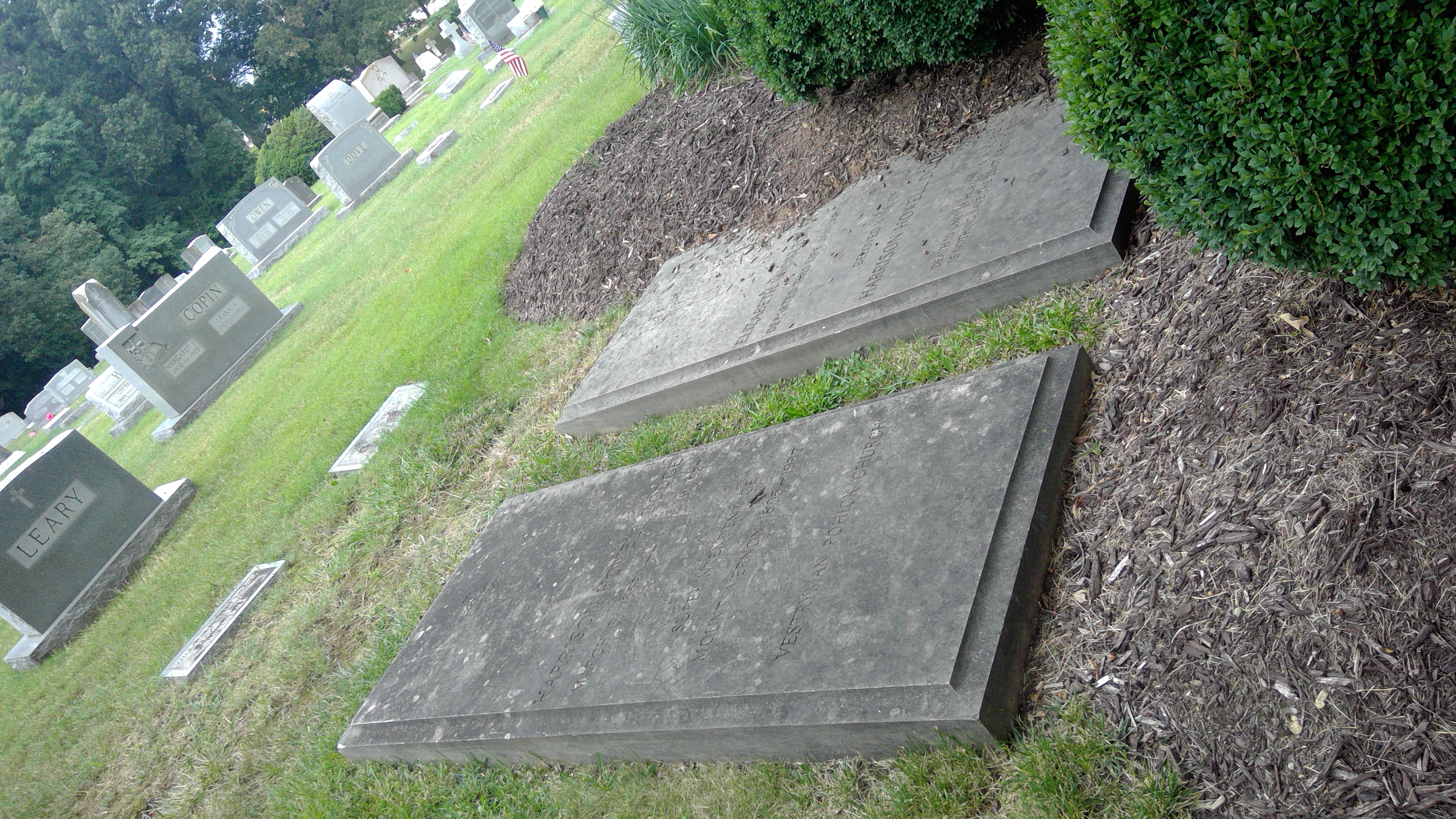
Graves of Dodge and his wife, in the cemetery of Pohick Church.

Dodge died at age 85 on May 20, 1937, at Garfield Hospital in Washington, D.C. He was survived by his wife, the former Elizabeth Knowlton, and two of his four daughters. He was succeeded as resident superintendent in 1937 by Charles Wall, who continued many of the improvements to the grounds and buildings that Dodge had initiated. He is buried in the cemetery of Pohick Church, at which he served for many years as vestryman.
