= Joseph Mazur =

American mathematician

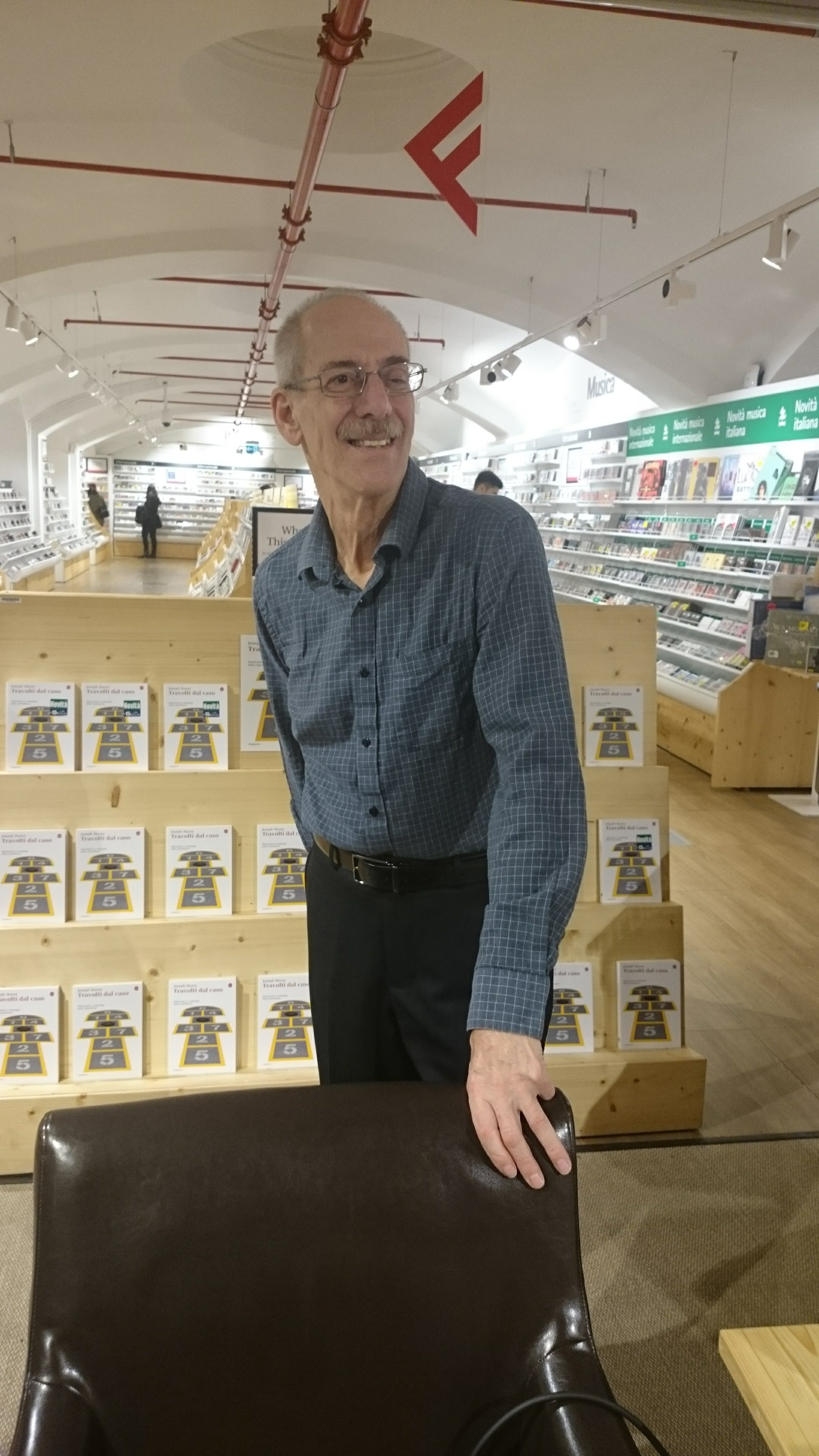
Joseph Mazur at a launch of the Italian translation of his book Fluke in Milano, Italy - October 24, 2017

Joseph C. Mazur (born in the Bronx in 1942) is an American mathematician. He is professor emeritus of Mathematics at Marlboro College, in Marlboro, Vermont.

He holds a B.S. from Pratt Institute, where he first studied architecture. He spent his junior year in Paris, studying mathematics in classes with Claude Chevalley and Roger Godement and returned to Pratt to earn a B.S. in mathematics. From there he went directly to M.I.T to receive his Ph.D. in mathematics (algebraic geometry) in 1972. He has held a visiting scholar position at M.I.T and several visiting professor positions at The Mathematics Institute of the University of Warwick.

In 2006 he was awarded a Guggenheim Fellowship for work on mathematical narrative. In 2008 he was awarded a Bellagio Fellowship from the Rockefeller Foundation, and in 2009 was elected to Fellow of the Vermont Academy of Arts and Sciences. In 2011, 2013, and 2019 he was awarded Bogliasco Fellowships.

Since 1972 he has taught all areas of mathematics, its history and philosophy. He has authored many educational software programs, including Explorations in Calculus, the first interactive, multimedia CD package of simulations for calculus. He is the author of several mathematics books that have been translated into more than a dozen languages. He is also interested in history of science. He is the brother of Barry Mazur and uncle of Alexander J. Mazur (Barry's son).

== Bibliography ==
- Euclid In the Rainforest: Discovering Universal Truth in Logic and Math, Plume, 2005 (Finalist for the PEN/Martha Albrand Award for First Nonfiction). ISBN 0-452-28783-9
- The Motion Paradox: The 2,500-Year-Old Puzzle Behind All The Mysteries of Time and Space, Dutton, 2007. ISBN 978-0-525-94992-3
- Number: The Language of Science (Ed.) Plume, 2005. ISBN 978-0-452-28811-9
- What's Luck Got to Do with It? The History, Mathematics and Psychology of the Gambler's Illusion, Princeton, 2010. ISBN 978-0-691-13890-9
- Enlightening Symbols: A Short History of Mathematical Notation and Its Hidden Powers, Princeton, 2014. ISBN 978-0-691-15463-3
- Fluke: The Maths and Myths of Coincidences, London: Oneworld Publications. 2016. ISBN 978-1-78074-899-3
- The Clock Mirage: Our Myth of Measured Time, Yale University Press, 2020. ISBN 0-300-22932-1
