= Sean Cole =

American radio producer (born 1971)

- Born: November 19, 1971 (age 54)
- Education: Marlboro College
- Years active: 1997–Present
- Employer: WNYC

Sean Cole (born November 19, 1971) is an American journalist and poet. He is a producer for the radio show and podcast This American Life.

== Early life ==
Cole is from the Boston area. He grew up in the Unitarian Church. In episode 660 of This American Life, "Hoaxing Yourself," Cole recounted how he spoke with an affected British accent from ages 14 to 16, a habit that sprang from his fondness for British programs like Doctor Who and Dempsey and Makepeace.

He attended Marlboro College in Vermont, graduating in 1993.

== Career ==
Cole's career in radio began in 1997 with an internship at the Boston NPR affiliate WBUR. He went on to work there for nine years as a news-writer, engineer, announcer, field-producer, reporter and, finally, a correspondent for the documentary series Inside Out. From 2006 to 2011, he was a contract reporter for American Public Media's Marketplace and, briefly, a senior reporter for Weekend America. He then worked as a staff producer for WNYC’s Radiolab for a year and a half. Cole has also contributed to the NPR programs All Things Considered, Only a Game, and the podcast 99% Invisible among other shows. From mid-2011 through 2013, he was a regular guest host for The Story with Dick Gordon out of WUNC in North Carolina.

Cole became a contributor at This American Life in 1999, and then joined the staff in 2014. He is currently a Supervising Producer for the show and serves as guest host occasionally.

In 2021, Cole won the Best Documentary: Gold award in the Third Coast / Richard H. Driehaus Foundation Competition for his story "Time Bandit," which was also nominated for a Peabody Award.

== Poetry ==
In May 2022, Cole released the poetry collection After These Messages on Lunar Chandelier press. He's also the author of the chapbook Itty City (Pressed Wafer, 2003) and other chapbooks. In the anthology, Starting Today: 100 Poems for Obama's First 100 Days, Cole's was day 95. His poem "To Acropolis" was included in a collection of art and writing to benefit victims of the Boston Marathon bombing. In a review, Audrey Mardavich called Cole "a superb thinker: he can be irreverent when it matters most, he is inventive with his images and sounds, he is very funny".

In 2019, Marlboro College awarded Cole an honorary doctorate in humane letters.

== Bibliography ==
- Itty City (Pressed Wafer, 2003)
- The December Project (Boog Literature, 2005)
- One Train (Dusie, 2012)
- After These Messages (Lunar Chandelier, 2022)

== Selected poems ==
- "Union Street" and "Gansett Point"
- "From the February Sonnets"
- "March 18, 2020" and "March 22, 2020"
- "Show"
- "five"—co-written with David Kirschenbaum
- "From the States Project"—co-written with David Kirschenbaum
