= Regina Lee Blaszczyk =

American historian

Regina Lee Blaszczyk is an American historian. She is a professor of business history and leadership chair in the history of business and society at The University of Leeds. She is an associate editor at the Journal of Design History.

== Education ==
Blaszczyk graduated from Marlboro College with a B.A. in 1978. She received a M.A. in American Civilization from The George Washington University in 1987. In 1995, She received her PhD from the University of Delaware Hagley Program in the History of Capitalism, Technology, and Culture.

== Career ==
Blaszczyk has been a curator at the Smithsonian National Museum of American History, a professor of American Studies at Boston University, and director of programs at the Chemical Heritage Foundation in Philadelphia.

She has received numerous honors including: The Hagley Prize for the Best Book in Business History from the Business History Conference, the Sally Hacker Prize for Exceptional Scholarship that Reaches Beyond the Academy from the Society for the History of Technology.

== Books ==
- Imagining Consumers: Design and Innovation from Wedgwood to Corning Johns Hopkins University Press, 2000
- Partners in Innovation: Science Education and the Science Workforce Chemical Heritage Foundation, 2005
- Major Problems in American Business History: Documents and Essays Houghton Mifflin, 2006
- Producing Fashion: Commerce, Culture and Consumers University of Pennsylvania Press, 2008
- Rohm and Haas: A Century of Innovation Fenwick and University of Pennsylvania Press, 2009
- American Consumer Society, 1865-2005: From Hearth to HDTV Wiley (The American History Series), 2009
- The Color Revolution The MIT Press, 2012
- 100 Years of Innovation: A Legacy of Pedagogy and Research. University of Delaware Chemical & Biomolecular Engineering University of Delaware Press and Rowman & Littlefield, 2014
- Bright Modernity: Color, Commerce, and Consumers Palgrave Macmillan, 2017
- Fashionability: Abraham Moon and the Creation of British Cloth for the Global Market Manchester University Press, 2017
- European Fashion: The Creation of a Global Industry Manchester University Press. 2018
- The Fashion Forecasters: A Hidden History of Color and Trend Forecasting Bloomsbury Academic, 2018
