= Emily Carris-Duncan =

American politician from Vermont

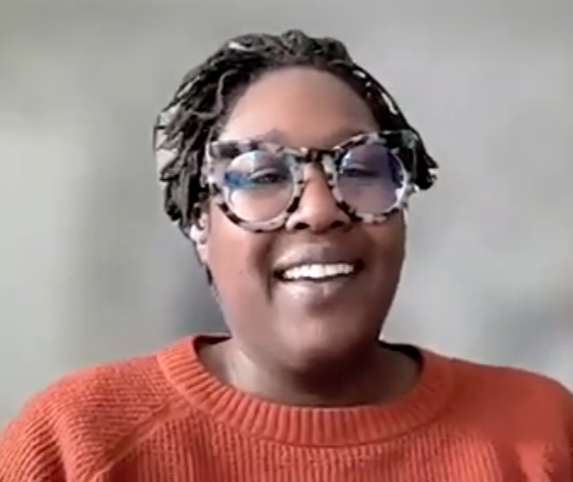
- In a 2024 interview

Member of the Vermont House of Representatives from the Windham 6 district
- Incumbent
- Assumed office January 8, 2025
- Preceded by: Tristan Roberts

Personal details
- Born: Grand Prairie, Texas, US
- Party: Democratic
- Parent: William Carris (father)
- Website: www.ecarrisduncan.com

Emily Carris-Duncan is an American politician from Vermont. She has been a Democratic member of the Vermont House of Representatives for the Windham 6 District since 2025.

== Early life ==
Emily Carris-Duncan is a fifth-generation Vermonter. Her father William Carris served in the Vermont Senate.

== Career ==
Carris-Duncan is an educator, artist and small business owner.

== Personal life ==
Emily Carris-Duncan is bisexual.
