= Lisa Marsh Ryerson =

American academic administrator

6th President of Southern New Hampshire University
- Incumbent
- Assumed office July 1, 2024
- Preceded by: Paul LeBlanc

18th President of Wells College
- In office 1995–2013
- Preceded by: Robert A. Plane
- Succeeded by: Thomas E. J. de Witt (interim)

Personal details
- Education: Wells College (BA); State University of New York at Cortland (MS)

Lisa Marsh Ryerson is an American academic administrator serving, since 2024, as the sixth president of Southern New Hampshire University. She was president of Wells College from 1995 to 2013.

== Life ==
Ryerson is from Jamestown, New York. She earned a Bachelor of Arts in English with honors from Wells College in 1981. She completed a Master of Science in education and literacy from the State University of New York at Cortland.

Ryerson began her career teaching fifth and eighth grade. She was president of the AARP Foundation for eight years.

=== Wells College ===
1984, Ryerson joined the admissions office at Wells College. She was promoted to dean of students in 1991. In 1994, she became its vice president in February, executive-vice president in June, and acting president in the Fall, succeeding Robert A. Plane. She was appointed president in 1995, serving in that role until 2013.

=== Southern New Hampshire University ===
Ryerson served for a year on the Southern New Hampshire University board of trustees before becoming the provost in June 2022. In December 2023, Ryerson was selected for a two-year term. She succeeded Paul LeBlanc as the sixth president on July 1, 2024.
