= Harrison M. Symmes =

American college president and diplomat (1921–2010)

Harrison Matthew Symmes

5th Resident Director of Mount Vernon
- In office 1977 – 1979
- Preceded by: Charles Wall
- Succeeded by: John A. Castellani

President of Windham College
- In office 1974 – 1976
- Preceded by: Eugene Clinton Winslow

8th United States Ambassador to Jordan
- In office October 18, 1967 – May 7, 1970
- President: Lyndon B. Johnson; Richard Nixon
- Preceded by: Findley Burns Jr.
- Succeeded by: L. Dean Brown

Director of Near Eastern Affairs
- In office 1963 – 1966

Personal details
- Born: November 11, 1921 Wilmington, North Carolina
- Died: May 8, 2010 (aged 88) Winchester, Virginia
- Education: University of North Carolina at Chapel Hill (BPh); George Washington University (MA)

Harrison Matthew Symmes (November 11, 1921 – May 8, 2010) was a career American diplomat who served as the American Ambassador to Jordan from 1967 to 1970. When he retired from the Foreign Service in 1974, Symmes became President of Windham College followed by becoming Resident Director of Mount Vernon in 1977.

== Personal life ==
Symmes finished his bachelor's degree in Philosophy at the University of North Carolina at Chapel Hill and earned a master's degree in International Relations at George Washington University in 1947. From 1962–1963, he was at Harvard University’s Center for International Affairs based on being awarded a Harvard University Fellowship. He was a member of the National Honor Society, Phi Beta Kappa, and Pi Gamma Mu.

During World II, he served in the United States Army from 1942 to 1946 and entered the Foreign Service in 1947. He died at his home of natural causes.

== Career ==
Symmes spent almost three decades as an Arabic Language and Area Specialist at the State Department, going on to serve as Director of Near Eastern Affairs from 1963 to 1966, then Director of Personnel before his appointment as Ambassador.

On April 17, 1970, King Hussein asked that Symmes be recalled because the Assistant Secretary of State for Near Eastern and South Asian Affairs, Joseph J. Sisco, was not intending to stop in Jordan while he was in the Middle East. The King blamed Symmes for the decision not to go to Amman.

After the West Bank was seized by Israel during the Six-Day War, members of the militant Palestinian group Fedayeen ultimately ”attacked” the US Embassy in Amman as part of a series of events “ seeking retribution for their dislocation.” As a result, Sisco cancelled the trip he had planned while he was in the region. Hussein took this as a personal insult.

Besides being posted in Jordan, Symmes also spent time posted in Egypt, Syria, Kuwait and Libya.
