= Marcus DeSieno =

American photographer

Marcus DeSieno is a lens-based artist from Albany, New York who is based in Ellensburg, Washington. His work explores the longstanding relationship between photography and science and combines classical and contemporary photographic techniques. He is currently an assistant professor of photography at Central Washington University in Ellensburg, Washington.

== Early life and education ==
DeSieno received his Degree in Documentary Studies/Documentary Photography from the Salt Institute for Documentary Studies in 2008 and his Bachelor of Arts from Marlboro College, where he focused on Photography, in 2010. He went on to complete his Masters in Fine Arts in Studio Art at the University of South Florida in 2015.

== Work ==
DeSieno’s works include several collections of photographs, including Surveillance Landscapes, Mars, Self-Portraits, Parasites, and Cosmos. DeSieno uses antiquated photographic processes along with contemporary imaging methods to explore how the invention of photography has shaped our perception of nature and the universe around us.

=== Cosmos Series ===
To create his works for Cosmos, DeSieno collected various strains of bacteria from public and private places, such as ATM machines, iPhone screens, toilet seats, saliva, and human orifices, and bred them on surfaces of film depicting scenes from outer space originally taken by the Hubble Space Telescope, NASA, and the European Space Agency (ESA). He then scanned the film, killing the microscopic ecosystem, after it had been partially eaten away by the bacteria. Examples of titles of the works in the series include A Photograph of the Reticulum Constellation Eaten by Bacteria Found on My Television’s Remote, A Photograph of the Crab Nebula Eaten by Bacteria Found on a Table at a Red Lobster Restaurant, and A Photograph of the Planet Venus Eaten by Bacteria Found Inside of a Vagina. Uniting microscopic organisms with infinite galaxies, DeSieno states in an interview with FeatureShoot that “Cosmos ultimately refutes mankind’s dominion over the universe as much as it strives to affirm it, and the bacteria become an allegory for the fragility of human life. We, like the microbes, flicker in and out of existence, and if we’re lucky, we leave something beautiful behind”.

DeSieno attributes his inspiration for his work to three notions. The first is a lifelong fascination with the invisible. As a child, he would place everything under the lens of the microscope his parents gave him. The second is a desire to interrogate photographic materiality in an age of digital uniformity. The third is an exploration and confrontation with his childhood fears of bacteria and germs.

=== Parasites Series ===
In his making of Parasites, DeSieno combined classical and cutting-edge photographic techniques. He captured images of microscopic organisms that dwell in the human body obtained through the National Institutes of Health (NIH), microscopy laboratories at the University of South Florida, and Etsy. DeSieno first dehydrated the dead organisms and viewed them under a scanning electron microscope (SEM). He then used images collected from the SEM to print a digital negative, which was exposed to a dry plate gelatin process ferrotype. The ferrotype was scanned, enlarged, and printed at four-foot length prints. In an interview with National Geographic's Proof, DeSieno articulates his belief that "photo and science have had an intrinsic relationship since its conception—the founding mothers and fathers of photo were all scientists themselves. My practice is really driven by curiosity, which is at the heart of scientific inquiry. I’d like to hope that my work can light an inquisitive spark in my viewer that allows them to explore their own wonders and fears”.

=== Surveillance Landscape Series ===
To create the images for Surveillance Landscapes, DeSieno taps into surveillance cameras from around the world. The artist is interested in developing public understanding of privacy in the "surveillance state" by using empty landscapes as a metaphor to show that we are never truly alone.

== Exhibitions ==
DeSieno has had solo exhibitions entitled Parasites at Gallery 501 and Invisible Monster: Parasites at the Vermont Center for Photography. His work has also been exhibited nationally at the Aperture Foundation in New York, The Center for Fine Art Photography in Fort Collins, Colorado; the Fort Wayne Museum of Art in Indiana; and Rayko Photo Center in San Francisco, among others. In addition, DeSieno’s pieces have been featured in a variety of publications including FeatureShoot, Hyperallergic, Huffington Post, LENSCRATCH, National Geographic's Proof, PDN, Slate, Smithsonian Magazine, and Wired
