= Thomas Ragle =

American college president and poet (1927–2023)

Thomas B. Ragle (November 25, 1927 – November 28, 2023) was an American college president and poet. He was the president of Marlboro College from 1958 to 1981.

== Early life and education ==
Ragle was born on November 25, 1927 in Boston, Massachusetts.

He graduated from Shady Hill School and the Phillips Exeter Academy. He graduated from Harvard College with a Bachelor of Arts in ancient Greek history and literature. He then received a BA and MA from the University of Oxford in English language and literature.

== Career ==
Ragle began his career in education teaching English at Exeter Academy. He then served in the Army during the Korean War.

After leaving the army, he became president of Marlboro College, serving in the role from 1958 to 1981. He came to the college looking to teach, but the only position open at the time was as president. During his time as president, he led the college through a time of change where its president had to be less involved in academics due to the increasing demands of managing enrollment and the financial requirements of the federal government. Ragle described his role for the first 15 years at the college as serving as "a 19th-century college president". Marlboro had 50 students when Ragle arrived and about 200 when he retired. At the time of his retirement, he had served longer than any Vermont college president in office at the time. Ragle was replaced by Roderick M. Gander, the former chief of correspondents at Newsweek.

From 1981 to 1983, Ragle was a visiting fellow and administrative assistant to the president at the University of Vermont. From 1983 to 1989, he was the director of the Salzburg Global Seminar in Austria. From 1989 to 1991, he was special consultant to the United Nations Development Programme in Beijing, China. He then was a visiting fellow and administrative assistant to the president of Trinity College in Burlington, Vermont. He retired in 1993.

In 1999, he published Marlboro College, A Memoir. In 2020, he wrote a new foreword for an edition published that year.

== Poetry ==
Ragle wrote poetry under the pen name of Lee Bramble. In 2013, he published a collection of his poems Take This Song: Poems in Pursuit of Meaning.

== Personal life ==
Around the same time he became president of Marlboro College, Ragle married his wife Nancy Koch Ragle. Their marriage lasted 58 years, and they raised seven children together.

Ragle was an active member of the Guilford Community Church in Guilford, Vermont, where he at one time served as a lay preacher.

Ragle died on November 28, 2023, in Bennington, Vermont.
