= Windham College =

Liberal arts college in Putney, Vermont, United States (1951–1978)

Coordinates: 42.9773344°N 72.5123485°W

Windham College was a liberal arts college located in Putney, Vermont, United States, on the campus of what became Landmark College.

== History ==
Windham was founded in 1951 by Walter F. Hendricks as the Vermont Institute of Special Studies. The school's initial aim was to help foreign students improve their English language skills to enable them to meet the requirements for attending U.S. institutions. In 1954, the institution was renamed Windham College and began offering courses in the liberal arts and sciences, earning accreditation in December, 1967. Eugene Winslow succeeded Hendricks as president in 1964, and served for ten years. Under his tenure the college was relocated to an Edward Durell Stone-designed campus outside the village. The academic campus consisted of five buildings: Humanities, Library, Sciences on one side, Fine Arts and the Student Union across the green, all connected by a colonnade. On the hill above stood the five major dormitories, Aiken, Frost, Hendricks, Stone and Dorm Five, as well as two smaller residences, Chumley and Dorm Two.

Under President Winslow, student enrollment grew from 160 to a peak of 935. By 1975, under college president Harrison Symmes, despite aggressive recruitment and placement of Middle Eastern students, the number of students had fallen to 450, perhaps due to the end of the Vietnam War and the decreased demand for student deferments. When it closed in 1978, there were only 254 students.

In 1978, there were more than 75 international students invited from Middle Eastern countries to help the school sustain its financial difficulties, but it closed unceremoniously, in the middle of the cold Vermont winter, two weeks prior to the winter holidays. Stranded international students were forced to leave the school premises by order of the local sheriff, and all of the dormitories were vacated and padlocked. Most international students lost their tuition money (and their boarding costs) that had been paid in advance four weeks prior, and were forced to disperse to other parts of the USA or to return to their countries. Most of the foreign students were guided to another local school that helped them to take shelter during the cold winter for a short period, in hopes of absorbing them as new students or for humanitarian reasons.

John Irving taught at Windham when he wrote his first novel, Setting Free the Bears. Part of Irving's novel Last Night in Twisted River is set around Putney, where a character teaches at Windham. Irving writes in the novel: "Windham College was an architectural eyesore on an otherwise beautiful piece of land."

Pearl S. Buck was a trustee of the college.

== Presidents ==
1. Walter F. Hendricks (1951–1964)
2. Eugene Winslow (1964–1974)
3. Harrison M. Symmes (1974–1976)
4. Johnnie Lee Stones (1976–1978)

== Notable alumni ==
- William Powell, author of The Anarchist Cookbook, graduated as co-valedictorian
- Karen Wise, the first woman to play NCAA college basketball, when she appeared in a game for the Windham College men's team on January 20, 1972.

== See also ==
- List of colleges and universities in Vermont
