= G.I. American universities =

Universities set up by the US Army in 1945

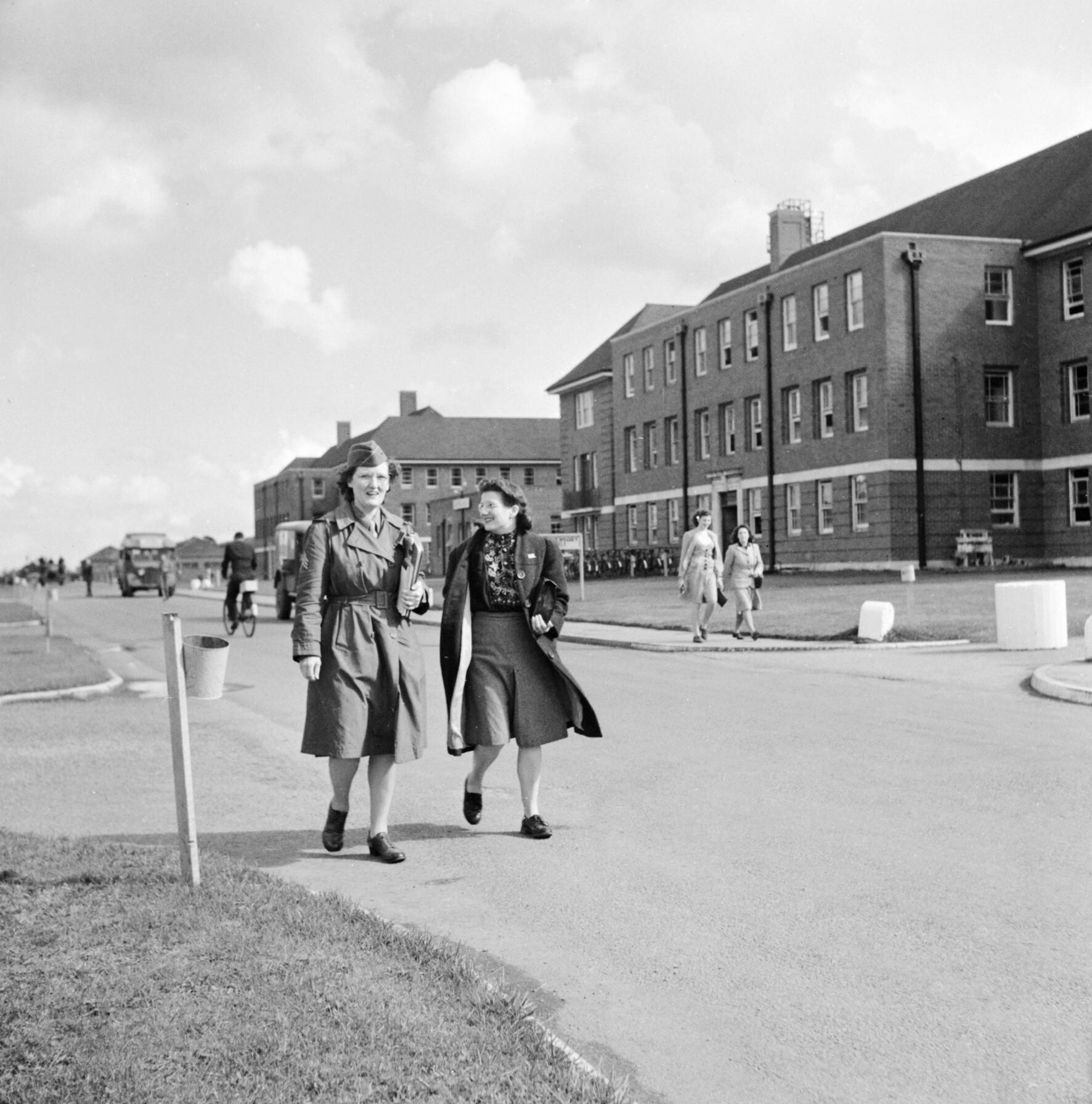
A US Army servicewoman with an English friend at Shrivenham American University in 1945

In Spring 1945, the U.S. Army's Information and Educational Branch made formal plans to establish overseas university campuses for American service men and women, awaiting demobilization, or redeployment to another theater. Three University centers were eventually established in the French resort town of Biarritz, the English town of Shrivenham, Berkshire, and in Florence, Italy. These three campuses were set up to provide a transition between army life and a successful transition to civilian life, with career training and possibly attendance at a university in the US. Most students attended for just one term.

Students removed their caps, and therefore the distinction between officers and enlisted personnel was eliminated.

== Background ==
After Victory in Europe in World War II, hundreds of thousands of United States soldiers awaited either discharge and return home, or transfer to the Pacific Theater of Operations. Although almost 90,000 left Europe in May 1945 alone, many would have to wait months. The military created educational programs for them, both to improve morale and to help them transition to civilian life, or continue education the war interrupted. In addition to new colleges at Shrivenham and Biarritz, and a technical school at Warton, Lancashire, 35 European civilian universities accommodated 32,000 soldier students.

Battalions and larger units offered their own programs for those the larger programs did not accept, employing civilians, qualified military personnel, and (after anti-fraternization rules were eased) English-speaking German civilians. Seventh United States Army in August 1945's 134 schools taught 133 courses to 44,000 students. By October the European Theater of Operations had almost 300 schools. Another option was the United States Armed Forces Institute's free high school or college credit, which taught 93,000 soldiers from May to September 1945.

== Florence American University ==
The first American university for service personnel was established in June 1945 at the School of Aeronautics in Florence, Italy. Some 7,500 soldier-students were to pass through the university during its four one-month sessions from July to November 1945.

== Biarritz American University ==
Under General Samuel L. McCroskey, the hotels and casinos of Biarritz in France were converted into quarters, labs, and class spaces for U.S. service personnel. The university opened 10 August 1945, and approximately 10,000 students attended at least one eight-week term. BAU ran the longest of any of the centers and made a significant impact on both faculty and students, as well as the local community. The curriculum covered the range of subject of any state-side university, students established a full symphony orchestra, a choir, a theater group, and two basketball teams; a local hotel was rebuilt by the engineering class, a daily newspaper was published by the journalism program, and the theater program performed in local orphanages and hospitals. The social highlight of the BAU's existence was a fashion show and beauty contest held as benefits for French war orphans, which Marlene Dietrich attended. It was a return to "normal" and a stepping stone to a future for many.

Staffing for the university came from many sources. Service members were recruited as administrators and instructors in fields they were trained in prior to the war, hundreds of faculty were recruited from US colleges and universities, and administrative staff from multiple headquarters, including members of the British military such as Angela Vivian, a British civilian secretaries working at that time in Paris since the liberation. "I believe there were 40 of us “carefully chosen” as the General wrote to our Supervisor in his letter of appreciation when the University eventually closed the following March 1946. We were billeted in a beautifully luxurious hotel overlooking the sea. Each of us had a room and bathroom. We could not believe our luck."

After three successful terms, the university closed in March 1946.

Walter F. Hendricks, who would go on to found three colleges in Vermont between 1946 and 1966 served as director of English at the university. The music department was directed by Edwin Stringham from Queens College and included Seth Bingham. Other instructors included Édouard Herriot and Charles Rist. A student newspaper The Banner was published five times a week.

== Shrivenham American University ==
Under Brig. Gen. Paul W. Thompson, Com-Z Chief of Information and Education-ETO, a British Army Camp near Swindon was converted into a university campus, with Brig. Gen. Claude Thiele serving as commandant. After two successful terms, the university closed in December 1945. About 4,000 students attended each term.

== See also ==
- Bull College - a similar short-lived program at the University of Cambridge.
