= Ellen McCulloch-Lovell =

- Education: Bennington College (BA)
- Political party: Democratic

Ellen McCulloch-Lovell is an academic administrator who was the president of Marlboro College from 2004 until 2015.

== Biography ==
McCulloch-Lovell graduated from Bennington College in 1969.

She served as executive director of the Vermont Arts Council from 1970 to 1983 and served as Chief of Staff to Vermont Senator Patrick Leahy from 1983 to 1994. Under the Clinton administration, she worked as executive director of the President's Committee on the Arts and Humanities, deputy chief of staff to the First Lady, and deputy assistant to the President and advisor to the First Lady on the Millennium Project.

She was the first woman to serve as president of Marlboro College, from April 2004 until 2015.

After her retirement from Marlboro, she joined the board of trustees at Windham Foundation.
