= Marlboro, Vermont =

- Town
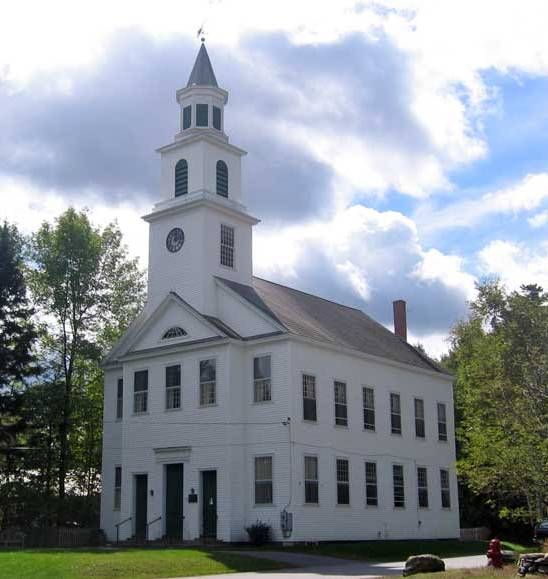
- the Marlboro Meeting House Congregational Church (2004)

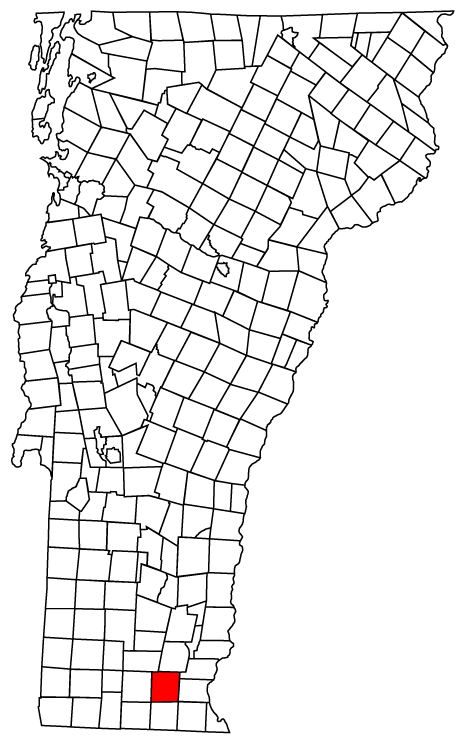
- Marlboro, Vermont
- Coordinates: 42°52′47″N 72°44′56″W
- Country: United States
- State: Vermont
- County: Windham
- Chartered: 1751
- Communities: Marlboro; Ames Hill

Area
  - Total: 40.7 sq mi (105.3 km^{2})
  - Land: 40.3 sq mi (104.5 km^{2})
  - Water: 0.31 sq mi (0.8 km^{2})
- Elevation: 1,444 ft (440 m)

Population (2020)
  - Total: 1,722
  - Density: 43/sq mi (16.5/km^{2})
- Time zone: UTC-5 (Eastern (EST))
  - Summer (DST): UTC-4 (EDT)
- ZIP Codes: 05344 (Marlboro); 05301 (Brattleboro); 05363 (Wilmington); 05351 (South Newfane)
- Area code: 802
- FIPS code: 50-43375
- GNIS feature ID: 1462143
- Website: marlborovt.gov

Marlboro is a town in Windham County, Vermont, United States. The population was 1,722 at the 2020 census. The town is home to the Southern Vermont Natural History Museum and the Campus at Marlboro Music (formerly Marlboro College), which hosts the Marlboro Music School and Festival each summer, as well as other arts and education programs throughout the year.

== History ==
Named "New Marlborough" for the Duke of Marlborough until 1800, the town was a New Hampshire grant chartered on April 29, 1751, to Timothy Dwight and 64 others from Northampton, Massachusetts and vicinity. The French and Indian War prevented settlement, so the first charter was forfeited and a new one issued by Governor Benning Wentworth on September 21, 1761, then again on April 17, 1764, as New Marlborough. The town was surveyed in 1762, and 64 equal "rights" (divisions) were created, with four lots in the center of town excepted. First settled in 1763, the town grew rapidly between 1764 and 1770 with emigrants from Massachusetts and Connecticut. By 1799 there were 313 children registered in the town's schools.

The town's population peaked in 1820 with 1300 people, the subsequent decline caused by immigration to the west and a downturn in the area's economy. Although the terrain is mountainous, the soil is rich and deep, which allowed farmers to grow good crops. When the population was 896 in 1859, the community was almost exclusively agricultural.

=== Town Common ===
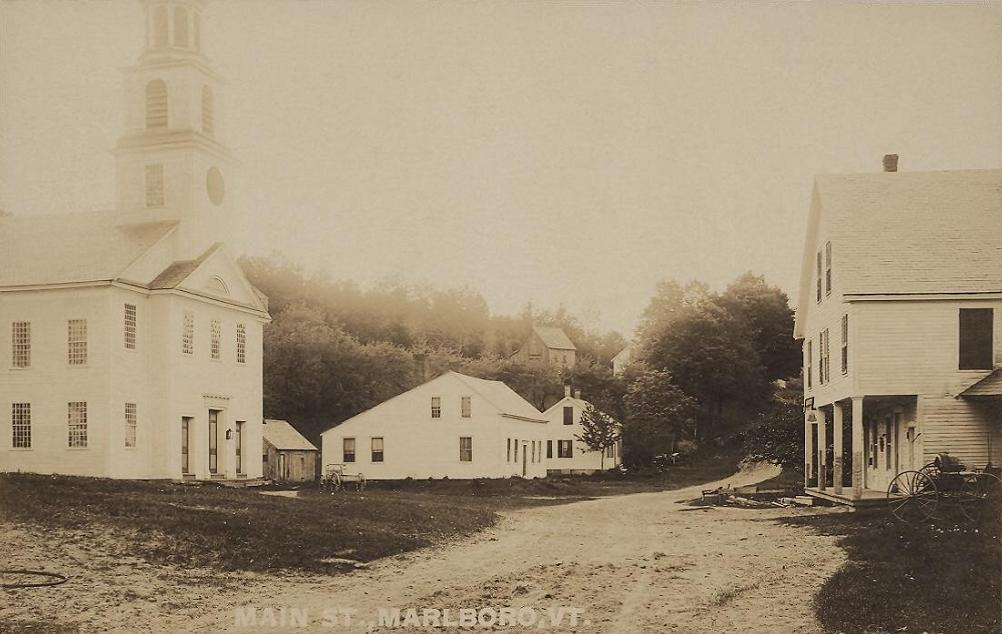
The Town Common in 1908

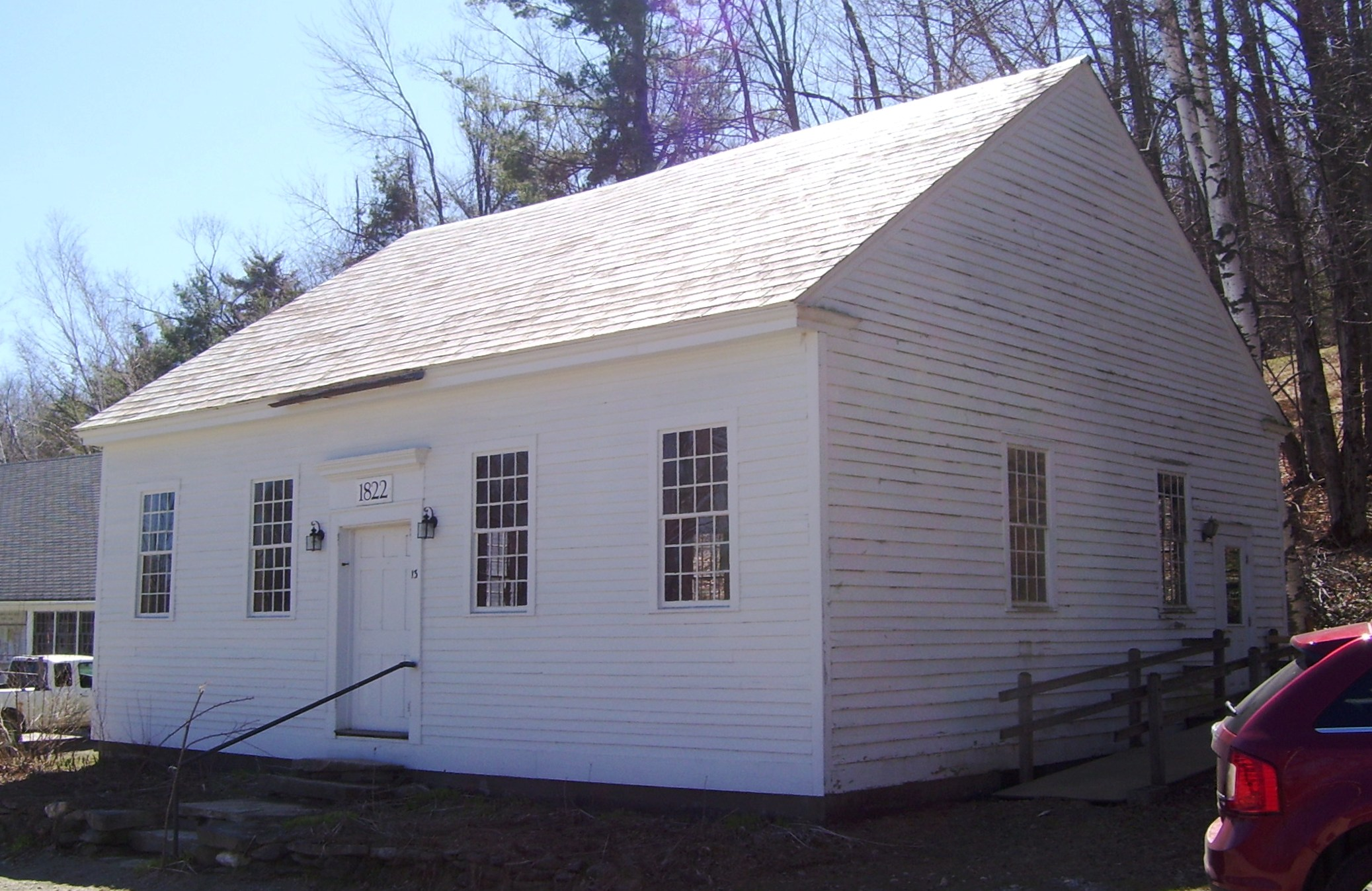
The Town House, used for town meetings, was built in 1822, and later moved to its current location

Located on the Town Common are the Town House (1822), used for town meetings, the Town Offices and Post Office building (1969), the Marlboro Meeting House Congregational Church (1931), and the Whetstone Inn (c. 1775).

The town's first church was organized in 1776, and put up at the top of Town Hill in 1778. In 1820, it was replaced by a newer structure nearby, and timbers and board from the old church were used in 1822 to build the Town House, which was also located in the vicinity. Between 1836 and 1844 both of these buildings—the church and the Town House—were moved down the hill to about their current locations on the Town Common. The church burned down in 1931 was replaced by the current one, which is roughly a reproduction of its predecessor, except slightly smaller.

After the move down the hill, Town House was on the east side of South Road, but when it was hit by a new, oversized snow plow in 1966, it was moved across the road to its current location.

The Whetstone Inn was built around 1775 by Deacon Jonas Whitney, who arrived in Marlboro in 1773. Over its history, it has been various used as a courthouse, church, tavern, dance hall and post office.

=== 20th century ===
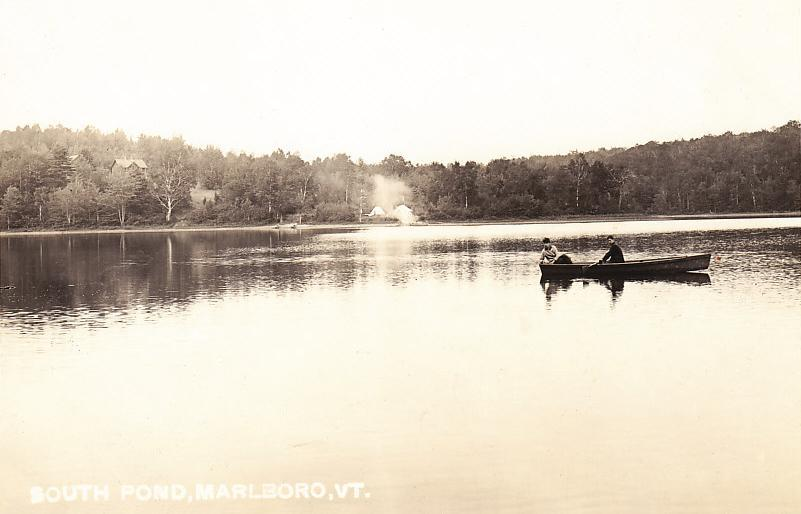
South Pond in 1908

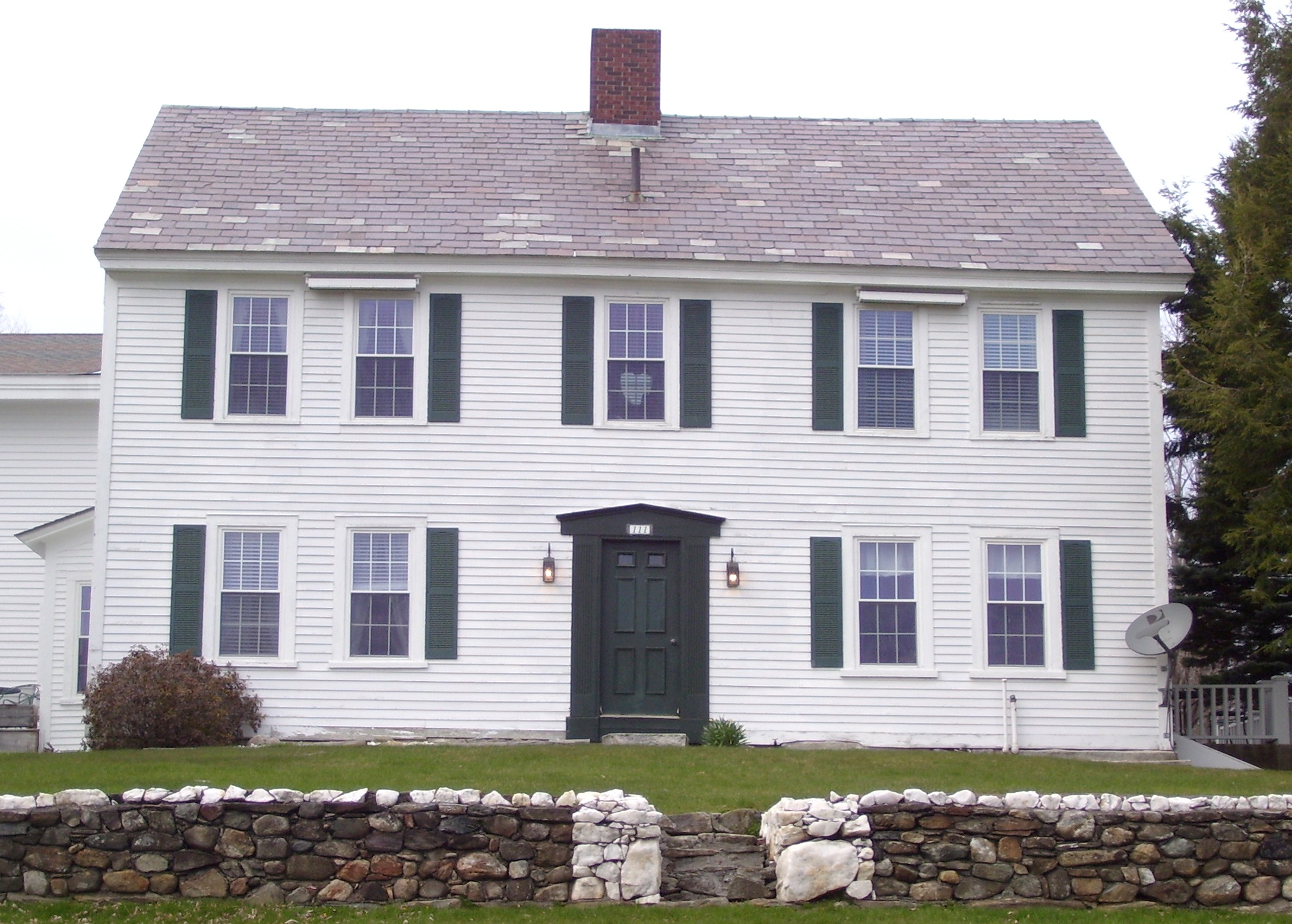
The Colonel Williams Inn, on the Molly Stark Trail (State Route 9) was built c. 1769

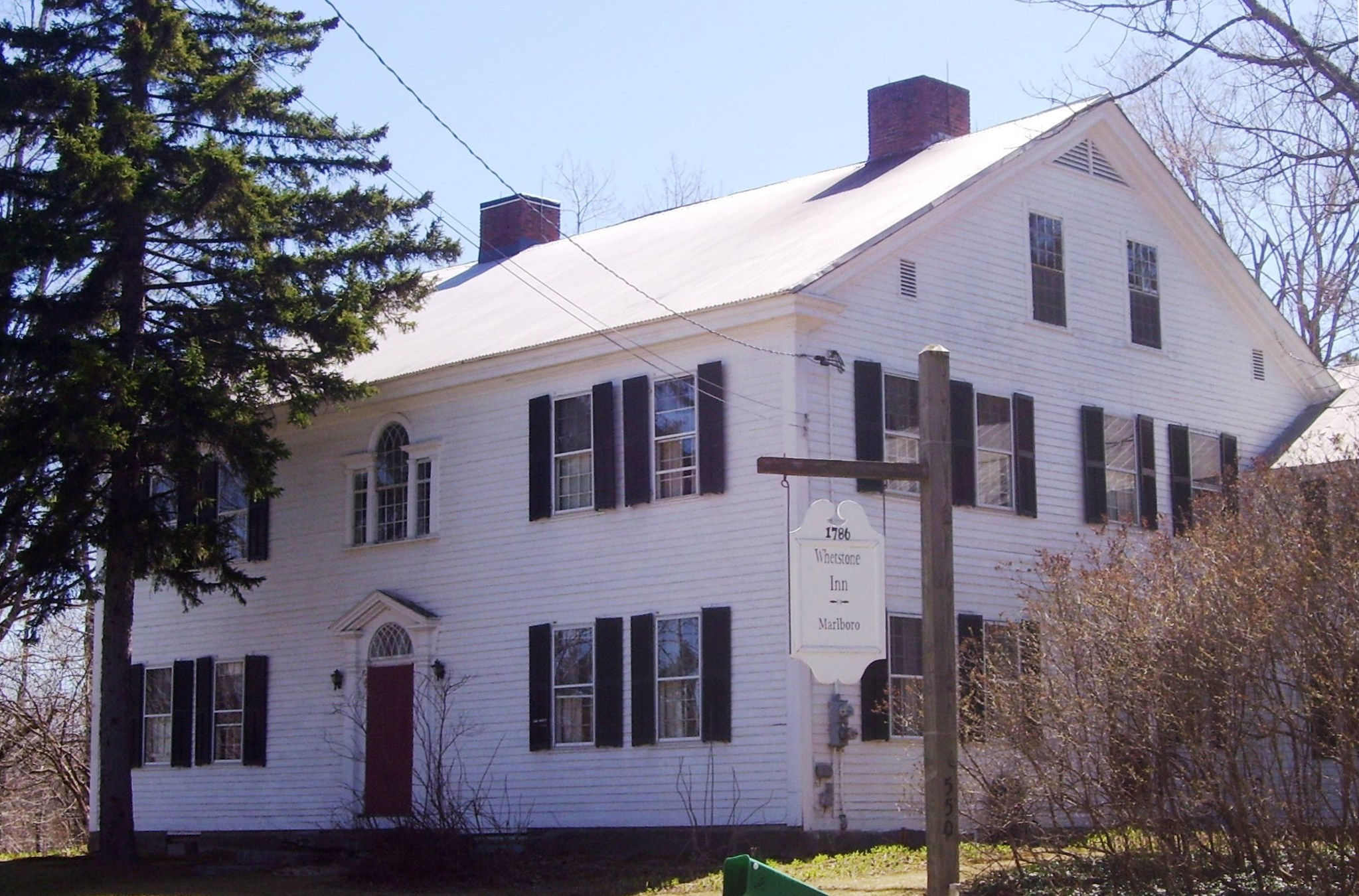
The Whetstone Inn, on the Town Common, was built c. 1775

In 1946, Marlboro College was founded on the site of three farms by Walter Hendricks, for returning World War II veterans, with poet Robert Frost as its first trustee. The Marlboro Music School and Festival, founded in 1951, is held each summer on the former college campus.

=== 21st century ===
In 2006, Marlboro was one of the first American towns to have its citizens pass a resolution endorsing the impeachment of President George W. Bush, and in 2011 it was one of thirteen Vermont towns isolated by flooding caused by Hurricane Irene.

== Geography ==
According to the United States Census Bureau, the town has a total area of 40.7 square miles (105.3 km^{2}), of which 40.3 square miles (104.5 km^{2}) is land and 0.3 square mile (0.8 km^{2}) (0.79%) is water. Marlboro is drained by the western branch of the West River, Whetstone Brook and the Green River.

The town is crossed by Vermont Route 9, also known as the "Molly Stark Trail".

== Demographics ==
Historical population
Census	Pop.	Note	%±
1790	629		—
1800	1,087		72.8%
1810	1,245		14.5%
1820	1,296		4.1%
1830	1,218		−6.0%
1840	1,027		−15.7%
1850	896		−12.8%
1860	741		−17.3%
1870	665		−10.3%
1880	553		−16.8%
1890	495		−10.5%
1900	448		−9.5%
1910	442		−1.3%
1920	300		−32.1%
1930	255		−15.0%
1940	225		−11.8%
1950	311		38.2%
1960	347		11.6%
1970	592		70.6%
1980	695		17.4%
1990	924		32.9%
2000	978		5.8%
2010	1,078		10.2%
2020	1,722		59.7%
U.S. Decennial Census

As of the census of 2000, there were 978 people, 330 households, and 215 families residing in the town. The population density was 24.3 people per square mile (9.4/km^{2}). There were 497 housing units at an average density of 12.3 per square mile (4.8/km^{2}). The racial makeup of the town was 96.32% White, 0.20% African American, 0.20% Native American, 1.02% Asian, 0.41% Pacific Islander, 0.72% from other races, and 1.12% from two or more races. Hispanic or Latino of any race were 0.82% of the population.

There were 330 households, out of which 30.6% had children under the age of 18 living with them, 55.8% were married couples living together, 6.1% had a female householder with no husband present, and 34.8% were non-families. 25.5% of all households were made up of individuals, and 10.0% had someone living alone who was 65 years of age or older. The average household size was 2.39 and the average family size was 2.90.

In the town, the population was spread out, with 19.0% under the age of 18, 23.3% from 18 to 24, 20.1% from 25 to 44, 27.5% from 45 to 64, and 10.0% who were 65 years of age or older. The median age was 37 years. For every 100 females, there were 96.0 males. For every 100 females age 18 and over, there were 90.4 males.

The median income for a household in the town was $41,429, and the median income for a family was $44,861. Males had a median income of $30,313 versus $25,673 for females. The per capita income for the town was $19,503. About 0.9% of families and 3.9% of the population were below the poverty line, including 1.9% of those under age 18 and 7.6% of those age 65 or over.

== Education ==
Marlboro School replaced a number of one-room schoolhouses in 1954. It educated students from kindergarten to eighth grade until its closure in 2026. Families can now choose from other regional public schools and approved independent schools.

== Media ==
Marlboro is home to the WRSY-FM, 101.5, radio station.

== Site of interest ==
- Southern Vermont Natural History Museum
- The Campus at Marlboro Music

== Notable people ==
- Newel Knight, Mormon religious leader
- Richard Lewontin, biologist and treasurer of the Marlboro Historical Society
- Margaret MacArthur, folk historian and musician
- Joseph Mazur, professor of mathematics
- Blanche Honegger Moyse, conductor
- Louis Moyse, flute player and composer
- Edson B. Olds, U.S. Congressman
- Tasha Tudor, author and illustrator of children's books
- Newel K. Whitney, businessman, prominent in the Latter Day Saint movement

== See also ==
- Marlboro Music School and Festival
