= Greif =

Greif (German for Griffin) may refer to:

- Greif (surname)
- Greif, Inc., a Fortune 1000 company
- Operation Greif, a German infiltration operation using English-speaking troops during the Battle of the Bulge
- Heinkel He 177 Greif, a German heavy bomber during World War II
- Torgelower SV Greif a German football team
- Greif (brigantine)
- SMS Greif, several ships of the German and Austro-Hungarian navies
- German torpedo boat Greif, 1925–1944
- Greif was the name of Erwin Rommel's command vehicle, an Sd.Kfz. 250/3 during his command of the Afrika Korps during World War II
- Badener Greifs, an American football team from Karlsruhe, Germany
- Greif, a 2024 album by Zeal & Ardor

== See also ==
- Greiff (disambiguation)
- Griffin
- Grief
