= Valéry Aubertin =

French organist, composer and choir conductor

- Born: June 3, 1970 (age 56); Lagny-sur-Marne, France
- Education: Conservatoire de Paris
- Occupations: organist, composer, choir conductor
- Employer(s): Conservatoire à rayonnement départemental du Val Maubuée, Conservatoire à rayonnement régional de Nantes
- Known for: contemporary classical music, choral conducting
- Notable work: La nuit des nuits, ...et le soleil se déchirait

Valéry Aubertin (born 3 June 1970) is a contemporary French organist, composer and choir conductor.

== Biography ==
Born in Lagny-sur-Marne, Aubertin was a student in the organ class of Michèle Guyard at the Aubervilliers conservatory. He ended his studies with a First Prize of organ and another first prize of music formation.

From 1989 to 1995, he attended the Conservatoire de Paris where he won several first prizes. Among others, he was a student of Brigitte François-Sappey (history of music and orchestration), and Gérard Grisey (musical composition).

From 1995 to 1997, he worked with Jean-Louis Florentz (composition). In 1993, he won the Special Jury Prize at the Composition Competition of the International Society of Organbuilders in Montréal (Canada), with a work for organ La nuit des nuits (in Le Livre Ouvert, Op.6). In 1995, his first symphonic work ...et le soleil se déchirait, Op.7 received, unanimously by the jury and ahead of 216 entries from all over the world, the First Prize of the 40th International Composition Competition of the City of Trieste, 32nd symphonic edition (Trieste, Italy 1995).

He is a professor of musical analysis, musical training and composition at the Conservatoire à rayonnement départemental du Val Maubuée. Since 2013, he has been teaching composition at the Conservatoire à rayonnement régional de Nantes.

Valéry Aubertin was organist at the Saint-Denis church in Quincy-Voisins from 1989 to 2011. He is the choir director of the "Ensemble Vocale Anguelos", located in this very city.

== Principal works ==
- Works for organ
  - Le Livre Ouvert, for organ (15 pieces of various sizes)
    - Miserere
    - Triptyque pénitentiel
    - Passion
    - Te lucis ante terminum
    - Lunaire
    - Variations
    - Improvisation - Kandinsky 1914
    - Sonatine pour les étoiles
    - Vincent van Gogh - Les Fresques - Lamento, symphonic poem
    - Cadran lunaire
    - La Nuit des Nuits
    - Liebeslied
    - Le Temps déborde
    - La Nuit remue
    - In n'y a plus de profondeur ni de surface
  - Six notations, for organ (1991–92)
  - 2e Livre d'Orgue composed of four sonatas. These four sonatas are structured in several movements with strong logical and poetic links between them.
    - 1st Sonata
    - 2nd Sonata
    - 3rd Sonata
    - 4th Sonata. This sonata is inspired by different episodes of Dante's Divine Comedy. It is thus articulated in three movements: Hell (subdivided into four parts), Purgatory (subdivided into two parts) and, in conclusion, Paradise.
      - Ma l'ombra sol.
      - Trois études
      - Unruhe
      - Passage de l'oubli
      - 5th Sonata
- Instrumental works
  - Livre pour guitare
    - Seuil
    - 1st Sonata
    - 2nd Sonata
    - Ausklang
  - Sonata for clarinet and piano.
  - Études-tableaux for piano
  - La nuit incandescente for piano
  - Da flogen wir for violin
- Vocal works
  - Missa brevis pro defunctis poetis
  - Madrigali
  - Stabat Mater
  - Dialogue du silence avec le silence
  - Ornières
  - Vent nocturne
  - Office secret
  - Élégie de Ronsard
- Symphonic works
  - Et le soleil se déchirait, 22 pieces for orchestra, which in 1995 won first prize at the International Composition Competition of Trieste in Italy.
  - Une Aurore
  - Lever du Jour
  - Quatre bagatelles
  - Symphonie I, for 10 instruments

Valéry Aubertin's works are available in the following publishing houses: Billaudot, Chanteloup-Musique and Europart.

== Sources ==
- Heddo Heide, Orgelmusik auf neuen Pfaden, in "Ars Organi" - 2005, Josefstraße 8, 66693 Mettlach, Germany.
- Éric Lebrun, article about Valéry Aubertin, in Guide de la musique d'orgue, under the direction of Gilles Cantagrel, Fayard - 2012
- Être compositeur, être compositrice en France au XXIe, Éric Tissier, L'Harmattan, Paris, 2009.
