= Guillaume Lasceux =

French organist, improviser and composer

Guillaume Lasceux (3 February 1740 - 1831) was a French organist, improviser and composer.

== Biography ==
Born in Poissy, Lasceux began his career as an organist in the parish of St-Martin of Chevreuse in 1758. He moved to Paris in 1762 to study music composition for five years with Charles Noblet, organist and harpsichordist of the Opera. He succeeded him to the Mathurins in 1769. In the same year, he was appointed organist at St-Aure, and 10 years later, at the Minimes convent, Place Royale, with similar posts at the College of Navarre and the Magloire Seminary.

In 1769, he replaced Claude-Nicolas Ingrain on the organ of the Saint-Étienne-du-Mont church, of which he officially became titular in 1774. During the Revolution, he lost most of his posts and had to earn a living by accompanying the theophilantropic ceremonies in Saint-Étienne-du-Mont, converted into a "Temple of Branch piety". He resumed his organist's post in 1803, after the restoration of Catholic worship there, and retired on 2 January 1819.

Recognized as a virtuoso on the organ, harpsichord or forte-piano, Lasceux became famous for his improvisations inspired by the Last Judgement.

== Works ==
His work includes vocal pieces, chamber music and numerous organ pieces.

- 1767: Romances, including Hommage à l’amour, Absence et retour, Les adieux de la violette.
- 1768: Sonates pour le Forte-Piano, violin ad lib. (Book 1).
- 1772: Journal de pièces d'orgue contenant des messes, Magnificat et noëls (unpublished) - Sonates pour le Forte-Piano (Book 2).
- 1775: Quatuor Op. 4 for fortepiano, 2 violins and cello.
- c. 1775: Ariettes et petits airs.
- 1783: Nouveau Journal de pièces d’orgue, no 1, Messe des Grands Solennels.
- 1783: Pot-pourri d’airs connus for harpsichord, Op. 9.
- 1785: Nouveau Journal de pièces d’orgue, no 2, Magnificat in F major, no 3, Trois noëls variés pour l’orgue ou le clavecin.
- c. 1789: Les époux réconciliés (operatic comedy).
- 1804: Messe for choir and orchestra.
- 1809: Essai théorique et pratique sur l’art de l’orgue (manuscript), with 26 musical examples of all kinds with registrations.
- 1812: Nouvelle suite de pièces d’orgue: 1. Messe des annuels et grands solennels, 2. Hymnes, proses et répons de l’office de la Fête-Dieu, 3. Messe des solennels mineurs (perdu).
- 1819: Annuaire de l’organiste.
- 1820: 12 Fugues for organ.
- Posth. : 2 Motets au Saint Sacrement.

== See also ==
- French organ school

== Sources ==
- Brigitte François-Sappey, Guillaume Lasceux, Guide de la musique d'orgue, dir. Gilles Cantagrel, Paris, Fayard, series Les Indispensables de la musique, 2012, (pp. 609–611).
- Eileen Morris Guenther, "Lasceux, Guillaume." Grove Music Online. Oxford Music Online. 17 Jul. 2009.
- Guillaume Lasceux, Essai théorique et pratique (1809); introduction by Jean Saint-Arroman, fac-simile Jean-Marc Fuzeau, series Dominantes, Bressuire (France), 2011.
- Guillaume Lasceux. Annuaire de l’Organiste (1819); introduction by Jean Saint-Arroman, fac-simile Jean-Marc Fuzeau, series Dominantes, Courlay (France), 2006.
