= Greif (surname) =

Greif is a surname. Notable people with the surname include:

- Avner Greif, American economist
- Dominik Greif, Slovak footballer
- Eric Greif, Canadian-American lawyer and entertainment personality
- Gideon Greif, historian of the Holocaust
- Jean-Jacques Greif, French journalist and writer
- Mark Greif, American author, editor, educator and cultural critic
- Martin Greif, American writer
- Olivier Greif, French composer
- Stephen Greif, English actor
- Tatjana Greif (born 1966), Slovenian politician
