= Éric Lebrun =

Éric Maurice Lebrun (born 19 November 1967) is a French composer, organist, musicologist, and author.

His wife, Marie-Ange Leurent, is also an organist.

== Biography ==
Born in Talence (Gironde), he was a former student of Gaston Litaize and Michel Chapuis, Lebrun also benefited from the teaching of Anne-Marie Barat, a pupil of André Marchal, of organists Daniel Roth, Michel Bouvard, Olivier Latry and pianist Bruno Rigutto.

Lebrun completed his training in the classes of harmony, counterpoint, orchestration, musical analysis and history of music at the Conservatoire de Paris. In addition to the first prize for organ, he won three first prizes and the music history diploma.

After his Grand Prix de Chartres in 1990, he was appointed to the Église Saint-Antoine-des-Quinze-Vingts in Paris. Since 1990, he was successively a lecturer at the Sorbonne, professor at the Conservatoire de Paris, director of the École nationale de musique et de danse of Cachan, then professor of organ at the Conservatoire of Angers and that of Saint-Maur-des-Fossés. In 2015, he inaugurated the organ class of the Pôle Sup 93. A renowned pedagogue (he founded the organ didactics course at the Conservatoire de Paris), he contributed to the training of many young generation interpreters, several of whom won international competitions. Lebrun is Honorary Professor at the Royal Conservatory of Aarhus in Denmark and has regularly taught in the Netherlands and England (Zwolle, London...). He founded the international academies of Nemours (with André Isoir), Issenheim in Alsace (with Marie-Ange Leurent), Sarlat, then Bourron-Marlotte-Nemours-Fontainebleau.

Lebrun recorded at the organ the complete works of Jehan Alain, Maurice Duruflé, César Franck, as well as those by Alexandre Boëly, Dietrich Buxtehude, and Gaston Litaize. In 2015, he began to record the complete organ works Johann Sebastian Bach, with his wife Marie-Ange Leurent.

He is the author of several books, including three biographies devoted to Buxtehude (2006), Boëly (with Brigitte François-Sappey, 2008), César Franck (2011) and Johann Sebastian Bach (2016) at Bleu Nuit, as well as a contribution to the new version of the "Guide de la Musique d'Orgue" (Fayard 2012). In 2018, he published a new biography of Claude Debussy.

Lebrun is the dedicatee of several contemporary works, and has premiered pieces by Valéry Aubertin, Jacques Castérède, Thierry Escaich, Kamilló Lendvay and Gaston Litaize, among others.

He is an expert member of the National Commission of Historic Monuments (fifth section). For two years he was president of the Syndicat National des Artistes Musiciens des Cultes.

Lebrun has composed about forty scores for various formations ranging from solo instrument to oratorio for choir and orchestra.

== Discography ==
=== List of recordings as soloist ===
- Jehan Alain: Complete organ works (2 CDs Naxos Records)
- Johann Sebastian Bach's Kirnberger chorals (1 CD Solstice)
- Claude Balbastre's four Christmas suites in variations (1 CD Solstice)
- Maurice Duruflé: Complete organ work and sacred music (2 CDs Naxos)
- César Franck: Complete organ work (2 CDs Naxos)
- Éric Lebrun':Dixième Mystère du Rosaire (in "neuf jeunes organistes compositeurs", 1 CD Hortus)
- Henri Mulet: Esquisses byzantines (and Guy Ropartz: Prélude funèbre, introduction and allegro, Prière pour les trépassés, Les cloches de Lanloup) (1 CD JAV recordings – U.S.A.)
- Dmitri Yanov-Yanovsky, Organ Concerto (with the other two keyboard concertos, performed by Jay Gottlieg, piano and Celine Frisch, harpsichord). Ensemble Musiques Nouvelles, direction Jean-Paul Dessy. (1 CD Le Chant du Monde)
- Éric Lebrun: Le livre de Notre-Dame, Motet pour l'Ascension, maîtrise de Notre-Dame de Paris, direction Émilie Fleury, Yves Castagnet, organ

=== List of recordings with Marie-Ange Leurent ===
- Dietrich Buxtehude: Complete organ works, grand prize of the Académie Charles Cros (set of 6 CDs Bayard Musique)
- Alexandre Boëly: Complete organ works, choc du Monde de la musique (set of 8 CDs Bayard Musique)
- Gaston Litaize: Complete organ work (set of 5 Cds Bayard Musique)
- Musique pour le temps de Noël at the great historical organs of Santa-Maria de Mahon (1 CD Solstice)
- Gaston Litaize: anthology (K617)
- Gaston Litaize: Douze pièces grand orgue, world premiere recording, foreword by Henri Dutilleux (1 CD K 617)
- Gaston Litaize: Vingt-quatre préludes liturgiques, world premiere recording (1 CD Solstice)
- Gaston Litaize: Missa solemnior, Cortège, Sonate à deux, Chant de Pâques (1 CD Solstice)
- Valéry Aubertin: Première et troisième sonate, sonatine pour les étoiles, Improvisation Kandinsky 1914 (set of 2 CDs, Disques du Triton with Valéry Auvertin, Michel Bourcier and Pierre Farago)
- Eric Lebrun: Vingt Mystères du Rosaire, for violin, cello, harp and Great organ, by André Garnier and Isabelle Lesage, violin, Philippe Bary, cello, Clara Izambert, harp, Lucie Flesch, Béatrice Piertot, Yannick Merlin, Marie-Ange Leurent and Éric Lebrun, organ. (2 CD Bayard Musique, 2010)
- Franz Liszt's Sacred works for organ, Marie-Ange Leurent and Éric Lebrun at the historical organ of Barr. (2 CDs Bayard Musique, 2010)
- Marie porte du Ciel: Marian anthology on the organ of Santa-Maria de Mahon, accompanied by motets interpreted by the Maîtrise de Dijon (1 CD Bayard-Musique 2011).
- J.S. Bach: Inventions and Sinfonies at the organ of Saint-Cyprien en Périgord (1 CD Bayard-Musique 2012)
- Mille ans de Noëls: from Perotin to Éric Lebrun at the organ of Villeneuve-sur-Yonne, (1 Cd Chanteloup-Musique 2013)
- Mozart: Organ works with Yves Fossaert de Bourron-Marlotte (1 CD Monthabor 2014)
- Funeral music at the organs of Bourron-Marlotte and Villeneuve-sur-Yonne (1 CD Monthabor 2014)
- The most beautiful pieces for organ (2 CDs Monthabor 2014)
- J.S. Bach: The Art of Fugue (2 CDs Monthabor 2015)
- J.S. Bach: Complete organ works vol 1: Partitas, Chorals of Arnstadt (2 CDs Monthabor-Chanteloup-Musique 2016)
- J.S. Bach: Complete organ works vol 2: Orgelbüchlein, Chorals Kirnberger (2 CDs Monthabor-Chanteloup-Musique 2016)
- J.S. Bach: Complete organ works vol 3: Clavier Übung, Chorals divers (2 CDs Monthabor-Chanteloup-Musique 2017)
- J.S. Bach: Complete organ works vol 4: Leipzig chorals, various Chorals (2 CDs Monthabor-Chanteloup-Musique 2017)
