= List of compositions by Jean Guillou =

Jean Guillou was a French composer, organist, pianist, and pedagogue. Titular Organist at Saint Eustache from 1963 to 2015, he was known worldwide as a composer of instrumental and vocal music focused on the organ, improviser, and adviser to organ builders. For several decades, he held regular master classes in Zurich and in Paris.

== Organ solo ==
- Fantaisie, op. 1 (1952. Mainz: Schott, 2005)
- 18 Variations, op. 3 (1956. Mainz: Schott, 2005)
- Sinfonietta, op. 4 (1958/revised in 2005. Mainz: Schott, 2005)
- Ballade Ossianique No. 1 ("Temora"), op. 8 (1962/1967 published by Leduc, Paris, as "Pour le tombeau de Colbert"/revised in 2005. Mainz: Schott, 2005)
- Toccata, op. 9 (1962/revised in 2004. Mainz: Schott, 2004)
- 6 Sagas, op. 20 (1970. Mainz: Schott, 2005)
- Ballade Ossianique No. 2 ("Les Chants de Selma"), op. 23 (1971/published in 1971 by Leduc, Paris, as "Allen"/revised in 2005. Mainz: Schott, 2005)
- La Chapelle des Abîmes, op. 26 (1973. Mainz: Schott, 2005)
- Scènes d'enfants, op. 28 (1974. Mainz: Schott, 2005)
- Jeux d'Orgue, op. 34 (1978. Vienna: Universal Edition, 1984)
- Suite pour Rameau, op. 36 (1979. Boston, MA: Wayne Leupold Editions, 1994)
- Saga No. 7, op. 38 (1983. Vienna: Universal Edition, 1984)
- Sonate en trio No. 1, op. 40 (1984. Paris: Durand, 1985)
- Chamades!, op. 41 (1984. USA: H. T. FitzSimons, 1984)
- Impromptu, for pedal solo op. 42 (1985. Vienna: Universal Edition, 1988)
- Hypérion ou la Rhétorique du Feu, op. 45 (1988. Boston, MA: Wayne Leupold Editions, 1996)
- Säya ou l'Oiseau Bleu, op. 50 (1993. Mainz: Schott, 2004)
- Éloge, op. 52 (1994. Boston, MA: Wayne Leupold Editions, 1995)
- Alice au pays de l'orgue for organ and narrator, op. 53 (1995. Mainz: Schott, 1998)
- Pensieri pour Jean Langlais, op. 54 (1995. USA: H. T. FitzSimons, 1996)
- Instants, op. 57 (1998. Mainz: Schott, 2015)
- Pièces furtives, op. 58 (1998. Mainz: Schott, 2000)
- Hymnus, op. 72 (in memoriam P. Japp Reuten) (2008. Mainz: Schott, 2009)
- Regard, op. 77 (2011. Mainz: Schott, 2013)
- Enfantines, op. 81 (2013. Mainz: Schott, 2015)
- Sonate en trio No. 2, op. 82 (2013. Mainz: Schott, 2014)
- Sonate en trio No. 3, op. 83 (2013. Mainz: Schott, 2014)
- Macbeth – Le lai de l'Ombre, op. 84 (2009. Mainz: Schott, 2016)
- Psyché, op. 87 (1978–2015. Unpublished.)
- Périple, op. 87 (2016. Unpublished.)
- Pensieri pour Claude Bernard, without Opus (Unpublished.)

== Organ with other instruments ==
- Colloque No. 2 for Organ and Piano, op. 11 (1956-1964/revised in 2005. Mainz: Schott, 2005)
- Colloque No. 4 for organ, piano and two percussionists, op. 15 (1966/revised in 2006. Mainz: Schott, 2006)
- Intermezzo for Flute and Organ, op. 17 (1969. Mainz: Schott, 2008)
- Symphonie Initiatique, op. 18:
  - Version for three organs (1969. Unpublished.)
  - Version for two organs (1990. Unpublished.)
  - Version for organ with two players (2009. Mainz: Schott, 2016)
- Colloque No. 5 for Organ and Piano, op. 19 (1969/revised in 2005. Mainz: Schott, 2005)
- Sonate for Trumpet or Violin and Organ, op. 25 (1972. Unpublished.)
- Concerto for Violin and Organ, op. 37 (1982. Unpublished.)
- Colloque No. 6 for Organ and two Percussionists, op. 47 (1989. Unpublished.)
- Fantaisie concertante for Violoncello and Organ, op. 49 (1991. Mainz: Schott, 2009)
- Fête for Clarinet and Organ, op. 55 (1995. Mainz: Schott, 2008)
- Écho for Flute, Clarinet, String quintet, Choir, Piano and Organ, op. 60 (1999. Mainz: Schott)
- L’Ébauche d’un souffle (Concerto for Trumpet and Organ), op. 64 (1985. Mainz: Schott, 2016)
- Colloque No. 7 (Concerto for Piano and Organ), op. 66 (1998. Mainz: Schott, 2011)
- Colloque No. 8 for Marimba and Organ, op. 67 (2002. Mainz: Schott, 2008)
- La Révolte des Orgues for eight portative organs, great organ, and percussion, op. 69 (2005. Mainz: Schott, 2007)
- Colloque No. 9 for organ and pan flute, op. 71 (2008. Mainz: Schott, 2009)
- Répliques for Great Organ and Positive Organ, op. 75 (2009, Mainz: Schott, 2011)
- Colloque No. 10 for solo trumpet, seven trumpets, organ and percussion, op. 86 (2016, Mainz: Schott, 2017)

== Organ and Orchestra ==
- Inventions (Organ concerto No. 1) for Organ and chamber orchestra, op. 7 (1960. Paris: Leduc, 1970)
- Concerto héroïque ( Organ concerto No. 2) for Organ and orchestra, op. 10 (1963/revised in 2005. Mainz: Schott, 2005)
- Organ Concerto No. 3 for Organ and string orchestra, op. 14 (1965. Paris: Leduc, 1972)
- Organ Concerto No. 4 for Organ and orchestra, op. 31 (1978. Unpublished.)
- Organ Concerto No. 5 ("Le Roi Arthur") for Organ and Brass quintet, op. 35 (1979/revised in 2010. Mainz: Schott, 2012)
- Concerto 2000 for Organ and large orchestra, op. 62, (2000. Mainz: Schott)
- Organ Concerto No. 6 for Organ and large orchestra, op. 68 (2002. Mainz: Schott)
- Organ Concerto No. 7 for Organ and orchestra, op. 70 (2006. Mainz: Schott, 2007)

== Orchestra ==
- Triptyque for string orchestra, without opus (Paris: Leduc, 1965)
- Le Jugement Dernier: Oratorio for choir, soloists, organ and orchestra (1965. Paris: Leduc, 1966)
- Piano Concerto No. 1 for Piano and orchestra, op. 16 (1969. Paris: Leduc)
- Judith-Symphonie for Mezzo-soprano and orchestra (Symphonie No. 1), op. 21 (1970. Mainz: Schott)
- Symphony No. 2 for string orchestra, op. 27 (1974. Mainz: Schott, 2005)
- Symphony No. 3 ("La Foule") for large orchestra and two guitars, op. 30 (1977. Unpublished.)
- Concerto grosso for Orchestra, op. 32 (1978/revised in 2008. Mainz: Schott)
- Piano Concerto No. 2 for Piano and orchestra, op. 44 (1986. Mainz: Schott)
- Trombone Concerto for Trombone solo, 4 trumpets, 3 trombones, 3 tubas and two percussionists, op. 48 (1990. Mainz: Schott)
- Fantaisie concertante for Violoncello and Orchestra, op. 49 (1991/revised in 2015. Mainz: Schott, 2016)
- Fête for Clarinet and orchestra, op. 55 (1995. Mainz: Schott)

== Chamber music ==
- Sonata Barocca for piano, oboe and flute, without opus (1944. Unpublished.)
- Colloque No. 1 for Flute, oboe, violin and piano, op. 2 (1956. Mainz: Schott, 2005)
- Cantilia for Piano, Harp, Timpani and 4 Celli, op. 6 (1960. Paris, Leduc, 1968)
- Colloque No. 3 for Oboe, Harp, Celesta, Percussion, 4 Celli and 2 double Basses, op. 12 (1964. Paris: Leduc, 1968)
- Quatuor for Oboe and string quartet, op. 22 (1971. Schott 2016)
- Cantiliana for Flute (or violin) and piano, op. 24 (1972. Mainz: Schott 2014)
- Poème de la Main for Lyric soprano and piano, op. 29 (1975. Mainz: Schott, 2016)
- Trio for 3 Violoncelli (excerpt from Diderot à corps perdu), op. 59 (1999. Unpublished.)
- Co-incidence for Violin solo, op. 63 (2001. Mainz: Schott, 2010)
- Epitases, op. 65:
  - Version for pedal piano (Double Piano Borgato) (2002. Unpublished.)
  - Version for two pianos (2002. Mainz: Schott, 2013)
- Chronique for Percussion Trio, op. 73 (2009. Unpublished.)
- Impulso for Flute solo, op. 74 (2009. Mainz: Schott, 2015)
- Poème for 4 hands Piano and Percussion, op. 78 (2012. Mainz: Schott, 2014)
- Main menue for Mezzo-Soprano and Piano, op. 80 (2012. Unpublished.)

== Piano solo ==
- Première Sonate, op. 5 (1958. Paris: Amphion, 1974)
- Toccata, op. 9b (arranged for piano solo) (1962. Mainz: Schott, 2005)
- Deuxième Sonate, op. 33 (1978. Unpublished.)
- Deux Pièces: Nocturne et Impromptu, op. 56 (1967. Mainz: Schott, 2015)
- Augure, op. 61 (1999. Mainz: Schott, 2005)
- Valse oubliée, op. 79 (2012. Mainz: Schott, 2012)
- Troisième Sonate, op. 88 (2014–2018. Unpublished.)
- Variations, without opus (Unpublished.)

== Vocal works ==
- L'Infinito for Bass and Organ, op. 13 (1965. Mainz: Schott, 2005)
- Andromède for Soprano and Organ, op. 39 (1984, rev. 1990. Mainz: Schott, 2007)
- Peace for mixed Choir (8 voices) and Organ, op. 43 (1985. Mainz: Schott, 2012)
- Aube for mixed Choir (12 voices) and Organ, op. 46 (1988. Mainz: Schott, 2016)
- Missa Interrupta for Soprano, Organ, Brass quintet, Percussion and Choir, op. 51 (1995. Mainz: Schott)
- Echo for mixed choir and small orchestra (1999. Mainz: Schott)
- Ihr Himmel, Luft und Wind for 8 voices Choir, op. 76 (2010, Mainz: Schott, 2010)
- Stabat Mater for Organ, Soli and Orchestra, op. 85 (1985–2015. Unpublished.)

== Various works ==
- Diderot à corps perdu (1978. Unpublished.)
- Cadenzas for concertos by Handel, C. Ph. E. Bach, Mozart, Widor (Mainz: Schott, 2017)
- Pièces brèves pour l’émission "Échappée par le ciel" (Unpublished.)
- Cadenza for Chromatic Fantasia and Fugue BWV 903 by J. S. Bach (Unpublished.)

== Transcriptions for organ ==
- Johann Sebastian Bach: Musical Offering BWV 1079 (Transcription from 1952. Mainz: Schott, 2005)
- Johann Sebastian Bach: Goldberg Variations BWV 988 (Unpublished)
- Johann Sebastian Bach: Sarabande from Partita for lute – BWV 997 (Unpublished)
- Johann Sebastian Bach: Badinerie from the orchestra suite no. 2 BWV 1067 (Unpublished)
- George Frideric Handel: Alla Hornpipe from "Water Music" (Mainz: Schott, 2014)
- Franz Liszt: Fantaisie et fugue sur le nom de BACH (syncretic version from 1977) (Mainz: Schott, 2005)
- Franz Liszt: Orpheus (Transcription from 1976. Mainz: Schott, 2005)
- Franz Liszt: Prometheus (Mainz: Schott, 2008)
- Franz Liszt: Valse oubliée No. 1 (Mainz: Schott, 2007)
- Franz Liszt: Psalm XIII (Mainz: Schott, 2009)
- Franz Liszt: Tasso (Mainz: Schott, 2012)
- Wolfgang Amadeus Mozart: Adagio and Fugue in C minor K. 546 (Paris: Éditions Musicales Amphion)
- Wolfgang Amadeus Mozart: Adagio and Rondo in C minor K. 617 (Paris: Éditions Musicales Amphion)
- Modest Mussorgsky: Pictures at an Exhibition (Transcription from 1988. Mainz: Schott, 2005)
- Sergei Prokofiev: March from the opera "The Love for three oranges" (Bonn: Robert Forberg)
- Sergei Prokofiev: Toccata op. 11 (Bonn: Robert Forberg)
- Sergei Rachmaninoff: Symphonic Dances op. 45 – Version for two organs and for four hands and feet (Mainz: Schott, 2015)
- Igor Stravinsky: Three dances from "Petrouchka" (Transcription from 1968. Unpublished.)
- Pyotr Ilyich Tchaikovsky: "Scherzo" from Symphony No. 6 ("Pathétique") (Mainz: Schott, 2006)
- Pyotr Ilyich Tchaikovsky: Dance of the Sugar Plum Fairy from the Nutcracker Suite (Mainz: Schott, 2014)
- Giuseppe Verdi: "Quattro Pezzi Sacri: Te Deum and Stabat Mater"
- Antonio Vivaldi: Concerto in D major (Paris: Éditions Musicales Amphion)
- Antonio Vivaldi: Concerto in D minor (Mainz: Schott, 2014)

== Bibliography ==
- Abbing, Jörg. Jean Guillou – Colloques – Biografie und Texte. St. Augustin, Germany: Dr. Josef Butz Musikverlag, 2006. ISBN 3-928412-02-7.
- L'ORGUE n° 281: numéro spécial sur Jean Guillou, sous la direction de Sylviane Falcinelli, 2008.
- Cantagrel, Gilles. "Jean Guillou", in Guide de la musique d’orgue, edited by Gilles Cantagrel. Paris: Fayard, (1991) 2012, pp. 514–520.
- Cook, Mary Jean. "Errata in the published organ works of Jean Guillou", in The Diapason 67 (May 1976): 4–5.
- Hodant, Jean-Philippe. Rhétorique et Dramaturgie dans l'œuvre musicale de Jean Guillou Paris, France: Université Sorbonne, 1993.
- Orengia, Jean-Louis. Jean Guillou, interprète, compositeur et improvisateur. Mémoire de maîtrise de musicologie. Paris: Sorbonne, 1981/1982.
- Rhodes, Cherry. "Introducing Jean Guillou", in The A.G.O.R.C.C.O. Magazine (March 1974): 29 and 53.
- Terry, Mickey Thomas. "An Interview with Jean Guillou" in The American Organist 28, No. 4 (April 1994): 56–59.
- VV.AA. '"Regards". Hommages à Jean Guillou – Augure éditions, Paris 2014.
