= Hanse Sail =

Annual maritime festival in Rostock, Germany

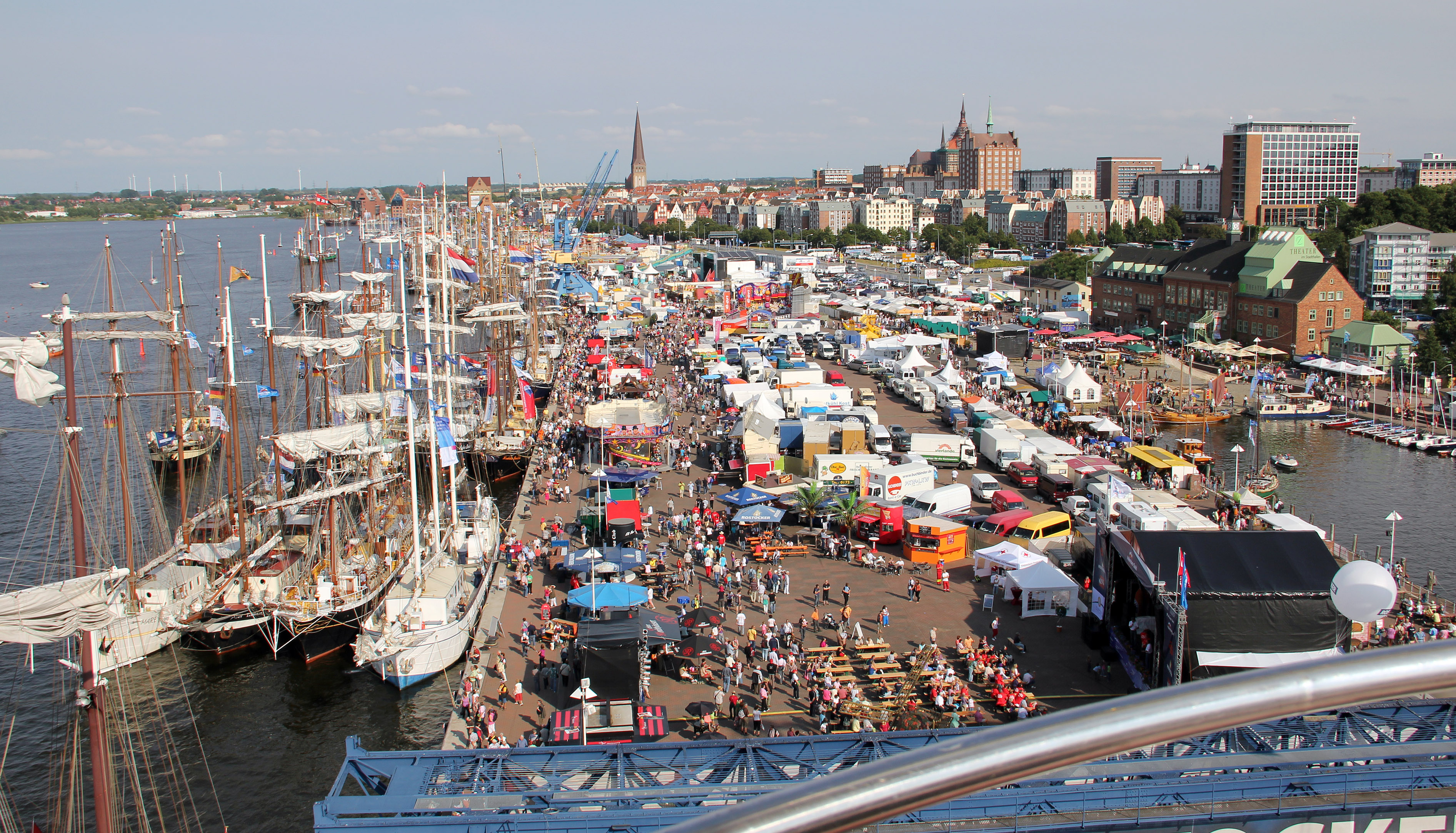
City harbour of Rostock during Hanse Sail 2010

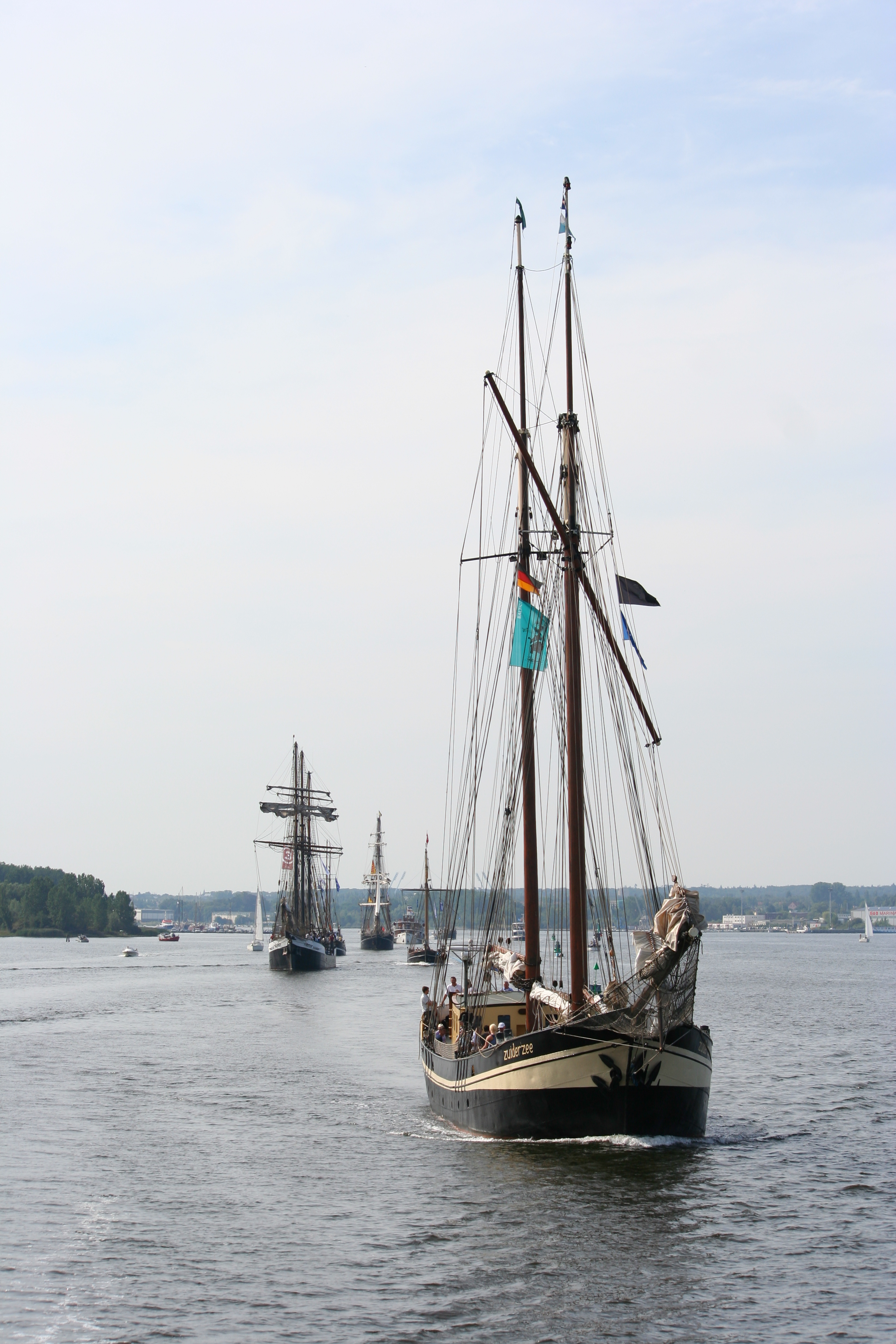
Zuiderzee at Hanse Sail 2009

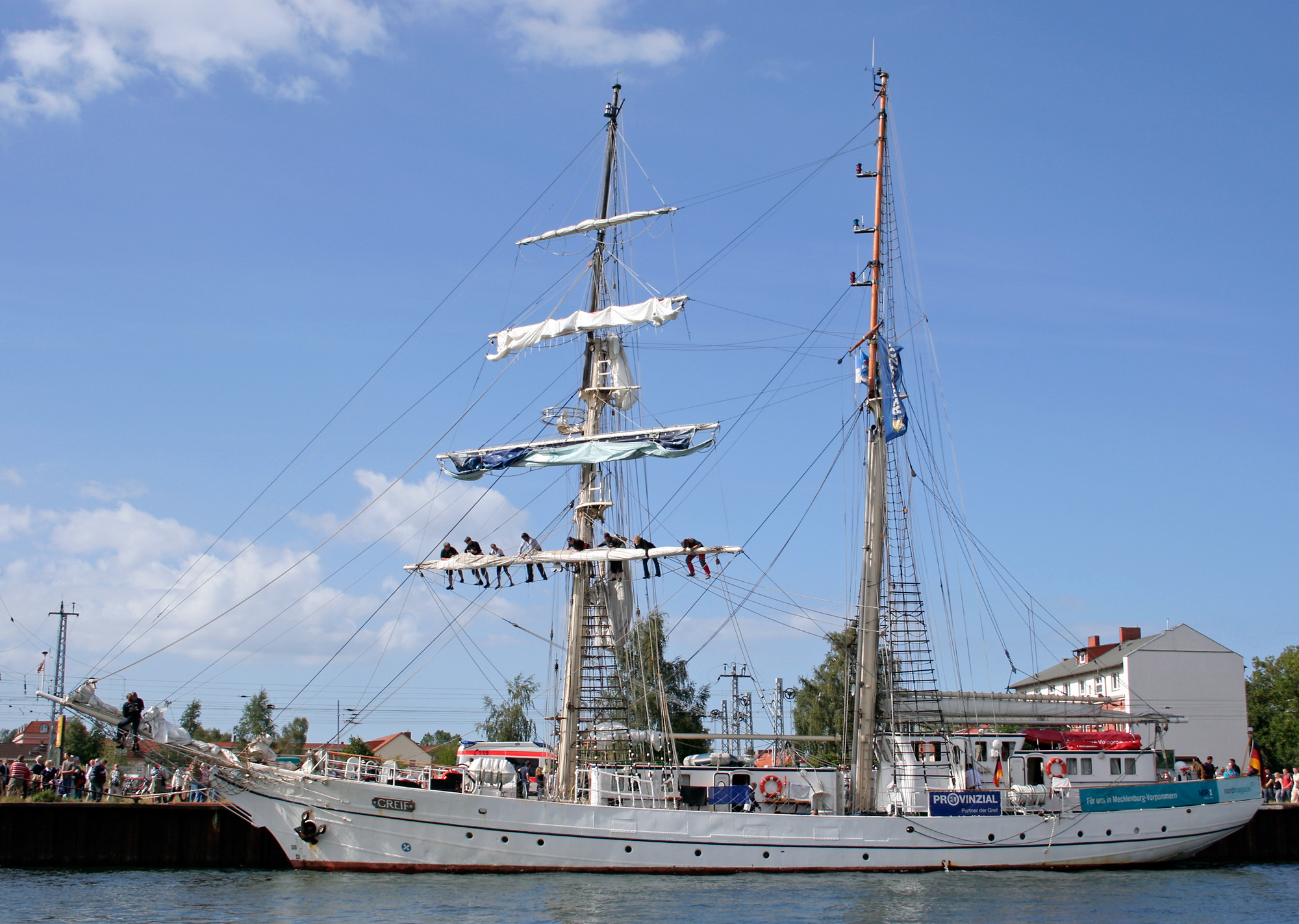
Greif at "Hanse Sail 2008"

The Hanse Sail in Rostock is the largest maritime festival in Mecklenburg (Germany) and one of the largest in Europe.

About 250 traditional sailing ships of all types and sizes from a vast variety of countries visit the coast of the city of Rostock every year during the second weekend of August. Today, the Hanse Sail forms part of the joint Baltic Sail, which takes place in several countries bordering the Baltic Sea during July and August.

== History ==
The first Hanse Sail took place between 22 and 28 July 1991. Despite initial skepticism, the first Hanse Sail turned out to be a great success. This might have been mainly due to enthusiasm sparked by the German reunification, as the sea border was open for the first time in decades.

Main attractions in past years were German Navy's training ship Gorch Fock, the Alexander von Humboldt (ship) and the Peace from Jamaica.

Every Hanse Sail is usually opened by prominent personalities of the time such as Gerhard Schröder or Wolfgang Thierse. This underlines the importance of the event, also for the local tourism industry.

== Overview ==
Every year about 1 million visitors visit the Hanse Sail. Even though it is accompanied by other cultural events, the ships remain the center of the festival. Besides watching ships, it is also possible to sail on them or enter them while they are anchored.

Many cruise ships head for the cruise port at Warnemünde during this time, because the shipping companies think that staying in Rostock during the Hanse Sail is a special highlight for their guests.

There are also sea planes and a helicopter parallel to the festival. They offer the opportunity to fly with them for about 20 minutes.

On the Saturday of the event there are fireworks in Warnemünde and the city harbour.

The 2015 Hanse Sail featured steam ships also, and the event occurred in August 2015. This was the 25th Hanse Sail since the start. (Hanse Sail Rostock 2015) It was predicted prior to the event that 250 sailing ships would attend Hanse Sail in 2015.

== Dates of Hanse Sails ==
- 2015: 6–9 August
- 2023: 10–13 August
- 2021: 5–8 August
- 2014: 6–10 August
- 2013: 8–11 August
- 2012: 9–12 August
- 2011: 11–14 August

== Panorama ==
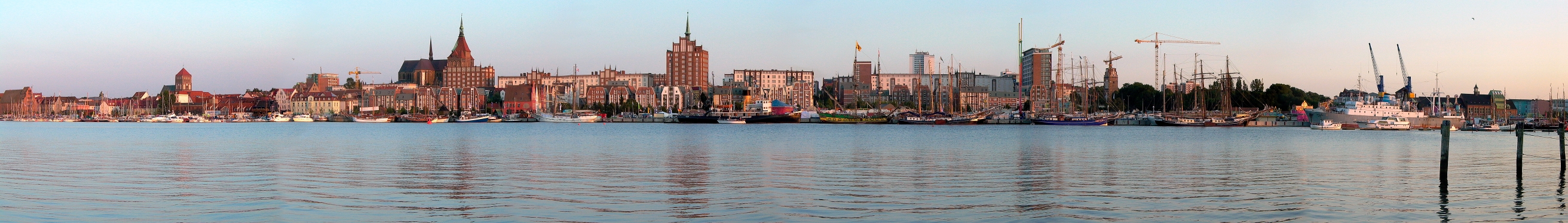
Panorama of a Hanse Sail from the Warnow coast

== Public transport ==
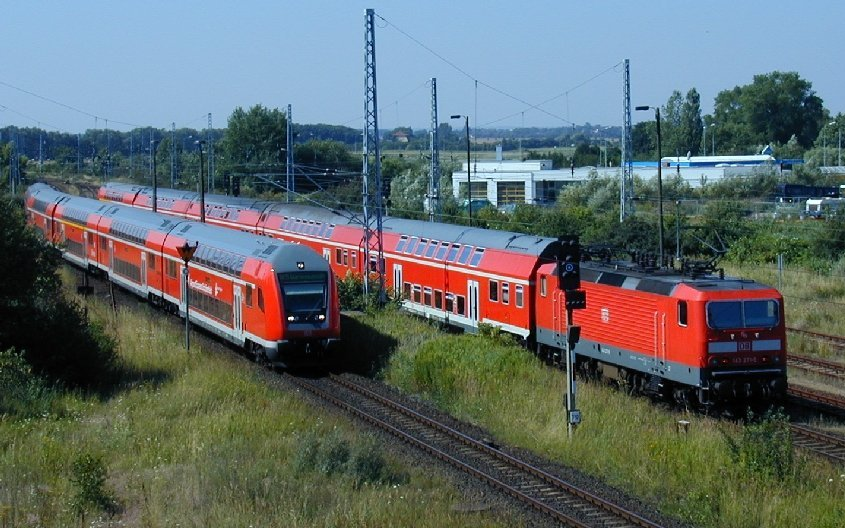
Expanded train service between Rostock and Warnemünde

Public transport is significantly increased during the event. Every 7.5 minutes, the S-Bahn plies between Rostock Hauptbahnhof (main station) and Warnemünde with up to five bilevel cars. Also many chartered trains come to Rostock, some even steam powered, and Deutsche Bahn operates extra trains.

The tram and bus services in Rostock operate a special timetable and on some nights go 24 hours non-stop. Due to limited parking lot capacity, a shuttle service with buses is offered to bring people to Warnemünde.

== Funding ==
Sponsors have included Hanseatische Brauerei Rostock (German brewery), Ostdeutscher Sparkassenverbund, and OstseeSparkasse Rostock. Further sources of revenue are letting of boat parking spaces and trading places on markets as well as commercial advertising.

The City of Rostock supports the Hanse Sail financially, because the city largely profits from the event. During the sail, most hotels are usually fully booked and visitors spend money in the town, in pubs and shops. Last, but not least, the sail is good promotion for Rostock and a good percentage of Hanse Sail visitors usually return for a holiday.

== Gallery ==
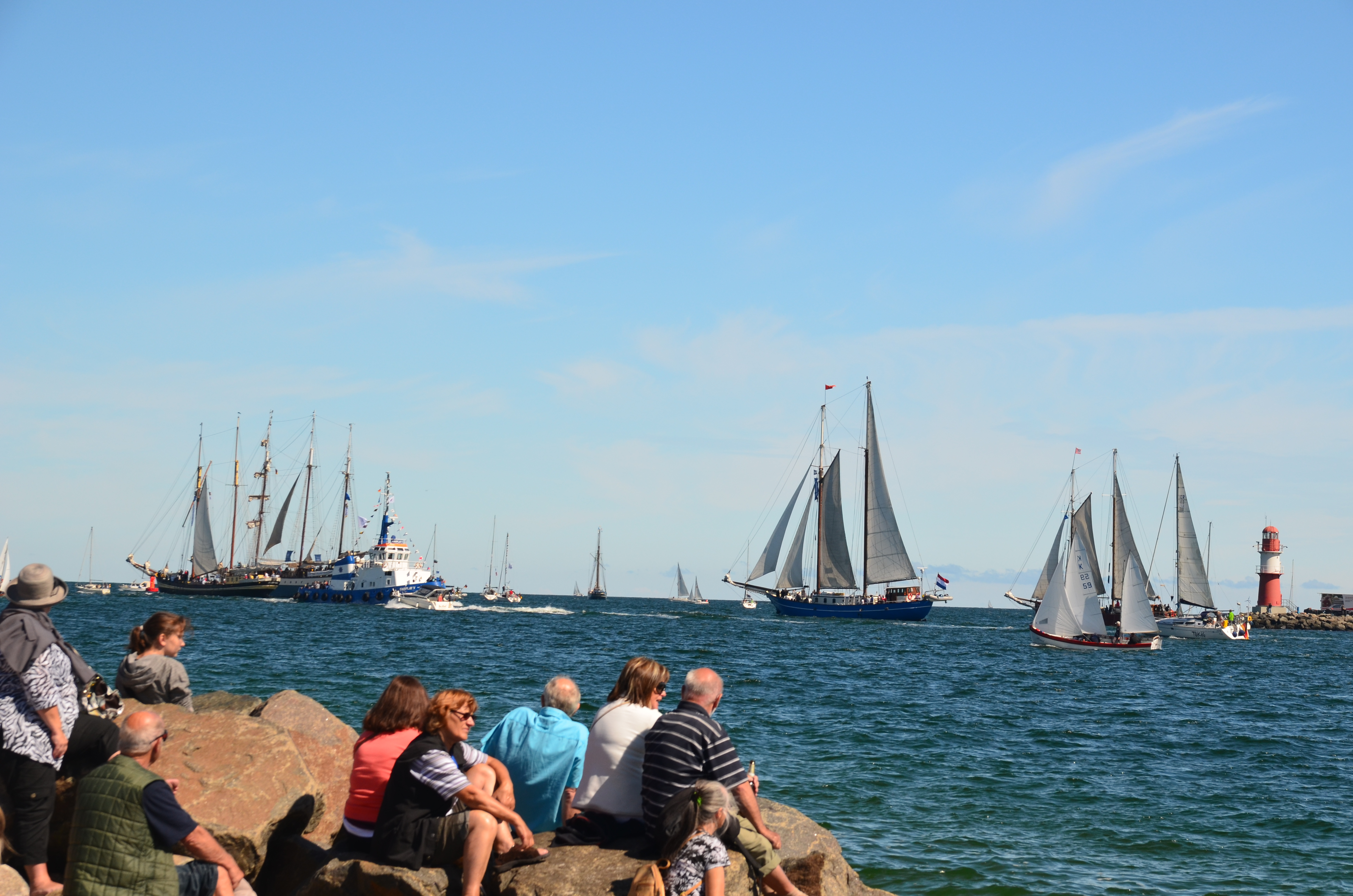
Spectators at the 22nd Hanse Sail in 2012 (Warnemünde)

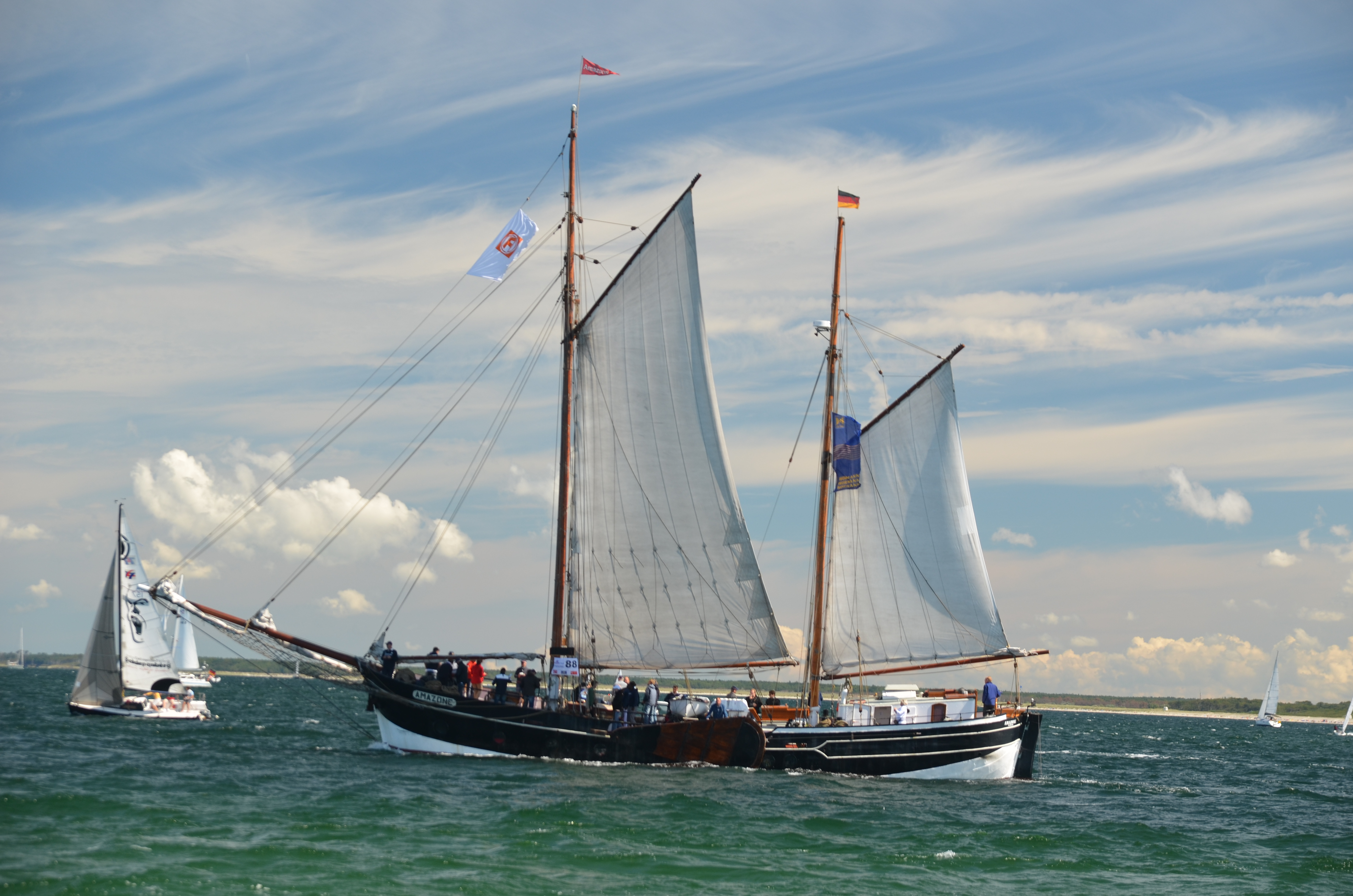
Ship Amazone (1909), Hanse Sail 2012

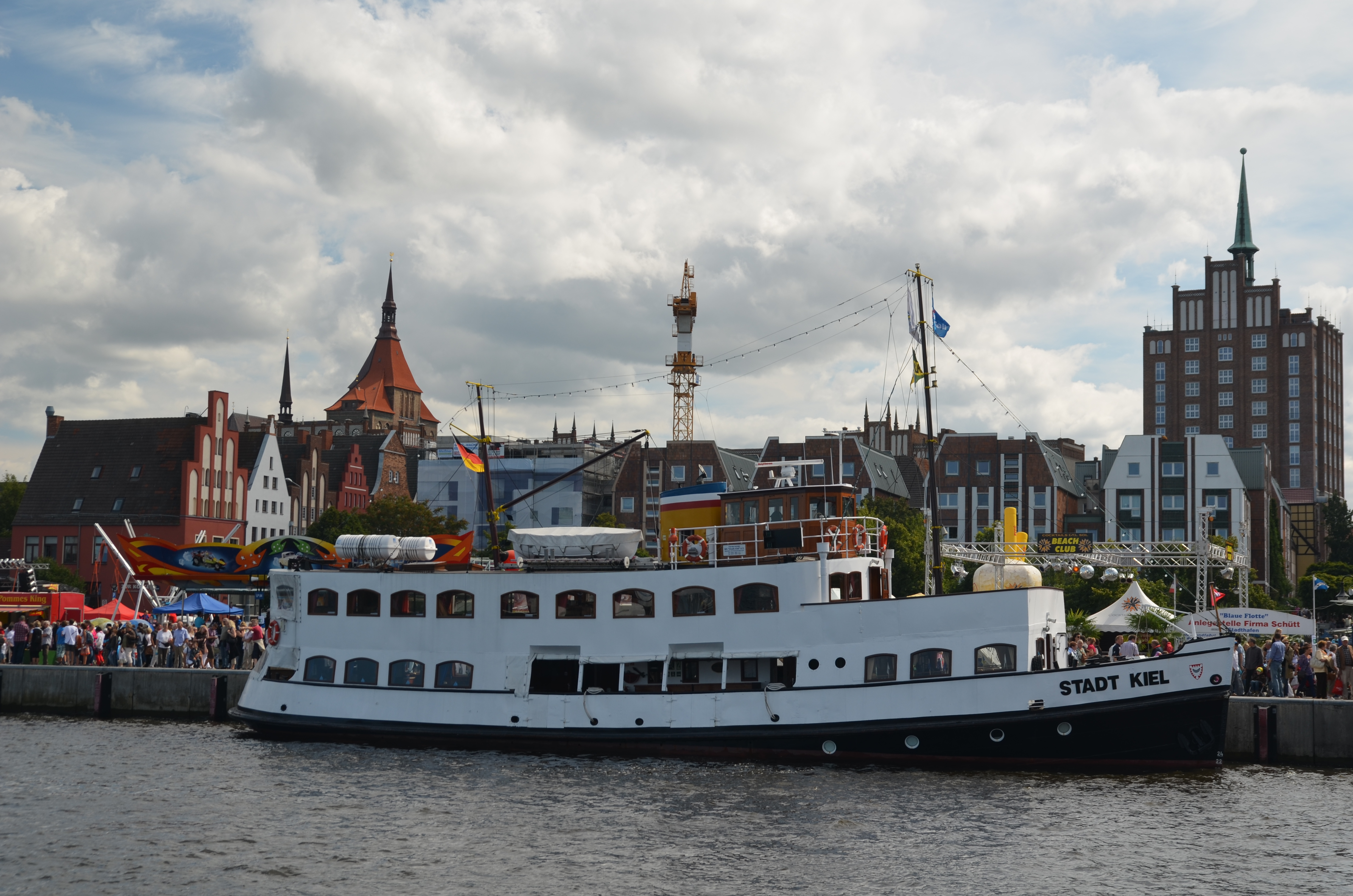
City Harbour Rostock, Hanse Sail 2012

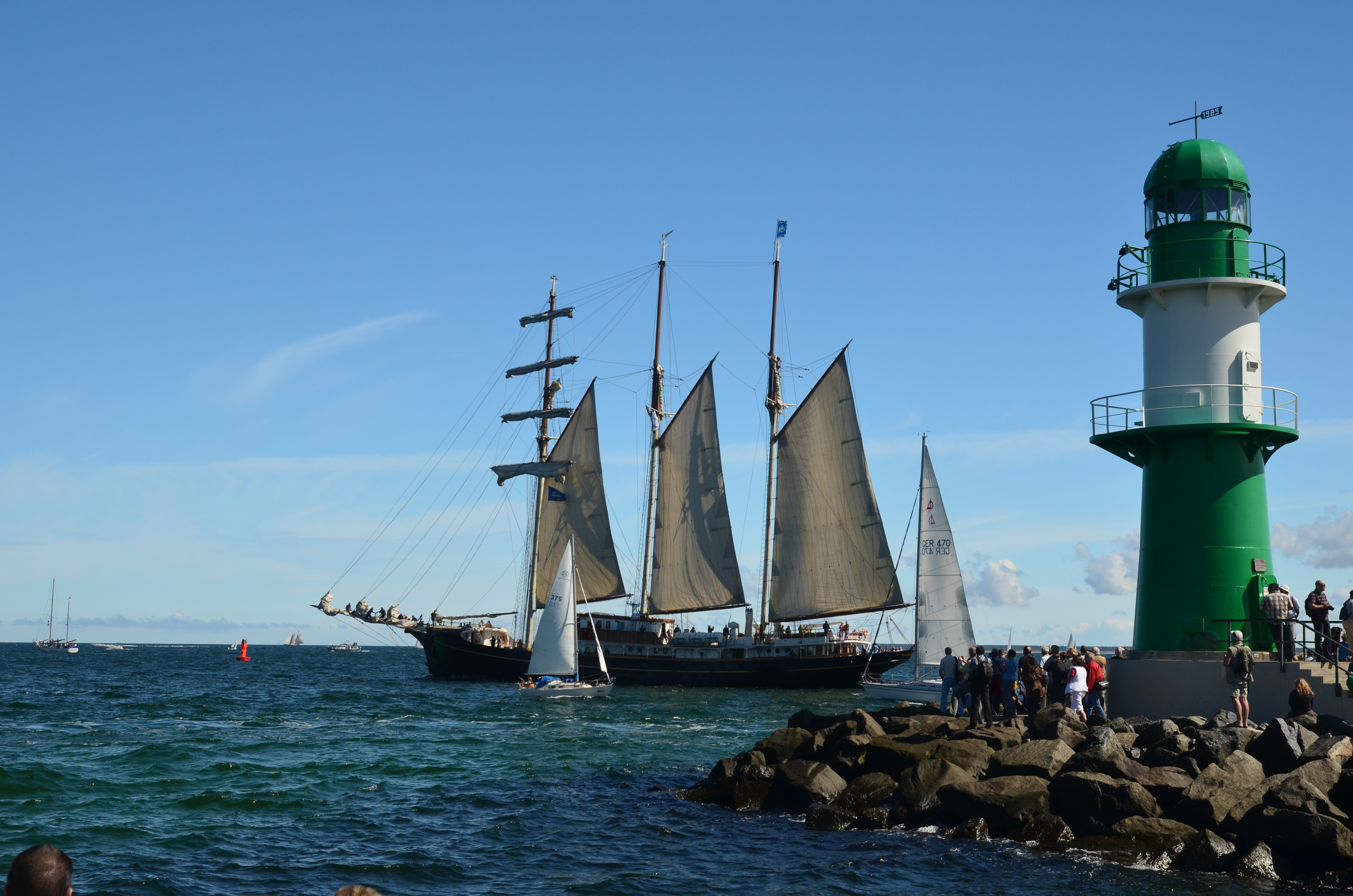
Gulden Leeuw (1937)

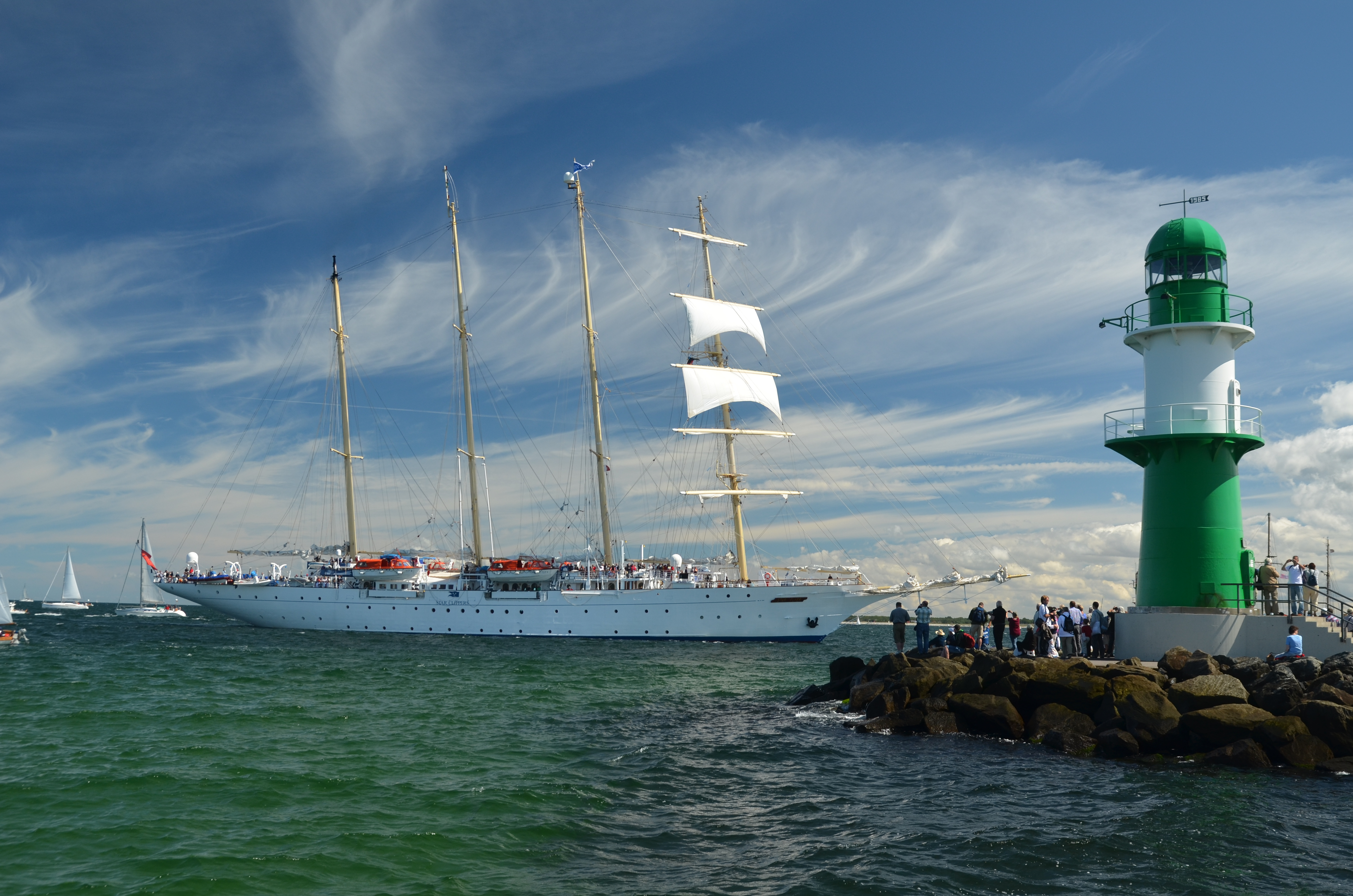
Star Flyer (1991)

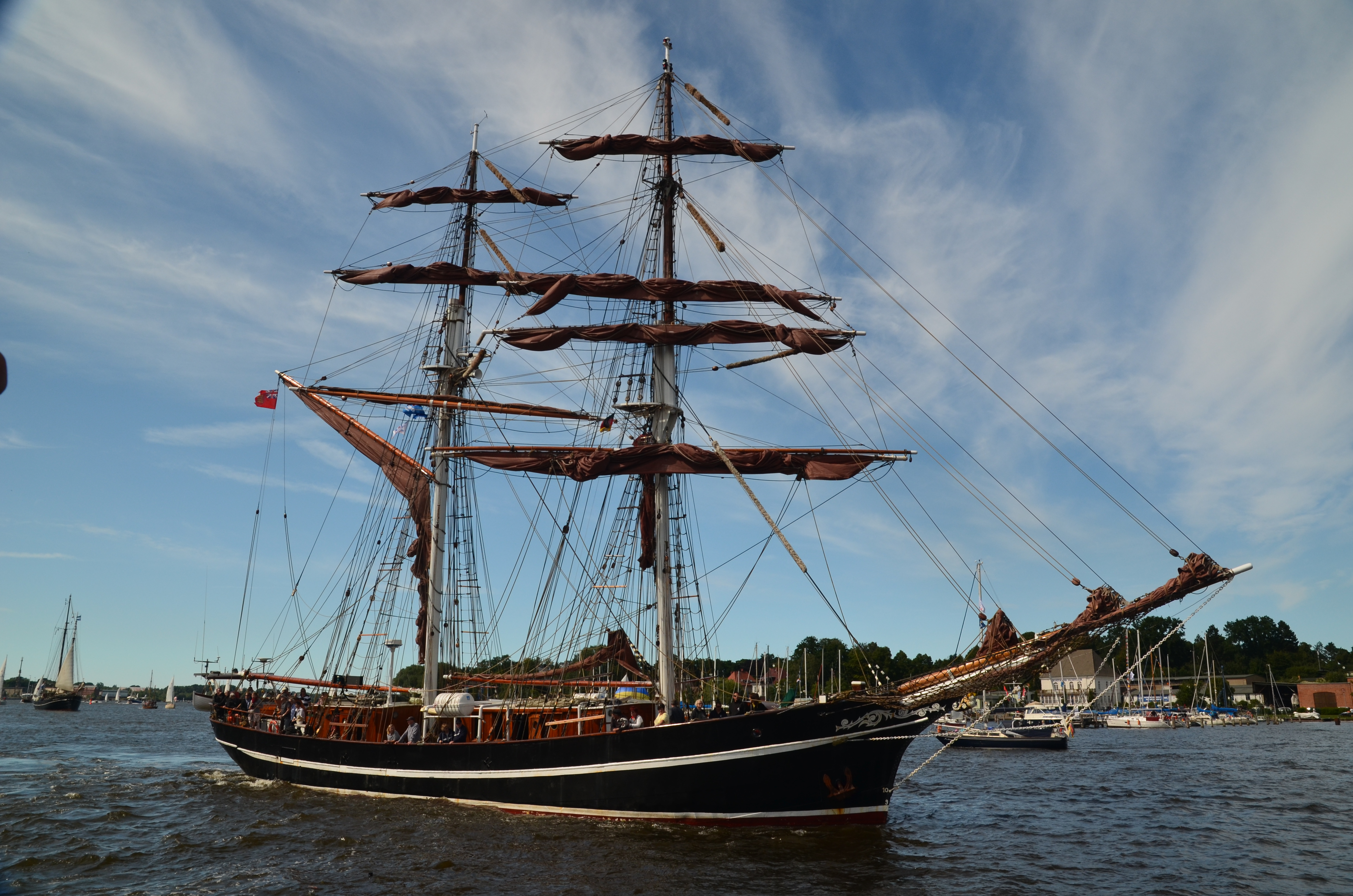
Eye of the Wind (1911)

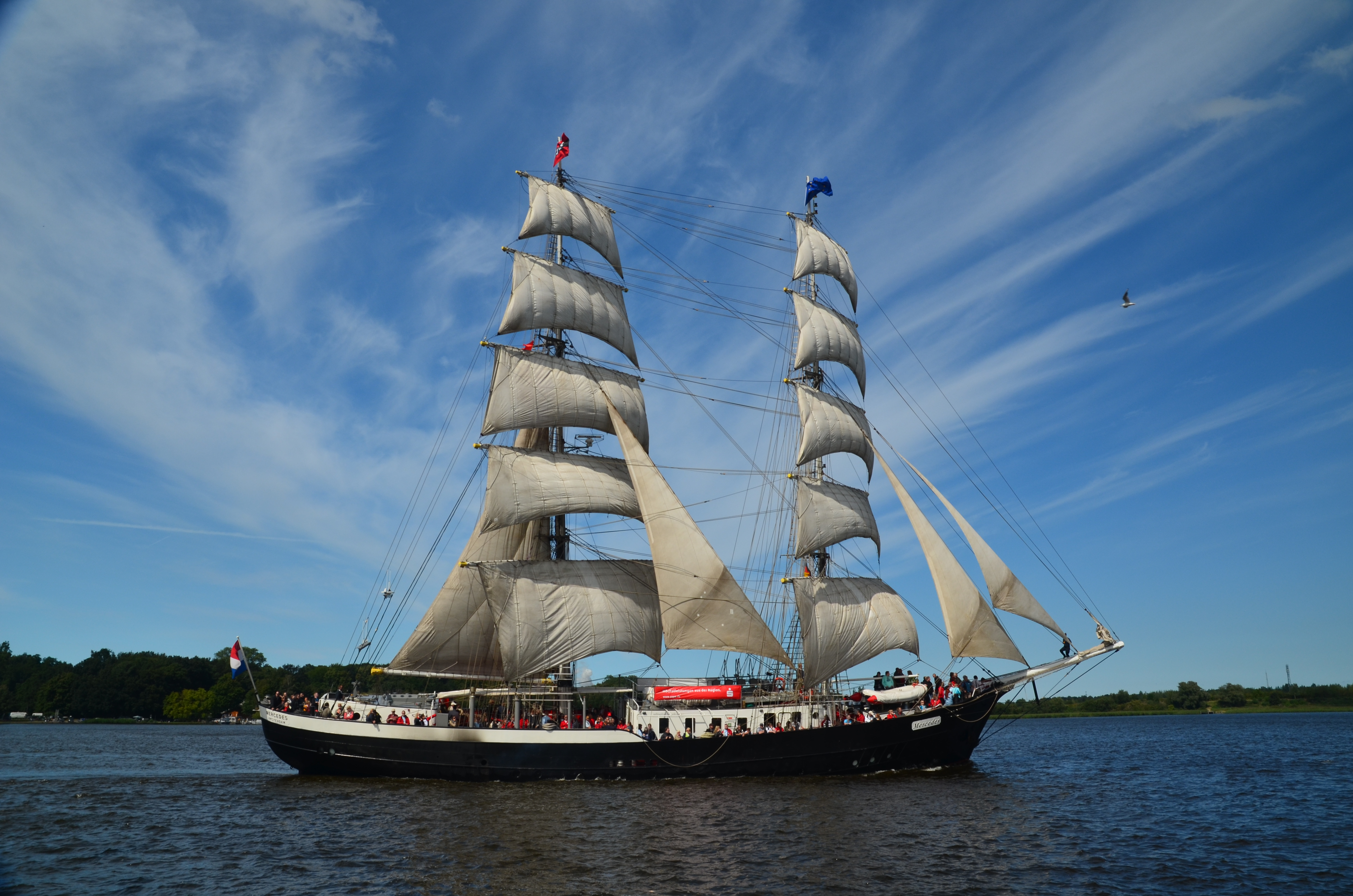
Mercedes (1958)

== See also ==
- Kiel Week (Kieler Woche)
- SAIL Amsterdam
