= Anne-Marie Barat =

French classical organist (1948–1990)

- Born: 20 June 1948; Fontainebleau, France
- Died: 21 December 1990 (aged 42)
- Education: Conservatoire de Paris
- Occupation: Classical organist

Anne-Marie Barat (20 June 1948 – 21 December 1990) was a French classical organist.

== Biography ==
Born in Fontainebleau, Barat attended the Conservatoire de Paris where she studied with Henri Challan, Norbert Dufourcq, Pierre Revel, Georges Dandelot, Alain Weber, Marcel Bitsch and Elsa Barraine. In 1970, she joined the organ class of Rolande Falcinelli, which she graduated with distinction. Winner of the writing and erudition classes, she also obtained a first organ prize unanimously in 1976. She has been studying the organ since 1970 with André Marchal. Also a pianist, she was a pupil of Vlado Perlemuter and Marcel Ciampi.

Organist of the église Saint-Louis de Fontainebleau from 1974, she jointly was appointed titular of the great organ of the Saint-Gervais-et-Saint-Protais de Soissons Cathedral in 1988.

She taught at the Conservatories of Fontainebleau and Marly-le-Roi. Her students included Éric Lebrun and Emmanuel Le Divellec. Since 1987 she had been professor at the Fontainebleau Schools. She performed at numerous concerts at home and abroad.

Barat died in a traffic accident on 21 December 1990.
