= Hanne Marie =

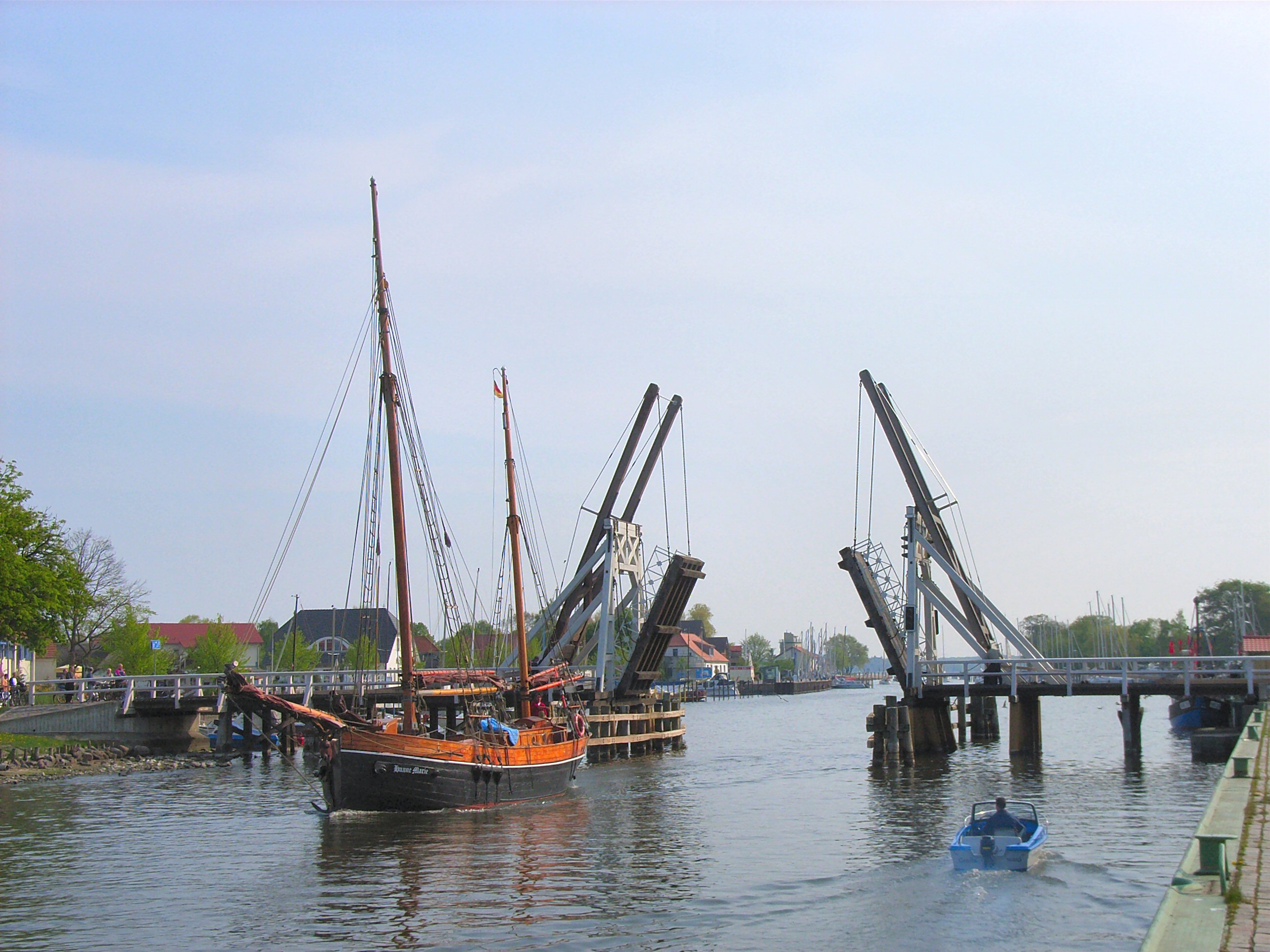
Hanne Marie on the Ryck.

Hanne Marie is a traditional sailing vessel with a gaff ketch rig that was built in Fanø Denmark in 1919. The ship originally functioned as a fishing vessel, but was decommissioned in Esbjerg in the 1970s. After being renovated between 1980 and 1990 Hanne Marie was transferred to Bielefeld, Germany and an association was created to maintain and sail the boat. Since 2004 the home port of Hanne Marie is Greifswald, Germany. There it is managed as a traditional ship by a small sailing collective called 'Hanne Marie Segeln e.V.'. Sailing trips start from the museum port in Greifswald and the excursions generally take place in the southern and western Baltic Sea. The goal of the collective is to preserve the art of traditional sailing.

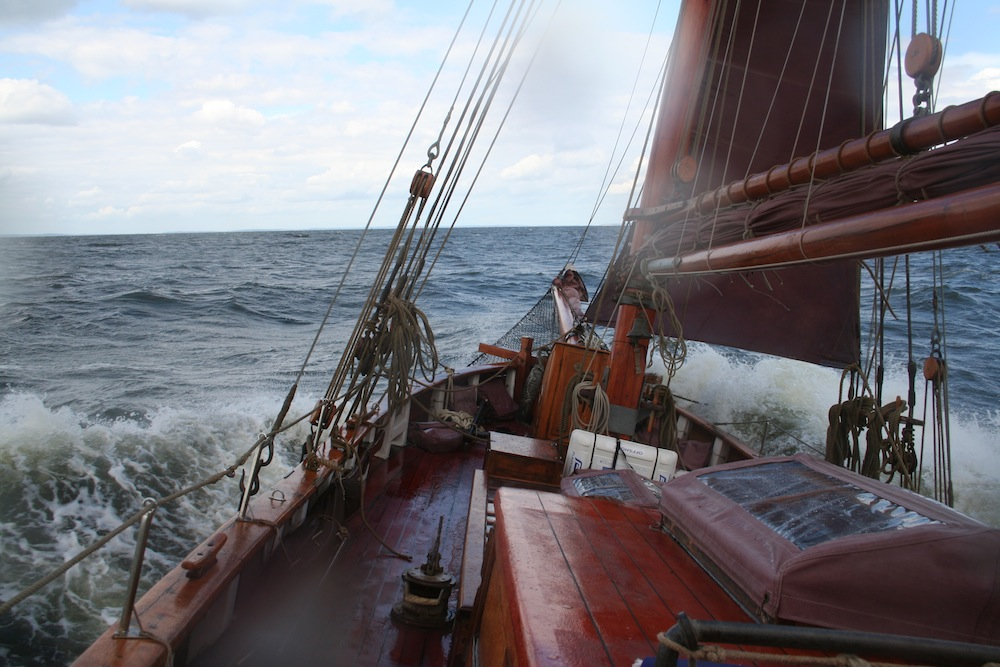
Hanne Marie on the Baltic Sea.

== Ship facts ==
Type of Ship	shark
Rig	Gaff-ketch with jib, foresail, mainsail and mizzen sail
Hull	wood
Total Length	65 ft
Width	13 ft
Draft	7 ft
Sail Area	460 sq m
Height Main Mast	56 ft over keel
Engine	55 kW Perkins
Berths	10

== See also ==
- Greif (also based from Greifswald)
