= Olivier Greif =

French composer

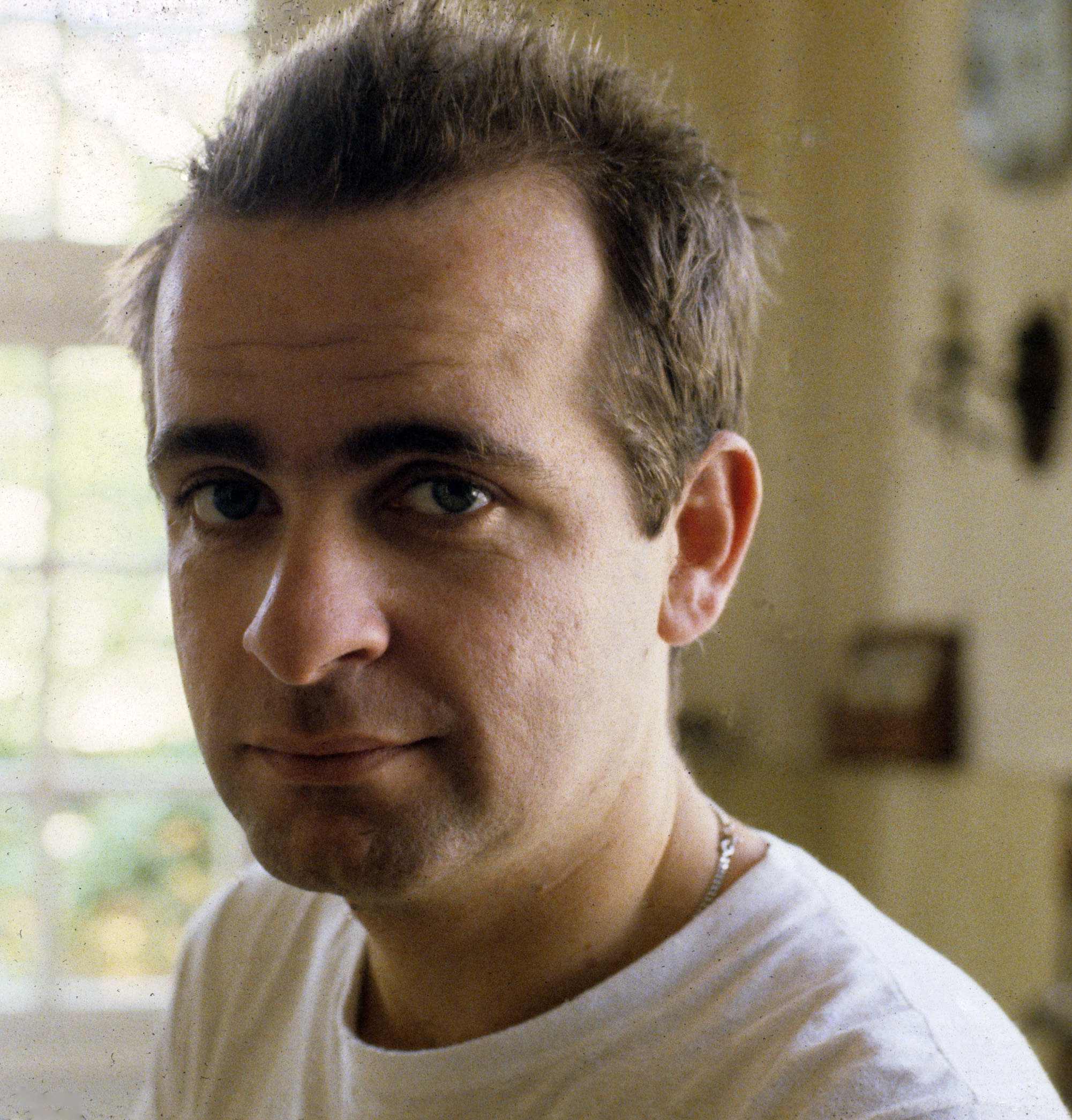

Olivier Greif, born in Paris on January 3, 1950 and died in Paris on May 13, 2000, was a French composer.

== Childhood and education ==
Raised in a supportive environment (a neuropsychiatrist and pianist father, brothers who were graduates of École Polytechnique), Olivier Greif was deeply marked by the history of his parents, Polish Jews who had settled in France and were victims of Nazi persecution. The blue number on the arm of his father, a survivor of the Auschwitz camp, would later appear in his sonata Le Rêve du monde (The Dream of the World).

A child prodigy, he began studying piano at the age of three and performed his first composition, Nausicaa (now lost), at a student recital of his piano teacher Lucette Descaves when he was nine years old. One year later, he entered the Paris Conservatory (now Conservatoire national supérieur de musique de Paris, CNSM), where he received various medals before entering, at the age of fifteen, Tony Aubin's composition class — bypassing the harmony, counterpoint, and fugue prizes.

He received a Second Prize in piano in 1966 and a First Prize in composition and chamber music in 1967. After a third-cycle chamber music class with Jean Hubeau, Olivier Greif left for the United States in 1969, entering the Juilliard School in New York to study composition with Luciano Berio and becoming his assistant the following year. He returned to the Paris Conservatory in 1972 to study conducting with Robert Blot, receiving a conducting certificate in 1974 and, a few years later, a diploma in instrumentation and orchestration from the newly created class of Marius Constant.

== Career ==
During these years he performed both as pianist and composer in several European countries as well as in the United States and Japan, and began teaching, notably at the Académie-Festival des Arcs founded by Roger Godino and directed by Yves Petit de Voize. He continued this threefold activity until 1982, gaining increasing recognition and numerous commissions (Radio Suisse Romande, Paris National Opera, IRCAM, CNSM). The first performers to premiere his works were Henri Barda, Nell Froger, and Gaëtane Prouvost. In 1976 he met Dom Jean Claire, beginning a correspondence with the choirmaster of the Benedictine Abbey of Solesmes that would continue until his death. His encounter in 1976 with the Indian spiritual master Sri Chinmoy shaped the following years.

Having adopted in 1978 the name Haridas Greif ("Haridas": servant of God in Sanskrit), he withdrew from the official musical world from 1982 to 1992, dedicating this period to serving his master and forming an amateur choir, the Sri Chinmoy Song-Waves Choir, with which he traveled widely. He nonetheless maintained some pedagogical, chamber music, and performance activities, giving concerts with pianists Henri Barda, Michel Dalberto, Jean-François Heisser, Georges Pludermacher, Bruno Rigutto; violinists Augustin Dumay, Raphaël Oleg, Régis Pasquier, Gérard Poulet, Gottfried Schneider; and cellists Frédéric Lodéon, Roland Pidoux, and Christoph Henkel.

From 1991–92 onward, he returned to composition. Among the performers of this period were violinist Renaud Capuçon, pianist Jérôme Ducros, cellists Henri Demarquette and Jérôme Pernoo, singers Jennifer Smith, Doris Lamprecht, Stephan Genz, the Sibelius, Danel, Vogler, and Sine Nomine Quartets, and conductor Jérémie Rohrer. Slowed in 1994 by colon cancer and in 1996 by acute pancreatitis, he became acutely aware of the urgency of reflecting on the act of composing and of completing his essential work, multiplying new creations. From 1997 to 1999, he was artist-in-residence at the Abbey of La Prée at the invitation of cellist Dominique de Williencourt and composer Nicolas Bacri. Having gradually distanced himself from his spiritual commitments, he definitively renounced them in 1998, and it was under his birth name, Olivier, that he died on May 13, 2000 at the age of fifty.

He was the younger brother of journalist and writer Jean-Jacques Greif, who recounts their childhood in his biographical novel Sans accent (Paris, 2001). He is buried in Montparnasse Cemetery (17th division).

== Works ==
Marked first by his Polish-Jewish roots and later by Indian spirituality, Olivier Greif composed works strongly connected to the Shoah (Holocaust) and the theme of war. His catalogue contains 361 opus numbers from 1961 until his death. He wrote many vocal works, mainly on English and German poetry (notably Heine, Hölderlin, and Paul Celan), but as an exceptional pianist he also wrote extensively for his instrument, including twenty-three sonatas. He composed many chamber works, including four string quartets, a piano trio, three violin-piano sonatas, and several cello pieces. His choral output includes around a dozen pieces, with instruments or a cappella (Requiem). His symphonic works are rarer: a cello concerto, a quadruple concerto, and a symphony. It is difficult to reduce Greif's music to a single aspect: it may be tonal, atonal, or modal, and draws on many languages, past and contemporary. The aesthetic category of expressionism seems the most accurate, as Emmanuel Reibel suggests, "through its intensity, its piercing cries, its lightning flashes, its desperate energy, its will to seize the listener, to 'drag him to the ground'". The term postmodernity has also been proposed, due to his rejection of modernist "narratives" (progress, complexity, primacy of language problems) and his systematic use of quotation, ranging from folk songs to hymns or jazz, along with frequent self-quotation. In this regard, Luciano Berio's influence was decisive: Greif met him shortly after Berio composed Sinfonia, a work built from dozens of quotations from various sources, including Gustav Mahler. Finally, the influence of American minimalist composers — especially Steve Reich — is notable and acknowledged by Greif himself: "This Finale, with its motoric character and its system of additive notes and amplification, betrays the influence, on the young composer I was after two years in the United States, of American repetitive music, particularly that of Steve Reich." Among the composers he most admired were Beethoven, Berlioz, the German Romantics, Mahler, as well as Britten and Shostakovich — the two composers he cited most often and to whom he paid homage (see op. 31 and op. 70 below). Among his contemporaries, he was close to Olivier Messiaen, Henri Dutilleux, his teacher Luciano Berio, and his friend Philippe Hersant.

Main Works (for a full catalogue, see oliviergreif.com/catalogue)

Piano

• In memoriam [Gustav Mahler], op. 31, 1969

• Rondo 42nd Street, op. 33a, 1970

• Sonata “Dans le style ancien” op. 48, 1967/1974 (dedicated to Arthur Rubinstein)

• Sonata in Three Movements “De guerre,” op. 54, 1965/1975

• Le Tombeau de Ravel, op. 56, four-hands piano, 1975

• Sonata “Trois pieces sérieuses”, op. 289, 1993

• Sonata "Le Rêve du Monde", op. 290, 1993

• Am Grabe Franz Liszts, op. 295, 1993 (dedicated to Brigitte François-Sappey)

• Sonata "Codex Domini", op. 303, 1994

• Sonata "Les Plaisirs de Chérence", op. 319, 1997 (dedicated to Brigitte François-Sappey)

• Portraits et apparitions, op. 359, 1998–1999

Two instruments

• Sonata No. 2 for piano and violin, op. 17, 1967

• Sonata No. 3 “The Meeting of the Waters” for piano and violin, op. 70, 1976 (In memoriam Dmitri Shostakovich)

• Variations on Peter Philips’ “Galiarda dolorosa” for violin and piano, op. 86, 1977

• Veni Creator for cello and piano, op. 103, 1977 (dedicated to Father Jean Claire)

• Oi akashe, Hymn for cello and piano, op. 170, 1983 (dedicated to Mukunda Hirschi)

• Sonate de Requiem, for cello and piano, op. 283, 1979/1992 (dedicated to his mother, Frédéric Lodéon, and Christoph Henkel)

• Sonata “The Battle of Agincourt” for two cellos, op. 308, 1995–1996 (dedicated to Marcel Landowski)

Three instruments

• Trio for piano, violin, and cello, op. 353, 1998

Four instruments

• String Quartet No. 2 with voice, op. 314, 1996 (dedicated to Etienne Yver)

• String Quartet No. 3 “Todesfuge,” with baritone voice, op. 351, 1998 (dedicated to Jean-Michel Nectoux)

• String Quartet No. 4 “Ulysses,” op. 360, 2000 (dedicated to Marylis and François-Raoul Duval and their dachshund Ulysse)

Five instruments

• Quintet “A Tale of the World,” for piano and strings, op. 307, 1994 (dedicated to Seppo Kimanen)

Six instruments

• Ich ruf zu dir for piano, clarinet, and string quartet, op. 356, 1999 (in memory of his father)

Orchestral Music

• Symphony No. 1 for baritone voice and orchestra, op. 327, 1997, on five poems by Paul Celan (in German)

• Quadruple Concerto “La Danse des morts” for piano, violin, viola, cello, and orchestra, op. 352, 1998 (dedicated to Yves Petit de Voize)

• Concerto Durch Adams Fall for cello and orchestra, op. 357, 1999

Songs for solo voice and piano, unless otherwise specified

• Wiener Konzert, op. 40, 1973. Five Lieder on poems by Heinrich Heine (in German)

• Light Music, op. 49, 1974. Seven Lieder for female voice, male voice, and piano, on poems by Heinrich Heine (in German)

• Four Songs for female voice and piano, op. 63, 1976

• Three Poems of Sri Chinmoy, op. 87, 1977 (in English, dedicated to Jessye Norman)

• Wie Vögel…, Nine Lieder on poems by Hölderlin, op. 270–271, 1991–1992

• Deux Mélodies, op. 297–298, 1994

• Chants de l’âme, op. 310, 1979/1995. Nine songs after the English “metaphysical” poets (“In memoriam Benjamin Britten / For Brigitte François-Sappey”)

• The Book of Irish Saints/Le Livre des Saints irlandais, op. 323, 1997. Five poems by John Irvine (in English)

• Imago mundi, op. 347, 1998. Songs on poems by Dylan Thomas, William Blake, Paul Celan, Walt Whitman, Sylvia Plath, Samuel Lazerovsky (dedicated to Stephan Genz)

• Trois Chansons apocryphes, op. 350, 1998. Traditional French poems (dedicated to Marie Devellereau)

• Three Settings of Musset, op. 361, 2000 (dedicated to Guillaume de Chalambert) Cantatas (and Works for Voice and Chamber Ensemble)

• Bomben auf Engelland, op. 43 and op. 71, 1976. Concert aria for female voice, alto saxophone (2nd version), and piano on a German military text by Wilhelm Stöppler (dedicated to those of his people murdered during the last war)

• Petite Cantate de chambre, op. 73, 1976. For female voice and two pianos, on Psalm 23 The Lord is my shepherd” (in English)

• Le Livre du pèlerin, op. 144, 1980. For female voice, flute, oboe, clarinet, bassoon, horn, violin, and piano on The Tyger by William Blake and excerpts from Old Testament psalms (in English, dedicated to Sri Chinmoy)

• Little Black Mass/Petite Messe noire, op. 142, 1980. For female voice, instrumental viola, and piano, on texts from American religious and folk songs (in English)

• Lettres de Westerbork, op. 291, 1993. For female voice and two violins on texts by Etty Hillesum and excerpts from Old Testament psalms; in English (sung) and French (spoken), dedicated to his father [Léon-Jacques Greif] and Gilles Cantagrel

• Hymnes spéculatifs, op. 312, 1996. For voice, clarinet, horn, cello, and piano on excerpts from the Vedas in Sri Aurobindo’s translation (in English, dedicated to Rémi Lerner)

• L’Office des naufragés, op. 354, 1998. For female voice, clarinet, piano, and string quartet on texts by Julian of Norwich, Juliana Berners, Lady Sarashina, Emily Dickinson, Rabi’a the Mystic, Anna Akhmatova, Virginia Woolf, and Paul Celan (in English and German, dedicated to Eduard Brunner)

Choral Music

• Hiroshima-Nagasaki, op. 169, 1983. For mixed choir a cappella

• Requiem, op. 358, 1999. For double mixed choir a cappella (in Latin and English, dedicated to John and Laura Poole)

Opera

• Nô, op. 158, 1981. Chamber opera in ten scenes, for soprano, tenor, baritone, and instrumental ensemble. Libretto in French by Marc Cholodenko and Olivier Greif (dedicated to Sri Chinmoy)

Awards

• 1977: Nicolo Prize for musical composition, awarded by the Académie des Beaux-Arts

• 1998: Chartier Prize for musical composition, awarded by the Académie des Beaux-Arts

Discography

• Sonate de Requiem, Christoph Henkel, violoncelle, Haridas [Olivier] Greif, piano, Agon/Disques Pierre Vérany, PV 720009 (1996)

• Chants de l’âme; Lettres de Westerbork. Jennifer Smith, soprano, Olivier Greif, piano; Doris Lamprecht, mezzo-soprano, Alexis Galpérine and Eric Crambes, violins. Triton: TRI 331101 (1999)

• Sonate de guerre, Pascal Amoyel, piano, Pianovox, Pia 526-2 (2000)

• Trois Chansons apocryphes, Marie Devellereau, soprano, Olivier Greif, piano. Triton: TRI 331119 (2001)

• Hommage à Olivier Greif. Sonate de Requiem, Christoph Henkel, cello, Olivier Greif, piano. Le Tombeau de Ravel, Henri Barda & Olivier Greif, piano four-hands. String Quartet No. 3 “Todesfuge”, with voice, Quatuor Sine Nomine, Stephan Genz, baritone. Triton (2001).

• Sonate de Requiem, op. 283 for cello and piano (1979–1993); Trio (1998) — Antje Weithaas, violin; Emmanuelle Bertrand, cello; Pascal Amoyel, piano, Harmonia Mundi HMG 501900 (2005)

• Requiem for double choir a cappella, BBC Singers, conducted by John Poole. Triton: TRI 331150 (2005)

• L’Office des naufragés. Ensemble Accroche Note with Françoise Kübler, voice; Armand Angster, clarinet; Alexandre Gasparov, piano; Stéphanie-Marie Degand and Nathanaëlle Marie, violins; Pierre Franck, viola; Christophe Beau, cello. Triton 331142 (2006)

• Sonata No. 2 for Violin and Piano, Geneviève Laurenceau, violin, Lorène de Ratuld, piano; Piano Sonata No. 21 “Codex Domini”, Jong Hwa Park, piano (first world recording); Wiener Konzert, Hjördis Thébault, soprano, Charles Bouisset, piano; Le Tombeau de Ravel, Jong Hwa Park and Henri Barda, piano, Saphir Productions (2007)

• Sonata for two cellos “The Battle of Agincourt”; String Quartet No. 2 with voice on Shakespeare sonnets. Patrick Langot and Agnès Vestermann, cellos; Quatuor Syntonia, Alain Buet, baritone. Zig-Zag Territoires ZZT100401, Harmonia Mundi, (2009)

• The Meeting of the Waters. Complete works for violin and piano. Stéphanie Moraly, violin; Romain David, piano, Triton TRI331165 (2010)

• Le Rêve du monde : Olivier Greif joue Olivier Greif (double album) : Suite pour piano (recorded 1962); Sonate de guerre (rec. 1978); Le Rêve du monde for piano (rec. 1993); Sonate for piano and violon n° 2 (rec. 1968); Sonate n° 3 « The Meeting of the Waters », piano and violin (rec. 1993); Wiener Konzert for voice and piano (rec. 1974); Bomben auf Engelland for voice, saxophone and piano (rec. 1976); Petite Cantate de chambre for voice et two pianos (rec. 1977); Hommage à Paul Bowles, voice and piano (rec. 1994); Les Trottoirs de Paris, soprano, tenor and piano (rec. 1997), Olivier Greif, with Henri Barda, piano, Devy Erlih, Gottfried Schneider, violin, Ryo Noda, saxophone, Nell Froger, Evelyn Brunner, Catherine Dubosc, Jean-Paul Fouchécourt, Jo-Ann Pickens, Howard Haskin, INA, Mémoire vive, IMV084 (2010) Diapason d’or of the year 2010, “archives” category

• Cello Concerto Durch Adams Fall; Sonate de Requiem, Henri Demarquette, cello, Giovanni Bellucci, piano, Orchestre national de France conducted by Jean-Claude Casadesus. Accord 100401, Universal (2010). Choc de l’année 2010 for Classica

• Les Plaisirs de Chérence, Portraits and Apparitions. Olivier Greif, piano. Triton: TRI 331195 (2014)

• Chants de l’âme, op. 310; Les Trottoirs de Paris. Marie-Laure Garnier, Clémentine Decouture, sopranos; Paco Garcia, tenor; Yan Levionnois, cello; Philippe Hattat, piano. B Records LBM024 (2020). Choc de l’année 2020 for Classica

• Quintet A Tale of the World for piano and strings, Quintette Syntonia, Ciar Classics, (first world recording) (2020)

• Sonata No. 18 “Three Poems of Li T’ai Po” (first world recording), Sonata No. 21 “Codex Domini”, Aline Piboule, piano. Coincidentia oppositorum, 3770004972906; ATLA044, Artalinna, (2024).

Bibliography

• Under the direction of Brigitte François-Sappey and Jean-Michel Nectoux, Olivier Greif: Le Rêve du monde : essais, témoignages et documents, Aedam Musicae, 2013 (ISBN 9782919046157), Prix des Muses, Singer-Polignac, 2014; Critics’ Syndicate Prize, 2014.

• Anne Bramard-Blagny and Marie-Claude Pascal, We are the Words: Olivier Greif, compositeur : entretiens avec ses amis, Delatour France, 2013 (ISBN 9782752101648)

• Journal, edited by Jean-Jacques Greif, Aedam Musicae, 2019 (ISBN 9782919046553)

• Under the direction of Brigitte François-Sappey and Étienne Kippelein, Olivier Greif d’éclat et de douleur, Euterpe, January 2023. Preface by Gérard Condé, texts by Brigitte François-Sappey, François-Gildas Tual, Étienne Kippelen, Sarah Léon, Félix Benati, Brice Tissier, Anne Ibos-Augé, Anne-Élise Thouvenin, Thomas Vernet, Jean-Jacques Greif, Patricia Aubertin.

• Olivier Greif, Dom Jean Claire, le Moine et le compositeur, une rencontre improbable. Correspondance, 9 avril 1976 - 5 mai 2000. Edited by Patrick Hala. Preface by Alexis Galpérine. Éditions de Solesmes, 2025. ISBN 978-2-85274-376-2.

• Sarah Léon, “Olivier Greif et le postmodernisme,” Euterpe, 2023. Sarah Léon. Olivier Greif et le postmodernisme. Euterpe, 2023 p. 35-42. https://hal.science/hal-04916779v1

• Emmanuel Reibel, “Parcours de l’œuvre d’Olivier Greif”, IRCAM-Centre Pompidou, 2016 (read online). English : Survey of works by Olivier Greif, https://ressources.ircam.fr/en/composer/olivier-greif/workcourse

Filmography

• Les Incontournables d'Olivier Greif, Anne Bramard-Blagny and Julia Blagny, 12 DVDs (Diapason d’or, Clef du mois ResMusica, Coup de cœur Charles Cros, 4 stars Forumopera and 3 stars Classica),

External Links • On other Wikimedia projects: Olivier Greif, on Wikiquote

• Resources related to music: AllMusic, BRAHMS, Carnegie Hall, Discogs, MusicBrainz, Muziekweb, Rate Your Music

• Resource related to performance: Les Archives du spectacle

• Resource related to multiple fields: Radio France

• Entry in a general dictionary or encyclopedia: Universalis (archive)

• Authority records: VIAF, ISNI, BnF (data), IdRef, LCCN, GND, Spain, Netherlands, Poland, Israel, Czech Republic

• Website of the Olivier Greif Association. http://www.oliviergreif.com/ (archive)

• "Portal of Contemporary Music" ... excerpts of sound archives of Olivier Greif

• “Olivier Greif,” Musiques s’en mêlent, Lylradio, 27.11.25. https://lyl.live/show/musiques-sen-melent/ (archive)

• IRCAM resources on Olivier Greif. https://ressources.ircam.fr/en/composer/olivier-greif/resources
