= Greiff =

Greif may refer to:

People

- Boris de Greiff Bernal - (1930-2011), Colombian chess master and writer
- León de Greiff Haeusler - (1895–1976), Colombian poet
- Mónica de Greiff Lindo - (born 1956), Colombian lawyer, politician
- Gustavo de Greiff Restrepo - (born 1929), Colombian lawyer, ambassador

== See also ==
- Greif (disambiguation)
