= SMS Greif =

Several ships of the German and Austro-Hungarian Navies have been named SMS Greif

- SMS Greif (1866), an Austro-Hungarian aviso originally launched in 1857 as the merchant paddle steamer Jupiter
- SMS Greif (1886), a German aviso launched in 1886
- SMS Greif (1907), an Austro-Hungarian Kaiman-class torpedo boat launched in 1907
- SMS Greif (1914), a German auxiliary cruiser during World War I
