= Greif (brigantine) =

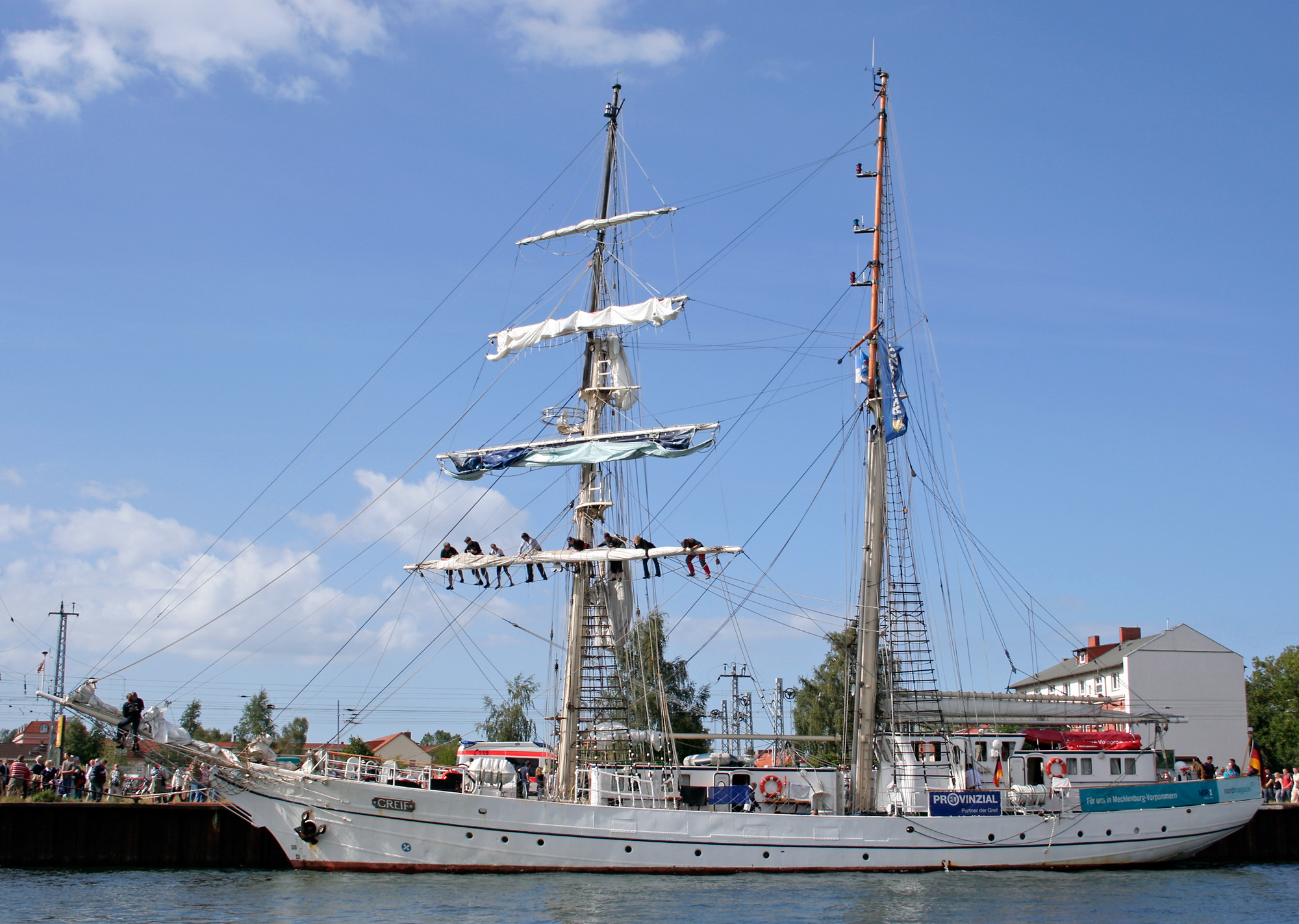
- Greif at "Hanse Sail 2008"

Germany
- Name: Wilhelm Pieck
- Owner: Greifswald, Germany
- Acquired: 1951
- Commissioned: 2 August 1951
- Renamed: Greif
- Identification: IMO number: 8862571
- Status: Training ship
- Notes: Call sign, DQFD

General characteristics
- Class & type: Brigantine; 100 A5 Sailing ship, German Lloyd
- Tonnage: 179,2 tons; 280 tons displacement
- Length: 41.10 m (134.8 ft) LOA
- Beam: 7.40 m (24.3 ft)
- Draft: max. 3,60 m
- Propulsion: MTU Marine Diesel, 8 cylinders, 233 HP
- Sail plan: 15 sails, 570 m² sail area, 14 kn (26 km/h) max. speed under sail
- Complement: Max. 50 crew

Greif is a brigantine, owned by the town Greifswald in Mecklenburg-Vorpommern.

It was built in 1951 at Warnowwerft, Warnemünde/Rostock with a steel hull, launched May 26, 1951 and commissioned August 2, 1951. It was the first steel vessel built after World War II at the port, and was christened Wilhelm Pieck after the first president of the German Democratic Republic. In 1990 it participated in the first German sail event. The ship was later given to the town of Greifswald and overhauled in Rostock, and re-christened Greif.

The ship is used as a training ship for maritime youth education. It has participated in the Hanse Sail, including Hanse Sail Rostock 2011.

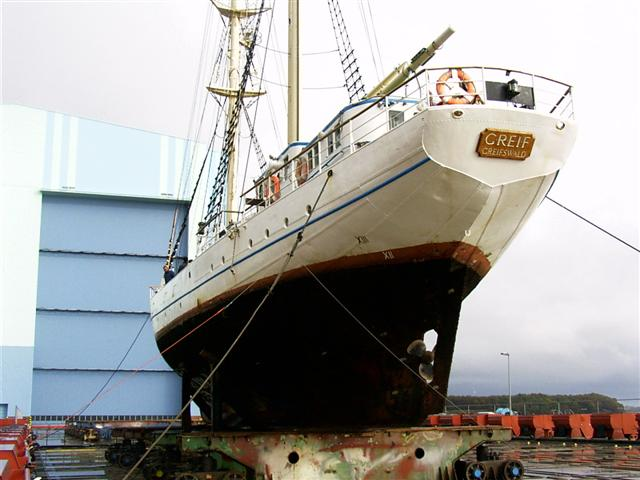
Grief out of the water

== See also ==
- Hanne Marie (also based from Greifswald)
