= Jean-Jacques Greif =

French journalist and writer (born 1944)

Jean-Jacques Greif (born in Paris in 1944) is a French journalist and writer. He has written for the magazine Marie Claire for thirty years.

== Biography ==
Greif was born in Paris in 1944, while his father, Lonek (later Lėon-Jacques), was being held in Auschwitz, having been arrested soon after Greif was conceived. Lonek survived the concentration camp, and told his son stories of his time there, which inspired some of Greif's novels. He is the oldest brother of composer–pianist Olivier Greif (1950-2000) and the editor of his brother's journal published in 2019.

Initially employed as an engineer, he went on to become a copywriter for an advertising company. He and his wife founded a school, and for a time he taught French and Physics In 1975, he started working as a journalist for Marie Claire magazine and carried on until 2011. His first book for teenagers was published in 1996, and he has gone on to write 16.
