= Alexandre Boëly =

French organist and composer (1785–1858)

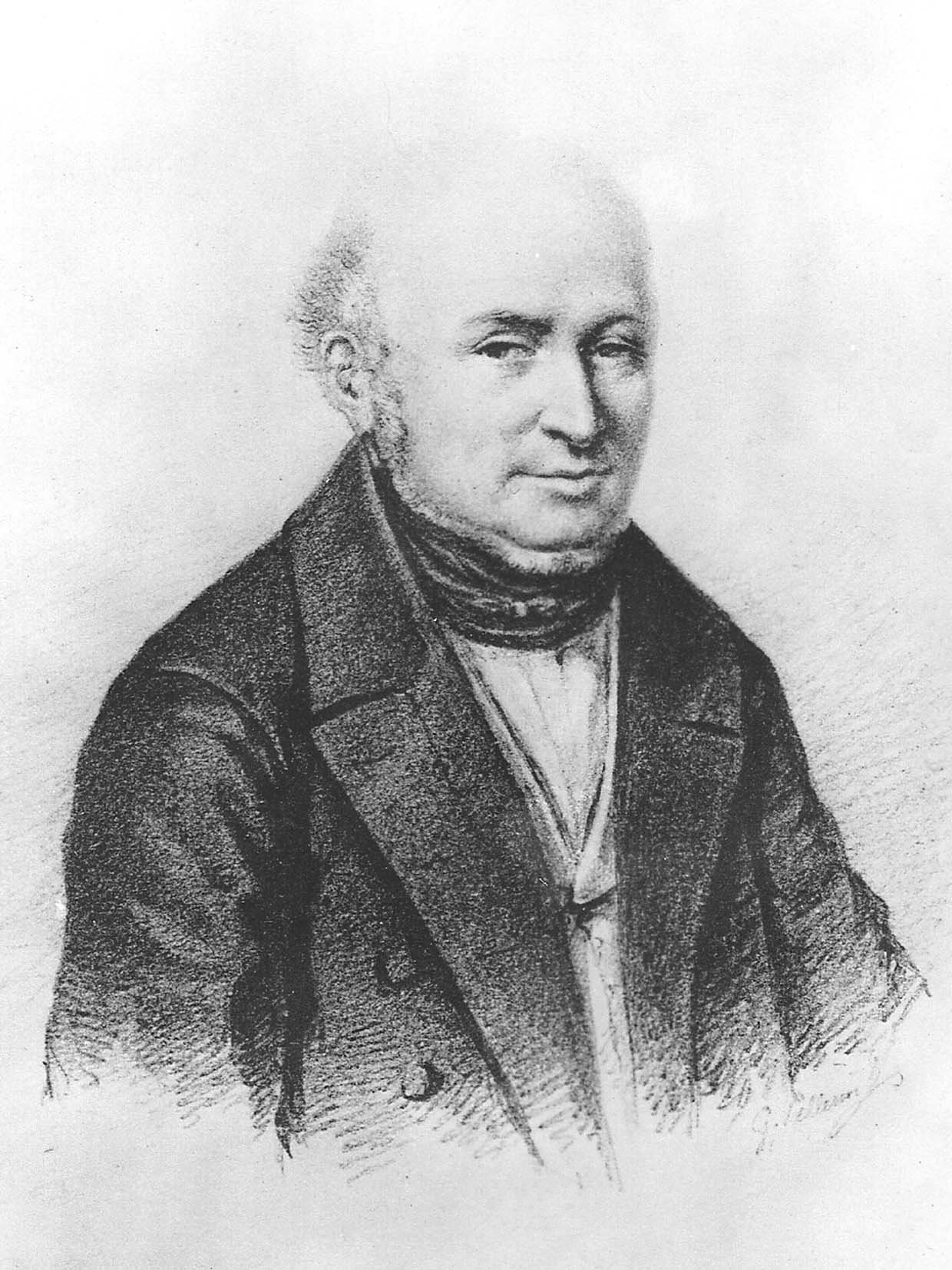
Boëly (c. 1820) in a pastel by Edmond Pellerin; from the Musée Lambinet (Versailles)

Alexandre Pierre-François Boëly (19 April 1785 – 27 December 1858) was a French composer, organist, pianist, and violist.

== Career ==
Born in Versailles into a family of musicians, Boëly received his first music lessons from his father, Jean-François, who was a countertenor at the Sainte-Chapelle in Paris and a composer and harp teacher at the court of Versailles. He also studied under the Tyrolian pianist Ignaz Ladurner, who introduced him to the work of Bach and Haydn, which Boëly would champion in his adult career. Besides mastering the piano and organ, Boëly was also a talented violist.

As the Romantic movement swept through Europe during the 19th century, Boëly was shunned by the official mainstream of musical life in Paris because of his classical sensibilities and his "elitist" fidelity to writing serious music. Boëly regarded with distaste the music that was written and feted by many of his contemporaries. The most popular standards during the Napoleonic period were compositions that swelled with patriotism or operatic intensity. Entrenching his reactionary reputation, he used his appointment as organist at Saint Germain l'Auxerrois in 1840 to promote the works of deceased composers who were then only scantily appreciated by the public. These included Frescobaldi, Couperin and, most importantly of all, the supposedly impenetrable, unplayable Bach.

Such efforts did not win him popular favour, for he was dismissed from his position in 1851 for the "austerity" of his playing. He died a simple piano teacher, but not without enjoying the respect and confidence of a close circle of friends which included Marie Bigot, Pierre Baillot, Friedrich Kalkbrenner, and Johann Baptist Cramer.

Although Boëly was and remains largely unknown to the public, this does not diminish the part he played in the flourishing development of French music during the 19th century. He left behind an impressive oeuvre which numbers about 300 individual works, especially in the genres of chamber music and instrumental pieces for piano or organ. These include twelve books of practice-pieces of different styles and four books for organ with pedals or piano three hands. In old age, he was sought out by two rising young artists, César Franck and Camille Saint-Saëns, who revered him as a guardian of a noble and pure classical organ tradition.

He died of natural causes at 27 rue Ponthieu in Paris in 1858 at the age of 73. After a requiem mass at the church of Saint-Philippe-du-Roule in which his pupil Saint-Saëns played the organ, he was buried at the Montmartre Cemetery.

== Bibliography ==
- Brigitte François-Sappey: "Alexandre Pierre François Boëly", The New Grove Dictionary of Music and Musicians, ed. S. Sadie and J. Tyrrell (London: Macmillan, 2001)
- Craig Cramer: The Published Works of Alexandre Pierre François Boëly, dissertation for the Eastman School of Music.
