= Brigitte François-Sappey =

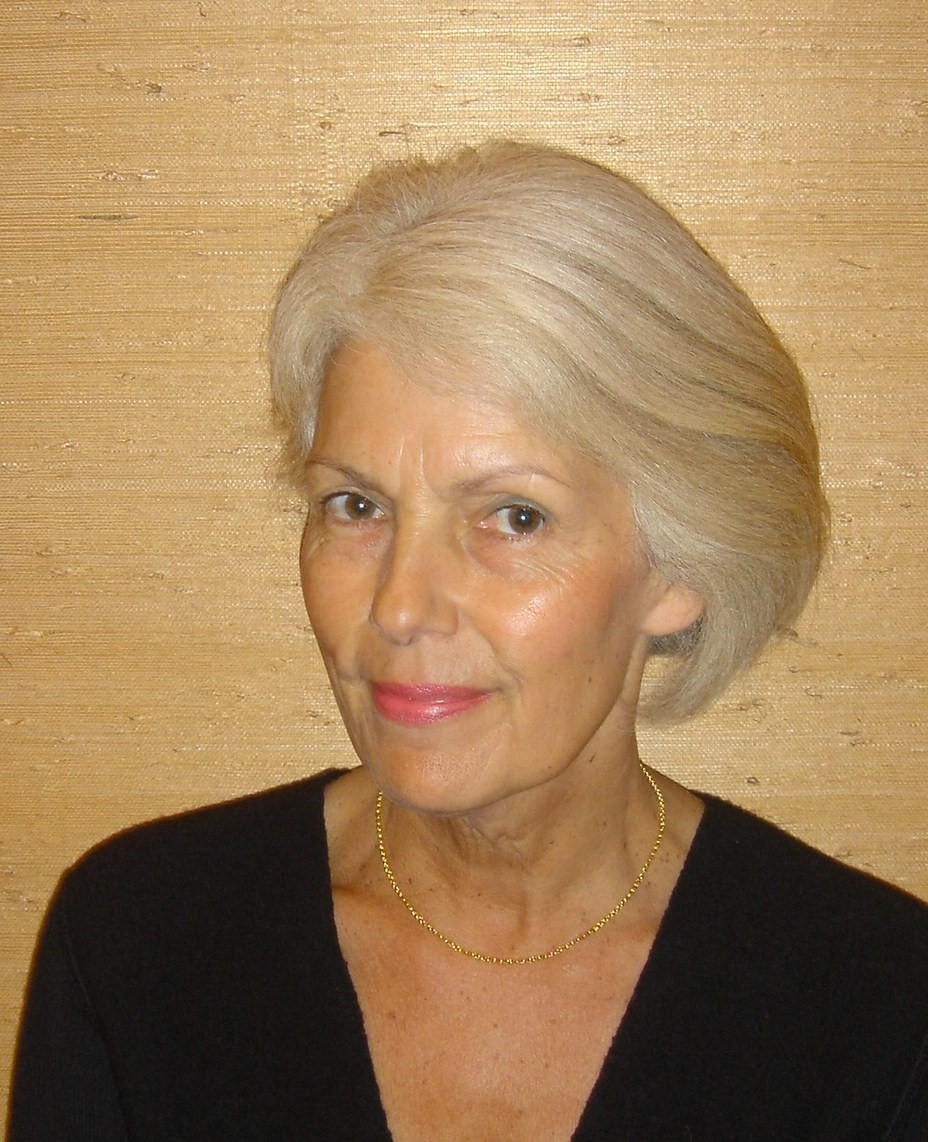
- Portrait of Brigitte François-Sappey
- Born: 21 January 1944 (age 81); Grenoble, France
- Education: Conservatoire de Lyon; Conservatoire de Paris; Paris-Sorbonne University
- Occupations: Musicologist; Radio producer; Music educator; Lecturer
- Awards: Officier of the Ordre des Arts et des Lettres; Chevalier of the Légion d'honneur

Brigitte François-Sappey (born 21 January 1944) is a French musicologist, educator, radio producer, and lecturer.

== Biography ==
Brigitte François-Sappey studied music at the Conservatoire de Paris where she won first prizes of music history, musical analysis, musical esthetics, musicology, and at the École normale de musique de Paris where she graduated for piano teaching.

At the same time, she pursued graduate studies in history at the Paris IV University. After obtaining a bachelor's and master's degrees, she is a Ph.D. student in humanities and social sciences, under the direction of Norbert Dufourcq.

A professor of music history at the Conservatoire de Paris from 1973, she created the class of music culture in 1992, of which she is now an honorary professor. She also founded the classes of art and civilization and history of music at the Conservatoire de Lyon (1979–1982) and musical analysis at the Conservatoire Rameau of the 6th arrondissement of Paris (1976–1979). She has been a visiting professor at the University of Lisbon (1978), the summer university of Versailles (1979–1982) and at the University of Paris III: Sorbonne Nouvelle (2003–2009).

She is a member of numerous juries in superior conservatories, the École normale supérieure and several universities, including Paris-Sorbonne.

A producer of concerts and programs at Radio France (1991–1997), she has since been invited at France Musique, France Culture, as well as Radio Suisse Romande.

She regularly participates in scientific conferences and gives numerous lectures in very different places (universities, La Folle Journée of Nantes etc.).

Brigitte François-Sappey is chevalier of the Légion d'honneur, and officier of the Ordre des Arts et Lettres.

== Publications ==
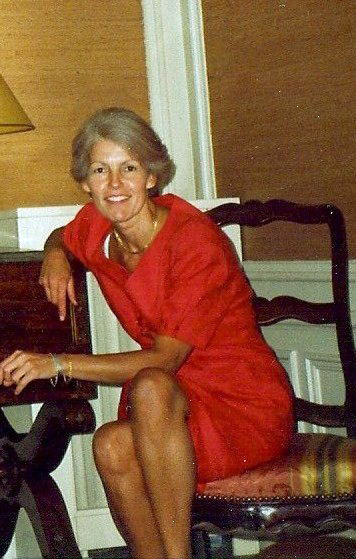
Brigitte François-Sappey.

In addition to numerous articles and contributions to collective works, her main works deal with French and German romanticism.

- Pierre Baillot (Picard, 1978),
- Jean-François Dandrieu (Picard, 1982) ISBN 2708400711,
- Alexandre Pierre François Boëly et son temps (Aux Amateurs de livres, 1989) ISBN 2905053585,
- Le Personnel de la Musique royale (1774–1792) (Picard, 1990, 1992),
- Guide de la musique d'orgue, in collaboration with Gilles Cantagrel (Fayard, 1991),
- Charles-Valentin Alkan, direction of the work (Fayard, 1991) ISBN 221302779X,
- Histoire de la musique en Europe (PUF, 1992), Translated into several languages
- Guide de la mélodie et du lied, dir. with Gilles Cantagrel (Fayard, 1994) ISBN 9782213592107,
- Robert Schumann (Fayard, 2000). (Grand Prix des Muses, Musicora) ISBN 221360603X, *Schumann
- Clara Schumann (Geneva, Éditions Papillon, 2002) ISBN 2940310092,
- Robert Schumann (Fayard/Mirare, 2003). Translated into Portuguese ISBN 2213617309,
- Felix Mendelssohn (Fayard/Mirare, 2003). Translated into Portuguese ISBN 2213617295,
- Alexandre Pierre François Boëly, with Éric Lebrun (Bleu Nuit Éditeur, 2008) ISBN 2913575927,
- Felix Mendelssohn, la lumière de son temps (Fayard, 2008). (Prix Catenacci de l’Académie des Beaux-Arts, Institut de France) ISBN 9782213637808,
- La Musique dans l’Allemagne romantique (Fayard, 2009) ISBN 9782213633312,
- De Brahms à Mahler et Strauss. Le postromantisme allemand (Fayard/Mirare, 2010) ISBN 9782213655925,
- Charles-Valentin Alkan, with François Luguenot (Bleu Nuit Éditeur, 2013) ISBN 9782358840231,
- La Musique en France depuis 1870 (Fayard/Mirare, 2013) ISBN 9782213671987,
- Olivier Greif Le Rêve du Monde (with a CD), dir. with Jean-Michel Nectoux (Aedam Musicae, 2013), (Prix des Muses de la Fondation Singer-Polignac 2014, Prix de la Critique 2013/2014) ISBN 9782919046157,
- La Musique au tournant des siècles (Fayard, 2015) ISBN 9782213682501,
- Johannes Brahms – Chemins vers l'Absolu (Fayard, 2018) ISBN 9782213701646,
- François-Sappey, B.; Kippelen, E., eds. (2023). "Olivier Greif, d'éclat et de douleur". Euterpe (39–40). Les amis de la musique française. ISSN 2101-3691.,
- Clara Schumann, une icône romantique. Le Passeur. 2023. p. 326. ISBN 978-2-36890-975-1..

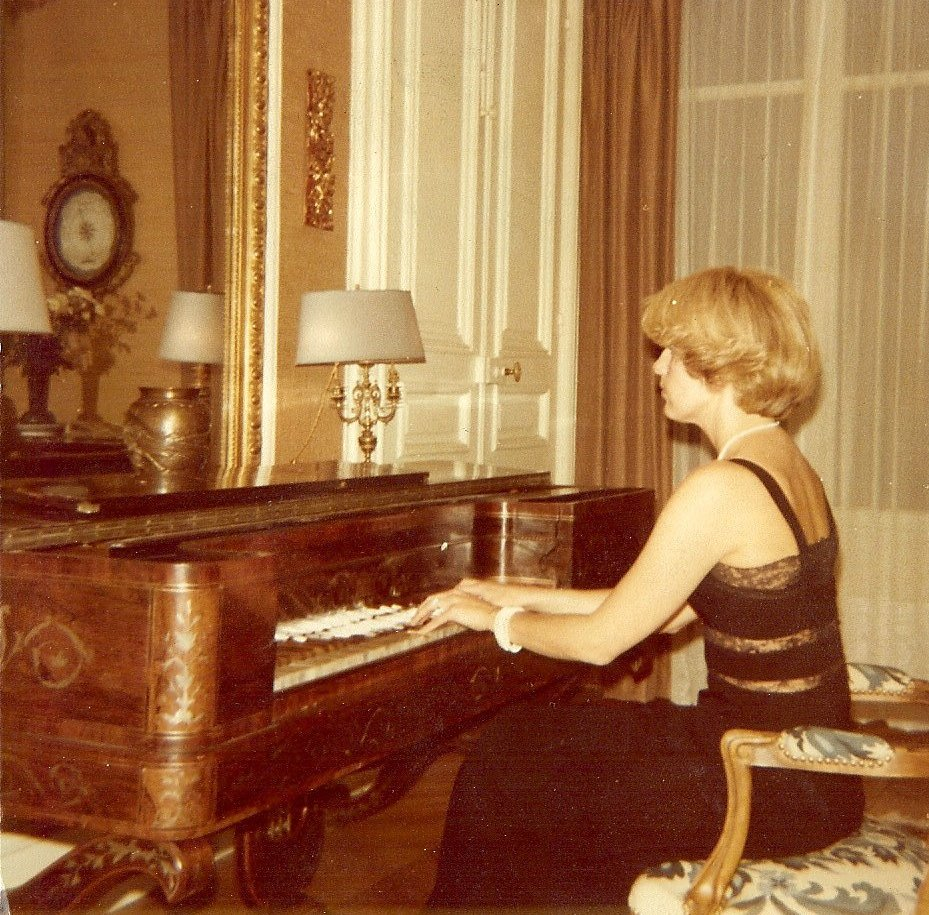
Brigitte François-Sappey playing the pianoforte

=== Chapters in ===
- 150 ans de musique française (Arles, Actes Sud, 1991),
- Le Quatuor à cordes en France (Paris, Association française pour le patrimoine musical, 1995),
- D'un opéra l'autre (Paris, Presses de l'Université de Paris-Sorbonne, 1996),
- Petite Encyclopédie de la Musique (Paris, Réunion des Musées nationaux, 1997),
- Le Conservatoire de Paris, 1795–1995. Deux cents ans de pédagogie (Paris, Buchet-Chastel, 1999).
- Comment devient-on universel ? (L'Harmattan, 2005), à propos de Mozart
- L'Universel (au) féminin (L'Harmattan, 2006),
- Preface to the reissue of Robert et Clara Schumann, Journal intime, (Buchet-Chastel, 2009) ISBN 9782283023877,
- Académie des Beaux-Arts « Chopin à Paris »,
- Le Concerto pour piano français à l'épreuve des modernités, (Actes Sud/Palazzetto Bru Zane, 2015),
- "Le chant de l'âme chez les musiciens romantiques allemands". Musiques de l'Âme. L'Harmattan. 2022. pp. 49–74. ISBN 978-2-343-25212-4..

=== Critical edition of musical works ===
- J.-F. Dandrieu (Minkoff, Schola Cantorum, Société française de Musicologie/Heugel),
- A. P. F. Boëly (Choudens, Lemoine, Zurfluh, Bornemann/Leduc, Durand),
- Olivier Greif, Editions Symétrie, Université Paris-Sorbonne *musicologie et Université Lyon 2).
