= Gilles Cantagrel =

French musicologist, writer, lecturer and music educator

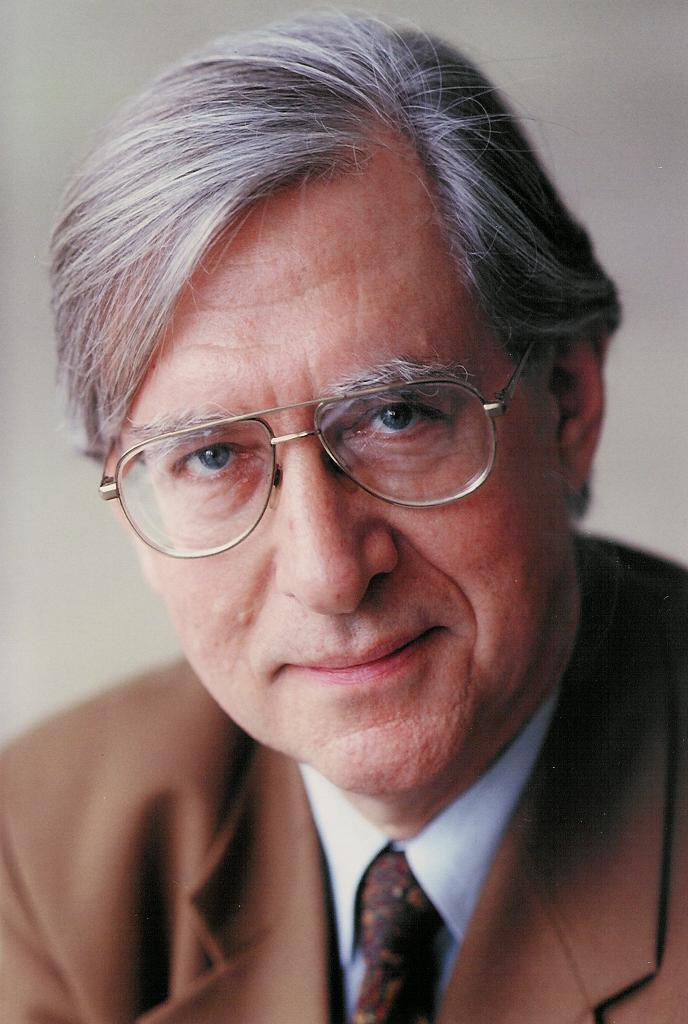
- Born: 20 November 1937 (age 88); Paris, France
- Education: École Normale de Musique de Paris; Conservatoire de Paris
- Occupations: Musicologist; Music educator
- Awards: Commandeur of the Ordre des Arts et des Lettres; Chevalier of the Legion of Honour; Recipient of the Order of Merit of the Federal Republic of Germany

Gilles Cantagrel (born 20 November 1937) is a French musicologist, writer, lecturer and music educator.

== Biography ==
Born in Paris, Cantagrel studied physics, art history and music at the École Normale de Musique de Paris and at the Conservatoire de Paris. He also practices organ and choral conducting. Since 1965, he has been focusing on journalism and communication and writes in magazines such as Harmonie and Diapason.

He became a producer of radio programs in France and abroad and directed the programmes of France Musique between 1984 and 1987. Artistic advisor to the director of France Musique, he was vice-president of the musical commission of the European Broadcasting Union.

He is the author of a series of films on the history of the pipe organ in Europe (4 DVDs). A teacher, lecturer, and animator, he took part in 1985 in the creation of the classical music fair "Musicora".

He was president of the "Association des grandes orgues" of Chartres from 2003 to 2008. He is a director of institutions such as the Centre de musique baroque de Versailles, and member of the Supervisory Board of the Bach Foundation in Leipzig.

In 2001, he was appointed member of the High Committee on National Commemorations by the Minister of Culture.

He has been a lecturer at the Paris-Sorbonne University, lecturer at the Conservatoire de Paris and at various conservatories and universities in France, Switzerland and Canada. He lectures in Europe in North America and participates in international competition juries.

He is chevalier de la Légion d'honneur, commandeur des Arts et Lettres, cross of the Order of Merit of the Federal Republic of Germany and holder of the golden distinction of the province of Vienna (Austria). In 2006, he was elected a correspondent of the Académie des Beaux-Arts.

== Publications ==
=== Works ===
- with Harry Halbreich (1976). Le livre d'or de l'orgue français (in French). Paris: Calliope/Marval. p. 203. OCLC 2911624. BnF 37441705r.
- Guide pratique du discophile (Paris, 1978)
- Dictionnaire des disques (Paris, 1981)
- Bach en son temps (Paris, 1982), new edition, reworked and expanded in 1997 ISBN 2213600074,
- Guide de la musique d'orgue (Paris, Fayard, 1991); edition, reworked and expanded in November 2012.
- The Orchestre national de France (with Claudette Douay), Tours, 1994,
- Guide de la mélodie et du lied (dir. with Brigitte François-Sappey), Paris, 1994 ISBN 9782213592107,
- Bach pédagogue, Marsyas (Paris, 1996)
- Le Moulin et la Rivière; Air et variations sur Bach. Les chemins de la musique (in French). Paris: Fayard. 1998. p. 664. ISBN 2213601283. OCLC 467090761. BnF 36709207j. (À partir de l'analyse des œuvres et des textes, des documents historiques, des traités musicaux, de la théologie, de la rhétorique, etc. (Grand Prix de littérature musicale de l'Académie Charles-Cros, Prix Catenacci de l'Académie des Beaux-Arts).)
- Passion Bach, l'album d'une vie (Paris, 2000), évocation du temps, de la vie et de la création de Jean-Sébastien Bach à la lumière de l'iconographie du XVIIIe
- Bach, Ars oratoria, Bach Pilgrimage (London, 2000)
- Unter dem Zeichen des Wassers, Triangel (Leipzig, 2000)
- Tempérament, Tonalités, Affects. Un exemple : si mineur, Ostinato Rigore (Paris, 2001)
- Musica e gola, Enciclopedia della Musica (Turin, 2002) - French edition Paris, 2004
- Georg Philipp Telemann ou le Célèbre Inconnu (Geneva, 2003-2005), first book in French about this composer ISBN 2940310157
- La Rencontre de Lübeck, Bach and Buxtehude (Paris, 2003) ISBN 9782220058085 New edition Paris, 2015
- Les plus beaux manuscrits de la musique classique on Babelio (Paris, 2003) ISBN 2-7324-2989-9
- Le Baroque et le Signe (Lyon, 2004)
- Les plus beaux manuscrits de Mozart (Paris, 2005) ISBN 2-7324-3266-0
- L'Europe du Baroque, ou le Concert des Nations (Paris, 2005)
- Mozart, Don Giovanni, le manuscrit (prix des Muses, Musicora), Paris, 2005 ISBN 2732432660
- Buxtehude et la musique en Allemagne du Nord dans la seconde moitié du XVIIe on WorldCat Paris, 2006 (prize René Dumesnil of the Académie des Beaux Arts, prize SACEM/Deauville de la biographie musicale et prix du Syndicat professionnel de la critique de théâtre, de musique et de danse) ISBN 221363100X
- Mozart (Paris, Académie des Beaux Arts, 2007)
- De Schütz à Bach. La musique du baroque en Allemagne (Fayard, 2008) ISBN 2213638322 OCLC 311743762
- J.S. Bach, de l'angoisse à la création (Paris, Académie de médecine, 2009)
- Les Cantates de Jean-Sébastien Bach (Fayard, 2010) ISBN 9782213644349
- J. S. Bach, Passions, Messes et Motets (Fayard, 2011) ISBN 9782213663029
- Bach, la Chair et l'Esprit, CD Book with 6 CD (Paris, Alpha, 2011),
- Mozart. Le Quintette en ré majeur (Paris, 2013),
- Carl Philipp Emanuel Bach et l’âge de la sensibilité (Geneva, 2013).
- Passion Baroque (Fayard, 2015) ISBN 9782213685908
- L'émotion musicale à l'âge baroque (Paris, Éditions du Seuil, 2016).

=== Direction or participation in collective publications ===
- Larousse de la musique,
- Dictionnaire des auteurs,
- Dictionnaire des œuvres,
- Encyclopaedia universalis,
- Grove Dictionary of musicians.
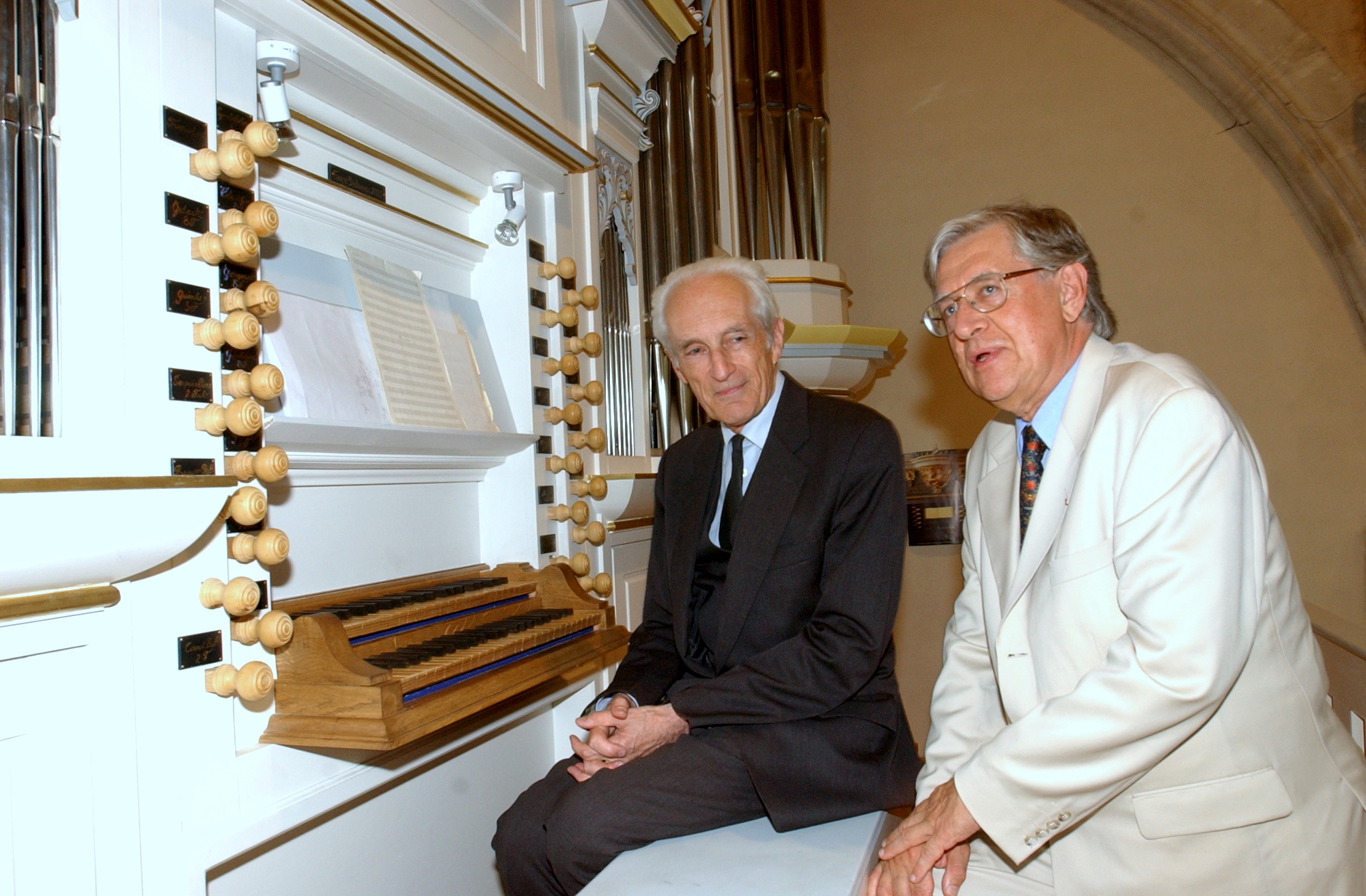
Gilles Cantagrel with Gustav Leonhardt at Pontaumur in 2004.

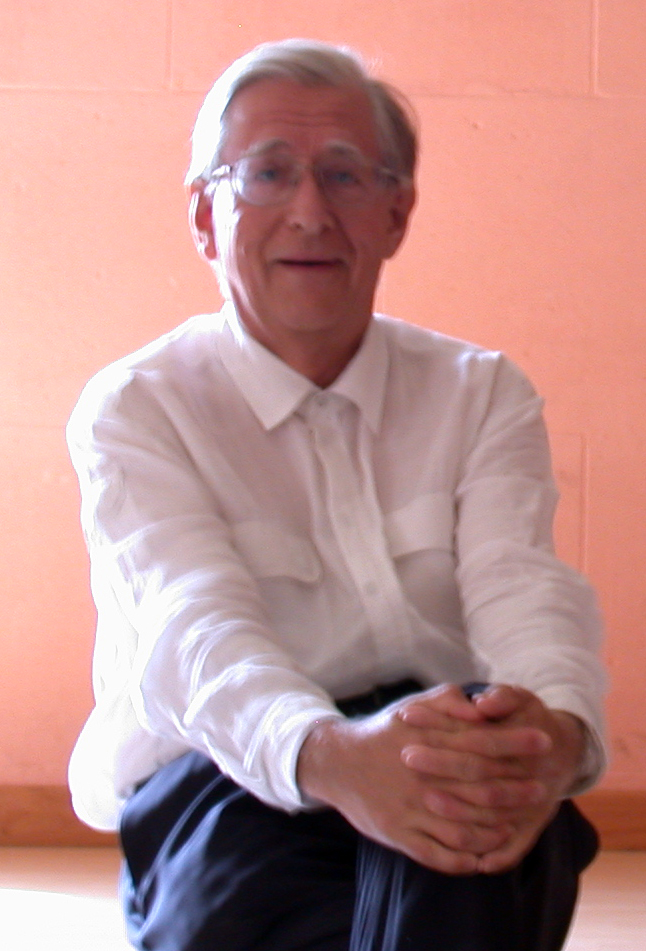
Gilles Cantagrel at the Festival Bach en Combrailles in 2005

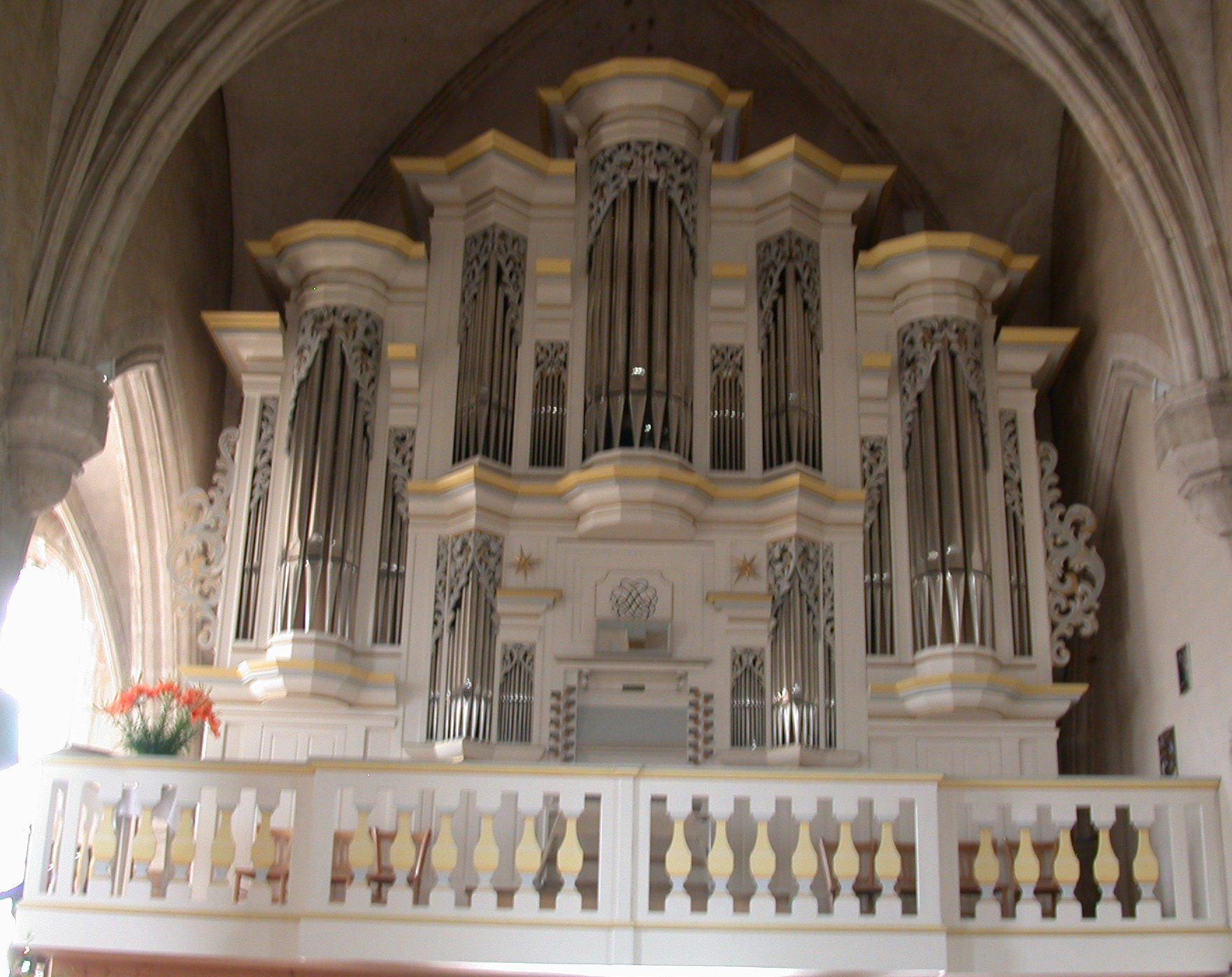
The Pontaumur organ, replica of that of Arnstadt (Thuringia)

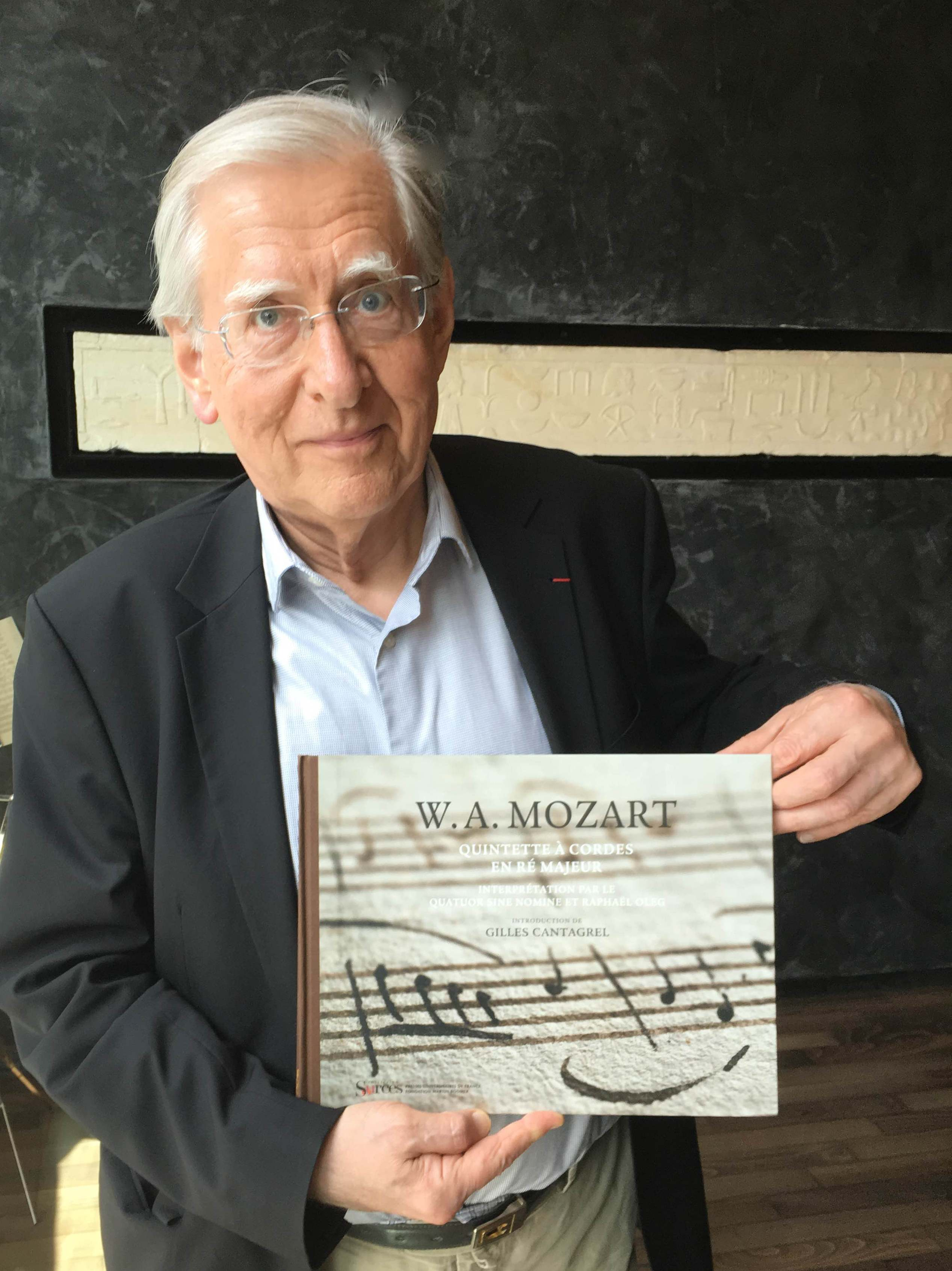
Foundation Bodmer in Geneva in 2016
