= Karev =

Karev (Russian: Карев) is a Slavic masculine surname with Kareva being its feminine counterpart. Notable people with the surname include:

- Alexei Karev (1879–1942), Russian painter
- Andrei Karev (born 1985), Belarusian ice hockey player
- Leonid Karev (born 1969), Russian composer, organist and pianist
- Nikola Karev (1877–1905), Macedonian revolutionary
- Sergei Karev (born 1986), Russian figure skater
- Yevgeni Karev (born 1985), Russian football player

Kareva is also an Estonian surname, both masculine and feminine

- Doris Kareva (born 1958), Estonian poet and translator

== Fictional ==
- Alex Karev, a character on the ABC television series Grey's Anatomy
