= Messe modale en septuor =

Modal mass by Jehan Alain

- Mass by Jehan Alain
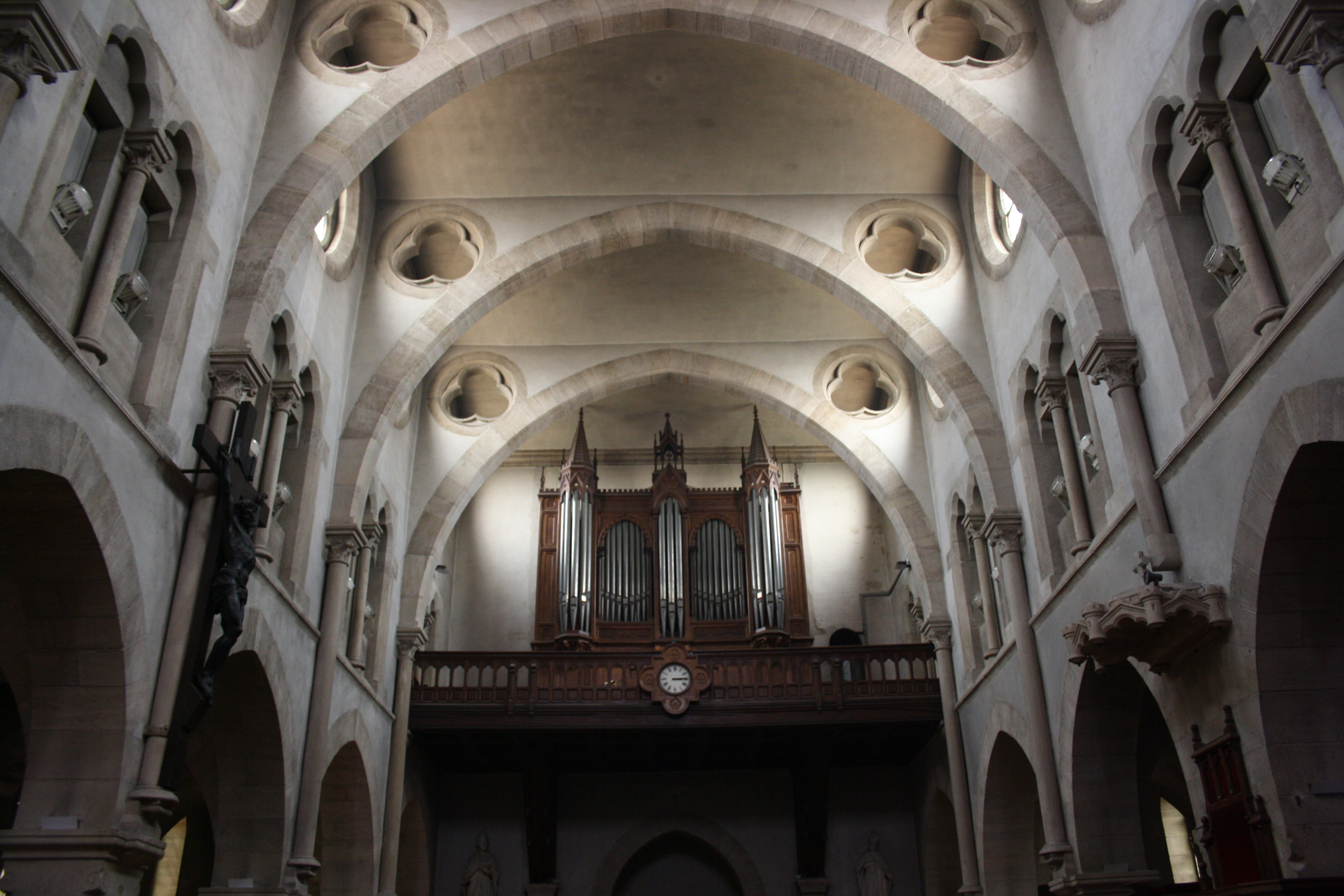
- Organ of Saint-Nicolas in Maisons-Laffitte
- English: Modal mass for septet
- Key: D
- Catalogue: JA 136
- Text: Mass ordinary
- Language: Latin
- Composed: 1938
- Published: 1965
- Movements: 4
- Scoring: soprano; alto; flute; string quartet or organ

Messe modale en septuor (Modal mass for septet), JA 136, is a modal mass for a septet by Jehan Alain completed in 1938. Inspired by a friend who was a flutist, he composed the setting of the Latin Mass ordinary for soprano, alto, flute and string quartet or organ. He wrote it for the church of Saint-Nicolas in Maisons-Laffitte where he was organist. It was published by Doblinger in 1965, after his death, initiated by his sister Marie-Claire Alain.

== History ==
Jehan Alain was regarded as an exceptional musical talent when he was shot in World War II, not even 30 years old. He composed the messe modale en septuor in 1938, for the church of Saint-Nicolas de Maisons-Laffitte. where he was organist. He set the Latin Mass ordinary three times, all the same year, and one of them a Requiem mass. The Messe modale is a modal mass for soprano, alto, flute and string quartet. Alternatively, the vocal parts and flute can be accompanied by an organ, or an organ can play ad libitum with the strings. The unusual setting was inspired by a friend who was a flutist. The mass was published, initiated by the composer's sister Marie-Claire Alain, by Doblinger, Vienna, in 1965.

== Structure and music ==
The music is structured in four sections, omitting a Credo:

1. Kyrie
2. Gloria
3. Sanctus
4. Agnus Dei

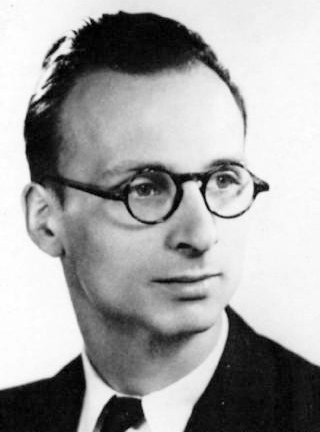
Jehan Alain in 1938

The duration is about 10 minutes. The vocal parts can be performed by a children's choir, a women's choir, or soloists. Like in other sacred works by Alain, the music is reminiscent of Gregorian chant, by mostly unison singing in flexible rhythm.

The Kyrie, marked Allegro, begins with an instrumental introduction, establishing the D Aeolian mode. The flute often plays as a third "voice", especially in the Gloria. The strings play a more active role with individual melodies in the Sanctus. The Sanctus is without a Benedictus section, because the church for which it was written had a tradition of performing a motet instead. The texture is reduced to three voices at the beginning of the Agnus Dei.

The meditative music incorporates elements from traditional church music and free jazz, with rhythms from Asian music; it is at times reminiscent of Claude Debussy and Olivier Messiaen. It has been described as an "independent, extremely colourful sound world" ("eigenständige, überaus farbintensive Klangwelt").

== Performance and recording ==
The Messe modale en septuor was performed by soloist singers and instruments during Alain's centennial celebration in 2011, at the Christuskirche, the German church of Paris, organised by Helga Schauerte-Maubouet.

The mass was recorded in 1990 (released in 1991) with Solistes de Camerata Saint-Louis, flutist Françoise Gyps, soprano Delphine Collot, contralto Gaelle Cheramy, and the Quatuor Ludwig, conducted by Georges Guillard. It was recorded in 2014 (released in 2016) by the Ensemble Vocal de Lausanne conducted by Michel Corboz, as part of a collection Schola aeterna : Chants à la vierge, focused on French sacred music from the late 19th and early 20th centuries. In 2005, it was part of the first complete recording of Alain's vocal music, with Marie-Claire Alain as the organist. For Jean Alain retrouvé : Oeuvre vocale, it was performed by the Ensemble Vocal Sequenza 9.3, conducted by Catherine Simonpietri.

== Cited sources ==
- Shrock, Dennis (2009). Choral Repertoire. Oxford University Press. p. 587. ISBN 978-0-19-532778-6.
- Lauterbach, Werner (19 September 2011). "Orgeltage-Konzert in Hamm beeindruckt mit Alain Jehan". Westdeutsche Allgemeine Zeitung (in German).
- Schauerte, Helga (2011). "Celebrating Jehan Alain's Centennial". helgaschauerte.fr.
- Ward, Geoffrey Harris (1997). "The three masses of Jehan Alain (1911-1940)" (PDF). kuscholarworks.ku.edu.
- "Jehan Alain retrouvé, intégrale de l'oeuvre vocale, incl. Premières discographiques, Jehan Alain rediscovered, complete vocal works, incl. First world recordings". lecen.eu (in French). 4 March 2022.
- "Messe modale en septuor". musicanet.org (in French). 2022.
- "Alain Jehan Ariste / 1911-1940". musicologie.org (in French). 2022.
- "Messe modale en septuor". muziekweb.nl (in Dutch). 2022.
- "Jehan Ariste Alain: JA 136 - Messe modale en septuor". provoxx.com (in French). 2022.
- "Messe modale en septuor". stretta-music.com. 2022.
