= Albert Renaud (organist) =

French organist and composer

Albert Félix Joseph Renaud (1855 – 28 May 1924) was a French organist and composer who served for many years as organist at the parish church of Saint-Germain-en-Laye, near Paris.

== Life and career ==
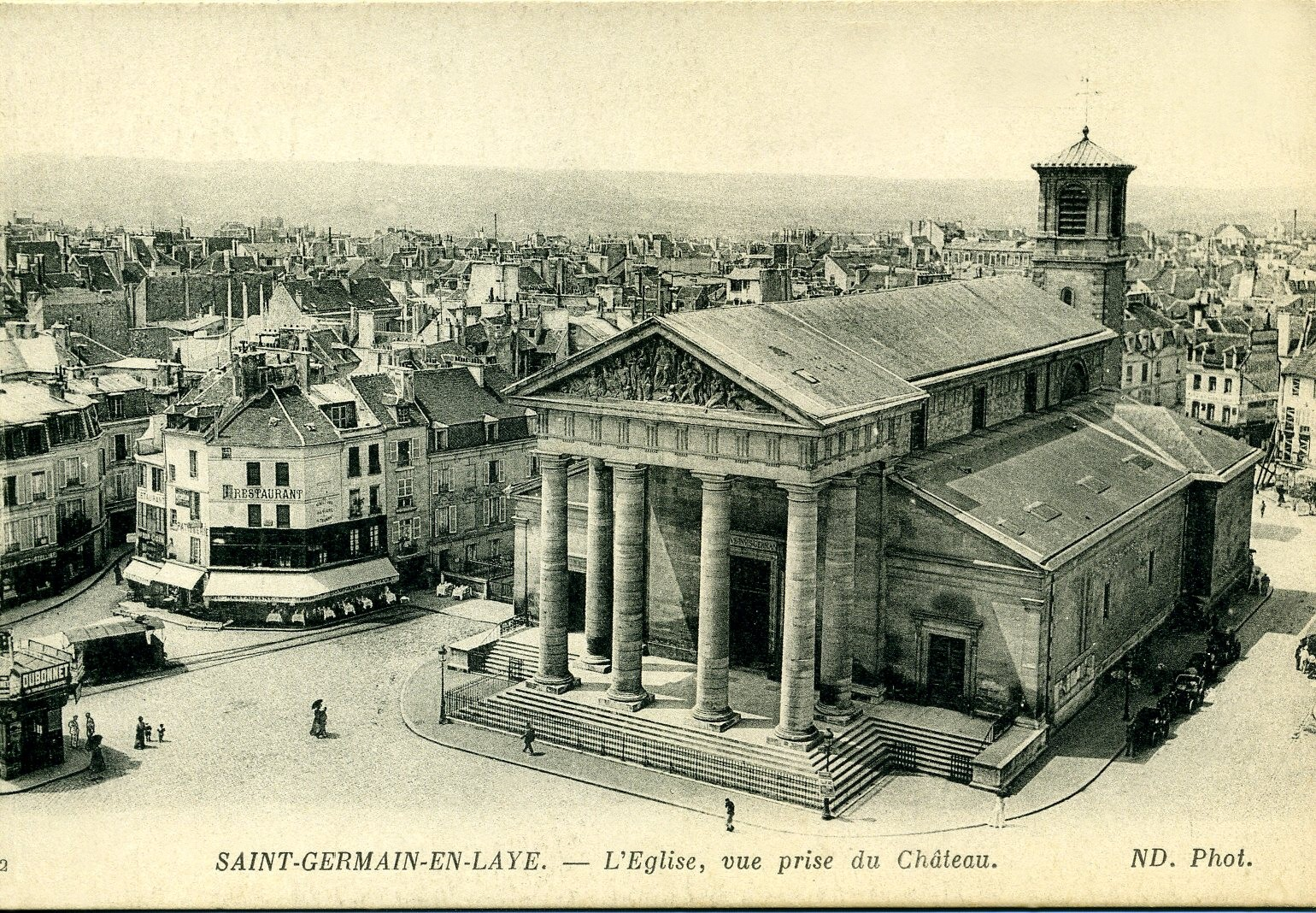
Saint-Germain-en-Laye parish church, where Renaud was organist from 1891 to 1924.

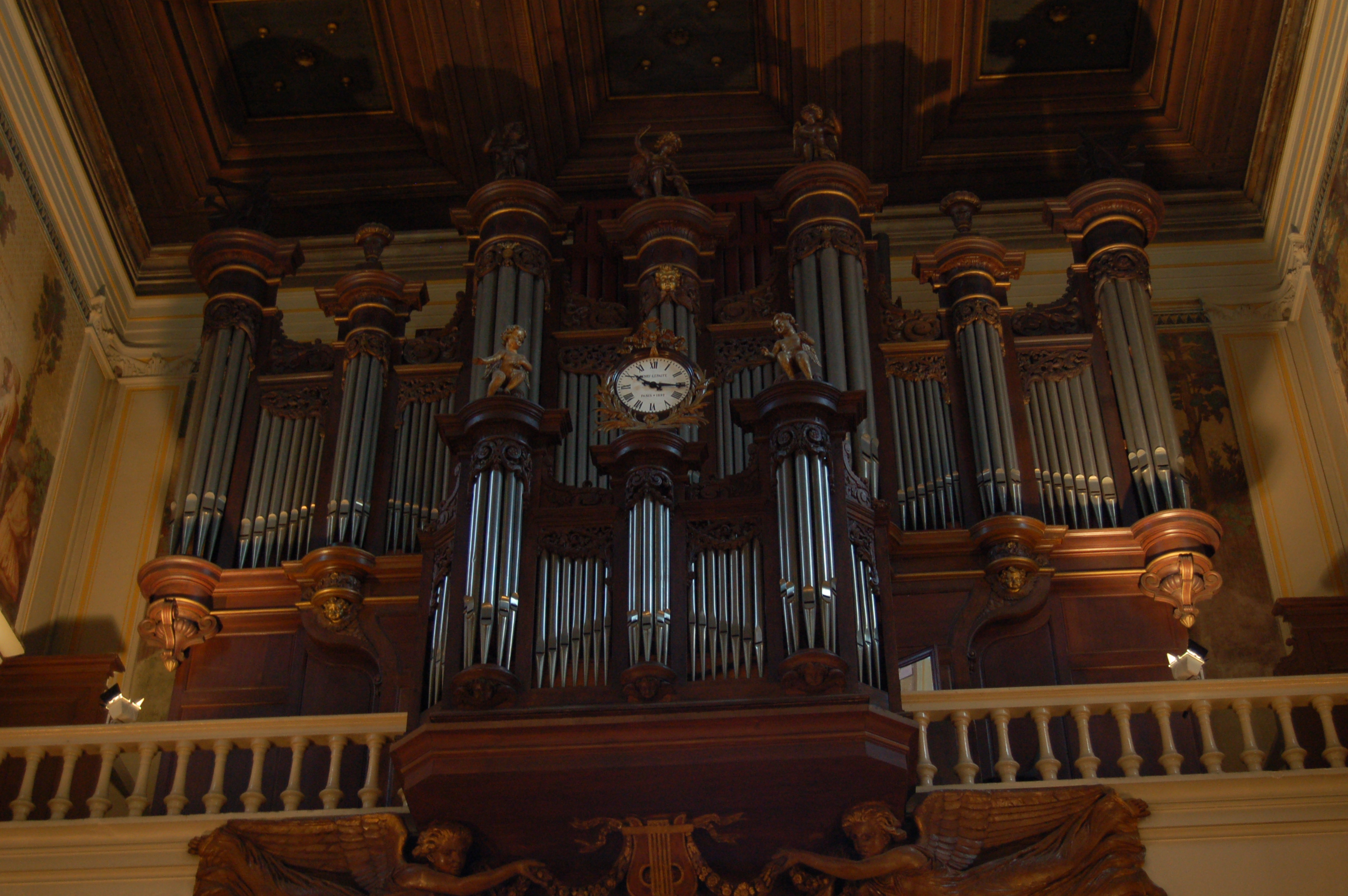
The organ of Saint-Germain-en-Laye parish church.

Born in the 6th arrondissement of Paris, Renaud studied at the Conservatoire de Paris under César Franck, Camille Saint-Saens, Charles Gounod and Jules Massenet and began his career by succeeding his father Félix as choirmaster of the Church of Saint-Sulpice in Paris.

After a spell as organist at Rennes Cathedral, he returned to Paris in 1878 as organist of the Church of Saint-François-Xavier. In 1891 he became organist at the parish church of Saint-Germain-en-Laye, serving until his death. In 1903 he oversaw the refurbishment of the church's Cavaillé-Coll organ, marking the completion of the work with a concert on 27 October at which Alexandre Guilmant and Eugène Gigout also played.

His successor at Saint-Germain-en-Laye was Albert Alain, father of organists Jehan, Olivier and Marie-Claire Alain.

== Compositions ==
Renaud's best known work is his Toccata in D minor (Op. 108, No. 1), which he dedicated to Alexandre Guilmant. Guilmant played it during a recital at the St. Louis World's Fair in 1904. He also wrote piano, orchestral and choral works as well as opera and ballet music.

=== List of works ===
For organ

- Quatre pièces d'orgue (Op. 101, No. 1 (Entrée, processional), No. 2 (Angelus), No. 3 (Pastorale) and No. 4 (Marche funèbre))
- Improvisations - soixante pièces classées par tons pour orgue ou harmonium (Op. 106)
- Deux toccatas (Op. 108, No. 1 (in D minor) and No. 2 (in D major))
- Quatre pièces d'orgue (Op. 116, including No. 1 (Offertoire in E minor) and No. 3 (Communion in F major))
- Esquisses - trente pièces pour orgue ou harmonium (Op. 120)
- Grand choeur, Op. 123 (No. 1 in D major)

Opera

- Le petit chaperon rouge (1885)

Ballet

- Roknedin (1892)

Other

- Un voyage à Venise (1896)
