= Jean-Baptiste Lesueur =

French architect (1794–1883)

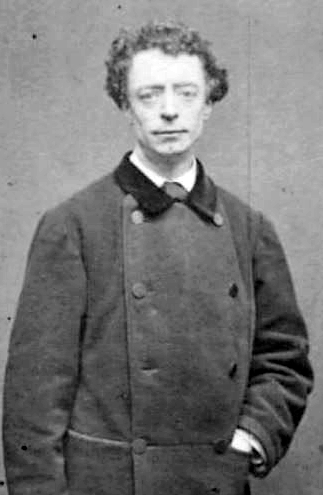
Jean-Baptiste Lesueur (before 1860)

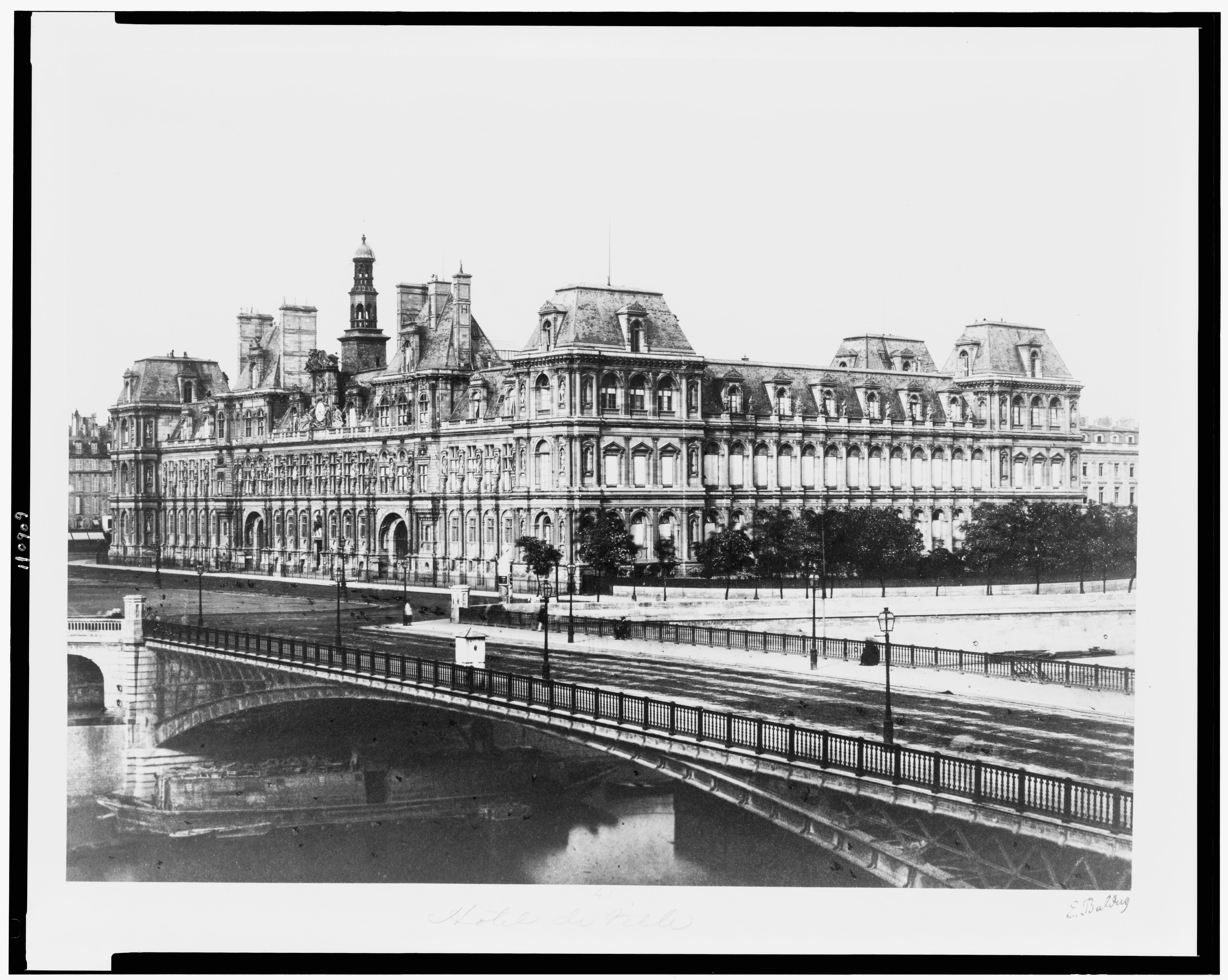
The City Hall in 1851, photograph by Édouard Baldus

Jean-Baptiste Cicéron Lesueur (5 October 1794, Clairefontaine-en-Yvelines - 25 December 1883, Paris) was a French architect, best known for his work on the Paris City Hall (Hôtel de Ville).

== Biography ==
In 1811, he entered the École des Beaux-Arts, where he studied with Charles Percier and Auguste Famin. He won the Prix de Rome in 1819, with his design for a memorial cemetery. While in Rome, he made a study of the Basilica Ulpia, which was being excavated. Upon returning to Paris in 1826, he was engaged to build a parish church in Vincennes, which kept him occupied until 1830.

When the Comte de Rambuteau became Prefect of the Département de la Seine in 1833, he reconsidered a plan to expand the Paris City Hall, proposed by Étienne-Hippolyte Godde, which had been rejected by his predecessor, due to lack of funds. He eventually called on Godde and Lesueur to develop new plans. Their proposal was approved by the Ministry of the Interior in 1836, and construction began the following year. Work was halted by the Revolution of 1848, but resumed after the proclamation of the Second Republic. The final decorative work was done between 1854 and 1866. It was destroyed only a few years later, in 1871, during the Commune.

During this time, in 1842, the city of Saint-Germain-en-Laye bought the seventeenth-century Hôtel de la Rochefoucault, to make it the Town Hall. The project was designed by Lesueur and a local architect named Adam. Four years later, his manuscript Chronologie des rois d'Égypte (Chronology of the Kings of Egypt), received an award from the Académie des Inscriptions et Belles-Lettres and was printed by the French government.

In 1848, after the Revolution, he was appointed to the Académie des Beaux-Arts, where he took Seat #2 for architecture; succeeding Antoine Vaudoyer (deceased). Following the death of Abel Blouet, in 1852, he was named Professor of Theory at the École, and a member of the jury. He also served as an architectural curator for the City of Paris. At the request of François Bartholoni, first President of the Lyon-Geneva Railway Company, Lesueur designed a new building for the Geneva Music Conservatory. Construction began in 1856 and was completed in 1858.

He was awarded the Royal Gold Medal of the Royal Institute of British Architects in 1861, and was made an Officer of the Legion of Honor in 1870. During his later years, he published two works, La basilique Ulpienne (Rome) Restauration exécutée en 1823 (1877), and Histoire et théorie de l'architecture (1879).
