= Jean Guillou =

French composer, organist, and pianist (1930–2019)

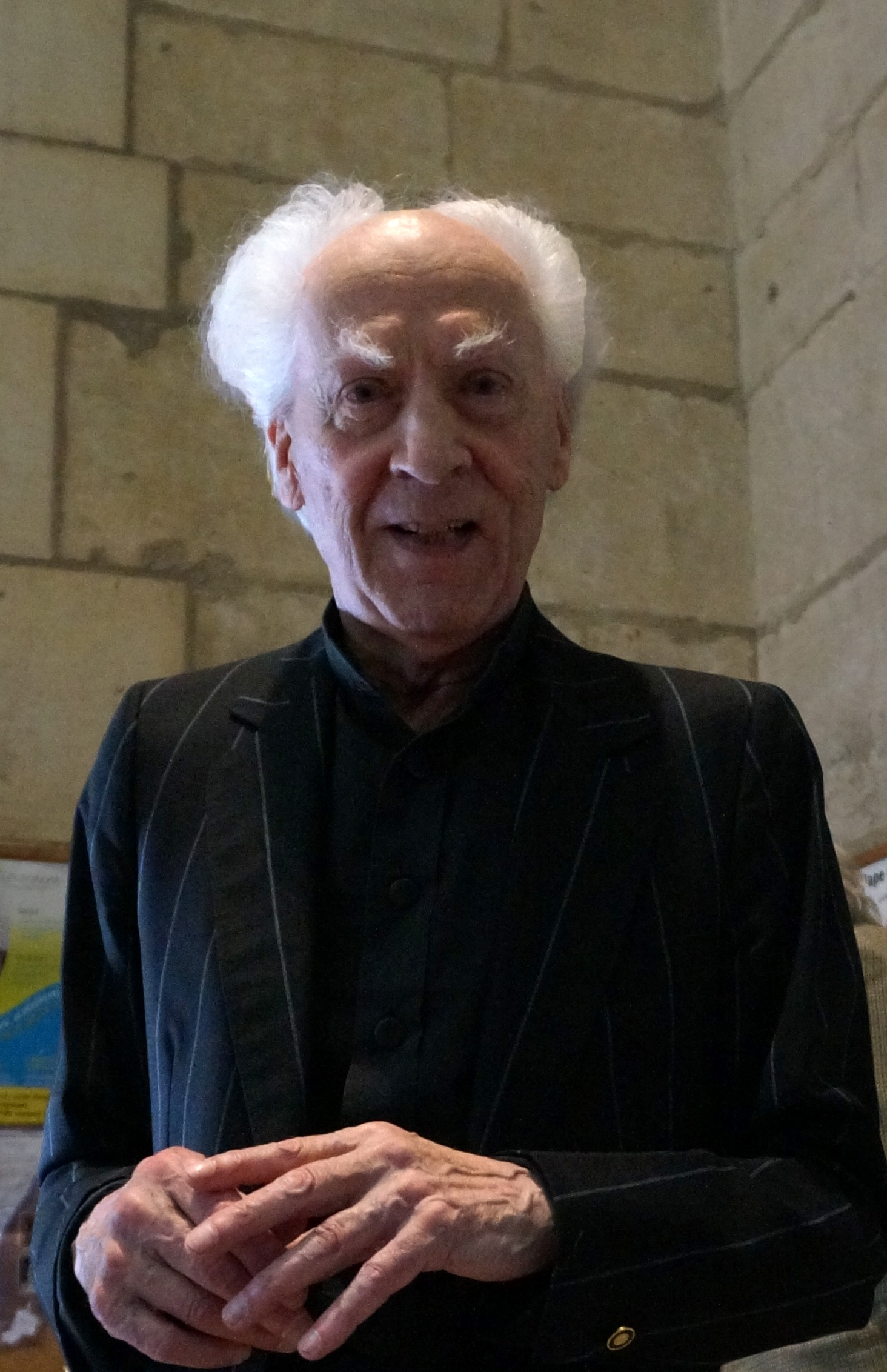
- Jean Guillou, 2014
- Born: Jean Victor Arthur Guillou; 18 April 1930; Angers, France
- Died: 26 January 2019 (aged 88); Paris, France
- Education: Paris Conservatoire
- Occupations: Organist; Pianist; Improviser; Composer; Academic teacher
- Organizations: Saint-Eustache, Paris
- Website: www.jean-guillou.org

Jean Victor Arthur Guillou (18 April 1930 – 26 January 2019) was a French composer, organist, pianist, and pedagogue. Principal Organist at Saint Eustache in Paris, from 1963 to 2015, he was widely known as a composer of instrumental and vocal music focused on the organ, as an improviser, and as an adviser to organ builders. For several decades he held regular master classes in Zurich and in Paris.

== Career ==
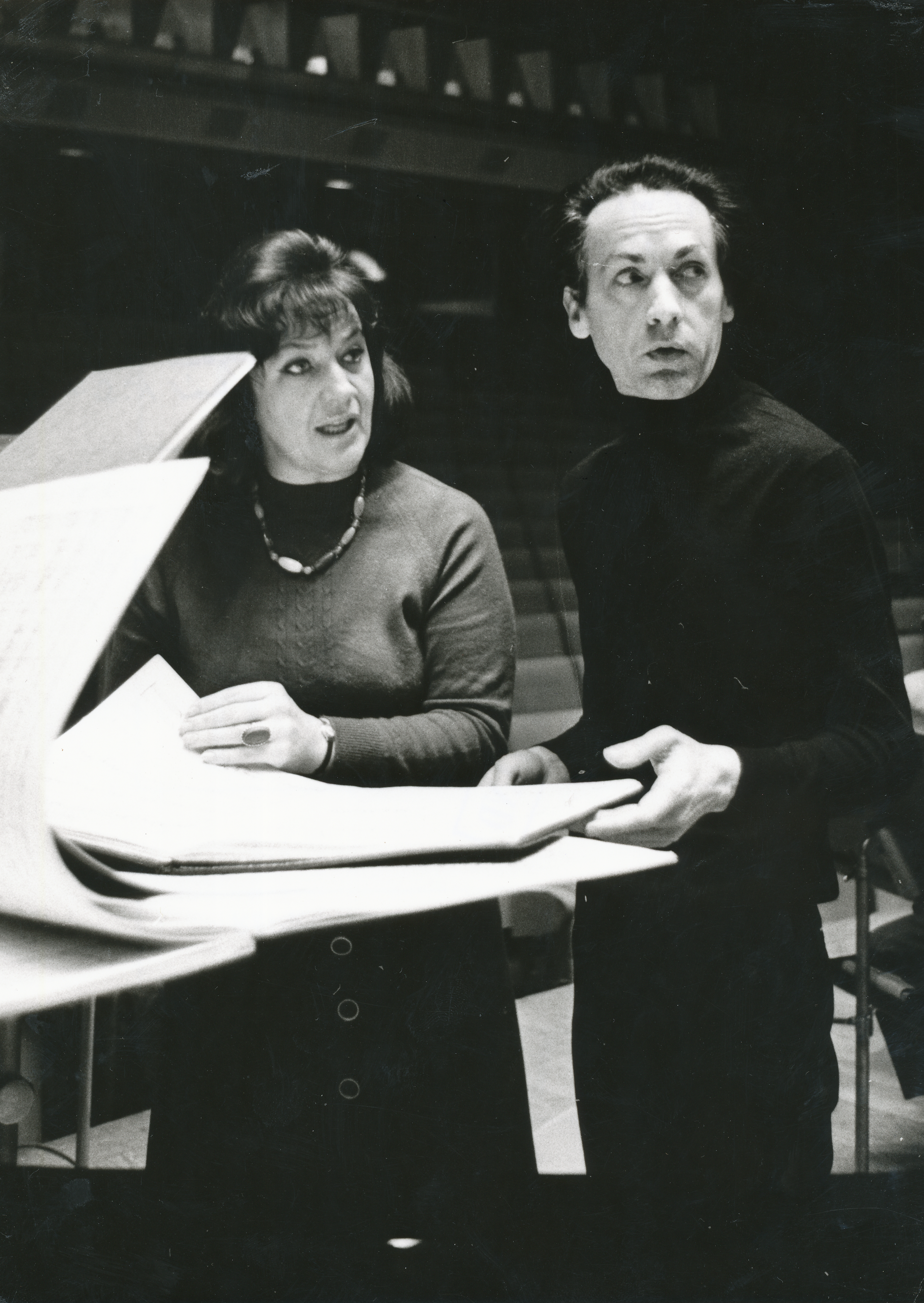
Polish singer Krystyna Szostek-Radkowa before the Paris premiere of Judith's Symphonie with Guillou, 1971

Guillou was born in Angers. Following his first studies in piano and organ, he became the organist at the church St. Serge in Angers at the age of 12. He studied at the Paris Conservatoire under Marcel Dupré, Maurice Duruflé and Olivier Messiaen. In 1952, while still studying, Guillou played the premiere of his organ transcription of The Musical Offering by Johann Sebastian Bach at Erskine and American United Church in Montreal, Canada. In 1955, he accepted a position as professor of organ and composition at the Institute of Sacred Music in Lisbon. During this time, he wrote his first compositions (Fantaisie op. 1, Colloque no. 1, and parts of Colloque no. 2). Due to health reasons, Guillou underwent long term medical treatment in Berlin and relocated to this city in 1958. During the following five years, he composed numerous works and made his first recordings at Lutherkirche and St. Matthias church. During this time, he met composer Max Baumann, who wrote his first organ compositions (Invocation op. 67 no. 5, Trois pièces brèves op. 67 no. 6, Psalmi op. 67 no. 2) for Guillou, who premiered these works in a concert on 20 January 1963 at St. Matthias church in Berlin. In 1963 he returned to Paris, having been appointed Principle Organist at Saint-Eustache in succession to André Marchal. He would play on the instrument there, the second largest organ in France, for more than 50 years, until 2015. Appointed Organiste Titulaire Emerite at St. Eustache in September 2014, Guillou completed 52 years as organist at Saint-Eustache in March 2015, when he was succeeded by two co-titulaires. On 22 April 1966 Guillou gave his debut concert at the Berliner Philharmonie, where he played Max Reger's Phantasia and Fugue on BACH op. 46 at the occasion of the Fiftieth Anniversary of Reger's death. On 6 October 1966 Guillou played the world premiere of his organ work Pour le Tombeau de Colbert at the Berliner Philharmonie.

He had a worldwide reputation as a concert organist and improviser. Additionally, he often performed as a pianist. He gave the English and French premieres of Julius Reubke's Piano Sonata in B-flat minor.

Guillou's engagement in organ building led to collaborations with several organ builders and the construction of new instruments, including in the Tonhalle of Zurich and in the Auditorio de Tenerife.

He composed over 90 works – for organ, chamber and orchestral music – as well as numerous transcriptions for organ, originally published by Éditions Alphonse Leduc, from 2000 and later by Schott Music, Mainz. In addition, he has issued more than 100 recordings (Philips, Dorian, Festivo, Decca, Augure among others) including the complete organ works of Johann Sebastian Bach, César Franck, Robert Schumann, numerous improvisations (e.g., Visions Cosmiques (December 1968), or Jeux d'orgue (20 October 1969), both re-edited in 2010 by Universal-Decca), as well as most of his own organ compositions on a series of seven CDs (2010) for the Universal-Decca label.

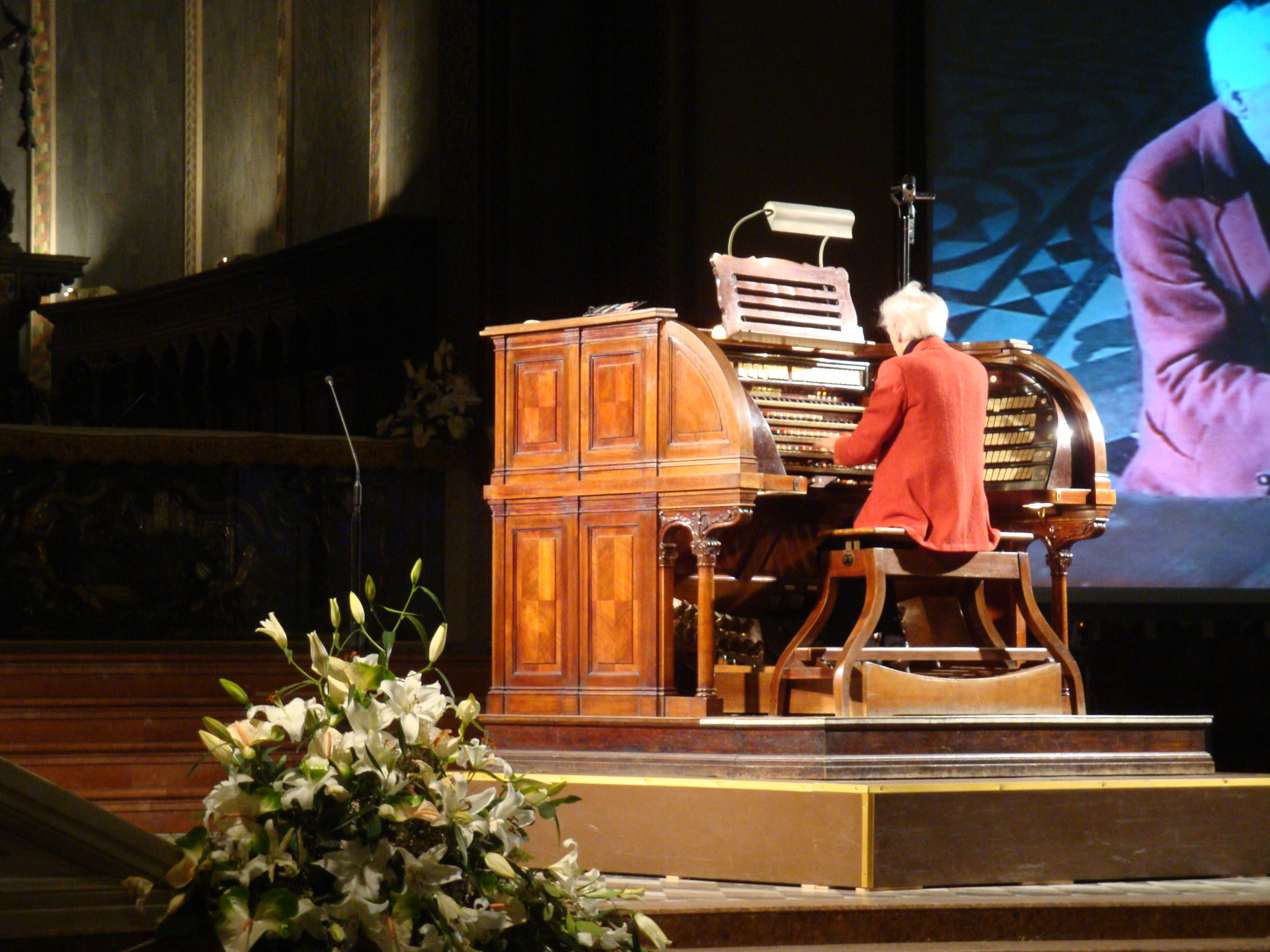
Jean Guillou at the Great Tamburini Organ of Messina Cathedral during the commemorative concert for the 1908 earthquake (held on 27 December 2008)

Some of Guillou's compositions are based upon his own lyrics and poems. He also published several books, which subsequently were translated into German and Italian: L'Orgue – Souvenir et Avenir (1978), La Musique et le Geste (2012), and Le Visiteur, Poèmes (2014).

From 1970 to 2005, Guillou taught organ performance and improvisation at the annual Internationale Meisterkurse Zürich. Beginning in 2007, these masterclasses were held at Saint-Eustache in Paris, France, for several years. Among his pupils are Zsuzsa Elekes, Francesco Filidei, Bernhard Haas, Jean Jacques Kasel, Yanka Hekimova, Jean-Paul Imbert, Leonid Karev, Livia Mazzanti, Zuzana Ferjenčíková and Jean-Baptiste Monnot. In July 2015, he was appointed honorary professor at the Hochschule für Musik Saar in Saarbrücken. In March 2018, Guillou was honored by the Royal College of Organists at Southwark Cathedral in London with the RCO Medal, in recognition of distinguished achievement in organ playing and composition. In May 2018, he travelled to Koper, Slovenia, where he served as consultant for the former organ at Tonhalle Zürich, to be transferred to Assumption Cathedral, and the re-dedication scheduled for 2020.

== Death ==
Guillou died in Paris on 26 January 2019. The funeral service took place on 5 February 2019 at Notre-Dame de Paris. He was buried at the Père Lachaise Cemetery in Paris (Chemin du Quinconce, D1/4547).

The obituary by his publisher Schott summarized his achievements:

As a performer he revolutionized the art of organ playing, as an improviser he fascinated whole generations of concert-goers, as a composer he opened the repertoire of the 'king of instruments' to areas which had been considered to be unimaginable before.

== Publications ==
- L'Orgue, Souvenir et Avenir. Lyon: Symétrie. 2010.
- Die Orgel: Erinnerung und Zukunft. St. Augustin, Germany: Dr. Josef Butz Musikverlag. 2005. ISBN 3-928412-01-9.
- La Musique et le Geste. Paris: Beauchesne. 2012. ISBN 978-2-7010-1999-4.
- Le Visiteur, Poèmes. Rouen: Christophe Chomant Editeur. 2014. ISBN 978-2-84962-305-3.

== Bibliography ==
- Abbing, Jörg. Jean Guillou – Colloques – Biografie und Texte. St. Augustin, Germany: Dr. Josef Butz Musikverlag, 2006. ISBN 3-928412-02-7.
- Abbing, Jörg: Die Rhetorik des Feuers — La rhétorique du feu. Festschrift Jean Guillou. Bonn, Germany: Dr. Josef Butz Musikverlag, 2010. ISBN 978-3-928412-10-0.
- Abbing, Jörg: "Ein nachdenklicher Wanderer zwischen den Welten. Ein Nachruf auf Jean Guillou", in Organ – Journal für die Orgel 22, no. 1: 8–9.
- Kasel Jean-Jacques "JEAN GUILLOU-Portrait de Maître" 389 p. fr/ger selfpublished
- Adolph, Wolfram: "Editorial zum Tod von Jean Guillou", in Organ – Journal für die Orgel 22, no. 1: 1.
- L'ORGUE n° 281: numéro spécial sur Jean Guillou, sous la direction de Sylviane Falcinelli, 2008.
- Cantagrel, Gilles. "Jean Guillou", in Guide de la musique d’orgue, edited by Gilles Cantagrel. Paris: Fayard, (1991) 2012, pp. 514–520.
- Cook, Mary Jean. "Errata in the published organ works of Jean Guillou", in The Diapason 67 (May 1967): 4–5.
- Hodant, Jean-Philippe. Rhétorique et Dramaturgie dans l'œuvre musicale de Jean Guillou Paris, France: Université Sorbonne, 1993.
- Tobias Leschke: Jean Guillous frühe Orgelwerke: Komposition und Ästhetik (Schriften der Hochschule für Musik Saar). Baden-Baden: Georg Olms Verlag 2026. ISBN 978-3-487-17223-1.
- Orengia, Jean-Louis. Jean Guillou, interprète, compositeur et improvisateur. Mémoire de maîtrise de musicologie. Paris: Sorbonne, 1981/1982.
- Rhodes, Cherry. "Introducing Jean Guillou", in The A.G.O.R.C.C.O. Magazine (March 1974): 29 and 53.
- Terry, Mickey Thomas. "An Interview with Jean Guillou" in The American Organist 28, No. 4 (April 1994): 56–59.
- VV.AA. '"Regards". Hommages à Jean Guillou – Augure éditions, Paris 2014.
