= Chanson à bouche fermée =

Choral music by Jehan Alain

- Choral music by Jehan Alain
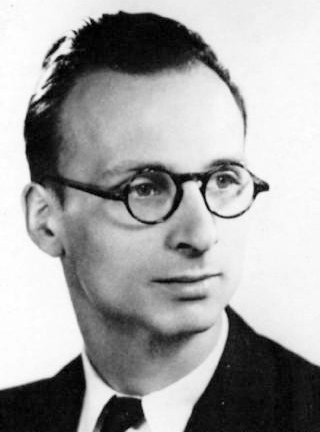
- Alain in 1938
- English: Song for closed mouth
- Catalogue: JA 039
- Text: no text
- Composed: 1933
- Published: 1989
- Scoring: SATB a cappella

Chanson à bouche fermée (Song for closed mouth), JA 039, is a composition for unaccompanied four-part choir by Jehan Alain. He wrote the music in 1933. It is to be performed with closed mouth. It was published in 1989, edited by his sister Marie-Claire Alain.

== History ==
Jehan Alain composed Chanson à bouche fermée in 1933 for a four-part choir (SATB), to be sung without text and with closed mouth, in the Chant à bouche fermée vocal technique. It is one of few secular choral works by Alain. It was published in 1989 by Editions de la Schola Cantorum, edited by his sister, the organist Marie-Claire Alain.

== Music ==
The music is written in G minor and common time. The duration is about three minutes. It has the character of a lullaby, with a gentle swing of simple melodic motifs. The first motiv has only three notes, with beginning and ending with G, the ending being a sequence of eighth-notes G-A-G-A-G. This characteristic figure appears in the four voices at different times and levels. The music begins softly, is carefully marked for crescendo and decrescendo and ends perdendoso, fading away.

The music is repeated, and then seems to begin another repetition, creating a sense of a "perpetual movement". The harmonies are modal, and use some distant tones for colouring.

== Performance and recording ==
Chanson à bouche fermée was included in a concert program of the Maîtrise de Radio France and Maîtrise de Radio France - Maîtrise Notre-Dame de Paris at Notre-Dame de Paris on 17 November 2017, in a program of French choral music around 1900, including Poulenc's Litanies à la Vierge noire and Duruflé's Quatre Motets sur des thèmes grégoriens. The program was broadcast by Radio France.

The piece was recorded in 1999 by the Camerata Saint Louis, conducted by Georges Guillard, and in 2005 by the Ensemble Vocal Sequenza 9.3, conducted by Catherine Simonpietri. It was included in the first complete recording of Alain's vocal music. Jean Alain retrouvé : Oeuvre vocale, which was recorded in 2004 and released in 2005, performed by the vocal ensemble Sequenza 9.3 conducted by Catherine Simonpietri.

== Cited sources ==
- "Alain - Chanson à bouche fermée". ensemble-exprime.fr (in French).
- "Jehan Alain retrouvé, intégrale de l'oeuvre vocale, incl. Premières discographiques, Jehan Alain rediscovered, complete vocal works, incl. First world recordings". lecen.eu. 2022.
- "Alain - Chanson à bouche fermée". musicanet.org (in French). 2021.
- "Chanson à bouche fermée AWV.40, JA.39". muziekweb.nl (in Dutch). 2022.
- "La Maîtrise hors les murs". maisondelaradioetdelamusique.fr (in French). 2022.
- "Chanson à bouche fermée" (PDF). schola-editions.com. 2022.
