= Max Baumann =

German composer

Max Georg Baumann (20 November 1917, Kronach – 17 July 1999, Berlin) was a German composer.

== Biography ==
He studied conducting, piano, and trombone Berlin Hochschule für Musik with Konrad Friedrich Noetel and Boris Blacher. He spent two years as a choir director and deputy Kapellmeister at the opera in Stralsund (1947–1949). He taught piano and music theory at the Berlin College of Music (1946–1978). In 1960 he was appointed professor. After meeting French organist Jean Guillou during this time, Baumann wrote his first compositions for organ (Invocation op. 67 no. 5, Trois pièces brèves op. 67 no. 6, Psalmi op. 67 no. 2), which Guillou premiered in a concert on January 20, 1963, at St. Matthias church in Berlin. Baumann also appeared as conductor and choirmaster and, in 1963, became interim conductor of the choir at St. Hedwig's Cathedral. His cantata Libertas cruciata was the first composition written specifically with stereo FM radio in mind.

== Awards ==
- 1953: Berlin Art Prize.
- 1963: Prix Italia for the Dramatic Cantata Libertas cruciata - the first stereophonic work.
- 1977: Gold Medal "for special merits" by the district Kronach.
- 1977: Golden Orlando di Lasso Medal of general Cecilia Association.
- 1986: Commander of St Gregory with Star, appointed by Pope John Paul II.

== Works ==
- Change of Scenes, Op. 83 (1968) for flute and piano
- Coming of the Lord, Op. 66 (1959), Advent cycle for Choir
- Concertino for recorder, guitar, and mandolin orchestra, Op. 38 no. 2
- Concerto for Piano and Orchestra, Op. 36 (1953)
- Concerto for Organ, Strings and Timpani, Op. 70 (1964)
- Duo op. 62 no. 1 (1958) for cello and guitar
- Five Songs, Op. 9 (1947) for baritone and piano
- German Vespers, Op. 64 (1960) for soprano, speaker ad lib., choir, and orchestra
- Invocation, Op. 67 no. 5 (1962) for organ
- Libertas cruciata. Dramatic Cantata, Op. 71 (1963), for soloists, speaker, speech choir, chorus and large orchestra
- Mass: Guardian Angel, Op. 50 (1955) for SATB. Choir (organ ad lib.)
- Octet for Strings, Clarinet, Bassoon and Horn, Op. 72 (1964)
- Orchestral Variations, Op. 29 (1951)
- Pater Noster, Op. 51 (1955) for mixed choir
- Pelléas and Mélisande. Ballet (after Maurice Maeterlinck), Op. 44 (1954)
- Perspectives I, Op. 55 (1957) for large orchestra
- Psalmi, Op. 67 no. 2 (1962) for organ
- Resurrection, Op. 94 (1980) for soprano, baritone, bass, narrators, choir, and orchestra
- Serenata italiana danzante for Plucked Instruments
- Sonata, Op. 8 (1947) for cello and piano
- Sonatina, Op. 13 (1949) for violin and piano
- Sonatina, Op. 74 (1963) for organ
- String Quartet no. 3, Op. 33 (1953)
- Symphony no. 1, Op. 14 (1949)
- Symphony no. 2, Op. 15 (1950)
- Tafelmusik for Plucked Instruments
- Three Duets, Op. 40 (1953) for two violins
- Three Little Pieces, Op. 35 (c. 1954) for piano
- Trois pièces brèves, Op. 67 no. 6 (1962) for organ
