= Albert Renaud =

Albert Renaud may refer to:

- Albert Renaud (organist) (1855−1924), French organist and composer
- Albert Renaud (ice hockey) (1920−2021), Canadian ice hockey player
