= Albert Alain =

French organist and composer

- Born: 1 March 1880; Saint-Germain-en-Laye, France
- Died: 15 November 1971 (aged 91); Saint-Germain-en-Laye
- Education: Conservatoire de Paris
- Occupations: Organist; Music educator

Albert Paul Alain (1 March 1880 – 15 October 1971) was a 20th-century French organist and composer.

== Biography ==
Born in Saint-Germain-en-Laye to Clarisse-Alphonsine Fouquet (born 1859) and Paul François Alain (born 1851), he entered in adulthood into the Conservatoire de Paris and obtained a first prize for harmony in 1904. He pursued counterpoint studies with Georges Caussade, fugue and music composition with Charles Lenepveu and Gabriel Fauré, at the same time as he worked on the organ with Guilmant and Louis Vierne. In 1924, succeeding Albert Renaud, he became organist of the church of Saint-Germain-en-Laye, a position he held until his death.

Passionate about organ building, he built over the years (1911–1970) an instrument with 4 keyboards and 43 stops in his house. This organ is now installed in Romainmôtier, Switzerland.

He married Magdeleine Alberty in 1910, and they became parents of four children with exceptional gifts: Jehan, Marie-Odile, Olivier and Marie-Claire.

== Alain family tree ==
*Albert Alain

  - Jehan Alain (1911–1940), organist, composer and soldier
  - Marie-Odile Alain (1914–1937), organist
  - Olivier Alain (1918–1994), organist, pianist, musicologist and composer
  - Marie-Claire Alain (1926–2013), organist and scholar

== Works ==
As a composer of religious music, he is responsible for 469 pieces, among others:

=== Organ and harmonium ===
- Final sur le carillon de Luçon Op. 324
- Scherzo pour grand orgue
- Andante pour grand orgue
- 5 Pièces faciles en forme de Messe Basse
- Pièces pour orgue ou harmonium in Les Maîtres contemporains de l’orgue, by Joseph Joubert (abbot),

vol. 4 : Offertoire pour la semaine de Pâques sur l’Antienne Vespere et la Prose O Filii; Marche nuptiale (1900);
vol. 7 : Alla Hændel, Alla Bach, Alla Franck pour grand orgue avec pédale (1914). Cf. Pièces d'orgue, 1st series.

- Pièces d'orgue, 2nd series, Sénart, Paris (1914) : IV. Cortège - V. Andantino - VI. Rapsodie sur des Noëls connus.
- 15 Pièces pour Harmonium ou Orgue sur des Thèmes liturgiques, L.-J. Biton, St-Laurent-sur-Sèvre (Vendée), 1919.
- Suite héroïque in the 2nd issue of the series Les Voix de la douleur chrétienne published by abbott Joubert by A. Ledent-Malay in Brussel (1924).

=== Vocal music ===
- Motets :
  - À la Sainte Croix (4 mixed or 3 equal voices and organ)
  - Ave Verum Corpus (4 mixed voices)
  - Choral final: Chantons Jésus (4 mixed or 3 equal voices)
  - Mystères Glorieux (soloist and 4 mixed or 3 equal voices and organ
  - Isti Sunt Agni Novelli (4 mixed voices).
  - Quae es ista (duet and choir with two equal voices) - 1903
- Messe de Noël sur des thèmes anciens (4 mixed voices and organ)
- Messe en l’honneur de Saint Louis (4 mixed/unison or 4 equal voices with accompaniment)
- Messe Royale du 1° Ton de Henry Du Mont (4 mixed voices).
- Cantate à Sainte Louise de Marillac (singing and organ)
- La Cathédrale Incendiée (4 mixed voices, and organ) lyrics by Henri Ghéon.

== Sources ==
- Association Jehan Alain L'orgue de la famille Alain.
- Entretemps Photos d'Albert Alain à son orgue.
- Interview by Gilles Cantagrel with Aurélie Decourt, historian, Doctor in musicology at Paris Sorbonne, daughter of the organist Marie-Claire Alain and niece of the composer Jehan Alain (January 2011).
- (in English) Pipedreams Alain on Alain

== Bibliography ==
- Aurélie Decourt. Un musicien dans la ville. Albert Alain et Saint-Germain-en-Laye (1880-1971), éditions du Valhermeil, 2001.
- Aurélie Decourt. Une famille de musiciens au XXe siècle: La famille Alain (Paris, Hermann, 2011)
- Aurélie Decourt. 'Jehan Alain: His Life and Works', The Diapason (2011)

== Discography ==
- Albert Alain par Marie-Claire Alain au grand orgue Cavaillé-Coll/Haerpfer et orgue de chœur Cavaillé-Coll de Saint-Germain-en-Laye, Calliope (2007) : Finale op. 429 - Andantino op. 346 - Aria op. 425 - Scherzo op. 423 - Élégie op. 396 - Andantino op. 437 - Toccatina op. 373 - Pas trop lent op. 345 - Assez lent op. 357 - Andantino con moto op. 347 - Berceuse op. 395 - Carillon sur « Lauda Sion » op. 424 - Carillon de Bougival op. 368 - Au temps de Noël op. 360 - Prière op. 427 - Andante op. 306 - Finale sur « Cantemus Domino » op. 323.
- Albert Alain Complete discography by Alain Cartayrade on France Orgue.
