= Jean-Paul Imbert =

French organist and teacher (1942–2025)

- Born: 9 July 1942; Clermont-Ferrand, France
- Died: 8 September 2025 (aged 83)
- Occupations: Organist; Teacher

Jean-Paul Imbert (French: [ʒɑ̃ pɔl ɛ̃bɛʁ]; 19 July 1942 – 8 September 2025) was a French organist and teacher.

After studying in Paris under the tutelage of Pierre Cochereau and Jean Guillou, he was an organist for the Saint-Vincent-de-Paul church. He taught at the Schola Cantorum de Paris.

Imbert died in a drowning accident on 8 September 2025, at the age of 83.
