= Hôtel de Ville, Saint-Germain-en-Laye =

Town hall in Saint-Germain-en-Laye, France

Hôtel de Ville
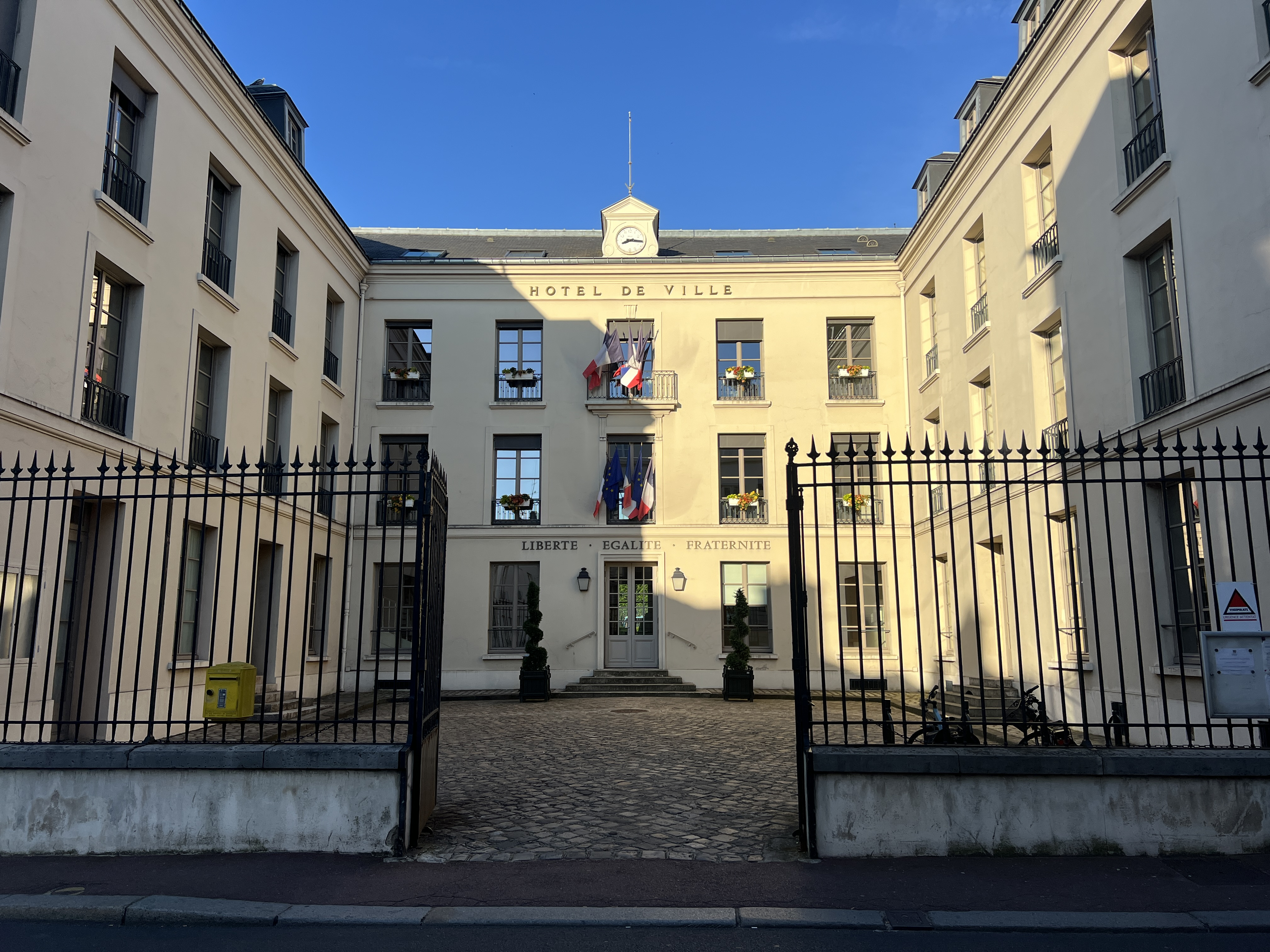
- The main frontage of the Hôtel de Ville in June 2024
- Interactive map of the Hôtel de Ville area

General information
- Type: City hall
- Architectural style: Neoclassical style
- Location: Saint-Germain-en-Laye, France
- Coordinates: 48.8989°N 2.0938°E
- Completed: c.1778

Design and construction
- Architect: Henri Choret

The Hôtel de Ville (French pronunciation: [otɛl də vil], City Hall) is a municipal building in Saint-Germain-en-Laye, Yvelines, in the western suburbs of Paris, standing on Rue de Pontoise.

== History ==
The building was commissioned as a private house in the second half of the 16th century. It was acquired by François de La Rochefoucauld, 1st Duke of La Rochefoucauld in 1604, and then became the home of the writer, François de La Rochefoucauld, 2nd Duke of La Rochefoucauld in 1650.

It then passed down the family line to Louis Alexandre de La Rochefoucauld, 6th Duke of La Rochefoucauld in 1762. After the 6th Duke lost interest in the property, it was sold to a royal courtier, Jean-Jacques d'Audibert de Corbière, in 1763. His son, a cavalry officer, Pierre Laurent d'Audibert de Corbière, sold it to a bookseller, Charles-Antoine Jombert, in 1777. In the 18th century, the house consisted of a main block facing south, a stable block and a courtyard behind. However, shortly after acquiring the building, Jombert remodelled it to create a typical Hôtel particulier with a courtyard in front, opening out onto Rue de Pontoise, and a garden behind.

The house was acquired by another nobleman, Anne-Nicolas Doublet, Marquis de Persan, in 1786 and it then passed through several more owners before being bought by the town council in 1842. The council had previously been accommodated at the Hôtel de la Chancellerie on Rue de Pontoise, but that building had become dilapidated and had to be demolished. The council later commissioned work to convert the Hôtel de La Rochefoucauld for municipal use to a design by Jean-Baptiste Lesueur.

During the Franco-Prussian War, on 19 September 1870, a Prussian infantry unit arrived at the town hall and demanded a war indemnity of FFr 100,000, to compensate for damages and expenses incurred, failing which the unit said they would burn the town. The next day, four Prussian dragoons approached the town hall and said that they had come to verify that the French troops had abandoned the town.

Modifications to the façade were carried out to a design by Henri Choret and completed in 1897. Meanwhile, internal decoration of the Salle des Mariages (wedding room) was undertaken by the painter, Louis Hista.

During the Second World War, the Henry IV Pavilion on Rue Thiers served as the headquarters of General Gerd von Rundstedt, commander of Oberbefehlshaber West, which directed all German forces on the Western Front. The town hall primarily served as the command post for local defences to protect the population from allied air attacks. However, a requisitions office was established on the second floor of the town hall, where officials provided administrative support to Rundstedt's staff. The building was comprehensively refurbished in 1997.
