= Georges Guillard =

French organist

- Born: 19 May 1939 (age 87); France
- Occupation: Organist

Georges Guillard (born 19 May 1939) is a French organist, former holder of the Great Organ of the Notre-Dame-des-Blancs-Manteaux church in Paris.

== Life ==
Born in Saint-Just-la-Pendue, Guillard was for a long time the holder of the Grandes Orgues de Notre-Dame-des-Blancs-Manteaux and the Église Saint-Louis-en-l'Île in Paris. Founder and former head of the Department of early music at the Conservatoire à rayonnement régional de Paris, he is also a doctor of musicology: his thesis, defended in 1993 under the supervision of Danièle Pistone, is entitled L'orgue à Paris de 1964 à 1986.

He is a regular guest at Radio France and the main festivals of the capital (Festival Estival, Festival d'Art Sacré), and has also given numerous concerts in the provinces and in Europe. He has also been executive producer at Radio France (France Musique) for organ cycles. In 2002, he launched a complete set of Bach' Cantatas in the Notre-Dame-des-Blancs-Manteaux church, which was a great public success, is to last for more than twenty years and is now continuing to be performed in L'Oratoire du Louvre (1st arrondissement of Paris)

A long practice of the Kern organ of the Blancs-Manteaux, contacts with organ builders (in particular, Jürgen Ahrend, for an aborted project relative to St-Louis-en-l'Ile) and interpreters led him to take a particular interest in the European baroque and classical repertoires.

His research has taken the form of musical publications (works by G. A. Homilius, facsimile of J. S. Bach's The Art of Fugue), musicological (numerous articles), musicographic (J. S. Bach and the Organ, series. Que sais-je?) or educational (Manuel pratique d’Analyse).

His discography includes several world premieres: in particular the organ work of Gottfried August Homilius, the first so-called "Weimar version" of J. S. Bach's Leipzig choirs, as well as the entire vocal and instrumental work of Jehan Alain on three CDs. These records have twice been awarded a Golden Orpheus from the Académie du disque lyrique (in 1992 and 1996).

His interest in contemporary repertoire has also led him to premiere important authors in France: Giacinto Scelsi, Pierre-Yves Level, Olivier Alain, Philippe Schœller, Michèle Reverdy, Jacques Castérède and Bernard Foccroulle.

== Discography ==
- Jehan Alain, Œuvres vocales et instrumentales (vol.1) – CD ARION Orphée d'or 1992.
- Jehan Alain, Œuvres vocales et instrumentales (vol.2) – CD ARION Orphée d'or,1996
- Jehan Alain, Œuvres vocales et instrumentales (vol.3) – CD ARION
- Hans Leo Hassler, Organ pieces and polyphonic songs – CD Solciste
- Gaillac, l'orgue des Cavaillé with Delphine Collot– CD REM
- Gottfried-August Homilius, Organ works (world premiere) – CD ARION
- Élisabeth Jacquet de La Guerre, Cantates bibliques et œuvres instrumentales, 2 CD ARION
- Élisabeth Jacquet de La Guerre, Pièces pour clavier transcrites à l'orgue (world first. Orgue de la cathédrale d'Auch) - CD Jean-François Production JFP 2013

== Bibliography ==
- J.S. Bach et l'orgue ISBN 978-2-87750-092-0
- Manuel pratique d'analyse auditive, Éditions Transatlantiques

== Publishing of musical works ==
- Gottfried August Homilius, Huit chorals, Paris, Ed. Musicales Transatlantiques, 1981, 22 p.
- Johann Sebastian Bach, Trio en sol mineur BWV 584, Paris, Ed. musicales Transatlantiques, 1978, 4 p.
- Johann Sebastian Bach, Choral Wo gehest du hin, extract of Cantata BWV 166 (transcription: GG), Paris, Ed. musicales Transatlantiques, 1981, 4 p.
- Johann Sebastian Bach, Choral Du Friedefürst, extract from Cantata BWV 143, (transcription: GG), Paris, Ed. musicales Transatlantiques, 1981, 2 pages.
- Johann Sebastian Bach, Fantasia con fuga, BWV 904 (revision and original adaptation for organ by GG), Paris, Ed. musicales Transatlantiques, 1981, 10 p.
- Johann Sebastian Bach, Prélude, Fugue et Allegro, BWV 998 (transcription, adaptation and fingering by GG), Ed. Delatour, 2002
- Johann Sebastian Bach, The Art of Fugue, facsimile of the copy made in 1833 by Alexandre Pierre François Boëly, ed. A.Zurfluh, 1985 1st modern edition)
- Bohuslav Matěj Černohorský, Fugue en la mineur (organ edition by Guillard), Ed. Delatour, 2002,
- Élisabeth Jacquet de La Guerre, 1er Livre d' Orgue [3 Suites from the Harpsichord Books], adapted to the organ by Georges Guillard, Ed. Delatour, 2002
- Johann Christoph Altnickol, Sonata per il cembalo solo [Allegro, Largo, Vivace], edition restored and annotated by Guillard, Ed. Delatour, 2002
- Johann Christoph Altnickol, Notenbüchlein [collection of 7 very short and easy pieces for beginners], Ed. Delatour, 2002
- Gottfried August Homilius, Motetto à trois chœurs a cappella (1st worldwide edition), Ed. Delatour, 2002

Musicological and pedagogical works

- Jean Sébastien BACH et l'Orgue, Paris, P.U.F., series Que sais-Je ?, 1987, 128 pages, out of print (8000 copies). 2nd ed. at A.Zurfluh, 2000. (translated into Swedish)
- Manuel Pratique d'Analyse auditive, Paris, Ed. Musicales Transatlantiques, 1982, 131 pages, (3rd edition - avec un CD incorporé)
- Robert Schumann, Album d’Orgue pour la Jeunesse, Pieces taken from Opus 68 and adapted for the organ in the form of a progressive method, Volume 1, Musical Editions of the Schola Cantorum, Fleurier, January 2013.

== Participation to collective publications ==
- Glenn Gould Pluriel, Québec, Louise Courteau, 1988, 278 p. Chapter about Glenn Gould, paradoxal organist.
- Guide de la Musique d'Orgue, under the direction of Gilles Cantagrel, Paris, Fayard, 1991, 840 pages, 2nd edition, 2013. Guillard wrote numerous articles on German Baroque music (J. S. Bach's predecessors) and contemporary music, in particular Jehan Alain, Petr Eben, Bernard Foccroulle, Guy Bovet and Giacinto Scelsi.
- Jehan Alain, Livre du Centenaire, under the direction of Aurélie Decourt, Les Presses Franciliennes, 2012. Article « L’orchestre « caché » de Jehan Alain ». Esquisse d’une réflexion sur J. Alain « orchestrateur », ou l’intuition d’un J. Alain orchestrateur-né.(8 pages)
