= Pierre Appell =

French politician

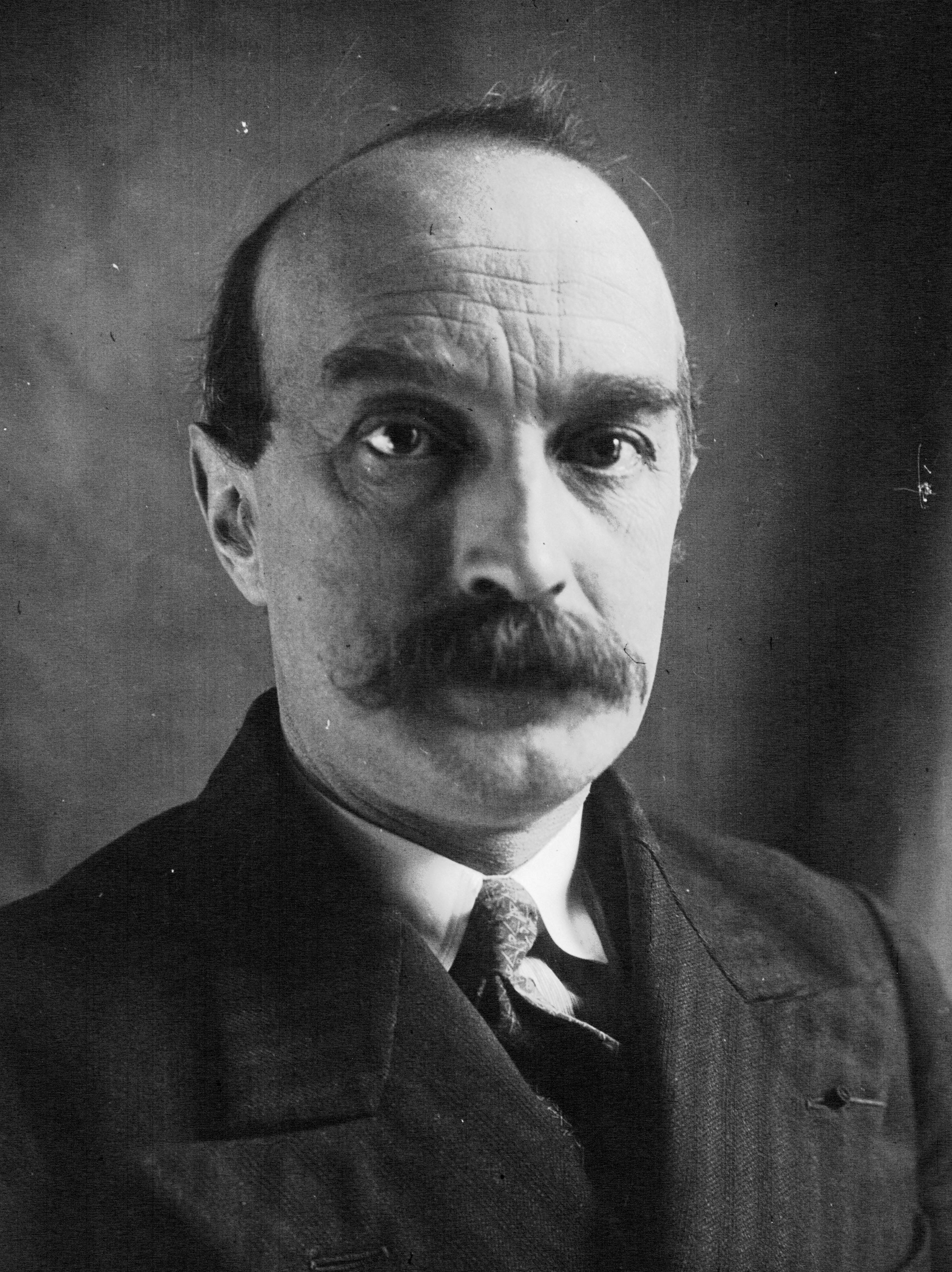
Pierre Appell

Pierre Hubert Alexandre Henri Appell (3 July 1887 - 19 December 1957) was a French politician.

Appell was born in Saint-Germain-en-Laye. Prior to the First World War, he was a serving naval officer. He was promoted to lieutenant in July 1917, and was second in command of the submarine Monge.

He represented the Republican-Socialist Party in the Chamber of Deputies from 1928 to 1936.
