= Zsuzsa Elekes =

Hungarian organist (born 1955)

Zsuzsa Elekes (born 1955) is a Hungarian organist and organ teacher at the Béla Bartók Conservatory in Budapest.

== Education ==
Zsuzsa Elekes was born in 1955 in Budapest. She studied at the Béla Bartók Conservatory in her hometown Budapest, where her teachers included Lajos Kertész and Gábor Lehotka. She continued her studies at the Franz Liszt Academy of Music as a pupil of Ferenc Gergely, Lajos Sztankay, and János Sebestyén, graduating cum laude in 1978. She undertook further study with Hannes Kästner in Leipzig for two years, and participated in masterclasses with Marie-Claire Alain, Jean Guillou, Johannes-Ernst Köhler, Michael Radulescu, Michael Schneider and Luigi Tagliavini.

== Musical career ==
Zsuzsa Elekes has won a number of prizes. She has made many LP, radio and CD recordings and undertaken concert tours in Germany, the Czech Republic, the United Kingdom, France, Italy, Austria, Poland, Romania, the Netherlands, Denmark, and Japan. From 1980 to 1994, Zsuzsa Elekes was soloist of the Hungarian National Philharmonic. Since 1980, she has taught at the Béla Bartók Conservatory in Budapest. She is also frequently invited to sit on the juries of international competitions.

== Awards ==
- 1975: 1st prize at the competition to celebrate the 100th birthday of the Franz Liszt Academy of Music, Budapest
- 1975: Artisjus Prize, Budapest
- 1978: 2nd prize at the 1st International Franz Liszt Organ Competition, Budapest
- 1979: 2nd prize at the Prague Spring International Music Competition, Prague
- 1980: 1st prize (the Bach Prize) at the International Johann Sebastian Bach Competition, Leipzig
- 1986: Franz Liszt Memorial Award, Budapest
- 1988: Prize of the Cziffra Foundation, Budapest
- 1992: Artisjus Prize, Budapest
- 1993: Artisjus Prize, Budapest
- 1994: Franz Liszt Prize of the Hungarian Ministry of Culture
- 1995: Grand Prix International du Disque (for her Liszt performances)
