= Frédéric Vieillot =

French footballer (born 1990)

Personal information
- Date of birth: 7 September 1990 (age 36)
- Place of birth: Saint-Germain-en-Laye, France
- Height: 1.76 m (5 ft 9 in)
- Position: Striker

Senior career*
Years	Team	Apps	(Gls)
2008–2011	Troyes	21	(4)
2011	→ Beauvais (loan)	13	(2)
- * Club domestic league appearances and goals as of 13:54, 18 June 2012 (UTC)

Frédéric Vieillot (born 7 September 1990) is a French football striker who is currently a free agent after being released by Troyes in 2011. During the 2010–11 season, he had a loan spell with Championnat National side Beauvais.
