= Leonid Karev =

Russian musician (born 1969)

Leonid Karev is a composer, organist and pianist, born in Moscow in 1969. He has lived in France since 1992, and is a professor of organ and piano accompaniment at the Conservatories of Paris and Yerres (France) and organist at the Notre-Dame-de-l'Assomption church in Paris and the Bertrand Cattiaux's organ in the Saint-Médard church in Brunoy (France).

He studied at the Moscow Tchaikovsky Conservatory and at Conservatoire de Paris both as composer and organist. His professors included Michel Chapuis, André Isoir, Jean Guillou, Alain Banquart, Michel Merlet, and Guillaume Connesson. He graduated from the École Normale de Musique de Paris as a composer. His symphony Dulce Memoriae was awarded the Sacem prize and a prize at the Gino Contilli competition in Italy and his piece for choir Ave Maria was awarded at the Guido d'Arezzo competition in Italy. He is also the First Prize winner of Marcel Dupré organ Competition in Chartres (1998), and the First Prize of honor winner of the UFAM in Paris (1996).

In his music Karev has continued the Russian tradition, adapting it to contemporary compositional ideas. He has given many organ concerts in Russia, France, Italy, USA and other countries. His compositions have been performed at Moscow Autumn Festival (2001, 2004, 2006), Saint-Eustache organ festivals in Paris (1994, 2003, 2007), Russian Contemporary Music Festival in Iowa (2000) and many other music events.
