= Marie-Claire Alain =

French organist (1926–2013)

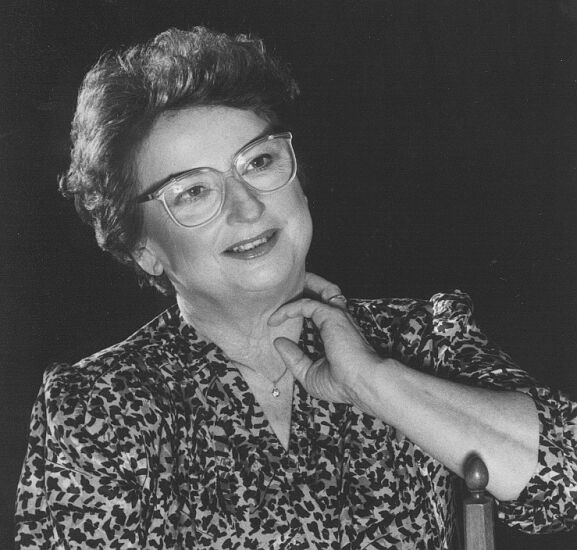
- Born: Marie-Claire Geneviève Alain; 10 August 1926; Saint-Germain-en-Laye, Yvelines, Île-de-France, France
- Died: 26 February 2013 (aged 86); Le Pecq, France
- Other names: Marie-Claire Alain-Gommier
- Occupations: Organist; Organ scholar; Organ teacher
- Awards: Léonie Sonning Music Prize; Légion d'honneur

Marie-Claire Geneviève Alain-Gommier (10 August 1926 – 26 February 2013) was a French organist, scholar and teacher best known for her prolific recording career, with 260 recordings, making her the most-recorded classical organist in the world. She taught many of the world's prominent organists. She was a specialist in Bach, making three recordings of his complete organ works, as well as French organ music.

She was the sister of the famous organist-composers Jehan Alain and Olivier Alain and was the daughter of amateur organbuilder Albert Alain.

Alain was commonly deemed one of the most illustrious organists of her generation, and bore an international reputation. Critics were unanimous in praising the clarity of her playing, the purity of her style, the intense and lively musicality of her interpretations and her fluency in the art of organ registration.

== Background and education ==
Marie-Claire Geneviève Alain, the youngest of the four Alain children, was born in Saint-Germain-en-Laye on 10 August 1926. Her father Albert Alain (1880–1971) was an organist and composer, as were her brothers Jehan (1911–1940) and Olivier (1918–1994). Her mother was Magdeleine-Claire Alberty (born 1890).

At the age of 11 she began assisting her father when he played organ in the parish church of Saint-Germain-en-Laye. She studied at the Conservatoire de Paris in the organ class of Marcel Dupré, where she was awarded four first prizes. She also studied harmony there with Maurice Duruflé.

After her father's death in 1971, she succeeded him as organist of the parish church of Saint-Germain-en-Laye until her retirement in 2011.

== Career ==
Alain won the 2nd prize for organ at the Geneva International Music Competition in 1950.

She taught at the conservatory of Rueil-Malmaison and the Paris Conservatory. Her pupils included George C. Baker, Diane Bish, Guy Bovet, James David Christie, Monique Gendron, Gerre Hancock, Edward Higginbottom, Marcus Huxley, Gunnar Idenstam, Wolfgang Karius, Jon Laukvik, Michael Matthes, Domenico Morgante, Daniel Roth, Wolfgang Rübsam, David Sanger, Helga Schauerte, Dong-ill Shin, de:Martin Strohhäcker, Marina Tchebourkina, Thomas Trotter, Fritz Werner and the Hungarian Zsuzsa Elekes. Upon her death, the list of her students was described as a "who's who of the present-day organ world".

She was the most-recorded classical organist in the world, with over 260 recordings in her catalogue. Alain recorded the complete organ works of J.S. Bach three times as well as the complete organ works of over a dozen other major composers of works for the organ, as well as many individual works. She was devoted to the organ works of her brother Jehan, who died before she began her conservatory studies. A recording of works for organ and trumpet with Maurice André was among her most popular. When her third recording of Bach's works for organ appeared in 1994, she explained to The Organ, a British journal, why she was recording them again:

It's because of the instruments, the instruments above everything else, and the fine state to which they have been restored—and the fact that they are now accessible. These recordings use instruments from Bach's time, and we know that Bach even played some of them—it's an extraordinary feeling, to put your hands on the keyboard, knowing that he was there 250 years before you!

Alain had a long association with the St Albans International Organ Festival. She edited compositions by her brother Jehan for publication, including Chanson à bouche fermée.

She married Jacques Charles Gommier (born 1925) on 17 June 1950; until his death in 1992 in Villeneuve-Saint-Georges. Their son Benoît died in 2009. Alain died on 26 February 2013 in a nursing home in Le Pecq, a suburb of Paris, survived by their daughter Aurélie.

== Awards ==
- Léonie Sonning Music Prize (1980; Denmark)
- Grand Officer of the Legion of Honour (2010; France)
