= Yevgeni Karev =

Russian footballer

Personal information
- Full name: Yevgeni Viktorovich Karev
- Date of birth: 19 April 1985 (age 41)
- Height: 1.71 m (5 ft 7 1/2 in)
- Position: Defender

Youth career
- Chertanovo Education Center

Senior career*
Years	Team	Apps	(Gls)
2002–2003	FC Khimki	0	(0)
2004	FC Shinnik Yaroslavl	0	(0)
2005	FC Spartak Chelyabinsk	7	(0)
2006–2007	FC Chernomorets Novorossiysk	22	(1)
2007–2008	FC Spartak-UGP Anapa	38	(1)
- * Club domestic league appearances and goals

Yevgeni Viktorovich Karev (Russian: Евгений Викторович Карев; born 19 April 1985) is a former Russian professional footballer.

== Club career ==
He made his debut for FC Shinnik Yaroslavl on 3 July 2004 in an Intertoto Cup game against FK Teplice. He made two more appearances in that Intertoto Cup. He also appeared for Shinnik on 31 July 2004 in a Russian Cup game against FC SKA-Energiya Khabarovsk.

He played in the Russian Football National League for FC Spartak Chelyabinsk in 2005.
