= Olivier Alain =

French organist, pianist, musicologist and composer (1918 - 1994)

Olivier Georges Alain (3 August 1918 – 28 February 1994) was a French organist, pianist, musicologist and composer.

== Life ==
Alain was born in Saint-Germain-en-Laye, near Paris, into a musical family. His father, Albert Alain (1880–1971) was an organist and composer, as was his elder brother Jehan Alain (1911–1940), and his younger sister, Marie-Claire (1926–2013), was herself a noted organist. He studied at the Paris Conservatory, where he received first prizes in composition (1951, class of Tony Aubin) and musical analysis (1950, class of Olivier Messiaen).

In 1950, he became director of the conservatory in Saint-Germain-en-Laye, where he worked until 1964. From 1960 to 1974, he served as director of the École César Franck in Paris, and in 1976 founded the Conservatoire National de Région in Paris, whose director he was until 1985, and where he taught classes in musical analysis and chamber music. His notable students include composers Alain Gagnon.

Alain's catalog of musical compositions contains almost 170 compositions of various genres, most of which are still unpublished. He also published a book on harmony (Paris, 1965) and a monograph on Johann Sebastian Bach (Paris, 1970). His comprehensive chronology and analysis of the life and complete works of J. S. Bach is still unpublished. His discovery of the 14 Canons on the first 8 fundamental notes of the aria from the Goldberg Variations (BWV 1087) in Strasbourg in 1974 is often regarded as one of the greatest Bach-source finds of the 20th century.

He died in 1994 in Férolles-Attilly.

== Compositions ==
=== Organ solo ===
- Chanson de la brume en mer op. 64 (1940. Ligugé: Éditions Europart)
- Suite op. 135 (1951. Paris: Leduc)
- Lacrymae op. 150 (1957. Paris: Éditions Schola Cantorum)
- Prélude: Introït-Récitatif pour le 2e Dimanche après l'Épiphanie op. 158 (1959: Paris: Éditions Schola Cantorum)
- Offertoire-Fantaisie op. 160 (1961: Paris: Éditions Schola Cantorum)
- Récit pour l'Élévation op. 161 (1962: Paris: Éditions Schola Cantorum)
- Microludes op. 166 (1981. Ligugé: Éditions Europart)

=== Chamber music ===
- Dithyrambe op. 18 for Oboe and Piano or Trumpet, Flute and Organ (1936. Sampzon: Éditions Delatour France)
- Sicilienne op. 24 for Piano, Flute and Organ (1937. Sampzon: Éditions Delatour France)
- Divertissement (nocturne) op. 73 for Flute and Piano or Organ (1942. Sampzon: Éditions Delatour France)
- Ritournelle op. 74 for Oboe and Piano or Flute, Violin and Organ (1943. Sampzon: Éditions Delatour France)
- Suite op. 98 for Violin and Piano (1945–47. Sampzon: Éditions Delatour France)
- String Quartet op. 123 (1949. Sampzon: Éditions Delatour France)
- Aventure op. 144 for Flute and Organ (1953. Paris: Salabert)
- Suite française: Suite pour Rameau op. 163 for Trumpet and Organ or Flute and Organ (1964. Sampzon: Éditions Delatour France)
- Ballade op. 163b for Piano and Organ (1948. Sampzon: Éditions Delatour France)
- Songe ou Souvenances (Mneïa) op. 164 for Oboe and Organ or Flute and Organ (1973. Sampzon: Éditions Delatour France)
- Threnos (Deuils) op. 167 for Piano and Organ (1982. Sampzon: Édition Delatour France)
- 12 more unpublished chamber music works

=== Choral works ===
- Lucis Creator optimae op. 55 for Choir and Organ (1939. Sampzon: Éditions Delatour France)
- Petrus quidem op. 76 for Choir a capella (1943. Sampzon: Éditions Delatour France)
- Jesu, dulcis amor meus op. 77 for Choir, Soloists and Organ (1943. Sampzon: Éditions Delatour France)
- Noël: Allons, ma voisine op. 78 for Choir a capella (1943. Sampzon: Éditions Delatour France)
- Cibavit eos op. 88 for Choir a capella (1944. Sampzon: Éditions Delatour France)
- 3 Repons du Vendredi Saint op. 136-138 for Choir a capella (1951. Sampzon: Éditions Delatour France)
- 3 Repons du Jeudi Saint op. 139-141 for Choir a capella (1952. Sampzon: Éditions Delatour France)
- 3 Déplorations: Repons du Samedi Saint op. 145-147 for voice and keyboard (1954. Sampzon: Éditions Delatour France)
- 15 more unpublished choral compositions

=== Piano solo ===
- Intermezzo op. 162 (1964. Paris: Éditions Choudens)
- 47 more unpublished piano compositions

=== Two pianos ===
- Première Ballade op. 69 in E minor (1942, unpublished)
- Deuxième Ballade op. 75 in A-flat major (1943, unpublished)
- 4 Danses op. 112 (1948, unpublished)
- 5 Pièces op. 112a (1948, unpublished)

=== Voice and piano ===
- Stances du Banquet (Sponde) op. 79 (1944. Sampzon: Éditions Delatour France)
- 41 more unpublished works for voice and piano

=== Miscellaneous works ===
- Tristan op. 89. Ballet music in twelve scenes (1945, unpublished)
- La Samaritaine op. 90. Stage Music in five scenes for Oboe, Harp and Strings (1945, unpublished)
- Symphonie Argentière op. 124 for orchestra (1949, unpublished)
- Chant funèbre pour les morts en montagne op. 133. Oratorio in twelve scenes for soloists, choir and orchestra (1950, unpublished)
- L'Athlète aux mains nues op. 134. Music for a film by Daniel Rops (1950, unpublished)
- Henri IV op. 142. Film music (1952, unpublished)
- Fantaisies pour le CNR Nos. 1 et 2 op. 165 for various instruments (1977. Sampzon: Édition Delatour France)
- Odoï op. 168 for orchestra (1983, unpublished)

== Bibliography ==
- Alain, Marie-Claire (2008): "Hommage à Olivier Alain." In Association Maurice & Marie-Madeleine Duruflé: Bulletin Nos. 7-8 (2007–2008): 99–101.
- Alain, Olivier (1951): "L'œuvre pour piano de Jehan Alain." In Le Conservatoire 14 (January 1951): 59–62.
- Alain, Olivier (1951): "Le Requiem de Maurice Duruflé." In Le Conservatoire 14 (January 1951): 62–64.
- Alain, Olivier (1956): "Maurice Duruflé, Grand Prix de la Ville de Paris." In Le Figaro, 1124 (December 1956).
- Decourt, Aurélie (2008): "Olivier Alain: Un artiste déchiré entre ses passions." In Association Maurice & Marie-Madeleine Duruflé: Bulletin Nos. 7-8 (2007–2008): 106–111.
- Guillard, Georges (2008): "Olivier Alain: Passeur et accoucheur de musiciens." In Association Maurice & Marie-Madeleine Duruflé: Bulletin Nos. 7-8 (2007–2008): 102–105.
