= Dong-ill Shin =

Dong-Ill Shin won first prize in the national competition for piano sponsored by The Korea Times at the age of ten. When he was eleven he made his debut with the Pusan Philharmonic Orchestra playing Mozart's Concerto in d minor No. 20. Attracted by J.S. Bach's Music and the orchestra-like colors produced by the organ, he began his studies with Dr. Sun-woo Cho at the age of 14. Later at Yonsei University in Seoul he studied with Dr. Tong-soon Kwak and completed his Bachelor of Music degree in 1997. He then studied in France with Jean Boyer and received the Diplome Nationale Superieur de Musique from the Conservatoire Nationale Superieur de Musique de Lyon in Organ, Harmony, Fugue, Analysis, Improvisation & Basso-Continuo. His dissertation at the Conservatoire was on the study of Tabulatura Nava by Samuel Scheidt which focused on J.P. Sweelinck's influences. His studies continued with Olivier Latry and Michel Bouvard at the Conservatoire Nationale Superieur de Musique de Paris in the prestigious Cycle de Perfectionnement program, which is the highest program in the French National Conservatory system. He also undertook private studies with Mme. Marie-Claire Alain for Organ and Mme. Françoise Marmim for Harpsichord. During his years of study in France he won several scholarships including awards from the Darazzi Foundation, the Meyer Foundation and Mécèn de Société Générale. In 2004 he completed his Artist Diploma at The Boston Conservatory on a full scholarship studying with James David Christie.

== Major prizes and awards ==
Shin is a prize winner of several international Competitions such as:

- Musashino-Tokyo International Organ Competition in 1996
- Ciurlionis International Piano and Organ Competition, Lithuania
- The 51st Prague Spring International Music Festival and Competition in 1999
- The 21st St. Albans International Organ Competition, Great Britain in 2001
- The 20th Grand Prix de Chartres International Organ Competition in 2006

== Notable performances and recitals ==
He has been a featured artist on KBS Radio in Korea, NHK Satellite Television in Japan, France Musique, Radio France & MEZZO Television in France, Lithuanian National Television, Hungarian National Radio, Spanish National Radio, Bayerischer Rundfunk radio, Radio Luxembourg and WCRB, UPR, KBYU and Pipedream in USA. He has given numerous concerts in France, Germany, Great Britain, Italy, Spain, Lithuania, Norway, the Czech Republic, Monaco, Luxembourg, Swiss, Netherlands, USA and in the Far East at such prestigious venues as Cité de la Musique, Notre Dame de Paris, La Madelein, Cathedral de Chartres and Musashino Bunkakaikan, Japan, Victoria Concert Hall, Singapore, Torch Center, Seoul, Methuen Music Hall, Washington National Cathedral, St. Patrick's Cathedral, New York City and music festivals such as Festival d’orgue a Rennes, Festival a St. Etienne du Mont, Paris, Monaco International Organ Festival, Chartres International Organ Festival, St. Albans International Festival, Nuremberg International Festival, Festival du Comminges, International Festival in Ravenna, Estivale d’ete a Carcassone.

== Positions ==
Shin was Associate Organist at Marsh Chapel, Boston University and Interim Director of Music at Jesuit Urban Center, Boston, which is home to the historic 1863 Hook and Hastings Organ. He was then appointed as Organist/Artist-in-Residence at First United Methodist Church of Hurst, Texas (with an Allen organ), and adjunct professor of Organ at Texas Wesleyan University. His most recent appointment was as assistant professor of Organ at Yonsei University, Seoul, Korea.
