= St. Matthias, Berlin =

Roman Catholic church in Berlin, Germany

Coordinates: 52°29′43″N 13°21′16″E

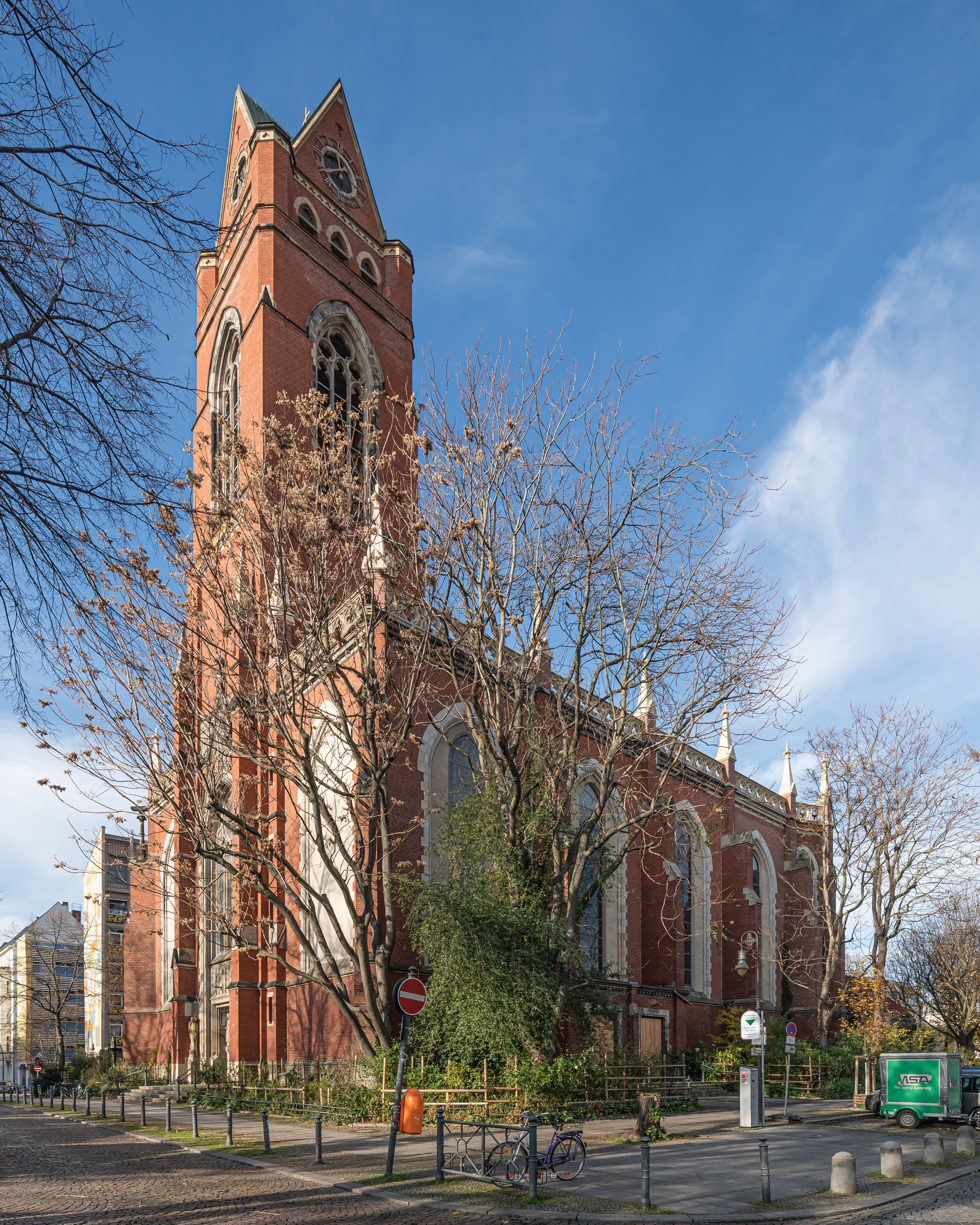
Exterior view

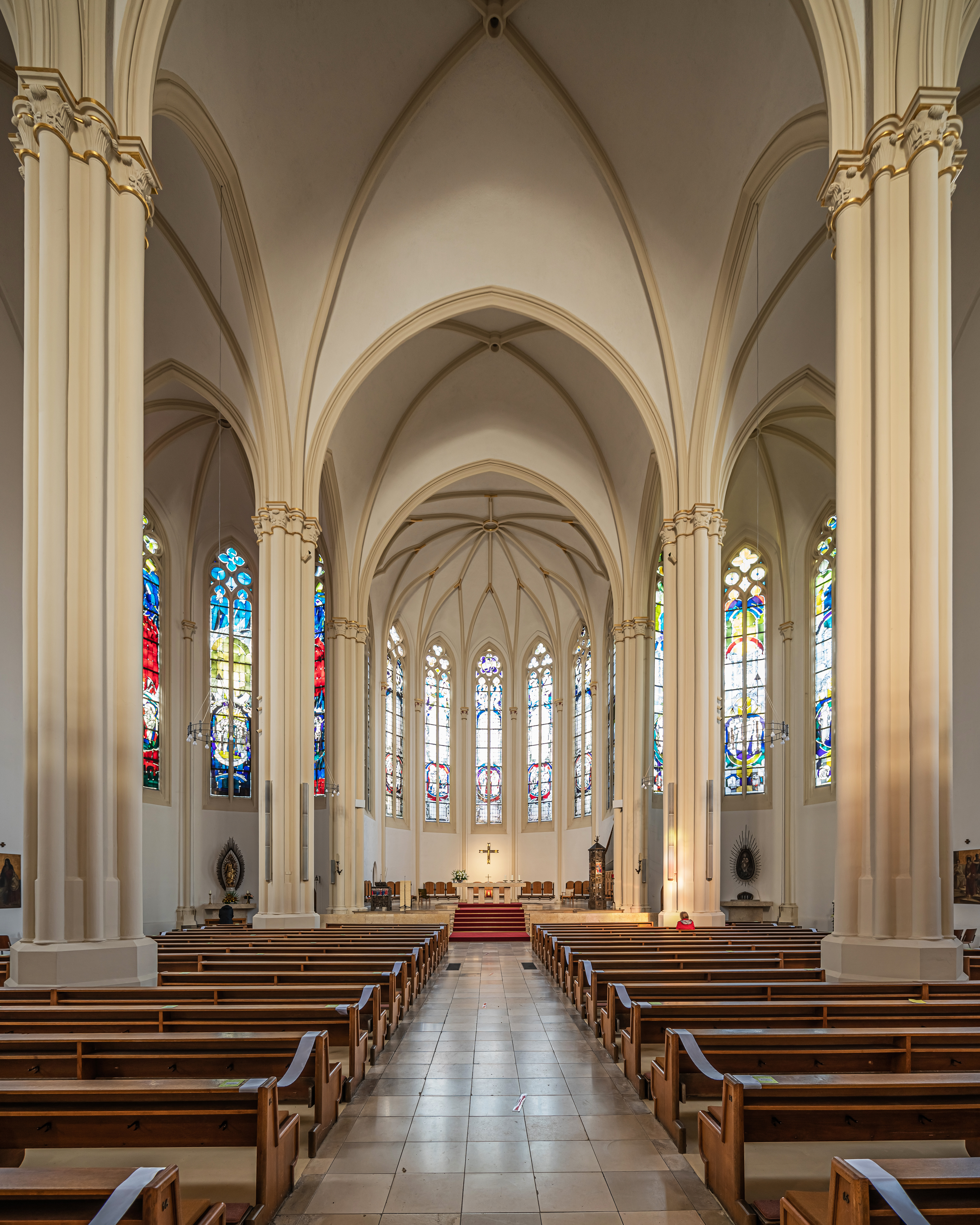
Interior view

St. Matthias is a Roman Catholic church in Berlin, serving a parish just in front of the Potsdam Gate.

The parish's first church was built in 1867–1868 using a 20,000 thaler donation from Prussian civil servant Matthias Aulike (his stipulation that it be served by a priest from his home diocese of Munster is still met today), making it the third oldest Roman Catholic parish in the city after those of St. Hedwig and St. Sebastian. It rose from an initial 800 parishioners to 10,000 by around 1890 and an expansion to the first church proved inadequate.

A competition was therefore held to design a new church, with entries from August Menken among others. It was won by Engelbert Seibertz, with its foundation stone laid on 23 October 1893 by the parish priest and the consecration on 24 October 1895 led by Georg von Kopp, cardinal and bishop of Breslau. That new church was a hall church and still stands today on Winterfeldtplatz in the Schöneberg district.
