= Jehan Alain =

French organist, composer and soldier

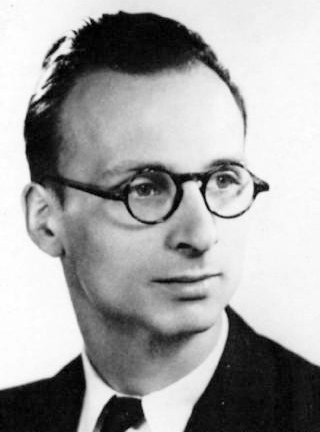
- Alain in 1938
- Born: Jehan-Ariste Paul Alain; 3 February 1911; Saint-Germain-en-Laye, France
- Died: 20 June 1940 (aged 29); Saumur, France
- Cause of death: Killed in action
- Other name: Jehan-Aristide Paul Alain
- Occupations: Organist, composer, and soldier

Jehan-Ariste Paul Alain (Note: His birth certificate has the first middle name of "Ariste", his death report (from the Second World War) and other records have the first middle name of "Aristide".) ([ʒɑn aʁist alɛ̃]; 3 February 1911 – 20 June 1940) was a French organist, composer and soldier. Born into a family of musicians, he learned the organ from his father and a host of other teachers, becoming a composer at 18, and composing until the outbreak of the Second World War 10 years later. His compositional style was influenced by the musical language of the earlier Claude Debussy, as well as his interest in music, dance and philosophy of the far east. At the outbreak of the Second World War, Alain became a dispatch rider in the Eighth Motorised Armour Division of the French Army; he took part in the Battle of Saumur, in which he was killed.

His younger brother was the composer, performer and musicologist Olivier Alain and his younger sister was the organist Marie-Claire Alain; the two were responsible for popularising his works.

== Biography ==
Alain was born in Saint-Germain-en-Laye in the western suburbs of Paris, into a family of musicians. His father, Albert Alain (1880–1971) was an organist, composer and amateur organ builder who had studied with Alexandre Guilmant and Louis Vierne. His younger brother was the composer, organist and pianist Olivier Alain (1918–1994), and his youngest sister the organist Marie-Claire Alain (1926–2013). Jehan received his initial training in the piano from Augustin Pierson, the organist of Saint-Louis at Versailles, and in the organ from his father, who had built a four-manual instrument in the family sitting room. By the age of 11, Jehan was substituting at St. Germain-en-Laye.

Between 1927 and 1939, he attended the Paris Conservatoire and achieved First Prize in Harmony under André Bloch and First Prize in Fugue with Georges Caussade. He studied the organ with Marcel Dupré, under whose direction he took first prize for Organ and Improvisation in 1939. His studies in composition with Paul Dukas and Jean Roger-Ducasse won him the Prix des amis de l'orgue in 1936 for his Suite for Organ, Op. 48: Introduction, Variations, Scherzo and Choral.

He was appointed organist of Eglise Saint-Nicolas de Maisons-Laffitte in Paris in 1935, and remained there for four years. He also played regularly at the Rue Notre-Dame-de-Nazareth synagogue. The only known recording of his playing—a six-minute improvisation—was made in 1938 at that synagogue.

His short career as a composer began in 1929, when Alain was 18, and lasted until the outbreak of the Second World War 10 years later. His music was influenced not only by the musical language of the earlier Claude Debussy and his own contemporary Olivier Messiaen (seen in Le jardin suspendu, 1934), but also by an interest in the music, dance and philosophies of the far east (acquired at the Exposition coloniale internationale of 1931 and seen in Deux danses à Agni Yavishta, 1932, and Deuxième fantaisie, 1936), a renaissance of baroque music (seen in Variations sur un thème de Clément Janequin, 1937), and in jazz (seen in Trois danses of 1939). Alain described Le jardin suspendu ("The Hanging Garden") as a portrayal of "the ideal, perpetual pursuit and escape of the artist, an inaccessible and inviolable refuge".

Variations sur un thème de Clément Janequin
Variations on a theme of Clément Janequin, composed in 1937, run time of three minutes and 45 seconds, "JA 118", performed by Marc Giacone

He wrote choral music, including a Requiem Mass, chamber music, songs and three volumes of piano music. But it is his organ music for which he is best known. His most famous work is Litanies, composed in 1937. That work is prefaced with the text: "Quand l’âme chrétienne ne trouve plus de mots nouveaux dans la détresse pour implorer la miséricorde de Dieu, elle répète sans cesse la même invocation avec une foi véhémente. La raison atteint sa limite. Seule, la foi poursuit son ascension." ("When the Christian soul no longer finds new words in its distress to implore God's mercy, it repeats incessantly the same invocation with a vehement faith. Reason has reached its limits. Alone, faith pursues its ascension"). Deuils ("mourning"), the second of the Trois danses, is dedicated to Odile (Alain's deceased sister) as a "Funeral Dance to an Heroic Memory".

Always interested in mechanics, Alain was a skilled motorcyclist and became a dispatch rider in the Eighth Motorised Armour Division of the French Army. On 20 June 1940, he was assigned to reconnoitre the German advance on the eastern side of Saumur, and encountered a group of German soldiers at Le Petit-Puy. Coming around a curve, and hearing the approaching tread of the Germans, he abandoned his motorcycle. After using his machine gun to shoot several infantry soldiers who had ordered him to surrender, he was killed. He was posthumously awarded the Croix de Guerre for his bravery, and was provisionally buried at the place where he had died.

Prière pour nous autres charnels by Jehan Alain was played at 'In memoriam', a concert given by the Orchestre national et chœurs de la Radiodiffusion Française (dir. Manuel Rosenthal) on 2 November 1944 (Palais de Chaillot) in homage to three composers who died for France in 1940 : Maurice Jaubert, Jean Vuillermoz and Jehan Alain.

He left behind his wife, Madeleine Payan, whom he had married in 1935, his three children Denis, Agnès, and Lise, and a body of compositions viewed by many to have been amongst the most original of the 20th century.

Henri Dutilleux's Les citations contains a quotation from Jehan Alain's music. Maurice Duruflé wrote a musical tribute to Jehan Alain with his Prélude et fugue sur le nom d'A.L.A.I.N, Op. 7 for organ.

== Publication ==
Helga Schauerte-Maubouet: Jehan Alain, Mourir à trente ans, Sampzon, Delatour France, 2020; translated into English by Carolyn Shuster Fournier and Connie Glessner: Jehan Alain, Understanding His Musical Genius, Sampzon, Delatour France, 2022.

== Chronological catalogue ==
The 'JA' (Jehan Alain) catalogue was assembled by the composer's sister Marie-Claire Alain in 2001, building upon a classification scheme Alain himself used for organising his sketches and manuscripts.

Since the organisation is completely arbitrary, it is not supposed to be treated as a 'catalogue' (c.f. the Bach-Werke-Verzeichnis and Köchel catalogue for the œuvres of Johann Sebastian Bach and Wolfgang Amadeus Mozart, respectively) of his compositions: therefore, the numbers should not be used to designate the work titles. As a matter of fact, Alain occasionally himself used opus numbers for his compositions proper.

- 1929 – 18 years old – 4 opus

JA 021 – Togo, pour piano [June 1929]
JA 007 bis – Berceuse sur deux notes qui cornent, pour orgue [August 1929]
JA 003 – Étude sur un thème de quatre notes, pour piano [November 1929]
JA 008 – Chanson triste, pour piano [1929]

- 1930 – 19 years old – 14 opus

JA 009 – Ballade en mode phrygien, pour orgue ou piano [January 1930]
JA 002 – Thème et cinq variations, pour piano [February 1930]
JA 014 – Lamento, pour orgue [February 1930]
JA 001 – Quarante variations, pour piano [April 1930]
JA 017 – Des nuages gris, pour deux pianos [June 1930]
JA 004 – Ecce ancilla Domini, pour piano [August 1930]
JA 029 – Postlude pour l'Office de Complies, pour orgue [August 1930]
JA 130 – Adagio, pour piano [12 August 1930]
JA 005 – Seigneur, donne-nous la paix éternelle (Choral), pour piano [October 1930]
JA 007 – Etude de sonorité sur une double pédale, pour piano [October 1930]
JA 010 – Etude sur les doubles notes, pour piano [October 1930]
JA 020 – Pour le déchiffrage, pour piano [December 1930]
JA 131 – Variations sur un thème donné de Rimsky-Korsakov, pour quatre voix [December 1930]
JA 131A – Variations sur un chant donné de Rimsky-Korsakov, pour orgue [December 1930]
JA 131B – Variations sur un thème donné de Rimsky-Korsakov, pour quatuor à cordes [December 1930]
JA 129 – Lettre à son amie Lola pour la consoler d'avoir attrapé la grippe, pour piano [1930]

- 1931 – 20 years old – 12 opus

JA 012 – Petite rhapsodie, pour piano [February 1931]
JA 016 – Mélodie-sandwich, pour piano [23 February 1931]
JA 006 – Verset-choral, pour orgue ou piano [March 1931]
JA 011 – Lumière qui tombe d'un vasistas, pour piano [April 1931]
JA 015 – Histoire sur un tapis, entre des murs blancs, pour piano [May 1931]
JA 018 – Canons à sept, pour deux pianos [May 1931]
JA 013 – Heureusement, la bonne fée sa marraine..., pour piano [10 August 1931]
JA 019 – Nocturne, soir du 22 août 31, pour piano [22 August 1931]
JA 022 – En dévissant mes chaussettes, pour piano [September 1931]
JA 023 – 26 septembre 1931, pour piano [26 September 1931]
JA 024 – Dans le rêve laissé par la Ballade des pendus de François Villon, pour piano [4 October 1931]
JA 143 – Pièces d'après François Campion, pour orgue [1931]

- 1932 – 21 years old – 14 opus

JA 025 – Choral et variations – Mythologies japonaises, pour piano [1932]
JA 027 – Variations sur Lucis creator, pour orgue [January 1932]
JA 028 – Fugue en mode de fa, pour orgue ou piano [1932]
JA 035 – O quam suavis est, pour baryton [1932]
JA 036 – Le rosier de Mme Husson, pour piano [March 1932]
JA 037 – Chant donné, pour orgue ou piano [1932]
JA 061 – Canon, pour piano et harmonium [1932]
JA 079 – Climat, pour orgue [March 1932]
JA 030 – Trois minutes : Un cercle d'argent, pour piano ou orgue [1932]
JA 031 – Trois minutes : Romance, pour piano ou orgue [1932]
JA 032 – Trois minutes : Grave, pour piano ou orgue [August 1932]
JA 034 – Cantique en mode phrygien, pour quatre voix mixtes [septembre 1932]
JA 077 – Première danse à Agni Yavishta, pour orgue [13 October 1932]
JA 078 – Deuxième danse à Agni Yavishta, pour orgue [13 October 1932]
JA 033 – Petite pièce, pour orgue [December 1932]
JA 038 – Complainte à la mode ancienne, pour orgue [1932]
JA 132 – Chant nuptial, pour baryton et orgue [1932]
JA 132A – Chant nuptial, pour baryton, basse, violoncelle et orgue [1932]

- 1933 – 22 years old – 6 opus

JA 026 – Variations chorales sur Sacris solemniis, pour cinq voix mixtes et orgue [January 1933]
JA 064 – Premier Prélude profane (Wieder an), pour orgue ou piano [February 1933]
JA 064A – Adagio en quintette, pour quintette à cordes [1933]
JA 065 – Deuxième Prélude profane (Und jetzt), pour orgue ou piano [6 March 1933]
JA 039 – Chanson à bouche fermée, pour quatre voix mixtes [1933]
JA 133 – Fugue sur un sujet de Henri Rabaud, pour quatre voix [1933]
JA 133A – Fugue sur un sujet de Henri Rabaud, pour orgue [1933]
JA 133B – Fugue sur un sujet de Henri Rabaud, pour quatuor à cordes [1933]
JA 072 – Première fantaisie, pour orgue [1933]
JA 80A – Prélude, pour quintette à cordes [1933]

- 1934 – 23 years old – 5 opus

JA 134 – Choral cistercien pour une Élévation, pour orgue [April 1934]
JA 066 – Intermezzo, pour deux pianos et basson [June 1934]
JA 066 bis – Intermezzo, pour orgue [March 1935]
JA 074 – Trois mouvements : Allegretto con grazia, pour flûte et piano [August 1934]
JA 074A – Intermède, pour violoncelle et piano [August 1934]
JA 074B – Trois mouvements, pour flûte et piano ou violon et piano [1934]
JA 073 – Trois mouvements : Andante, pour flûte et piano [January 1935]
JA 073A – Trois mouvements : Allegro vivace, pour flûte et piano [1935]
JA 074C – Trois mouvements, pour flûte et orgue [1975]
JA 071 – Le jardin suspendu, pour orgue [October 1934]
JA 069 – Suite pour orgue : Introduction et variations, pour orgue [1935]
JA 069A – Andante con variazioni, pour quintette à cordes [1934]
JA 070 – Suite pour orgue : Scherzo, pour orgue [1935]
JA 070A – Scherzo, pour quintette à cordes [1934]
JA 082 – Suite pour orgue : Choral, pour orgue [1935]

- 1935 – 24 years old – 13 opus

JA 081 – Andante, pour piano [January 1935]
JA 081 bis – Largo assai, ma molto rubato, pour violoncelle et piano [1935]
JA 047 – Fantaisie pour chour à bouche fermée, pour trois voix mixtes [9 August 1935]
JA 057 – Fugue, pour orgue [1935]
JA 057A – Fugue, pour piano [1935]
JA 058 – Laisse les nuages blancs, pour soprano ou ténor [1935]
JA 060 – Foire, pour une voix et piano [1935]
JA 062 – De Jules Lemaître, pour orgue ou piano [1935]
JA 063 – Fantasmagorie, pour orgue ou piano [1935]
JA 067 – Choral dorien, pour orgue [1935]
JA 068 – Choral phrygien, pour orgue [1935]
JA 075 – Prélude, pour orgue [1935]
JA 076 – Nocturne, pour piano [1935]
JA 080 – Suite monodique : Animato, pour piano [1935]
JA 089 – Suite monodique : Adagio, molto rubato, pour piano [1935]
JA 89 bis – Andante, pour orgue [1935]
JA 116 – Suite monodique : Vivace, pour piano [1935]
JA 116A – Vivace, pour harpe
JA 087 – Prélude, pour piano [1935]
JA 087A – Prélude et fugue, pour piano [1935]

- 1936 – 25 years old – 4 opus

JA 086 – Berceuse, pour piano [17 avril 1936]
JA 088 – Chanson tirée du "chat-qui-s'en-va-tout-seul", pour soprano [1936]
JA 091 – Tarass Boulba, pour piano [October 1936]
JA 117 – Deuxième Fantaisie, pour orgue [1936]

- 1937 – 26 years old – 13 opus

JA 119 – Litanies, pour orgue [August 1937]
JA 119A – Litanies, pour deux pianos, transcribed by Olivier Alain
JA 084 – Quand Marion..., pour piano [1937]
JA 085 – Nous n'irons plus au bois..., pour piano [1937]
JA 090 – Complainte de Jean Renaud, pour quatre voix mixtes [1937]
JA 092 – Final pour une sonatine facile, pour piano [1937]
JA 093 – Suite facile : Barcarolle, pour piano [1937]
JA 094 – Invention à trois voix, pour flûte, hautbois et clarinette [1937]
JA 094A – Invention à trois voix, pour flûte et orgue [1937]
JA 095 – Vocalise dorienne, pour soprano et orgue [March 1937]
JA 095A – Vocalise dorienne – Ave Maria, pour soprano et orgue [1937]
JA 098 – O salutaris, a cappella, pour deux voix égales [1937]
JA 099 – Idée pour improviser sur le Christe eleison, pour piano [1937]
JA 100 – Idée pour improviser sur le deuxième Amen, pour piano [1937]
JA 118 – Variations sur un thème de Clément Janequin, pour orgue [1937]
JA 120 – Trois danses : Joies, Deuils, Luttes, pour orchestre [1937]
JA 120D – Sarabande, pour orgue, quintette à cordes et timbales [1938]
JA 120 bis – Danse funèbre pour honorer une mémoire héroïque, pour orgue [1938]
JA 120A – Trois danses : Joies, Deuils, Luttes, pour orgue [1940]
JA 120C – Trois danses : Joies, Deuils, Luttes, pour deux pianos [1944]
JA 120B – Trois danses : Joies, Deuils, Luttes, pour orchestre [1945]

- 1938 – 27 years old – 21 opus

JA 122 – Tantum ergo, pour deux voix inégales (sic) et orgue [18 January 1938]
JA 136 – Messe modale en septuor, pour soprano, alto, flûte et quatuor à cordes ou orgue [6 August 1938]
JA 135 – Monodie, pour orgue ou piano [8 September 1938]
JA 135A – Monodie, pour flûte [1938]
JA 138 – Aria, pour orgue [November 1938]
JA 138A – Aria, pour flûte et orgue [1938]
JA 083 – O salutaris, dit de Dugay, pour quatre voix mixtes [1938]
JA 096 – Faux-Bourdon pour le Laudate du VIème ton, pour trois voix égales [1938]
JA 097 – Le petit Jésus s'en va-t-à l'école, pour piano [1938]
JA 101 – Noël nouvelet, pour trois voix mixtes [1938]
JA 101 A – Noël nouvelet, pour orgue
JA 112 – Que j'aime ce divin Enfant, pour trois voix mixtes [1938]
JA 112A – Que j'aime ce divin Enfant, pour deux voix égales et orgue [1938]
JA 113 – D'où vient qu'en cette nuitée..., pour deux voix égales et orgue [1938]
JA 113A – D'où vient qu'en cette nuitée..., pour quatre voix mixtes [1990]
JA 114 – Le Père Noël passera-t-il ?, pour une voix [1938]
JA 115 – Transcription du Récit de Nazard de Clérambault, pour flûte et orgue [1938]
JA 121 – Marche de Saint Nicolas, pour deux clairons, tambour et orgue [1938]
JA 121A – Marche des Horaces et des Curiaces, pour deux clairons, tambour et orgue [1938]
JA 124 – Messe grégorienne de mariage, pour une voix et quatuor à cordes [1938]
JA 125 – Messe de Requiem, pour quatre voix mixtes [1938]
JA 126 – Fragment de la cantate de J. S. Bach Erschallet, ihr Lieder, pour deux trompettes et orgue [1938]
JA 127 – Allegro du Concerto en sol majeur (sic) de Händel, pour deux trompettes et orgue [1938]
JA 128 – Concerto en si bémol majeur de Händel, pour deux trompettes et orgue [1938]
JA 137 – Prière pour nous autres charnels, pour ténor, basse et orgue [1938]
JA 137 A – Prière pour nous autres charnels, pour orchestre [orchestrated by Henri Dutilleux, 1946]
JA 139 – L'année liturgique israëlite, pour orgue [1938]
JA 140 – Tantum ergo, pour soprano, baryton et orgue [1938]

- 1939 – 28 years old – 3 opus

JA 123 – Tu es Petrus, pour trois voix mixtes [1939]
JA 141 – Salve, virilis pectoris, pour soprano, ténor et orgue [1939]
JA 142 – O salutaris, pour soprano et orgue [1939]

- Undated – 17 opus

JA 040 – Une scie, pour piano
JA 041 – Il pleuvra toute la journée, pour piano
JA 042 – Sur le mode ré, mi, fa..., pour piano
JA 043 – Adagio, pour violoncelle et piano
JA 044 – Amen, pour piano
JA 045 – Un très vieux motif, pour piano
JA 046 – Post-scriptum, pour deux pianos
JA 048 – Théorie, pour piano
JA 049 – Le gai liseron, pour piano
JA 050 – Sonata, pour piano
JA 051 – Mephisto, pour piano
JA 052 – La peste, pour piano
JA 053 – Exposition
JA 054 – Sujet
JA 055 – Comme quoi les projets les plus belliqueux..., pour piano
JA 056 – Le bon Roi Dagobert, pour piano
JA 059 – Histoire d'un homme qui jouait de la trompette dans la forêt vierge, pour piano
