= Saint-Germain-en-Laye =

Commune in Yvelines, Île-de-France, France

- Subprefecture and commune
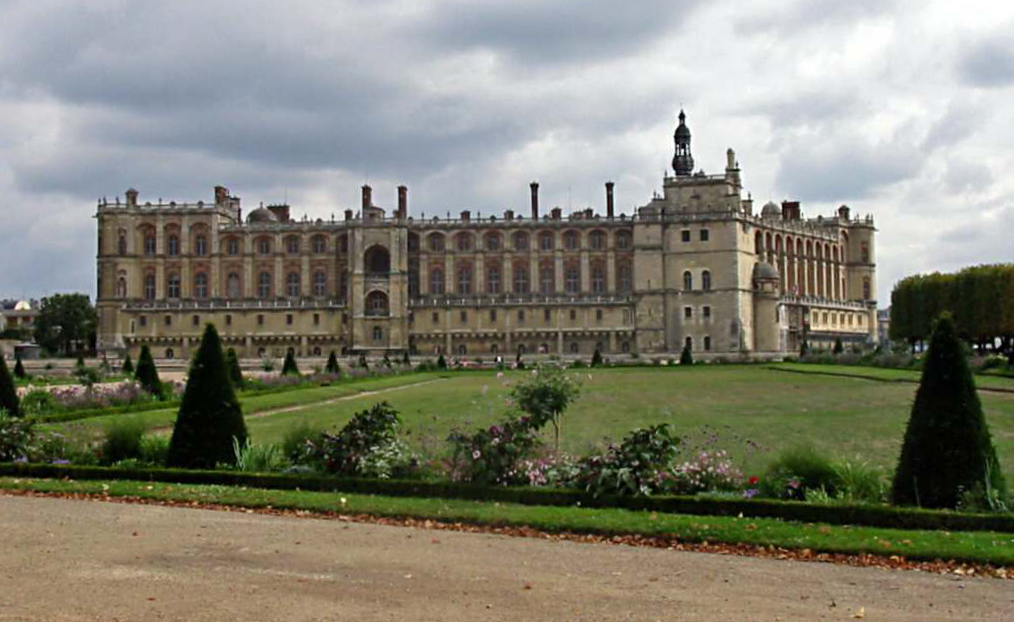
- Château de Saint-Germain-en-Laye

- Coat of arms
- Location of Saint-Germain-en-Laye
- Location within France Location within Île-de-France (region)
- Coordinates: 48°53′56″N 2°05′38″E
- Country: France
- Region: Île-de-France
- Department: Yvelines
- Arrondissement: Saint-Germain-en-Laye
- Canton: Saint-Germain-en-Laye
- Intercommunality: CA Saint Germain Boucles Seine

Government
  - Mayor (2020–2026): Arnaud Pericard
- Area^{1}: 51.94 km^{2} (20.05 sq mi)
- Elevation: 78 m (256 ft)
- Highest elevation: 107 m (351 ft)
- Lowest elevation: 22 m (72 ft)
- Population (2023): 45,931
  - Density: 884.3/km^{2} (2,290/sq mi)
- Demonym(s): Saint-Germanois; Saint-Germinois
- Time zone: UTC+01:00 (CET)
  - Summer (DST): UTC+02:00 (CEST)
- INSEE/Postal code: 78551 /78100 & 78112
- ^{1} French Land Register data, which excludes lakes, ponds, glaciers > 1 km^{2} (0.386 sq mi or 247 acres) and river estuaries.

Saint-Germain-en-Laye (French: [sɛ̃ ʒɛʁmɛ̃ ɑ̃ lɛ]) is a commune in the Yvelines department in the Île-de-France in north-central France. It is located in the western suburbs of Paris, 19.1 km (11.9 mi) from the centre of Paris.

Inhabitants are called Saint-Germanois or Saint-Germinois. With its tree-lined streets it is one of the more affluent suburbs of Paris, combining both high-end leisure spots and exclusive residential neighborhoods (see the Golden Triangle of the Yvelines).

Saint-Germain-en-Laye is a sub-prefecture of the department. Because it includes the National Forest of Saint-Germain-en-Laye, it covers approximately 48 km^{2} (19 sq mi), making it the largest commune in the Yvelines. It occupies a large loop of the Seine. Saint-Germain-en-Laye lies at one of the western termini of Line A of the RER.

== History ==
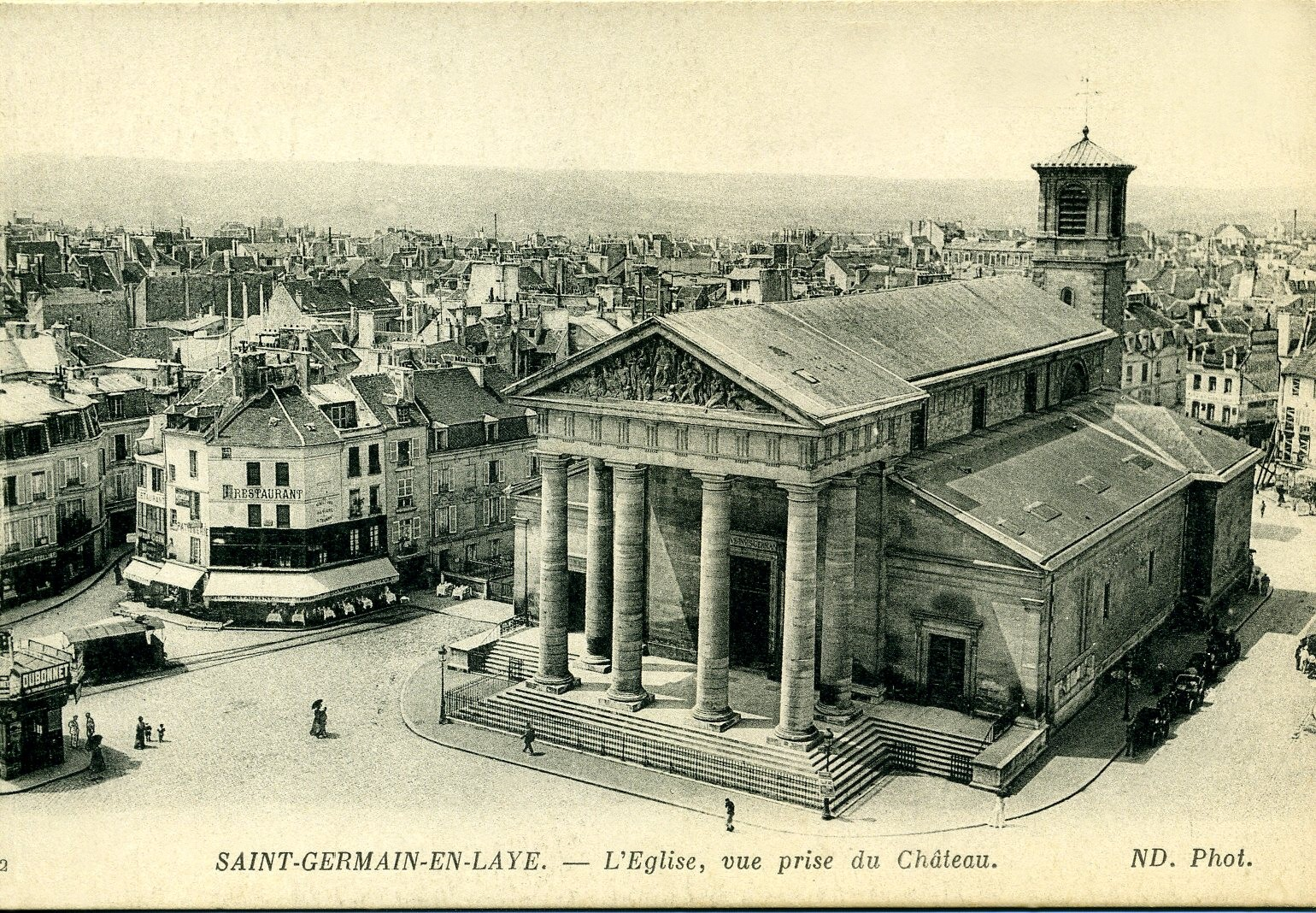
A view of the Saint-Germain church in Saint-Germin-en-Laye, taken from the castle

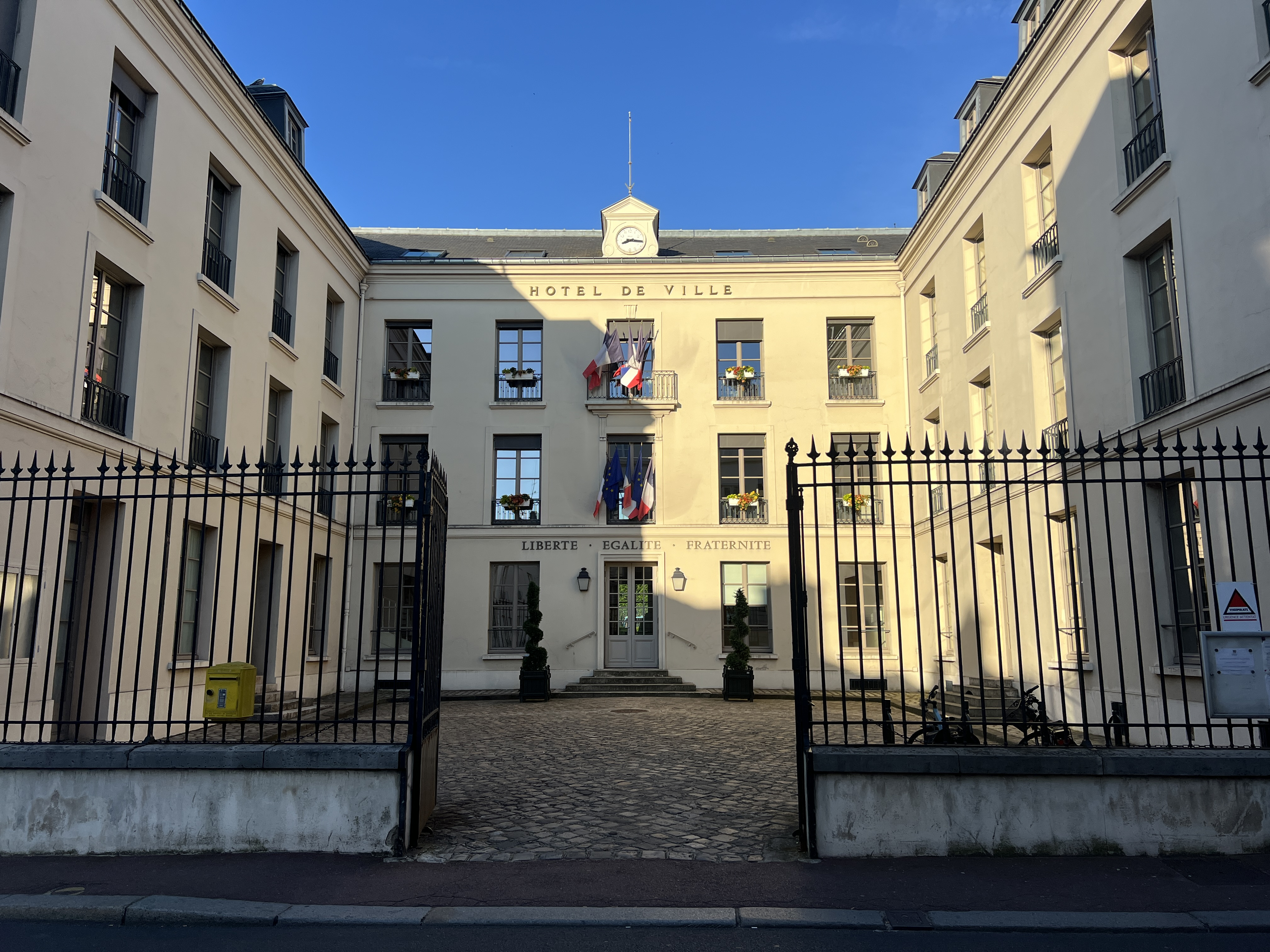
The Hôtel de Ville

Saint-Germain-en-Laye was founded in 1020 when King Robert the Pious (ruled 996–1031) founded a convent on the site of the present Church of Saint-Germain.

The Hôtel de Ville is a former private house dating from the second half of the 16th century.

In 1688, James II of England exiled himself to the city after being deposed from the throne in what has become known as the Glorious Revolution. He spent the remainder of his days there, and died on 16 September 1701.

Prior to the French Revolution in 1789, it had been a royal town and the Château de Saint-Germain the residence of numerous French monarchs. The old château was constructed in 1348 by King Charles V on the foundations of an old castle (château-fort) dating from 1238 in the time of Saint Louis. Francis I was responsible for its subsequent restoration. In 1862, Napoleon III set up the Musée des Antiquités Nationales in the erstwhile royal château. This museum has exhibits ranging from Paleolithic to Celtic times. The "Dame de Brassempouy" sculpted on a mammoth's ivory tusk around 23,000 years ago is the most famous exhibit in the museum.

Kings Henry IV and Louis XIII left their mark on the town. Louis XIV was born in the château, and established Saint-Germain-en-Laye as his principal residence from 1661 to 1681. The city's coat of arms consequently shows a cradle and the date of his birth. Louis XIV turned over the château to James VII & II of Scotland and England after his exile from Britain after the Glorious Revolution in 1688. James lived in the Château for 13 years, and his daughter Louisa Maria Stuart was born in exile here in 1692. James II is buried in the parish church.

Saint-Germain-en-Laye is famous for its 2.4-kilometre (1.5 mi) long stone terrace built by André Le Nôtre from 1669 to 1673. The terrace provides a view over the valley of the Seine and, in the distance, Paris. During the French Revolution, the name was changed along with many other places whose names held connotations of religion or royalty. Temporarily, Saint-Germain-en-Laye became Montagne-du-Bon-Air. During his reign, Napoleon established his cavalry officers training school in the Château-Vieux.

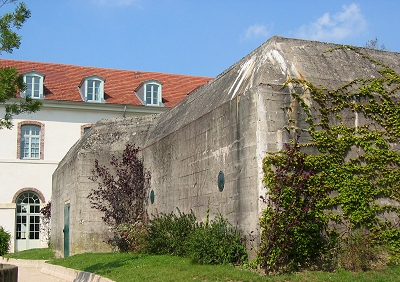
One of the German bunkers built in 1942

The Treaty of Saint-Germain was signed in 1919 and was applied on 16 July 1920. The treaty officially registered the breakup of the Habsburg empire, which recognized the independence of Czechoslovakia, Poland, Hungary, and the Kingdom of the Serbs, Croats, and Slovenes (Yugoslavia).

In 1880, the town saw the erection of a statue of Adolphe Thiers, responsible for the massacre of the Paris Commune. The following year, this statue was targeted by the Thiers statue bombing, where a "French Revolutionary Committee", probably an anarchist group, failed to destroy the statue. It was one of the first propaganda by the deed attacks, and the first in France.

During the occupation from 1940 to 1944, the town was the headquarters of the Oberbefehlshaber West, the commander of the German armed forces on the Western Front. It has been called "the most occupied city in France."

In January 2019, the former commune Fourqueux was merged into Saint-Germain-en-Laye.

=== Saint-Germain parish church ===
The parish church, which is dedicated to Germain of Paris, was originally constructed in the eleventh century. The present building, the fourth on the site, was built in the 1820s in a Neoclassical style, with six Tuscan columns supporting a pediment on the main façade. The church houses the mausoleum of James II of England and was visited by Queen Victoria in 1855.

The organ, originally installed in 1698, was rebuilt by Aristide Cavaillé-Coll in the nineteenth century and refurbished in 1903. The church's organists have included Albert Renaud (1891–1924), Albert Alain (1924–1971) and Marie-Claire Alain (1971–2010).

== Population ==
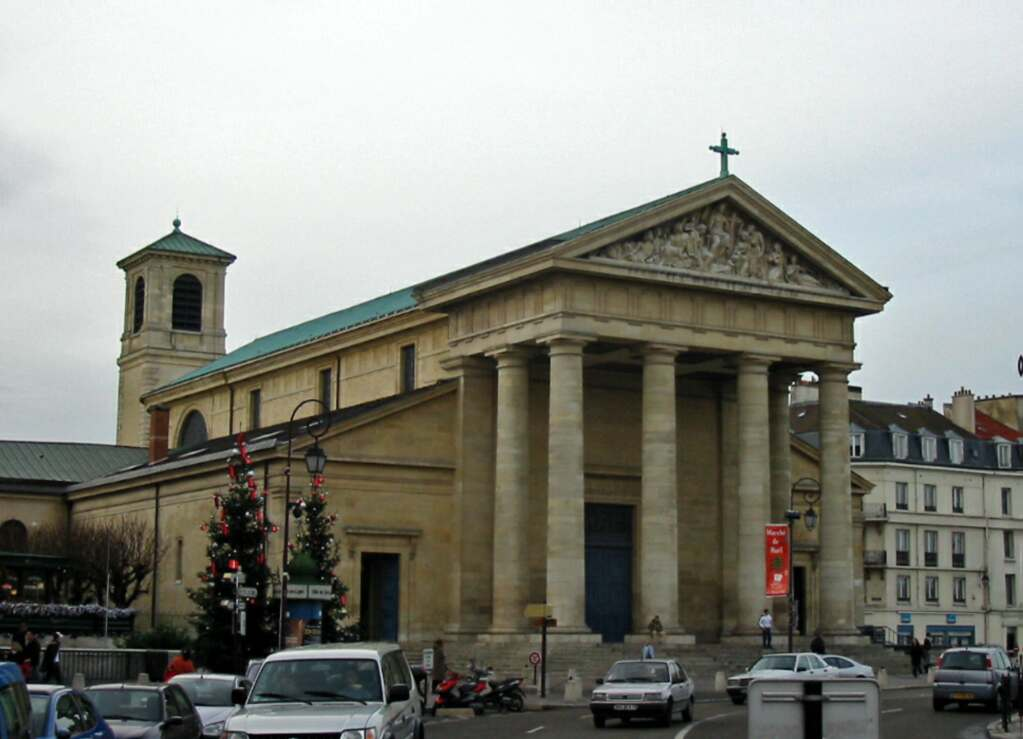
The Church of Saint-Germain

The population data in the table and graph below refer to the commune of Saint-Germain-en-Laye proper, in its geography at the given years. The population of Fourqueux, absorbed in 2019, is not included in data before 2019.

Historical population

Year	Pop.	±% p.a.
1793	13,400	—
1800	8,954	−5.60%
1806	9,798	+1.51%
1821	10,291	+0.33%
1831	10,671	+0.36%
1836	10,951	+0.52%
1841	13,618	+4.46%
1846	13,488	−0.19%
1851	12,527	−1.47%
1856	14,283	+2.66%
1861	15,708	+1.92%
1866	17,478	+2.16%
1872	22,862	+4.58%
1876	17,199	−6.87%
1881	15,790	−1.69%
1886	16,312	+0.65%
1891	14,262	−2.65%
1896	16,489	+2.94%
1901	17,297	+0.96%

Year	Pop.	±% p.a.
1906	17,288	−0.01%
1911	18,344	+1.19%
1921	20,008	+0.87%
1926	22,180	+2.08%
1931	21,996	−0.17%
1936	22,539	+0.49%
1946	22,013	−0.24%
1954	29,429	+3.70%
1962	34,621	+2.05%
1968	38,308	+1.70%
1975	37,509	−0.30%
1982	38,499	+0.37%
1990	39,926	+0.46%
1999	38,423	−0.43%
2007	41,517	+0.97%
2012	39,476	−1.00%
2017	40,765	+0.64%
2023	45,931	+2.01%

Source: EHESS and INSEE (2007-2023)

== Transport ==
Saint-Germain-en-Laye is connected to other communes by the Résalys bus network operated by Transdev. Saint-Germain-en-Laye is served by Saint-Germain-en-Laye station on Paris RER line A, commonly known as RER A.

It was served by two stations on the Grande Ceinture Ouest branch of the Transilien Paris-Saint-Lazare suburban rail line: Saint-Germain-Bel-Air–Fourqueux and Saint-Germain–Grande Ceinture. The branch was in operation from December 2004 to June 2019.

In July 2022, the Île-de-France tramway Line 13 Express opened, serving the two former Grande Ceinture Ouest station, and two additional stations within Saint-Germain-en-Laye. This line connects Versailles Saint-Cyr to the Saint-Germain-en-Laye RER A station.

The Achères–Grand-Cormier station is within the Saint-Germain-en-Laye commune. It is served by the Paris RER line A and the Transilien Paris – Saint-Lazare suburban rail line. The station is located in the middle of the Forest of Saint-Germain-en-Laye, far from the urbanized part of the commune.

== Sport ==
=== Football ===
Saint-Germain-en-Laye has a proud footballing history. From 1904 to 1970, it was represented by Stade Saint-Germain, but following a 1970 merger with Paris FC, became Paris Saint-Germain (PSG). PSG is a top-flight football team that is the most successful team in France in terms of trophies.

=== Sporting facilities ===
There is one main sporting facility in Saint-Germain-en-Laye: the Stade Municipal Georges Lefèvre. It covers over 12 hectares and contains: – 5 football pitches – 3 stands – 1 athletic track – 22 tennis courts – 1 clubhouse – 1 multibeach terrain

== Economy ==
Capcom Entertainment France, a Capcom subsidiary, has its head office in Saint-Germain-en-Laye.

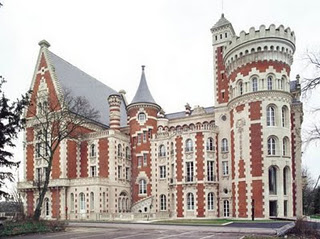
Lycée International de Saint Germain-en-Laye

== Education ==
In 2016, the schools in this commune had 20,581 students, with 7,300 of them living in Saint-Germain-en-Laye. There is a high ratio of students to town inhabitants. The municipal nursery and primary schools have 3,549 students. 1,026 students attend private schools in the commune.

=== Schools ===
As of 2016 the municipality operates ten nursery schools and nine primary schools.

Public schools include:

- Lycée Jeanne d'Albret
- Lycée technologique Léonard-de-Vinci
- Lycée technologique Jean-Baptiste-Poquelin
- lycée agricole et horticole de Saint-Germain-Chambourcy
- Collège Marcel Roby

Private schools include:

- Collège et Lycée Notre-Dame
- École Saint-Érembert
- Institut Saint Thomas de Villeneuve

The Lycée International de Saint Germain-en-Laye is a hybrid public/private international school. It teaches children from nursery to high school age, who follow both the public French curriculum and an international program. There are 14 language program options, some of which are public and others private.

Saint-Germain-en-Laye is also home to the Institut d'études politiques de Saint-Germain-en-Laye. The political science grande école was founded in 2013. In 2023, it had a student body of over 800.

=== Libraries ===
There are two libraries:

- Médiatèque Marc-Ferro
- Bibliothèque George-Sand

== In art ==
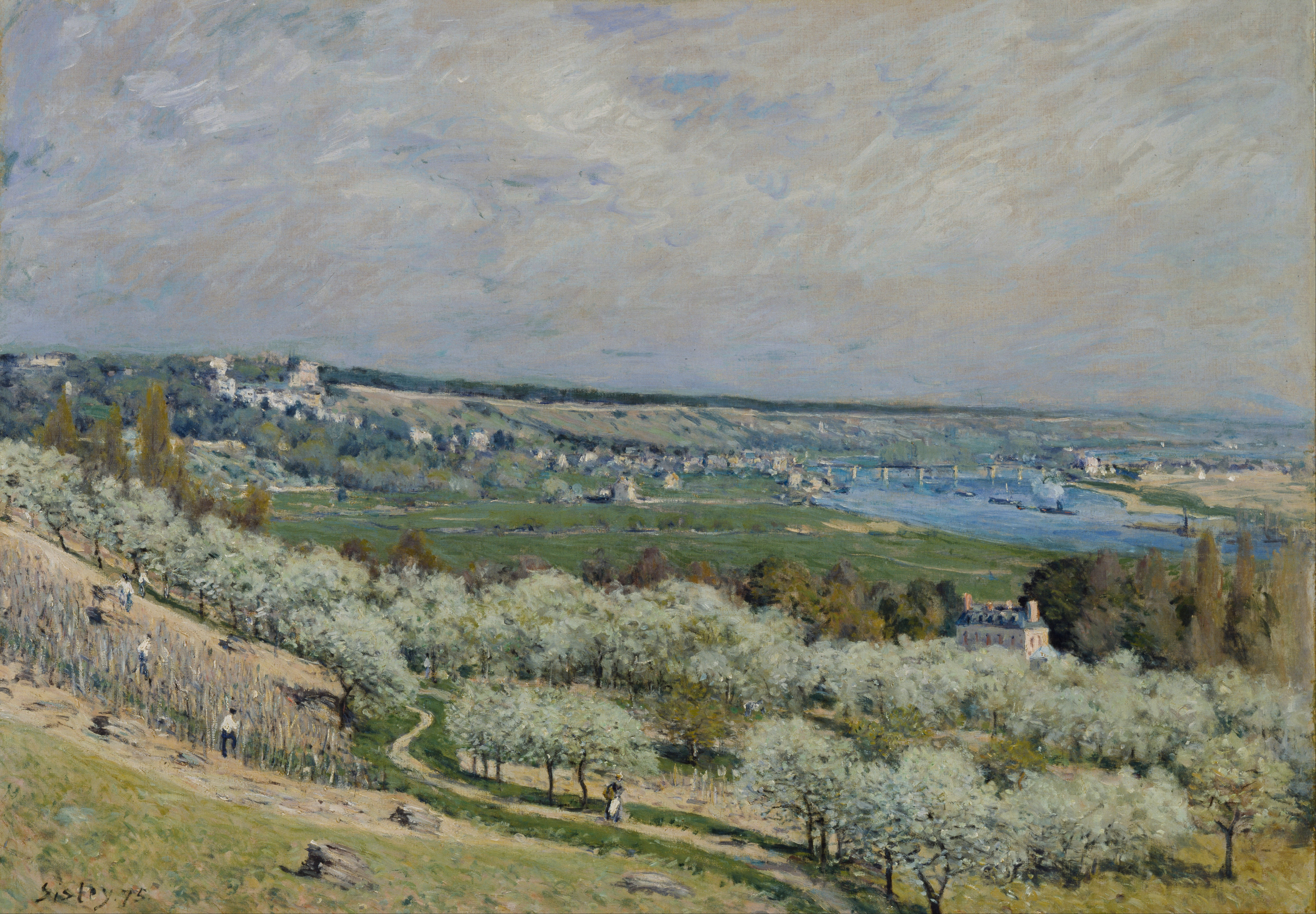
The Terrace at Saint-Germain, Spring, 1875 by Alfred Sisley. The Walters Art Museum

== Hospital ==
- Centre hospitalier intercommunal de Poissy-Saint-Germain-en-Laye mainly in Poissy.

== Notable people ==
=== Entertainment ===
- Jaque Catelain (1897–1965), actor
- Albert Dupontel (born 1964), actor
- Mélanie Thierry (born 1981), actress

=== Literature ===
- Christian de Boisredon (born 1974), author and social entrepreneur
- Virginie Greiner (born 1969), comic book scriptwriter
- Jean-Jacques Lafaye (born 1958), writer, essayist
- Gérard de Nerval (1808–1855), poet, who lived there during part of his childhood and adolescence
- Emmanuelle Polack (born 1965), author and art historian
- Charles Gautier de Vinfrais (1704–1797), encyclopédiste

=== Military ===
- John Patrick O'Gara (born 1692), soldier in the Spanish Army of Jacobite Irish descent
- Louis-Michel Letort de Lorville (1773–1815), French general of the Napoleonic Wars

=== Music ===
- Albert Renaud (1855–1924), organist
- Claude Debussy (1862–1918), composer
- Albert Alain (1880–1971), composer and organist
- Jehan Alain (1911–1940), composer
- Marie-Claire Alain (1926–2013), organist and organ teacher
- Ludovic Navarre (born 1955), electronic musician
- Benoît Delbecq (born 1966), jazz pianist and composer

=== Nobility ===
- Henry II (1519–1559), King of France
- James II of England, king who lived there in exile and is buried there
- Marie of France, Duchess of Bar (1344–1404)
- Jeanne d'Albret (1528–1572), Queen Regnant of Navarre
- Charles IX (1550–1574), King of France
- Louis de Buade de Frontenac (1622–1698), French courtier and Governor of New France
- Louis XIV (1638–1715), King of France
- Philippe I, Duke of Orléans, (1640–1701), younger brother of Louis XIV
- Louisa Maria Stuart (1692–1712), daughter of James II of England, known to Jacobites as the Princess Royal
- Charles O'Gara (1699–1777), a courtier and official of the Holy Roman Empire of Jacobite Irish descent

=== Politics ===
- Pierre Appell (1887–1957), French politician
- Marion Maréchal-Le Pen (born 1989), French politician

=== Religion ===
- Jacques Fesch (1930–1957), Christian mystic
- Pierre de Porcaro (1904–1945), priest and prisoner-of-war during the Second World War
- Maurice Noël Léon Couve de Murville (1929–2007), Archbishop of Birmingham

=== Science and engineering ===
- Jean Albert Gaudry (1827–1908), geologist and palaeontologist
- Gabriel de Mortillet (1821–1898), archeologist and anthropologist, mayor of the town from 1882 to1888
- Charles-Hippolyte de Paravey, engineer who died in the city
- Salomon Reinach (1858–1932), archaeologist
- Sylvie Vauclair (born 1946), astrophysicist

=== Sports ===
- Mohamed Haddadou (born 1974), footballer
- Amélie Mauresmo (born 1979), tennis player
- Bruno Besson (born 1979), racing driver
- Ismael Gace (born 1986), footballer
- Christopher Oualembo (born 1987), footballer
- Jonathan Eysseric (born 1990), tennis player
- Frédéric Vieillot (born 1990), footballer
- Caroline Garcia (born 1991), tennis player
- Rashad Muhammed (born 1993), footballer
- David Aubry (born 1996), swimmer
- Gabriel Aubry (born 1998), racing driver

== Twin towns – sister cities ==
Saint-Germain-en-Laye is twinned with:

- Aschaffenburg, Germany, since 1975
- Schwelm, Germany
- Ayr, South Ayrshire, Scotland, since 1984
- Winchester, Massachusetts, United States, since 1990
- Konstancin-Jeziorna, Poland, since 1992

== See also ==
- Communes of the Yvelines department
- The works of Antonin Mercié
