= Les Deux Pigeons =

Les Deux Pigeons can refer to:

- The Two Pigeons, a fable by Jean de la Fontaine
- Les Deux Pigeons (ballet) with music by André Messager and a libretto based on the fable
