= Théodore Dubois =

French composer and organist (1837–1924)

Dubois in 1896, the year he became director of the Paris Conservatoire

Clément François Théodore Dubois (French pronunciation: [klemɑ̃ fʁɑ̃swa teɔdɔʁ dybwa]; 24 August 1837 – 11 June 1924) was a French Romantic composer, organist and pedagogue.

After study at the Paris Conservatoire, Dubois won France's premier musical prize, the Prix de Rome in 1861. He became an organist and choirmaster at several well-known churches in Paris, and at the same time was a professor in the Conservatoire, teaching harmony from 1871 to 1891 and composition from 1891 to 1896, when he succeeded Ambroise Thomas as the Conservatoire's director. He continued his predecessor's strictly conservative curriculum and was forced to retire early after a scandal erupted over the faculty's attempt to rig the Prix de Rome competition to prevent the modernist Maurice Ravel from winning.

As a composer, Dubois was seen as capable and tasteful, but not strikingly original or inspired. He hoped for a career as an opera composer, but became better known for his church compositions. His books on music theory were influential, and remained in use for many years.

== Life and career ==
=== Early years ===
Dubois was born in Rosnay in Marne, a village near Reims. The family was not connected with the musical profession: his father Nicolas was a basket maker, his grandfather Jean was a schoolmaster. His mother Célinie Dubois (née Charbonnier) did not have a profession and mostly spent time raising the young Théodore. Dubois studied the piano under Louis Fanart, the choirmaster of Reims Cathedral, and was a protégé of the mayor of Rosnay, Vicomte Eugène de Breuil, who introduced him to the pianist Jean-Henri Ravina. Through Ravina's contacts, Dubois gained admission to the Paris Conservatoire, headed by Daniel Auber, in 1854. He studied the piano with Antoine François Marmontel, the organ with François Benoist, harmony with François Bazin and counterpoint and composition with Ambroise Thomas. While still a student he was engaged to play the organ at St Louis-des-Invalides from 1855 and Sainte-Clotilde (under César Franck) from 1858. He gained successively first prizes for harmony, fugue, and organ, and finally, in 1861, France's premier musical prize the Prix de Rome.

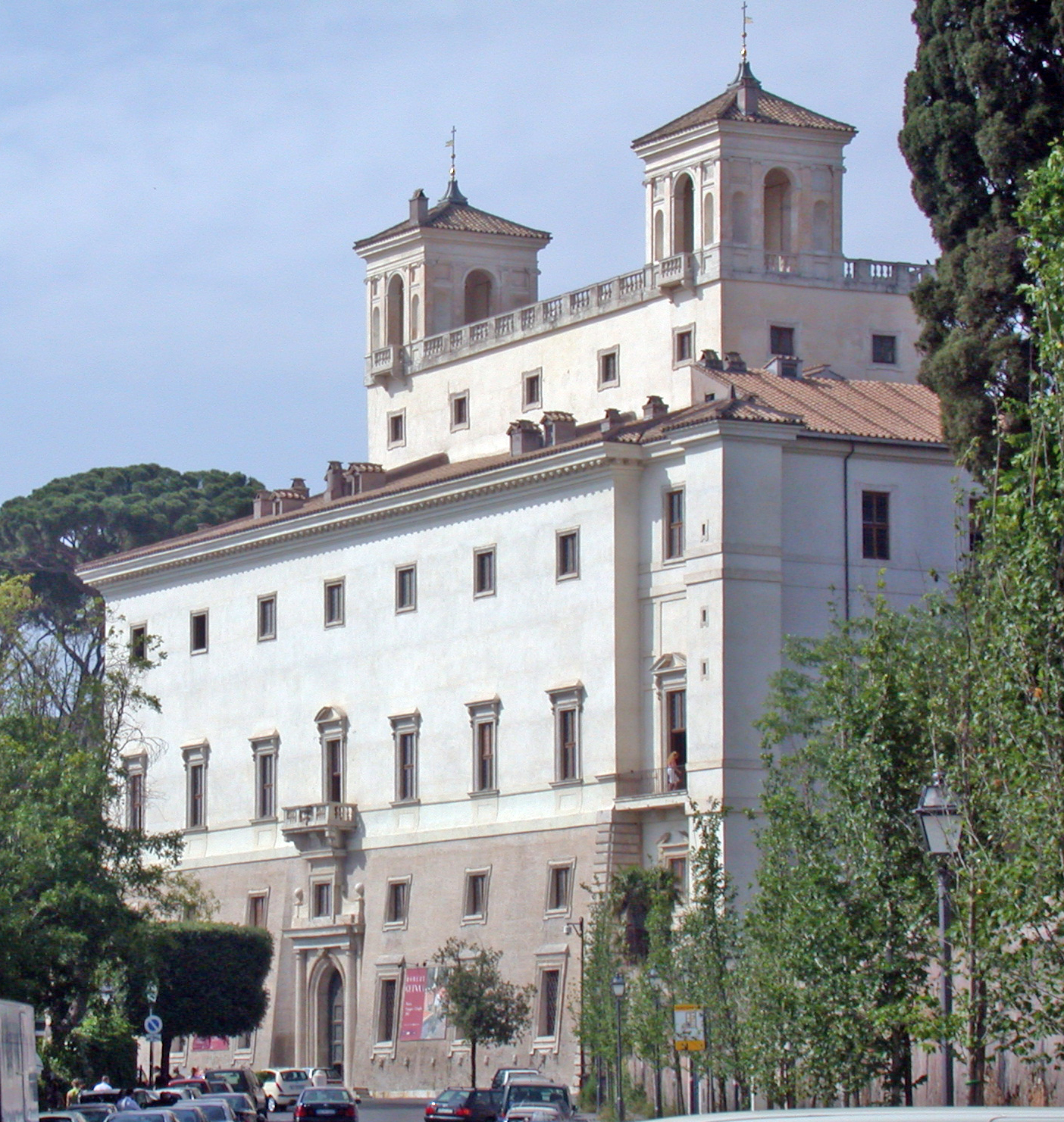
Villa de Medici, Rome

The Prix brought with it liberally subsidised accommodation and tuition at the French Academy in Rome, at the Villa de Medici. During his time there, beginning in December 1861, Dubois became a friend of fellow students including Jules Massenet. Between his studies he visited the monuments of Rome and the surrounding countryside, attended the musical performances of the Sistine Chapel, and made trips to Naples, Pompeii, Venice, Verona, Mantua, Milan and Florence. He gave his impressions musical form in an overture in the classical style, an Italian buffo opera (La prova di opera seria – Rehearsal of an opera seria) and finally a solemn Mass. Among the eminent musicians he met during his time in Rome was Franz Liszt, who heard the Mass and encouraged the young Dubois.

=== Return to Paris ===
On his return to Paris in 1866 Dubois was appointed maître de chapelle (choirmaster) at Sainte-Clotilde, where, on Good Friday, 1867, his forces performed his Les Sept paroles du Christ (The Seven Last Words of Christ), afterwards performed at the Concerts populaires (1870) and in many other churches.

Dubois' colleagues in the Société nationale de musique: clockwise from top left: Romain Bussine, Camille Saint-Saëns, Gabriel Fauré, César Franck

When Camille Saint-Saëns and Romain Bussine established the Société nationale de musique in 1871, Dubois was a founding member together with, among others, Henri Duparc, Gabriel Fauré, César Franck, Ernest Guiraud and Massenet. In the same year he was appointed choirmaster at the Church of the Madeleine. During the Franco-Prussian War of 1870–71 he joined the National Guard; his biographer Hugues Imbert records, "it was in military uniform that he and Saint-Saëns often met at the église de la Madeleine, one to lead the chapel choirs, the other to ascend to the great organ". Both men escaped the bloody final days of the Paris Commune, Saint-Saëns to England and Dubois to his family home in Rosnay.

Dubois joined the faculty of the Conservatoire in 1871, succeeding Antoine Elwart as professor of harmony; he retained the post for the next 20 years. His students in his harmony and, later, composition classes included Paul Dukas, George Enescu, Albéric Magnard and Florent Schmitt. (Note: Others included Auguste Chapuis, Guillaume Couture, Pierre de Bréville, Gustave Doret, Maurice Emmanuel, Gabrielle Ferrari, Louis Ganne, Dumitru Kiriac-Georgescu, Fernand de La Tombelle, Xavier Leroux, Clarence Lucas, Henriette Renié, Joseph Guy Ropartz, Spyridon Samaras and Charles Silver.) In August 1872 Dubois married the pianist Jeanne Duvinage (1843–1922), whose father was a conductor at the Opéra-Comique. It was a lifelong and happy marriage; they had two children.

Dubois had ambitions to be an opera composer, but was unable to gain a foothold at the major Parisian opera companies. At the old Théâtre Athénée his one-act La Guzla de l'Emir (The Emir's Lute), with a libretto by Jules Barbier and Michel Carré, was successfully given in 1873 in a triple bill with short operas by Jean Gregoire Penavaire and Paul Lacôme. In 1878 he shared with Benjamin Godard the prize at the Concours Musical instituted by the city of Paris, and his Paradis perdu (Paradise Lost) was performed, first at the public expense November 1878), and again on the two following Sundays at the Concerts du Châtelet.

In 1877 Saint-Saëns retired as organist of the Madeleine; Dubois replaced him and was succeeded as choirmaster by Fauré. In 1879 Dubois had an opera staged in one of the major Parisian houses: the Opéra Comique presented his one-act comedy Le Pain bis in February. Les Annales du théâtre et de la musique found the score unpretentious and "not without wit and or skill", and though not particularly original, nonetheless very elegant, with some excellent melodies. Together with Fauré, Dubois travelled to Munich in July 1880 to attend performances of Wagner's Tannhäuser and Die Meistersinger. Like Fauré, Dubois, though impressed by Wagner's music, did not allow it to influence his own compositions as many of their fellow French composers did, although on his return to Paris he made an intensive study of Wagner's scores.

Dubois never succeeded in having an opera staged by France's premier house, the Paris Opéra, but in 1883 the three-act ballet La Farandole, to Dubois' music, was given there, with Rosita Mauri in the lead. Les Annales commented on "distinguished music, of a melancholy hue, which lacks only a little more warmth and colour – the sun of the South", and added that although the music was not outstandingly inspired or original, it was capably written and well suited to the action throughout. The piece was popular and was frequently revived at the Opéra over the next few years. In the same year Dubois was appointed a chevalier of the Legion of Honour. It was also around this time that he gave lessons to the talented young Greek composer Spyridon Samaras, who was in Paris to continue his musical studies.

In 1884 Dubois had an expensive success with his four-act opera, Aben-Hamet. It opened at the Théâtre Italien in the Place du Châtelet and was enthusiastically received, but closed after four performances when a financial crisis forced the theatre out of business, leaving Dubois with personal liabilities to pay the singers' outstanding wages.

=== Later years ===
When Léo Delibes died in January 1891, Dubois was appointed to succeed him as professor of composition at the Conservatoire. After the death of Charles Gounod in 1894 Dubois was elected to succeed him as a member of the Académie des Beaux-Arts, a recognition, according to his biographer Jann Pasler, of "the clarity and idealism of his music".

1902 caricature of Dubois by Aroun-al-Rascid (Note: The printed commentary below is hostile, describing Dubois as "pète-sec un et pisse-froid … ressemble à un proviseur de petite ville": "fart-dry and piss-cold … looks like a small-town headmaster")

In 1896 Thomas, director of the Conservatoire since 1871, died. Massenet, professor of counterpoint, fugue and composition, was widely expected to succeed him but overplayed his hand by insisting on appointment for life. When the French government refused, he resigned from the faculty. (Note: An alternative explanation for Massenet's resignation was propounded by Massenet himself, who wrote in 1910 that he had remained in post as professor out of loyalty to Thomas, and was eager to abandon all academic work in favour of composing, a statement repeated by at least two of his biographers.) Dubois was appointed director and continued Thomas's intransigently conservative regime. The music of Auber, Halévy and especially Meyerbeer was regarded as the correct model for students, and old French music such as that of Rameau and modern music, including that of Wagner, were kept rigorously out of the curriculum. Dubois was unremittingly hostile to Maurice Ravel who, when a Conservatoire student, did not conform to the faculty's anti-modernism, and in 1902 Dubois unavailingly forbade Conservatoire students to attend performances of Debussy's ground-breaking new opera, Pelléas et Mélisande.

In June 1905 Dubois was forced to bring his planned retirement forward after a public scandal caused by the faculty's blatant attempt to stop Ravel winning the Prix de Rome. Fauré was appointed to succeed Dubois as director, with a brief from the French government to modernise the institution.

In his private capacity, Dubois was less reactionary than in the academic régime over which he presided. When Wagner's Parsifal had its belated Parisian premiere in 1914, Dubois said to his colleague Georges Hüe that no music more beautiful had ever been written. Privately he was fascinated by Debussy's music, with its "subtiles harmonies et les précieux raffinements" – subtle harmonies and precious refinements.

After his retirement from the Conservatoire, Dubois remained a familiar figure in Parisian musical circles. He was president of the association of Conservatoire alumni, and presided at its annual award ceremony. Until his final years he remained vigorous. The death of his wife in 1923 was a blow from which he did not recover, and he died at his Paris home, after a short illness, on 11 June 1924, aged 86.

== Music ==
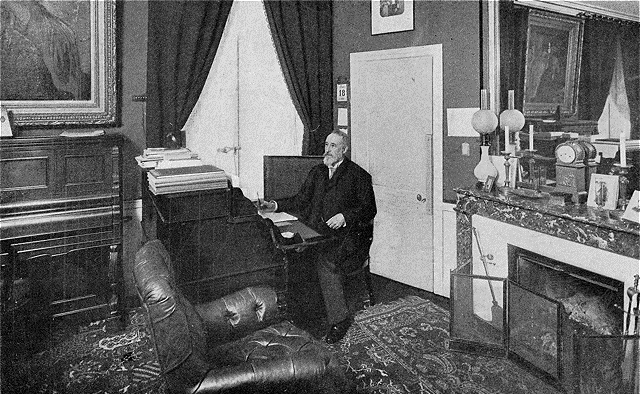
Dubois in 1905

Although he wrote many religious works, Dubois had hopes for a successful career in opera. His fascination with Near-Eastern subjects led to the composition to his first staged work, La guzla de l'émir, and his first four-act opera, Aben-Hamet. The latter received excellent notices, for the cast (led by Emma Calvé and Jean de Reszke) and the work, but it did not gain a place in the regular repertoire. His other large-scale opera, Xavière, described as "a dramatic idyll", is set in the rural Auvergne. The story revolves around a widowed mother who plots to kill her daughter, Xavière, with the help of her fiancé's father to gain the daughter's inheritance. Xavière survives the attack with the help of a priest, and the opera finishes with a conventional happy ending. Lucien Fugère and Mlle F. Dubois (no relation) led the cast at the Opéra-Comique, and the piece was pronounced a succès d'estime.

The music of Dubois also includes ballets, oratorios and three symphonies. His best known work is the oratorio Les sept paroles du Christ ("The Seven Last Words of Christ" [1867]), which continues to be performed from time to time. His Toccata in G (1889), remains in the regular organ repertoire. The rest of his large output has almost entirely disappeared from view. He has had a more lasting influence in teaching, with his theoretical works Traité de contrepoint et de fugue (on counterpoint and fugue) and Traité d'harmonie théorique et pratique (on harmony) still being sometimes used today.

=== Selected works ===
==== Operas ====
- La prova di un'opera seria, (unpublished, composed in Rome, 1863).
- La guzla de l'émir, opéra comique (1 act, J. Barbier & M. Carré), f.p. 30 April 1873, Théâtre de l'Athénée, Paris.
- Le pain bis, opéra comique (1 act, A. Brunswick & A.R. de Beauplan), f.p. 26/27 February 1879, Opéra-Comique (Théâtre Favart), Paris.
- L'enlèvement de Proserpine, scène lyrique (1 act, P. Collin), f.p. 1879.
- Aben-Hamet, opéra (4 acts, Léonce Détroyat & Achille de Lauzières), f.p. 16 December 1884, Théâtre du Châtelet, Paris.
- Xavière, idylle dramatique (3 acts, L. Gallet, after F. Fabre), f.p. 26 November 1895, Opéra Comique (Théâtre Lyrique), Paris.
- Miguela, opéra (3 acts) (Originally unperformed, except prélude and second act tableau from Act 3, concert perf. 23 February 1896, Paris.) f.p. 18 May 1916, Opéra, Paris.
- La fiancée d'Abydos (unperformed)
- Le florentin (unperformed)

==== Ballets ====
- La Korrigane, (ballet by Louis Mérante), f.p. 12 January 1880, Opéra, Paris.
- La Farandole, (ballet by Louis Mérante), f.p. 14 December 1883, Opéra-Comique, Paris.

=== Vocal works ===
- Les Sept Paroles du Christ, (1867) oratorio dedicated to Abbot Jean-Gaspard (1797-1871) curé of La Madeleine.
- Le Paradis Perdu, oratorio (1878 - Prix de la ville de Paris)
- Numerous cantatas, including: L'enlèvement de Proserpine, Hylas, Bergerette; Les Vivants et les Morts
- Masses and religious compositions

==== Orchestral works ====
- Marche héroïque de Jeanne d'Arc
- Fantaisie triomphale for organ & orchestra
- Hymne nuptial
- Adonis, poème symphonique (1901)
- Méditation, Prières for strings, oboe, harp, & organ
- Concerto-Capriccio for piano & orchestra, C minor (1876)
- Concerto pour violon (1896)
- Concerto pour piano n° 2, F minor (1897)
- Notre-Dame de la Mer, poème symphonique
- Symphonie française (1908)
- Symphonie n°2 (1911)
- Symphonie n°3 (1915)
- Evocation (1915)
- Fantasietta (1917)
- Suite for Piano and String Orchestra in F minor (1917)

==== Chamber music ====
- Cantabile (or Andante Cantabile) for viola or cello and piano (1886)
- Hymne nuptial for violin, viola, cello, harp and organ
- Petits rêves d'enfants for string quartet (1903)
- Quintet for oboe, violin, viola, cello and piano (1905)
- Terzettino for flute, viola and harp (1905)
- Piano Quartet in A minor (1907)
- String Quartet nr. 1 in E flat major (1909)
- Dectet for string and wind quintets
- Nonetto for flute, oboe, clarinet, bassoon, 2 violins, viola, cello and double bass
- Nocturne for cello and piano
- String Quartet nr. 2 in F major (1923).

==== Other compositions ====
- Piano works : Chœur et Danse des Lutins, Six Poèmes Sylvestres, etc.
- Numerous pieces for organ and for harmonium.
- Douze Pièces pour orgue ou piano-pédalier (1889), including the famous Toccata in G (no. 3)
- Douze Pièces Nouvelles pour orgue ou piano-pédalier (1893), including In Paradisum (no. 9)
- Deux Petites Pièces pour orgue ou harmonium (1910) : Petite pastorale champenoise et Prélude
- 42 Pièces pour orgue sans pédales ou harmonium (1925)

=== Writings ===
- Dubois, Théodore (1889). Notes et études d'harmonie pour servir de supplément au traité de H. Reber. Paris: Heugel.
- Dubois, Théodore (1901). Traité de contrepoint et de fugue. Paris: Heugel.
- Dubois, Théodore (1921). Traité d'harmonie théorique et pratique. Paris: Heugel.
- Dubois, Théodore (1921). Réalisations des basses et chants du Traité d'harmonie par Théodore Dubois. Paris: Heugel.

== Recording selection ==
- Théodore Dubois, Organistes de Paris à la Belle Époque, Vol 1 (2004), Helga Schauerte-Maubouet, Organ Merklin Cathedral in Moulins(F) Syrius 141382.
- Theodore Dubois, The Romantic Piano Concerto #60, (2013) Concerto-capriccioso in C minor; Piano Concerto #2 and Suite for Piano and String Orchestra, Cédric Tiberghien (pianist), BBC Scottish Symphony Orchestra, Andrew Manze-conductor, Hyperion 67931
- Théodore Dubois, Musique sacrée et symphonique & Musique de Chambre (2015), Various performers; BruZane ES1018RSK (Volume 2 in Collection Portraits)

=== Media ===
In Paradisum
Performed by Ashtar Moïra

Cantilène religieuse
Performed by Ulrich Metzner

Interlude
MIDI by Ulrich Metzner

== See also ==
- List of music students by teacher: C to F § Théodore Dubois

== Notes, references and sources ==
=== Sources ===
- Duchen, Jessica (2000). Gabriel Fauré. London: Phaidon. ISBN 978-0-71-483932-5.
- Irvine, Demar (1994). Massenet – A Chronicle of His Life and Times. Portland, Oregon: Amadeus Press. ISBN 978-1-57-467024-0.
- Johnson, Graham (2009). Gabriel Fauré – The Songs and their Poets. Farnham, UK; Burlington, US: Ashgate. ISBN 978-0-75-465960-0.
- Jones, J. Barrie (1989). Gabriel Fauré – A Life in Letters. London: Batsford. ISBN 978-0-71-345468-0.
- Jullien, Adolphe (1902). "Dubois, François Clément Théodore". Grove's Dictionary of Music and Musicians. Vol. 1 (second ed.). London: Macmillan. OCLC 861125.
- Massenet, Jules (1919) [1910]. My Recollections. Boston: Small Maynard. OCLC 774419363.
- Nectoux, Jean-Michel (1991). Gabriel Fauré: A Musical Life. Cambridge: Cambridge University Press. ISBN 978-0-52-161695-9.
- Nectoux, Jean-Michel (1994). Camille Saint-Saëns et Gabriel Fauré: Correspondance, 1862–1920 (in French). Paris: Société française de musicologie. ISBN 978-2-85-357004-6.
- Nichols, Roger (1977). Ravel. Master Musicians. London: Dent. ISBN 978-0-460-03146-2.
- Orenstein, Arbie (1991) [1975]. Ravel: Man and Musician. Mineola, US: Dover. ISBN 978-0-486-26633-6.
- Orledge, Robert (1979). Gabriel Fauré. London: Eulenburg Books. ISBN 0-903873-40-0.
- Smith, Rollin (2010). Saint-Saëns and the Organ. Stuyvesant, US: Pendragon. ISBN 978-1-57-647180-7.
