= Helga Schauerte-Maubouet =

German-French organist, musicologist, writer, music editor and academic teacher

Helga Schauerte
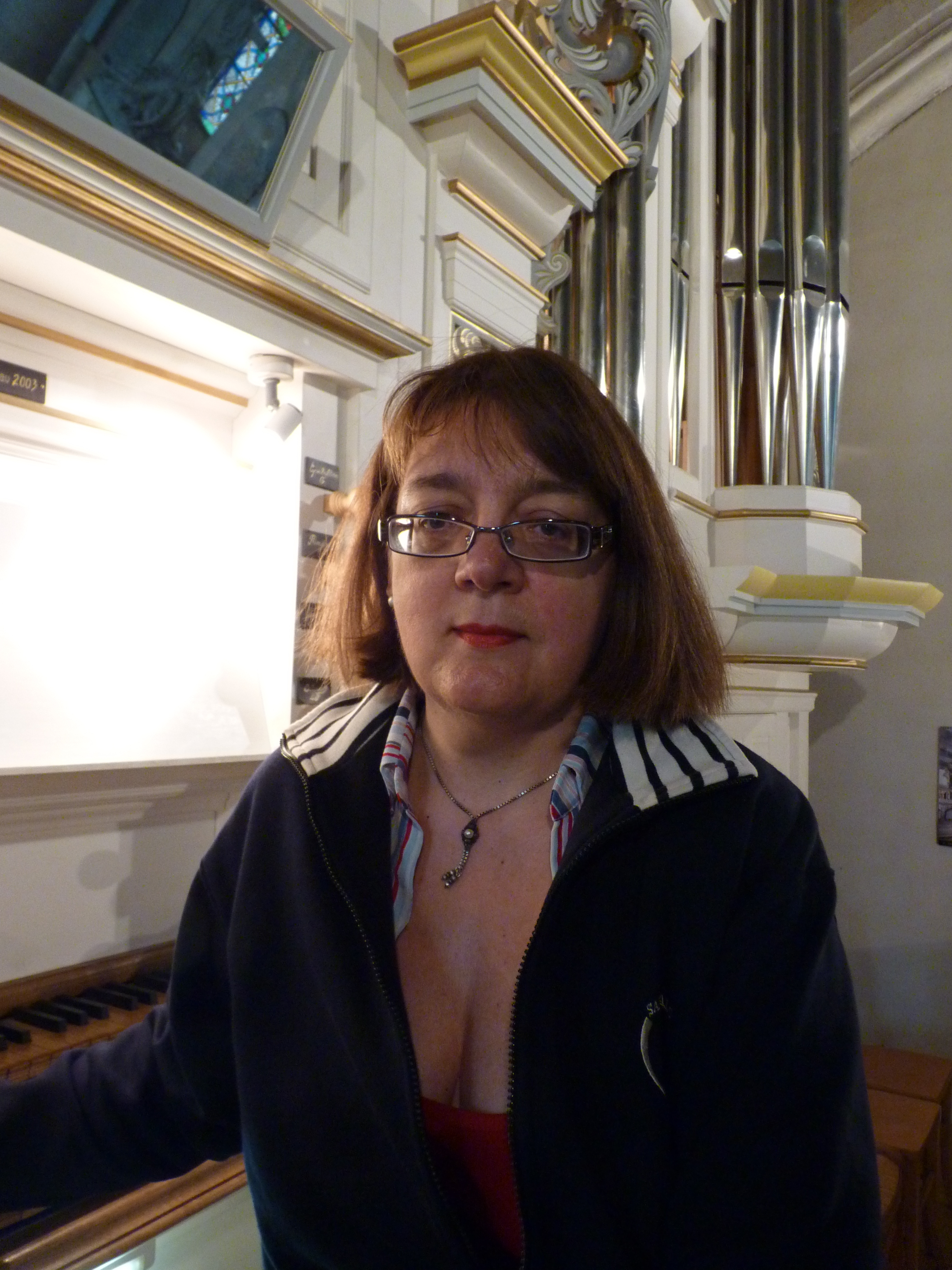
- Schauerte-Maubouet in Pontaumur in 2011
- Born: 8 March 1957 (age 68); Lennestadt, Germany
- Occupations: Organist; Musicologist; Music editor; Academic teacher
- Organizations: Christuskirche, Paris; Bärenreiter
- Awards: Order of Merit of the Federal Republic of Germany; Order of Arts and Letters

Helga Schauerte-Maubouet (born 8 March 1957) is a German-French organist, musicologist, writer, music editor and academic teacher. Based at the Christuskirche, Paris, she has recorded the complete organ works of Jehan Alain, Dietrich Buxtehude, and J. S. Bach, as well as portraits of composers Buttstett, Corrette, Reger, Boëllmann, Dubois and Langlais. She has worked as a concert organist in Europe and throughout the US. She has taught at the Conservatoire Nadia et Lili Boulanger in Paris.

== Life and work ==
Helga Schauerte was born in Lennestadt. She made her first public appearance at age ten. From age 13 she worked as organist in Lennestadt. She studied with Viktor Lukas in Cologne, graduating in music, pedagogy and philosophy, and studied music further in Paris with Marie-Claire Alain, completing with a Premier Prix. She is the organist of the German church in Paris, Christuskirche. She played world premieres of music by Jean Langlais, with Miniature II dedicated to her.

Her career has been influenced by German and French music. She founded a Bach-organ-academy in Pontaumur (Auvergne, France) in 2006. She wrote the first book in German on Jehan Alain's music, and acquired some forty of this composer's musical autographs. She has taught at the Conservatoire Nadia et Lili Boulanger in Paris. She is also lecturer and jury member for international organ competitions.

She has been engaged by Bärenreiter to contribute to the new edition of Die Musik in Geschichte und Gegenwart (MGG), to write on French organ music subjects in the Handbuch Orgelmusik, and to publish scholarly critical editions of the complete organ works of Léon Boëllmann, Théodore Dubois, Louis Vierne and Jehan Alain as well as of vocal music of Marc-Antoine Charpentier. She has also composed French Noël and German carol settings for other instruments and organ published by Merseburger Verlag.

In 1987 she was awarded the cultural prize of Olpe, Germany. She was awarded the Order of Merit of the Federal Republic of Germany and received the distinction of Chevalier in the Order of Arts and Letters from the French Cultural Minister.

== Recordings ==
Schauerte-Maubouet recorded around 30 albums, including:

Complete organ works

- Jehan Alain : 2 volumes (Motette, 11311 /11301) 1990
- Dietrich Buxtehude : 5 volumes, Syrius (SYR 141.347/348/359/366/371), 2000-2002
- Johann Sebastian Bach : (under way) (Syrius, 12 volumes published in 2018)

Portraits of organs and composers

- Die Passauer Domorgel : Les plus grandes orgues d'église du monde, at St. Stephen's Cathedral, Passau (Syrius,141310) 1995
- Max Reger : œuvre d'orgue pour le temps de Noël (Syrius,141320) 1997
- Johann Heinrich Buttstett (Syrius,141334) 1998
- Jean Langlais (Ambiente, ACD 9801) 1998
- Léon Boëllmann (Syrius, 141374) 2003
- Théodore Dubois (Syrius, 141382) 2004
- Louis-Nicolas Clérambault, Nicolas Séjan, Jean-François Dandrieu, at the organ of Saint-Calais (Sarthe) (Syrius, 141396) 2005
- Michel Corrette, André Raison, Jacques-Marie Beauvarlet-Charpentier, Louis Marchand, Orgue historique de La Flèche (Sarthe) (Syrius, 141408) 2006
- Johann Sebastian Bach and his time, historic organs in the district of Olpe
- Organum Antiquum, early organ music until Johann Sebastian Bach (Syrius, 141459) 2012

== Music editor ==
Schauerte-Maubouet prepared critical editions of musical works for Bärenreiter:

Complete organ Works

- 2002 - 2004 Léon Boëllmann, 4 volumes (BA 8424/8425/8462/8463/8464/8465)
- 2005 - 2007 Théodore Dubois, 6 volumes (BA 8468 to BA 8471, BA 9208/9209)
- 2008 - 2013 Louis Vierne, 10 volumes (BA 9221 to BA 9238)
- 2011 Jehan Alain, 3 volumes (BA 8428 to BA 8430)

Complete piano works

- 2008 Louis Vierne, Complete Piano Works, Vol. III (BA 9613)

Choir and orchestra

- 2004 Marc-Antoine Charpentier, Te Deum H.146, 5th edition in 2018 (BA 7593)
- 2004 Charpentier, Messe de Minuit H.9 (BA 7592)
- 2005 Charpentier, Te Deum H.148 (BA 7591)
- 2020 Gabriel Fauré, Œuvres complètes, Série I, vol. 4: Musique vocale religieuse pour voix, orgue et instruments (BA 9478-01)

== Publications ==
- Jehan Alain (1911–1940), das Orgelwerk (= Kölner Beiträge zur Musikforschung, 137). Bosse, Regensburg, 1983, ISBN 3-7649-2289-3.
- Jehan Alain, mourir à trente ans. Delatour, Sampzon, 2020, ISBN 978-2-7521-0399-4, translated into English by Carolyn Shuster Fournier and Connie Glessner: Jehan Alain, Understanding His Musical Genius, Delatour France, Sampzon, 2022
