= Les Deux Pigeons (ballet) =

1886 ballet by Louis Mérante and André Messager

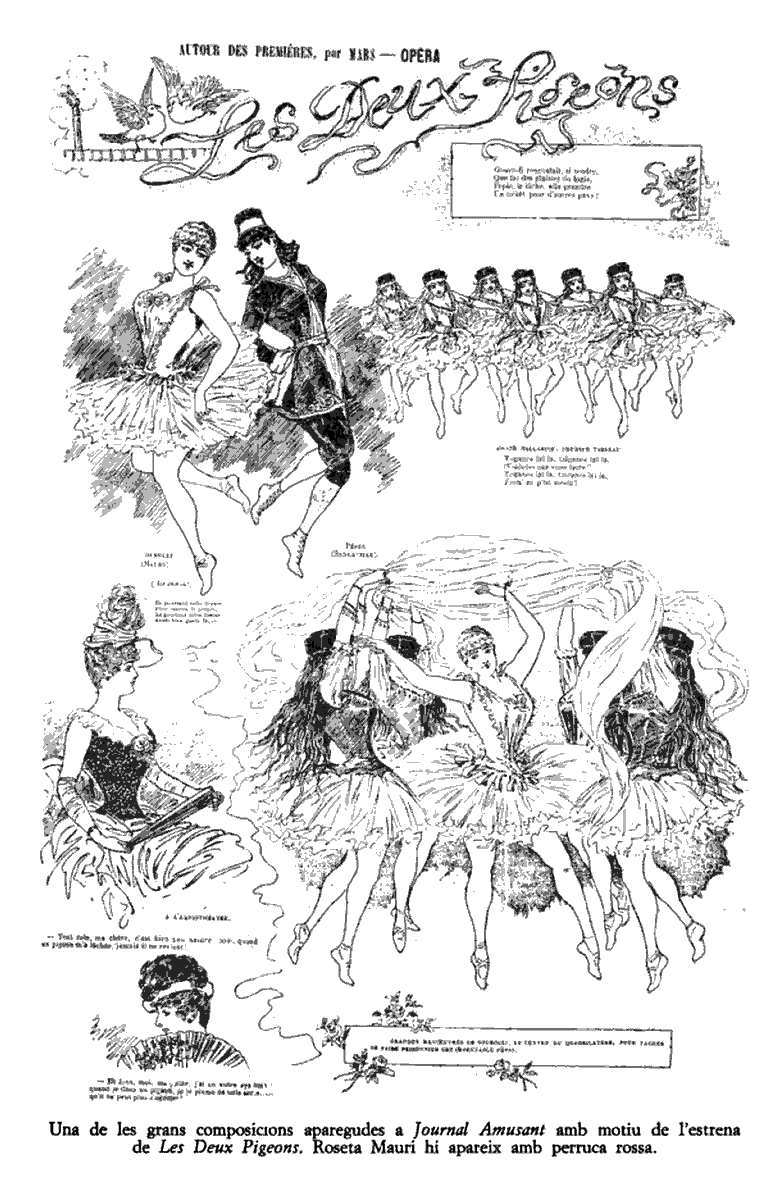
- Sketches of the original ballet that appeared in the Paris Journal Amusant
- Choreographer: Louis Mérante
- Music: André Messager
- Based on: The Two Pigeons by Jean de La Fontaine
- Premiere: 18 October 1886; Paris Opéra

Les Deux Pigeons is a ballet originally choreographed in two acts by Louis Mérante to music by André Messager. The libretto by Mérante and Henri de Régnier is based on the fable The Two Pigeons by Jean de La Fontaine. The work was first performed at the Paris Opéra on 18 October 1886. The premiere cast included Rosita Mauri as Gourouli and Marie Sanlaville as Pépio.

Frederick Ashton later created a new ballet to Messager's music under the title The Two Pigeons.

== Background ==
The score is dedicated to Camille Saint-Saëns, whose influence helped gain Messager the commission for the ballet, following three ballets which the younger composer had written for the Folies Bergère, Fleur d’oranger, Vins de France and Odeurs et Parfums. Les Deux pigeons was first performed on the same evening as a performance of La Favorite.

Messager introduced the ballet to London in 1906, with choreography by François Ambroisiny and a shortened score by Messager himself, who also conducted. He used this shortened version when the piece was revived at the Paris Opéra in 1912, and it was published as a final version. A one-act version was choreographed by Albert Aveline at the Opéra in 1919 and it was not until 1942 that the role of Pépio was finally danced by a man.

The discovery of the shortened score used at Covent Garden prompted Ashton to make his own version of the ballet, set in Paris at the time of the music's composition. As the 1912 version didn't provide a return to the opening scene at the end, John Lanchbery constructed a closing reconciliation scene from earlier music and a passage from Messager's operetta Véronique, as well as revising the orchestration in favour of a richer sound.

Ashton's version in two acts was premiered on 14 February 1961 at the Royal Opera House Covent Garden, with Lynn Seymour and Christopher Gable. As well as being performed regularly by the Royal Ballet touring company, the ballet has also been staged by several other dance companies around the world, including in 1983 Houston Ballet, as well as by other companies CAPAB and Australian Ballet.

== The plot ==
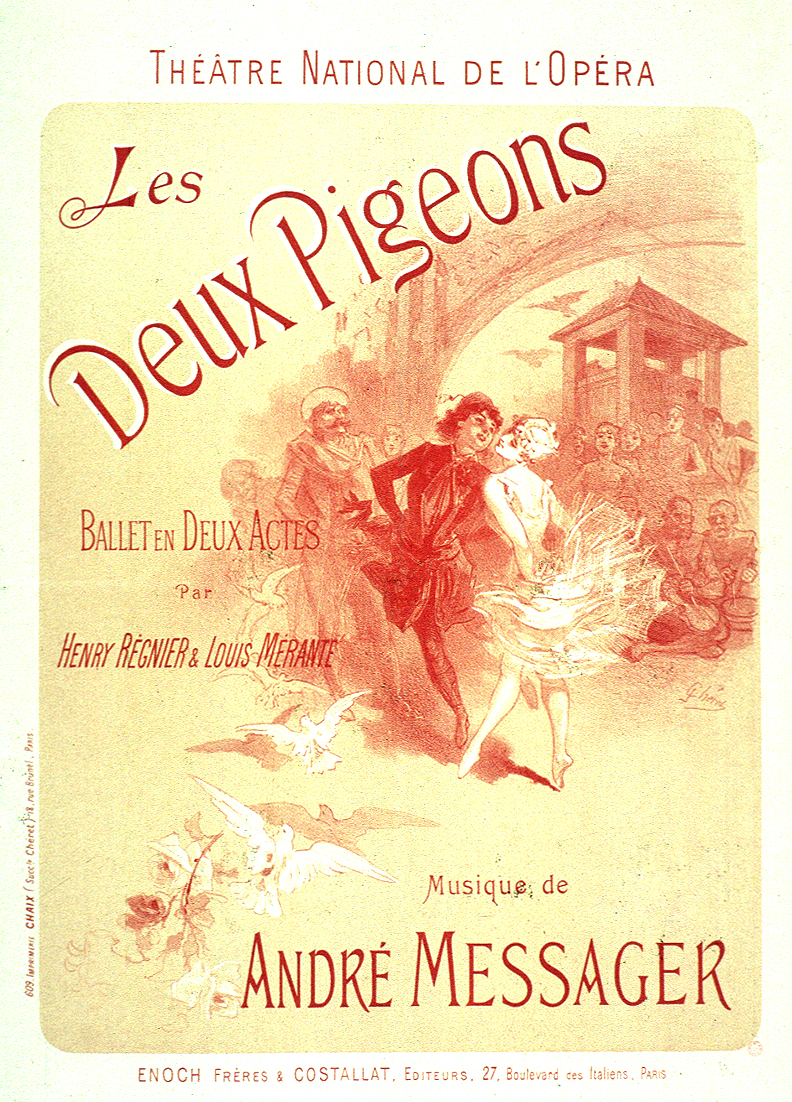
Jules Chéret's poster for the two-act production

In the original scenario, set in 18th-century Thessaly, the hero Pépio (danced then by a woman) is discontented with life at home and with the company of his fiancée Gourouli. Their relationship is symbolised by their pas de deux at the start in imitation of two pigeons they have been observing, quarrelling with small irritated movements of the head and then coming together to make up. When a group of gypsies visit their village, Pépio is seduced by the energetic czardas that they dance and flirts with the dusky Djali, eventually leaving his love behind to join in their wanderings. Gourouli's grandmother advises her to follow him disguised as a gypsy, thus providing the ballerina with a dual role. In the first act she had appeared in a pink wig; in the scene at the camp Rosita Mauri danced with her own long black hair unbound and streaming about her. By such means, this elemental Gourouli makes all the men fall in love with her, and she bribes one of them to make Pépio's life miserable. When a storm breaks, the gypsies rob Pépio and flee. He returns home chastened and must ask for forgiveness.

Ashton's version of the ballet is set in Paris at the time of the music's composition with anonymous leading roles (Young Man and Young Girl). At the start, a French painter is revealed trying to paint a restless model, his lover, who is sitting on an ornate cast-iron chair. The session is interrupted by the entry of the model's friends and his responsiveness to other female company underlines his restless spirit. A troupe of gypsies that he sees through the garret window, misunderstanding a gesture of his, now crowd in and a quarrel develops over possession of the chair between the model and a hot-blooded Carmen with whom the painter is flirting. Perceiving that they are not welcome, the gypsy leader leaves the studio and the painter dashes off to join them, bewitched by their unfamiliar and seemingly exotic lifestyle. However, his intrusion into their community is resented and he is thrown out of the encampment. Returning to the lover he had left behind, they are reconciled and sit together on the ornate chair that has dominated the room.

Two live pigeons are used to represent the lovers; they have a theme of their own in the music. Seen together during the first act, while the artist and his lover dance together, the young man's dissatisfaction and temporary desertion of the girl are represented by one pigeon flying alone off stage before the interval. The painter's return in the next act is prompted by a pigeon coming to land on his shoulder. When the lovers are reunited both pigeons perch above them on the chair.

Premiere cast list:

- Gourouli – Rosita Mauri
- Pépio – Marie Sanlaville
- Gertrude – Mlle Montaubry
- Djali – Mlle Hirsch
- Reine des Tziganes – Mlle Monnier
- Zarifa – M. Pluque
- Franca-Trippa – M. de Soria
- Un tzigane – Louis Mérante
- Le capitaine – M. Ajas
- Un serviteur – M. Ponçot

== Recordings ==
In 1991 at the Brangwyn Hall, Swansea, the Orchestra of Welsh National Opera conducted by Richard Bonynge were recorded by Decca in Messager's 1906 score. John Lanchbery recorded his version of the ballet music for EMI in 1984 with the Bournemouth Symphony Orchestra.

A suite of movements from the ballet (Entrée des tziganes, Scène et pas de deux des pigeons, Thème et variations, Danse hongroise, Finale) has been recorded several times, for example by the Orchestre du Théâtre des Champs-Elysées conducted by Paul Bonneau (Ducretet Thomson – 255 C 087), Orchestre Colonne conducted by Jean Fournet (Pathe PDT135, 1947), the Orchestra of the Royal Opera House, Covent Garden conducted by Hugo Rignold (HMV, C3778-9, 1948), the orchestra of the Opéra-Comique, Paris conducted by Richard Blareau (Decca, LX3093, 1952) and the Orchestra of the Royal Opera House by Charles Mackerras (HMV, CLP1195, 1958).
