= Marie Sanlaville =

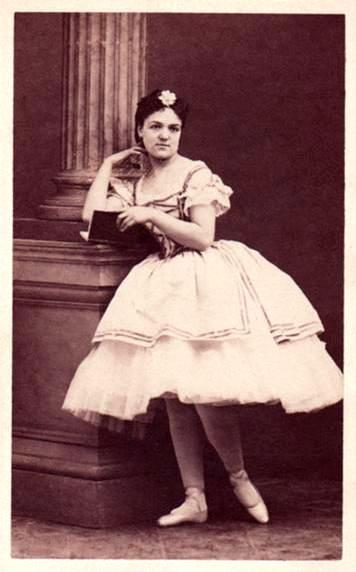
A photo of Marie Sanlaville at the height of her career

Marie Sanlaville (1847–1930) was a leading dancer with the Paris Opéra. She is particularly noted for her association with the artist Edgar Degas, who painted her often and dedicated a rare sonnet to her.

== Career ==
In a career spanning the years 1864–89, Marie Sanlaville was to become a principal ballerina at the Paris Opéra. Her speciality was playing male roles (en travesti), which was common at the period, and she eventually succeeded Eugénie Fiocre as the company’s foremost dancer in this capacity. As such she frequently starred with Rosita Mauri, the Opéra's main female lead. She was described by one contemporary as one of the most charming and spirited performers there and another noted that she could dance a role after a single rehearsal. Among her principal roles were the part of the goblin Zail in Léo Delibes’ La Source (1866); of Eros in Sylvia (Délibes, 1876); of Pepio in Les Deux Pigeons (Messager, 1886); and of Harlequin Senior in the 1886 performance of Charles Lecocq's Les Jumeaux de Bergame.

Marie's connection with artists was long and sustained. She was the mistress of the American painter Julius LeBlanc Stewart and later of Count Ludovic-Napoléon Lepic, for whom she cared in his final illness. The latter was an artist formerly on the fringes of Impressionism and a friend of Degas. Through Degas and his connection with the ballet, for which Lepic later designed costumes, he came to know Rosita Mauri and Marie, both of whom posed for him. At one particular session in 1881 he was joined by Pierre-Georges Jeanniot and the Spanish painter Adolfo Guiard. While Mauri and Sanlaville sat for their heads, the two apprentices by whom they were accompanied modelled the ballet poses. One of the fruits of this sitting was the picture of Marie in the role of Fanella that was published in the magazine La Vie Moderne in February 1882.

Guiard also painted a portrait of Marie sitting with a book in her lap which may be intended to underline the intelligence for which she was noted. A photo of that period also pictures her holding a book. There are other pictures of her by Degas. One is a pastel of her seated and holding an umbrella; another is of her in performance in Two dancers on the stage (c.1874). In addition Degas made seven sketches of her rehearsing Les Jumeaux de Bergame in 1885. From this session he was eventually to model the sculpture now known as Dancer rubbing her knee. The figure in the pastel on which it is based wears Harlequin's domino costume and carries a slapstick in her right hand. Degas depicts the moment in which the dancer in the role of Harlequin Senior, poised with her feet planted in fourth position, is about to pantomime her discovery that the lout she has just attacked with a baton is her brother, Harlequin Junior.

Yet another result of this session was the sonnet that Degas dedicated to her in the series of eight by him that have been preserved.

All that the fine discourse of dumb-show says,
And all the agile and deceitful tongue
Of ballet, to those who pierce the mystery
Of a body's silently eloquent movement,
Stubbornly seeking in a woman who flees
Forever, painted, harlequin, severe,
The gliding trace of their soul in passage,
More alive than the turning of a favorite page,
All of that, and a sketch's skilful grace,
A dancer has, askance as Atalanta:
A serene tradition, hidden to fools.
Obscured in the woods, your endless art awaits:
Via doubt, a step's oblivion, I dream of you,
And you've caught the ear of an ancient faun.

In this complex poem Degas references some of Marie's former roles, including those of Eros and Harlequin. But he also engages with Stéphane Mallarmé's theorising about the role of the dancer, particularly in the essay Ballets (1888) that appeared at the time Degas was writing. In the final line he characterises himself in the role of the faun in Mallarmé's L'après-midi d'un faune.

Marie Sanlaville long outlived her friends and admirers. In 1897 she married Georges Vibert, who died in 1902, and was buried in his tomb in Père Lachaise Cemetery on her own death in 1930.
