= Quartier Saint-Georges =

Coordinates: 48.87852478027344°N 2.337543249130249°E

Saint-Georges
- Quartier Saint-Georges
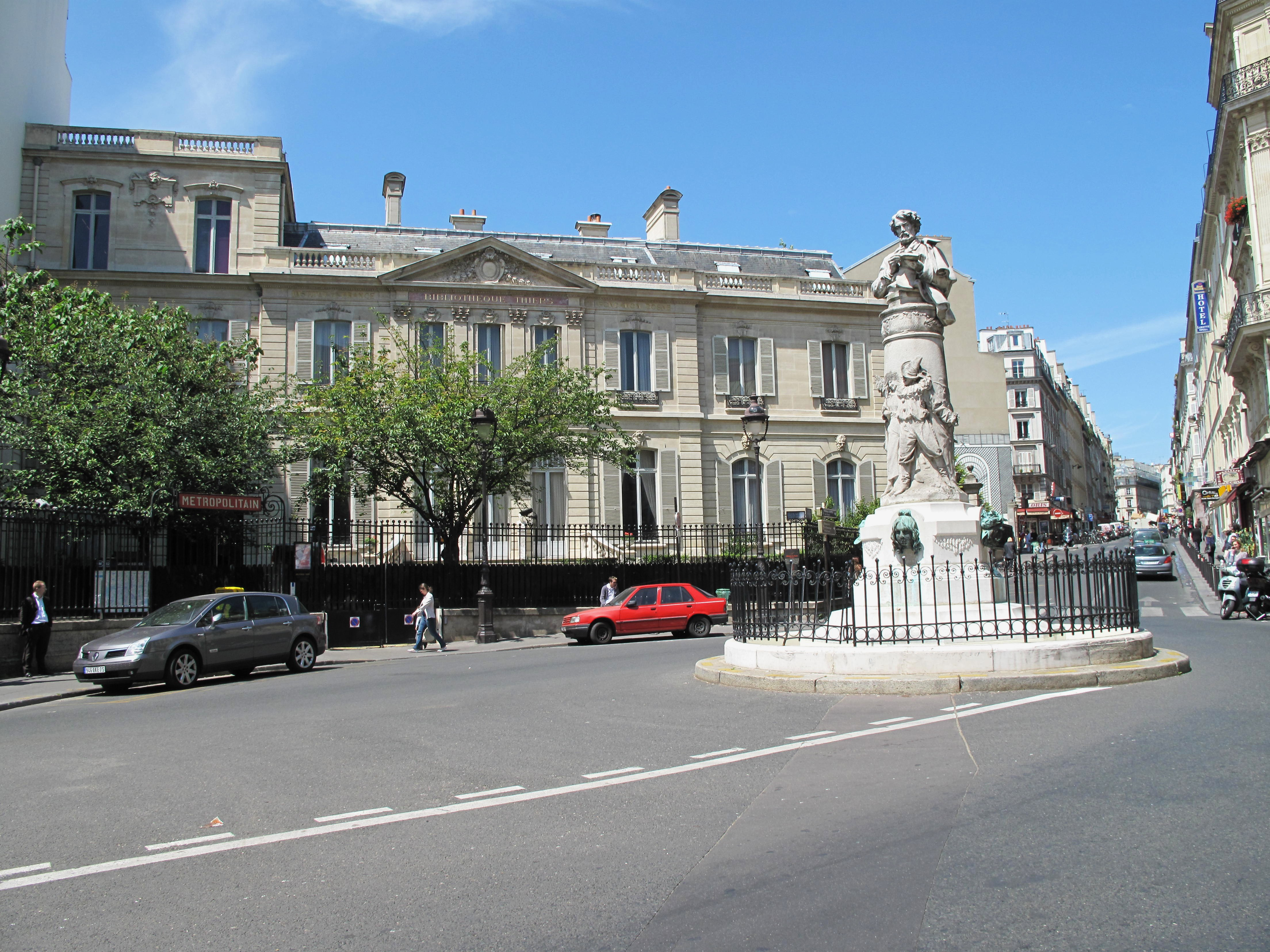
- Place Saint-Georges
- Interactive map of Saint-Georges
- Country: France
- Region: Île-de-France
- Ville: Paris
- Arrondissement: 9th

Area
  - Total: 0.717 km^{2} (0.277 sq mi)

Population (2021)
  - Total: 21,354
  - Density: 29,782/km^{2} (77,140/sq mi)

The Quartier Saint-Georges is the 33rd of the 80 quarters of Paris, located in the 9th arrondissement.

== Location ==
The administrative district located in the 9th arrondissement of Paris is bounded by the following streets:

- West: Rue d’Amsterdam
- North: Boulevard de Clichy
- East: Rue des Martyrs
- South: Rue Saint-Lazare

== Origin of the name ==
The quarters in the 9th arrondissement

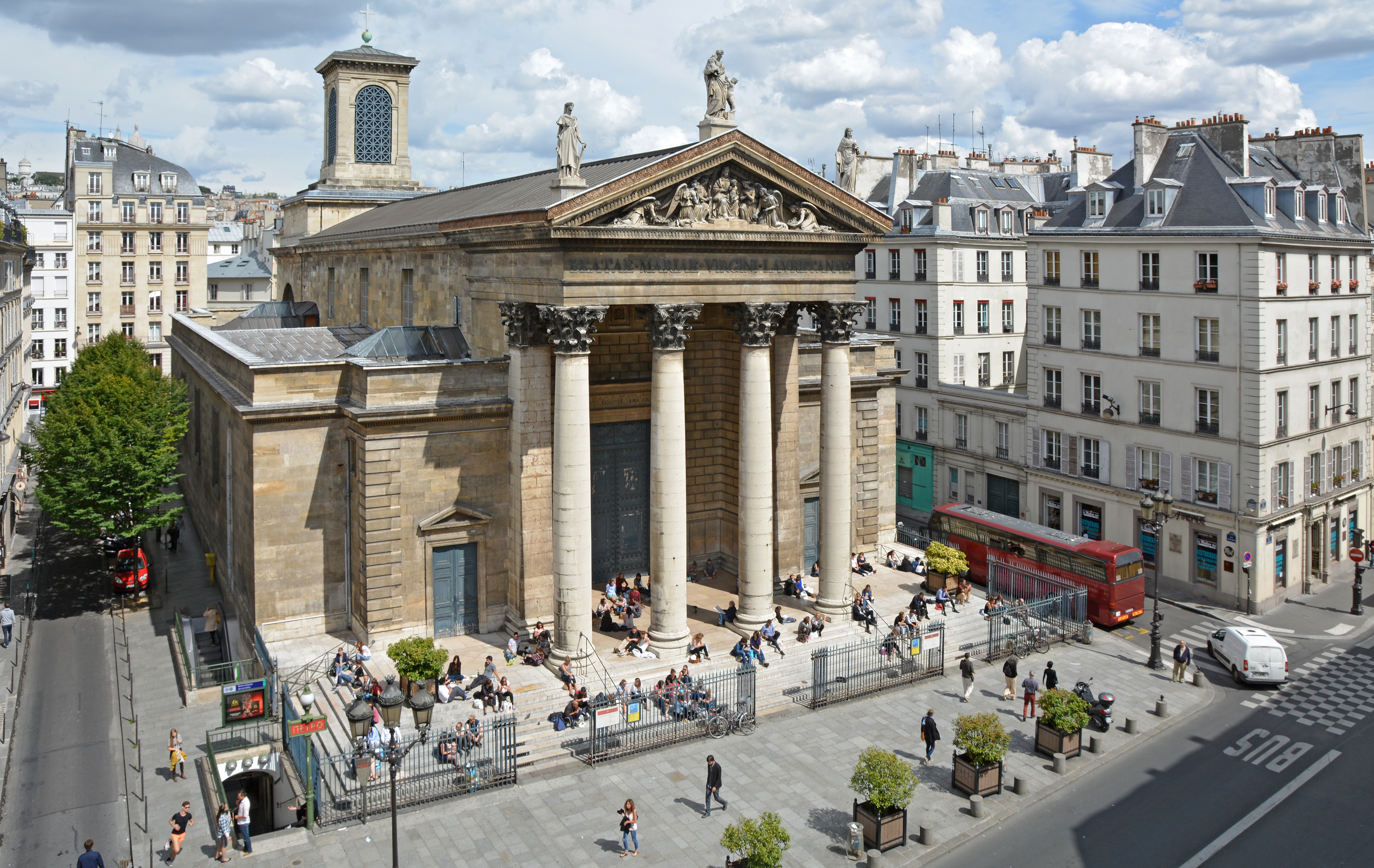
Notre-Dame-de-Lorette de Paris

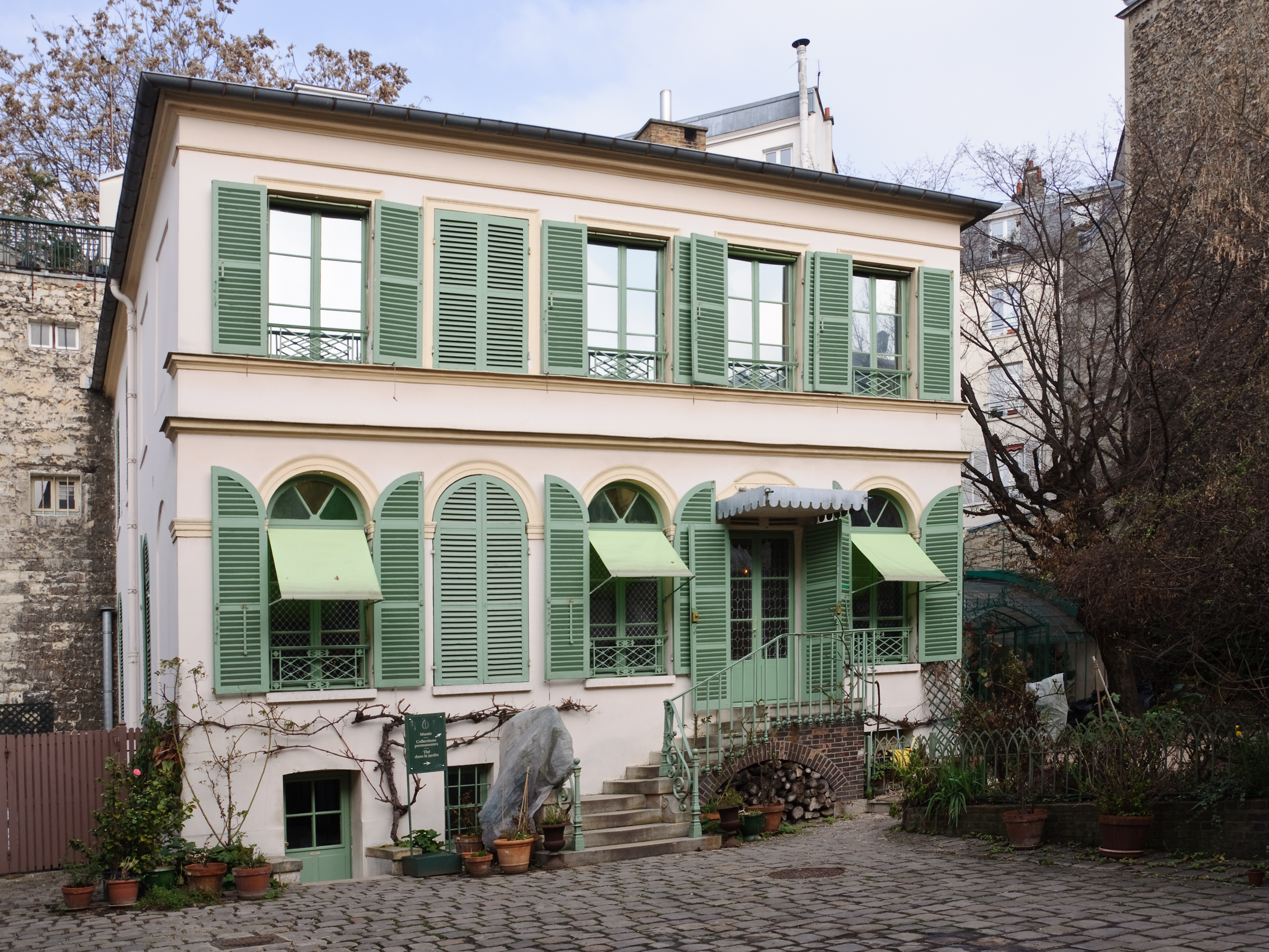
Musée de la Vie romantique

The district was named in honor of Saint George, likely because the Rue Saint-Georges and the Place Saint-Georges are also located here.

== Sightseeing features ==
=== Facilities worth seeing ===
- Place Saint Georges
- Square d'Orléans
- Cité Malesherbes

=== Sacred buildings ===
- Sainte-Trinité, Paris
- Notre-Dame-de-Lorette, Paris
- Christuskirche, Paris
- Chapelle Sainte Rita

=== Museums ===
- Musée national Gustave Moreau
- Musée de la Vie romantique

=== Theater ===
- Théâtre Saint-Georges
- Théâtre de Paris
- Théâtre de l'Œuvre
- Théâtre La Bruyère
- La Petite Loge
- Théâtre Fontaine
- Casino de Paris
- Comédie de Paris
- Bus Palladium
