= Johann Heinrich Buttstett =

German organist and composer (1666–1727)

- Born: 25 April 1666
- Died: December 1, 1727 (aged 61)
- Genres: Baroque
- Occupation: Composer
- Instrument: Organ

Johann Heinrich Buttstett (also Buttstedt, Buttstädt) (25 April 1666 – December 1, 1727) was a German Baroque organist and composer. Although he was Johann Pachelbel's most important pupil and one of the last major exponents of the south German organ tradition, Buttstett is best remembered for a dispute with Johann Mattheson.

== Life ==
Buttstett was born in Bindersleben (now part of Erfurt) into the family of Johann Henricus Buttstett, a well-educated local pastor who had studied at the University of Erfurt. He began studying music at an early age, becoming a pupil of Johann Pachelbel, then organist of Erfurt's Predigerkirche, in 1678. His professional career began in 1684 at the Reglerkirche and continued at the Kaufmannskirche, where he was working in 1687. In both cases, he was not only the church organist but also teaching in church schools. In 1691, Buttstett succeeded Nicolaus Vetter at the Predigerkirche (Pachelbel quit in 1690 and Vetter, who succeeded him, moved to Rudolstadt in 1691); he remained there until his death 36 years later. Buttstett married Martha Lämmerhirt (a distant cousin of Johann Sebastian Bach's mother) in 1687 and had ten children with her.

In 1716, Buttstett published Ut, mi, sol, re, fa, la, tota musica et harmonia aeterna, a work directed against Johann Mattheson's first major treatise. Mattheson was a progressive thinker who embraced the coming of the Classical style and miscellaneous modern principles aimed at widespread music education (limited to teaching 18th century styles of French and Italian secular music), whereas Buttstett sought to defend the musical tradition of the past: from basic practical things like the use of solmization and composing with the Greek modes to the global concepts of music and harmony that were used during the past several centuries.

Buttstett was somewhat acclaimed as a teacher during his years at the Predigerkirche, surrounding himself with a circle of pupils. The most important composer to receive musical training from him was Johann Gottfried Walther.

He died in Erfurt aged 61.

== Works ==
Aside from a lost sacred opera, a fragment of a cantata and two concerted masses, all minor works, Buttstett's surviving output consists exclusively of keyboard music, which he apparently composed in great numbers. In the only surviving collection, Musicalische Clavier-Kunst und Vorraths-Kammer of 1713, he stated that he had more than a thousand pieces available in manuscript, such as fughettas, fantasias, large fugues and ricercars, capriccios, preludes and so on; but so far the said collection, two marches included in Ut, mi, sol.. and several dozen chorale preludes are the only extant keyboard works by him. Predictably, most pieces show the influence of Pachelbel; however, numerous signs indicate that Buttstett was more than familiar with the north German organ school - both his free (preludes, fantasias) and strict (fugues, ricercars) compositions may feature long virtuosic passages quite unlike Pachelbel's more relaxed writing, but very akin to Dieterich Buxtehude and Nicholas Bruhns. Particularly interesting are the Prelude & Capriccio in D minor of the Musicalische Clavier-Kunst: the prelude begins with a long single-voice monophonic passage filled with pauses, single note exclamations and virtuosic figures, and the Capriccio is fugal, building on a similarly complex subject written out in 32nd- and 16th-notes (and related to the prelude):

Musicalische Clavier-Kunst also contains a few dance suites, with obvious French influences and somewhat different from the typical German suite of the time.

A particularly interesting fugue by Buttstett is found in the so-called Andreas Bach manuscript. It features an extreme example of a repercussion subject, which includes a leap of a diminished 7th:

Repercussion is also used throughout the fugue, sometimes applied to full chords in both hands.

== Recordings (selection) ==
- Johann Heinrich Buttstett - Helga Schauerte-Maubouet at the Silbermann Organ in Rötha (Syrius, 141334), 1998
