= Rosnay, Marne =

Rosnay
- Commune
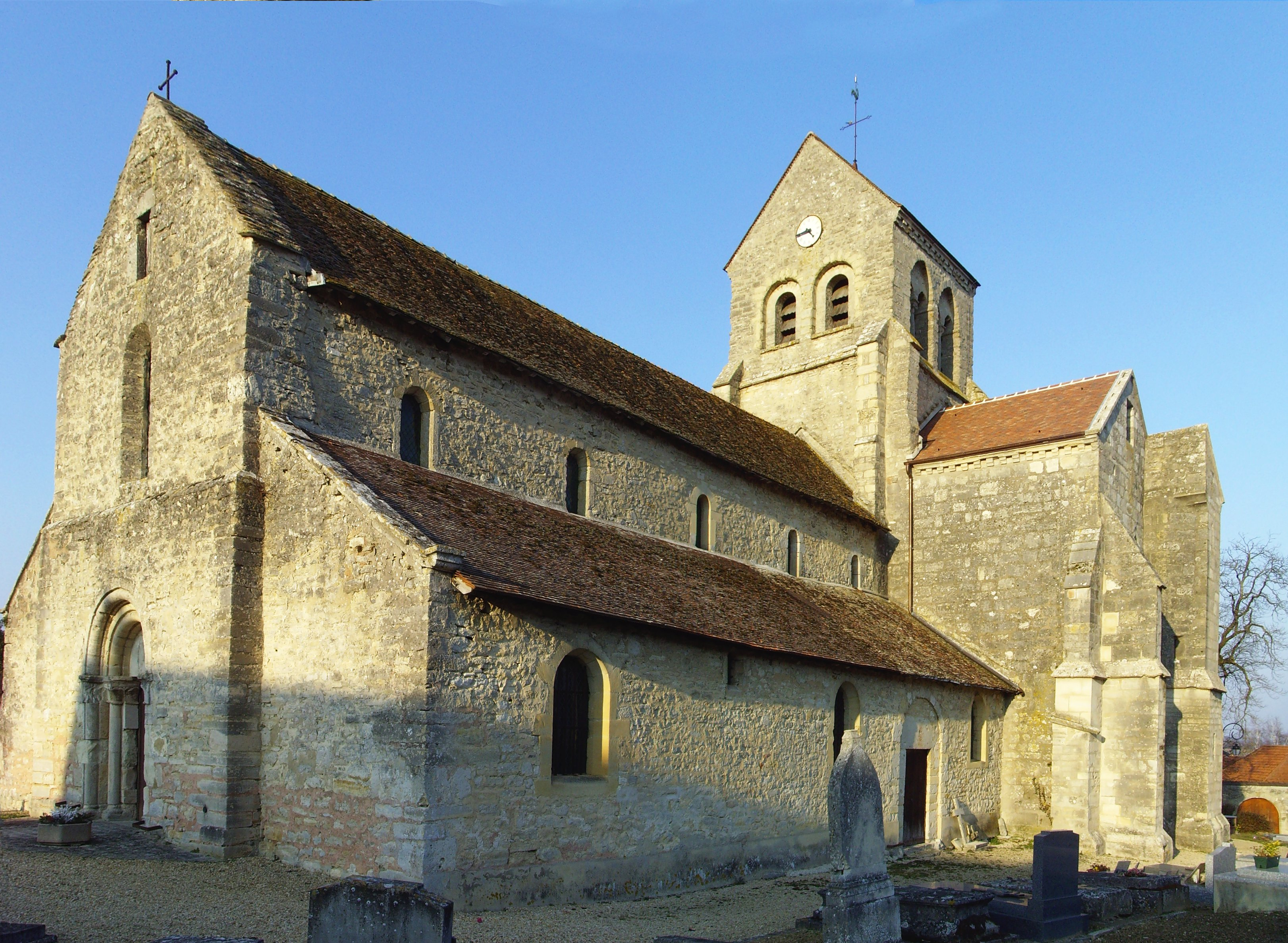
- The church in Rosnay
- Location of Rosnay
- Location within France Location within Grand Est
- Coordinates: 49°15′16″N 3°51′42″E
- Country: France
- Region: Grand Est
- Department: Marne
- Arrondissement: Reims
- Canton: Fismes-Montagne de Reims
- Intercommunality: CU Grand Reims

Government
  - Mayor (2020–2026): Nicolas Carnoye
- Area^{1}: 5.54 km^{2} (2.14 sq mi)
- Elevation: 143 m (469 ft)
- Population (2023): 423
  - Density: 76.4/km^{2} (198/sq mi)
- Time zone: UTC+01:00 (CET)
  - Summer (DST): UTC+02:00 (CEST)
- INSEE/Postal code: 51468 /51390
- ^{1} French Land Register data, which excludes lakes, ponds, glaciers > 1 km^{2} (0.386 sq mi or 247 acres) and river estuaries.

Rosnay (French pronunciation: [ʁonɛ]) is a commune in the Marne department in north-eastern France. The composer Théodore Dubois was a native of Rosnay.

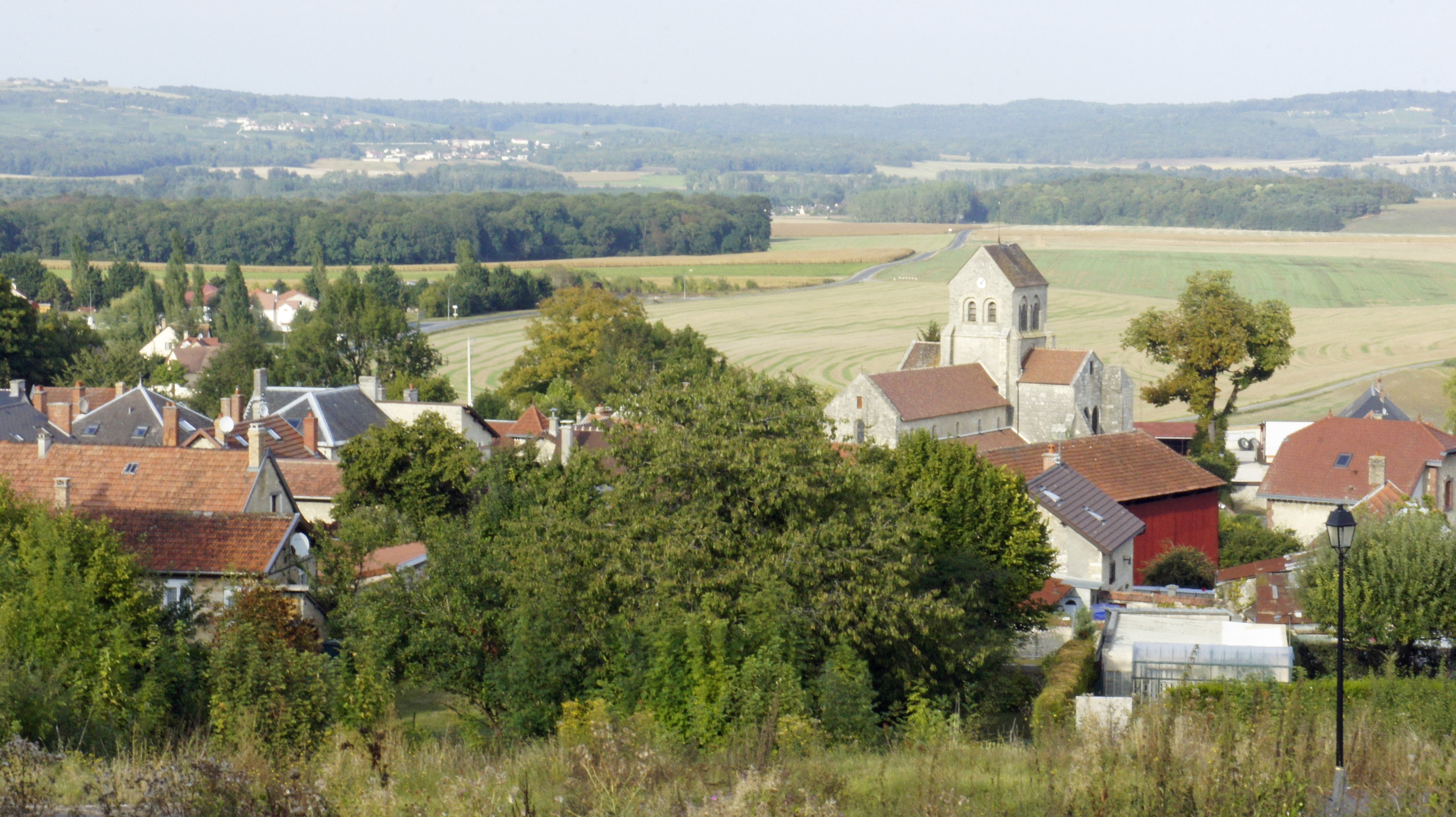

== See also ==
- Communes of the Marne department
