= Rosita Mauri =

Spanish dancer and ballet teacher

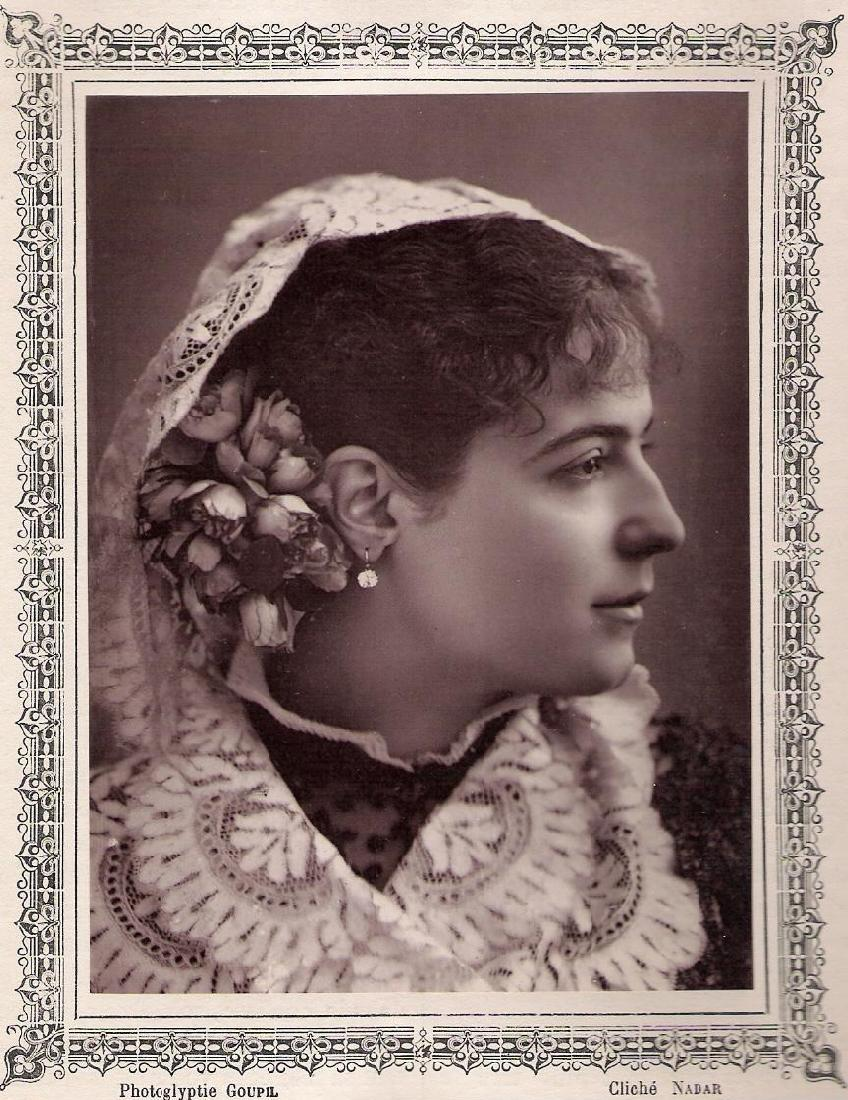
- Portrait head by Nadar, 1881
- Born: María Isabel Amada Antonia Rosa Mauri Segura; 15 November 1850; Palma de Mallorca
- Died: 3 December 1923 (aged 73); Paris, France
- Burial place: Montparnasse Cemetery
- Occupations: Dancer and ballet teacher

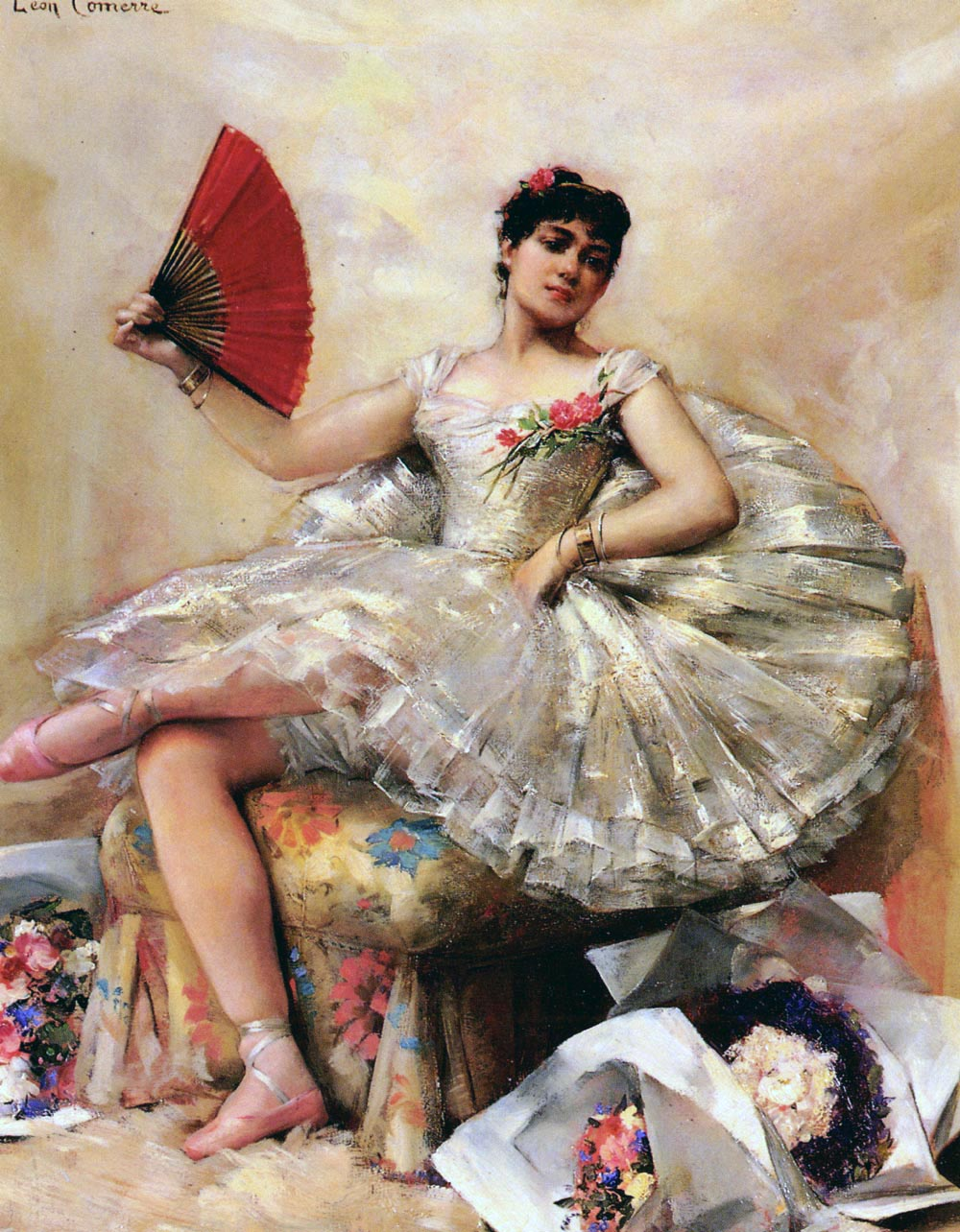
Léon Comerre's portrait of the ballerina

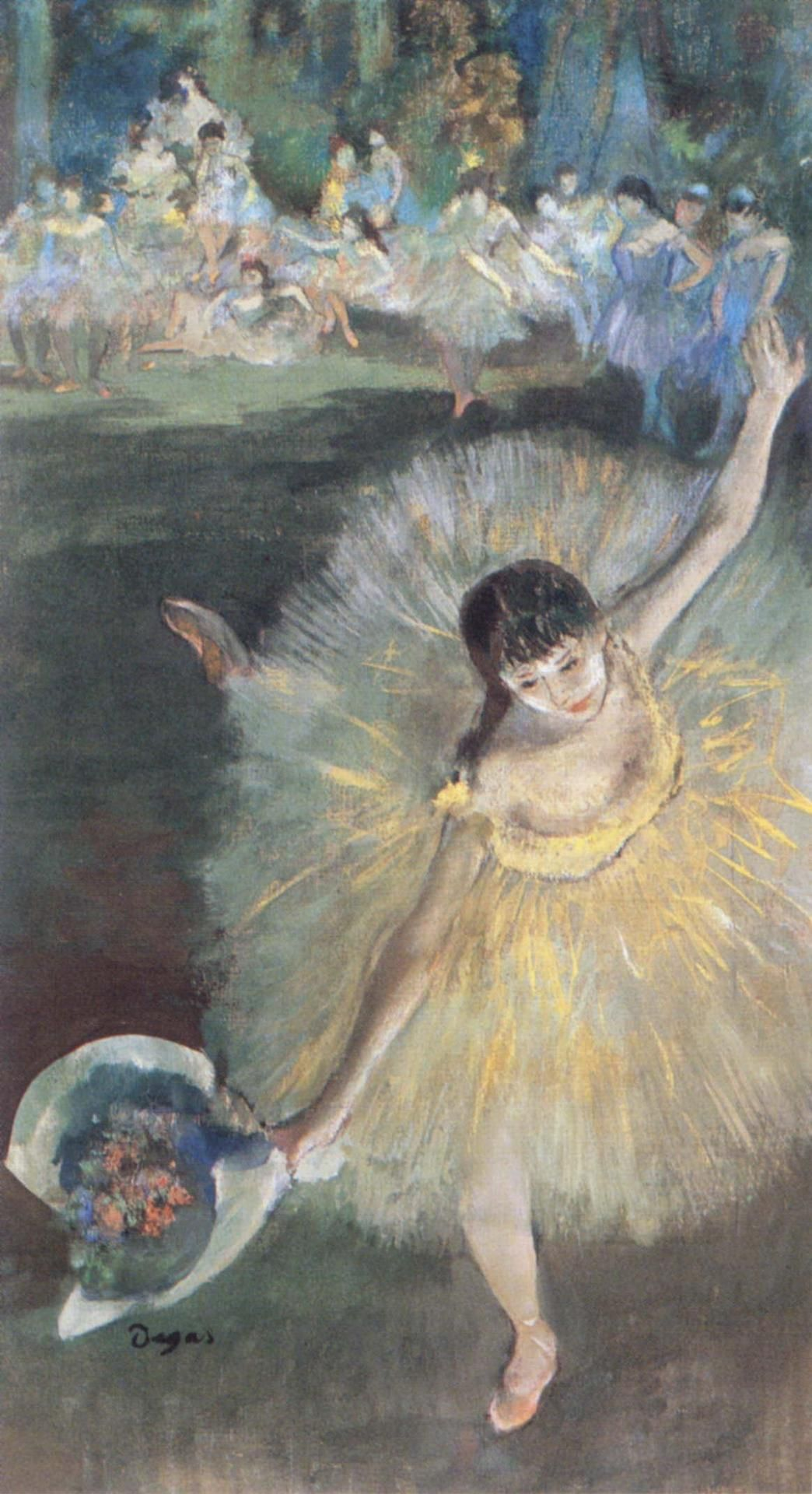
Fin d'arabesque (1877) by Edgar Degas

María Isabel Amada Antonia Rosa Mauri Segura or Roseta Mauri y Segura (15 September 1850 – 3 December 1923) was a Spanish dancer and ballet teacher. Her year of birth has also been quoted as between 1849 and 1856. A prima ballerina of international reputation, she was depicted frequently by artists, sculptors and photographers and was also the subject of several poetic tributes.

== Career ==
Rosita Mauri was the daughter of the Catalan ballet master and choreographer Pedro Rafael Jaime Mauri who, from her childhood, trained her for stardom. She was brought up in Reus, which has sometimes been claimed as her place of birth, and began her dancing career in 1865. Her rise to become one of Europe's principal ballerinas started in 1877, when the French composer Charles Gounod saw her dancing at La Scala, Milan. He then persuaded the Paris Opera to engage her and she premiered in Gounod's Polyeucte the following year. After she retired from full-time dancing, she taught future generations of dancers at the Ballet d’Opera's ‘Class of perfection’ between 1898 and 1920. On her death in 1923, she was buried in the Montparnasse cemetery, the name on her grave being given as Isabel Amada Rosita. The Rosita Mauri Academy of Dance in Barcelona was named after her in 1978 and her home town of Reus has hosted an international dance competition in her name since 2002.

Because of her warm nature, Rosita Mauri was a favourite in artistic circles. The poet François Coppée created for her the very popular ballet La Korrigane (The Goblin Maiden), first performed in 1880 with music by Charles-Marie Widor and choreography by Louis Mérante. He was followed in 1885 by Jules Massenet, who created the ballet in his opera El Cid (1885) especially for her. After seeing her performing with her long black hair loose in the lead role of André Messager's Les Deux Pigeons the following year, the poet Stéphane Mallarmé wrote how impressed he was by her ritualised animality (sa divination mêlée d’animalité).

She was frequently portrayed by artists. Edgar Degas painted her several times onstage: Fin d'arabesque (1877); Danseuse sur la scène (1878); Ballet vu d'une loge de l'Òpera (1885). Others included Édouard Manet (Portrait of Rosita Mauri 1877/9, also known as Jeune femme en rose), Auguste Renoir, Léon Bonnat, Léon Comerre, Anders Zorn (a portrait in 1888 and an etching in 1889), and Ludovic-Napoléon Lepic. She was also sculpted by Denys Puech, Laurent Marqueste, and Eusebi Arnau. The photographer Nadar made portraits of her throughout her career.

Another side of her artistic temperament was her quick temper. There is an anecdote that she refused to eat caviar because the tsar had turned to talk to a companion during one of her performances. Another rumoured to have suffered on her account was the French politician Antonin Proust, who had formerly studied art with his childhood friend Édouard Manet and was for a short period Minister for the Arts (1881-2). In March 1905 he shot himself two days after dining with Rosita Mauri, according to some papers as a result of quarreling with her.

== Gallery ==
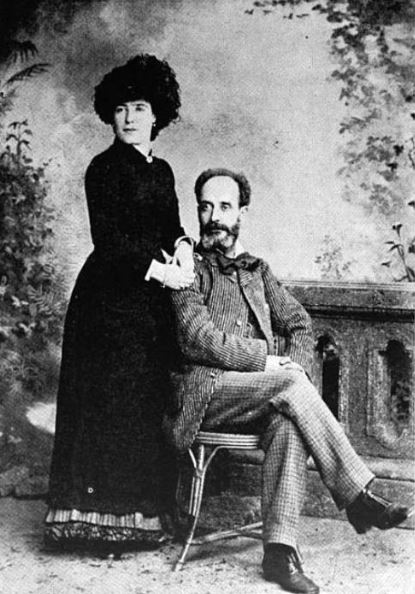
Rosita Mauri with her father

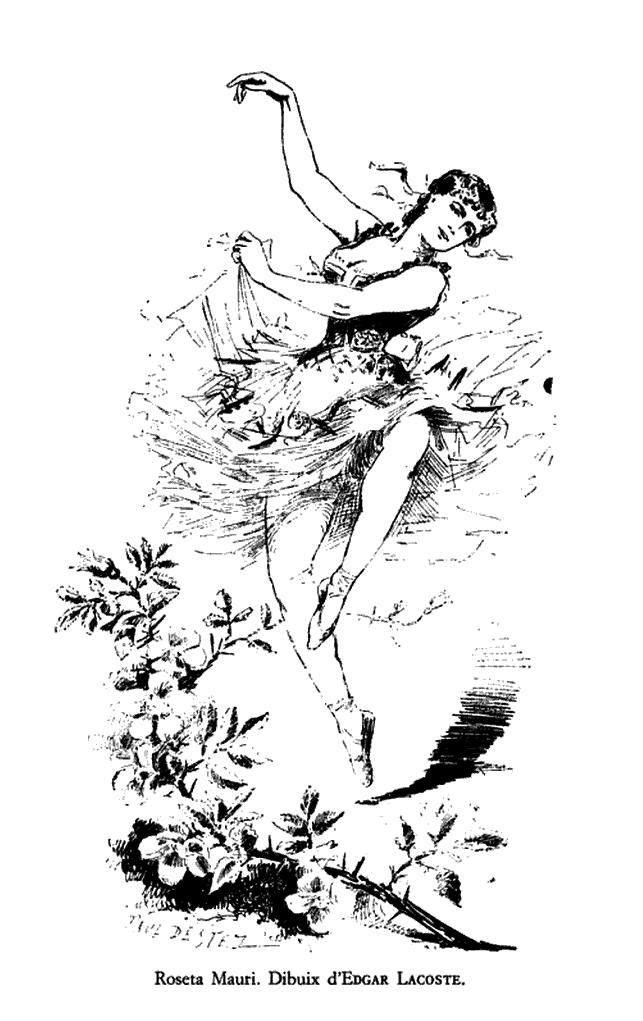
A drawing by Edgar Lacoste, July 1875

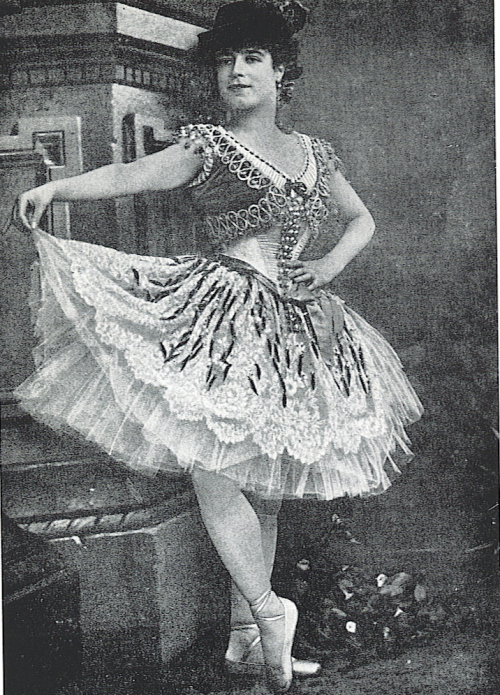
Dancing in Le Cid, Act 2, 1885

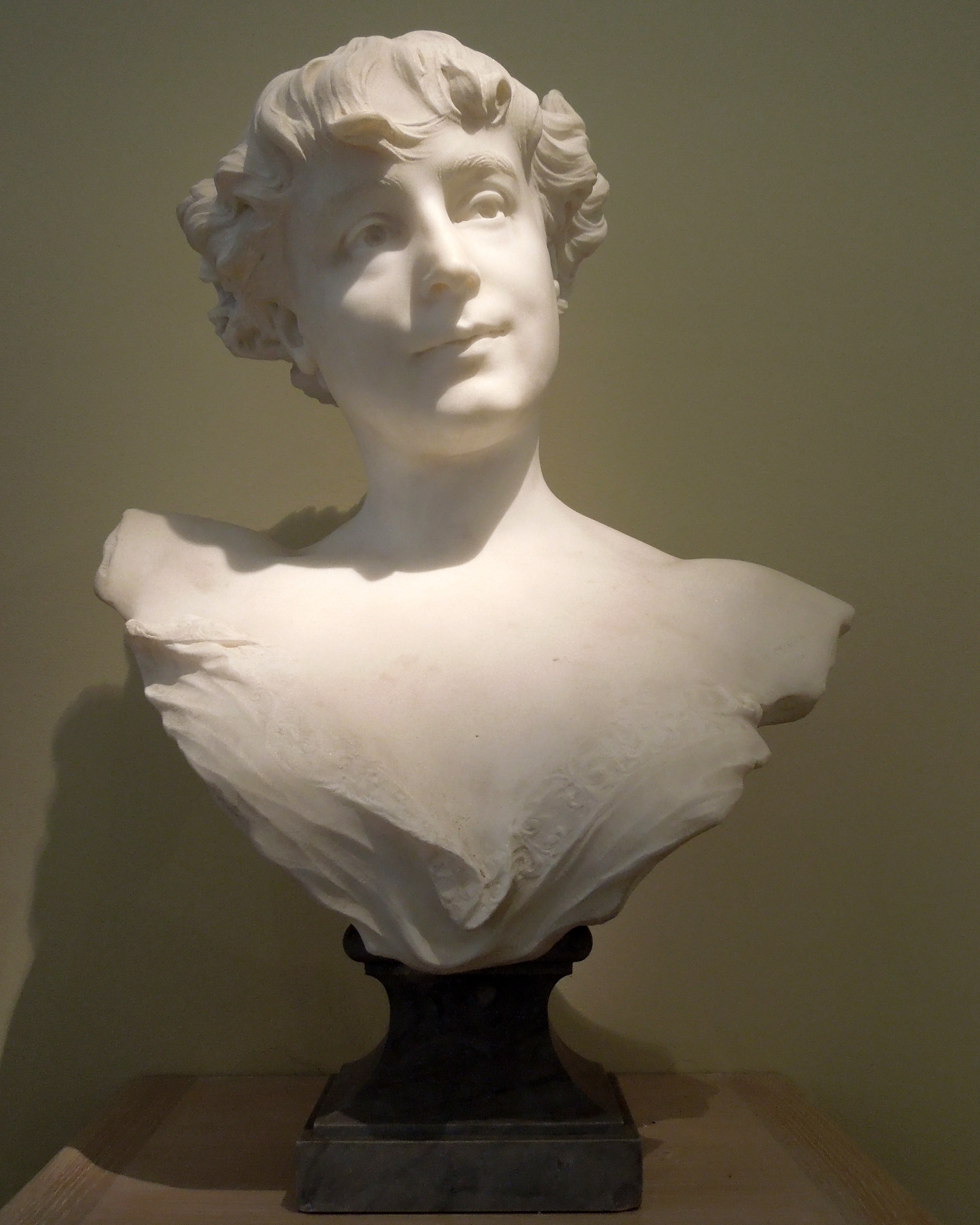
A head by Denys Puech, 1900

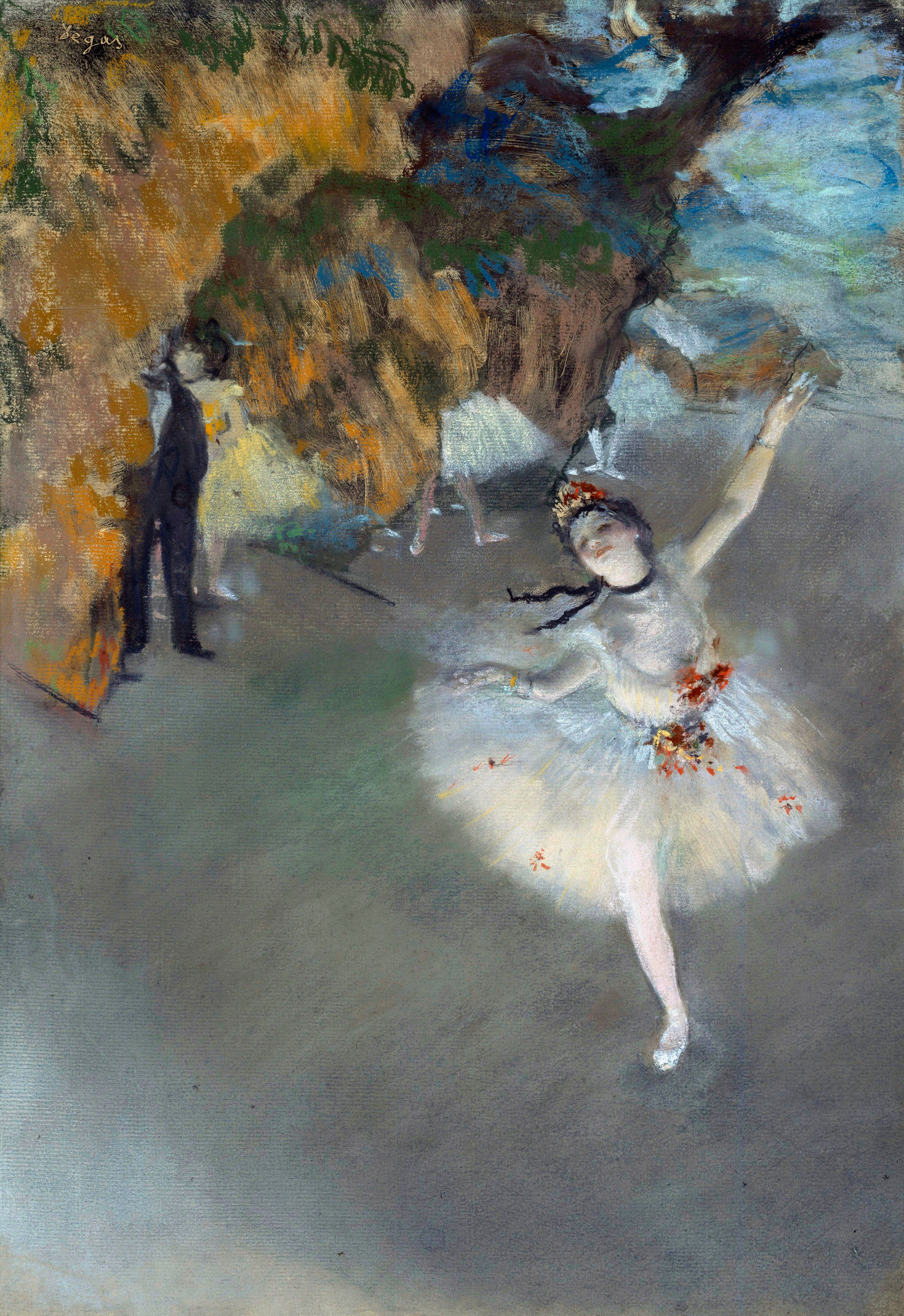
Prima ballerina by Degas, 1878

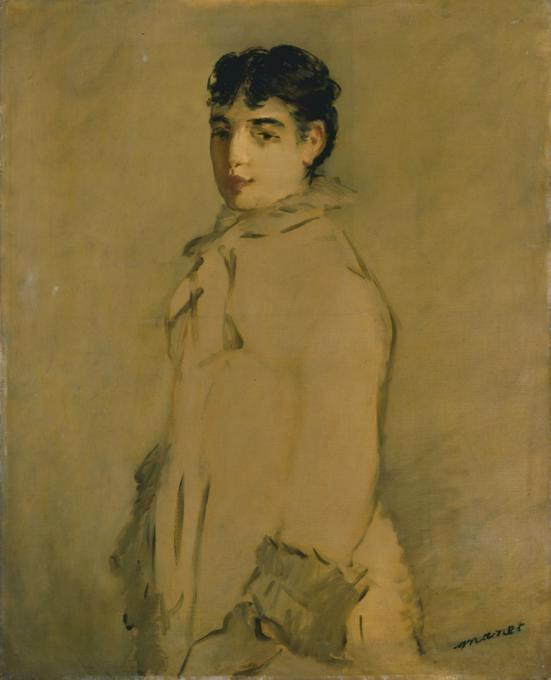
Manet's Jeune femme en rose, 1880

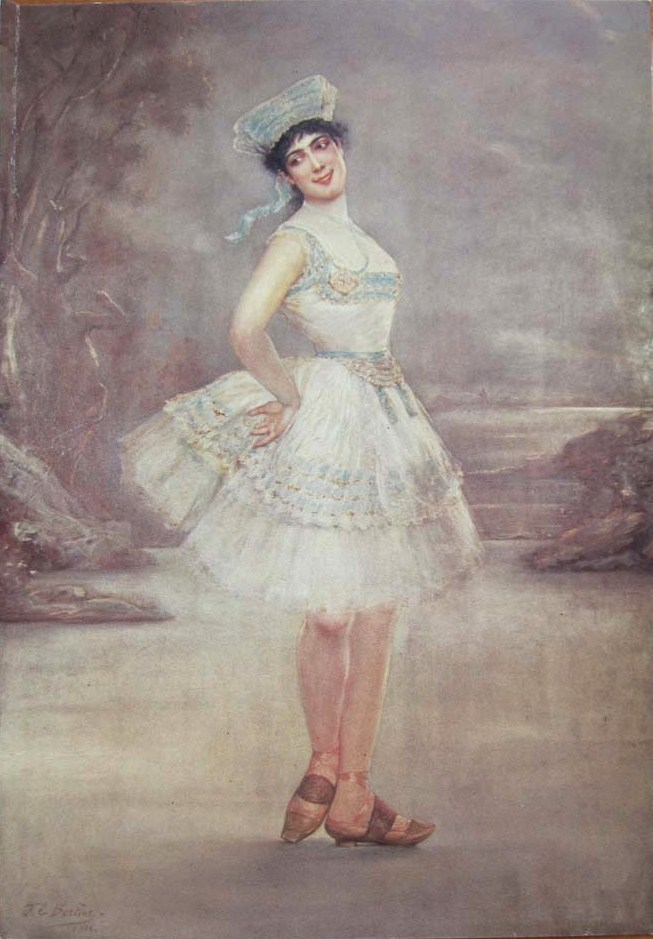
Clog dance in La Korrigane, 1880

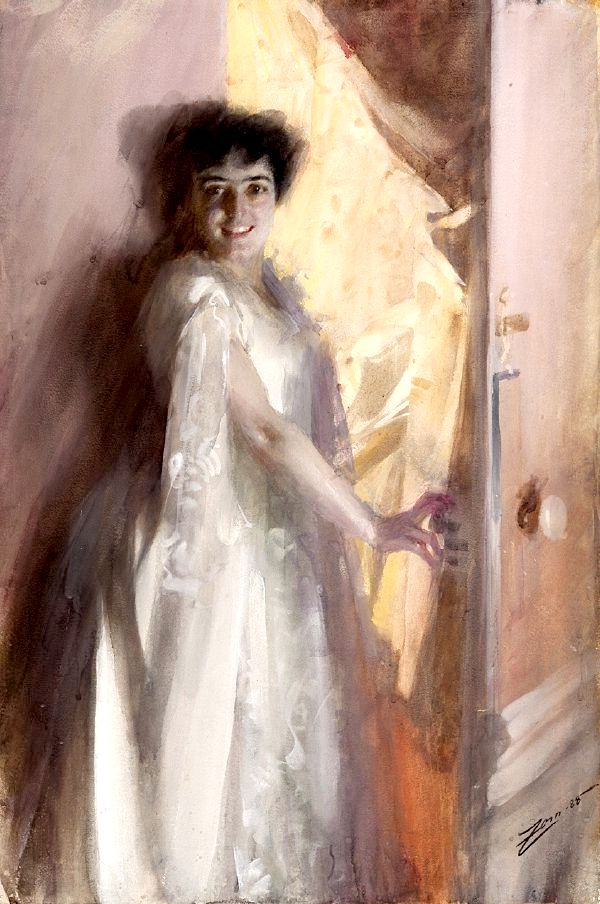
Watercolour by Anders Zorn, 1888

== Sources ==
- Media related to Rosita Mauri at Wikimedia Commons
- (in Catalan) Ferran Canyameres, La Dansarina Roseta Mauri, L’Associació d’Estudis Reusencs, 1971]
