= Christuskirche, Paris =

Church of Protestants in Paris, France

Christuskirche
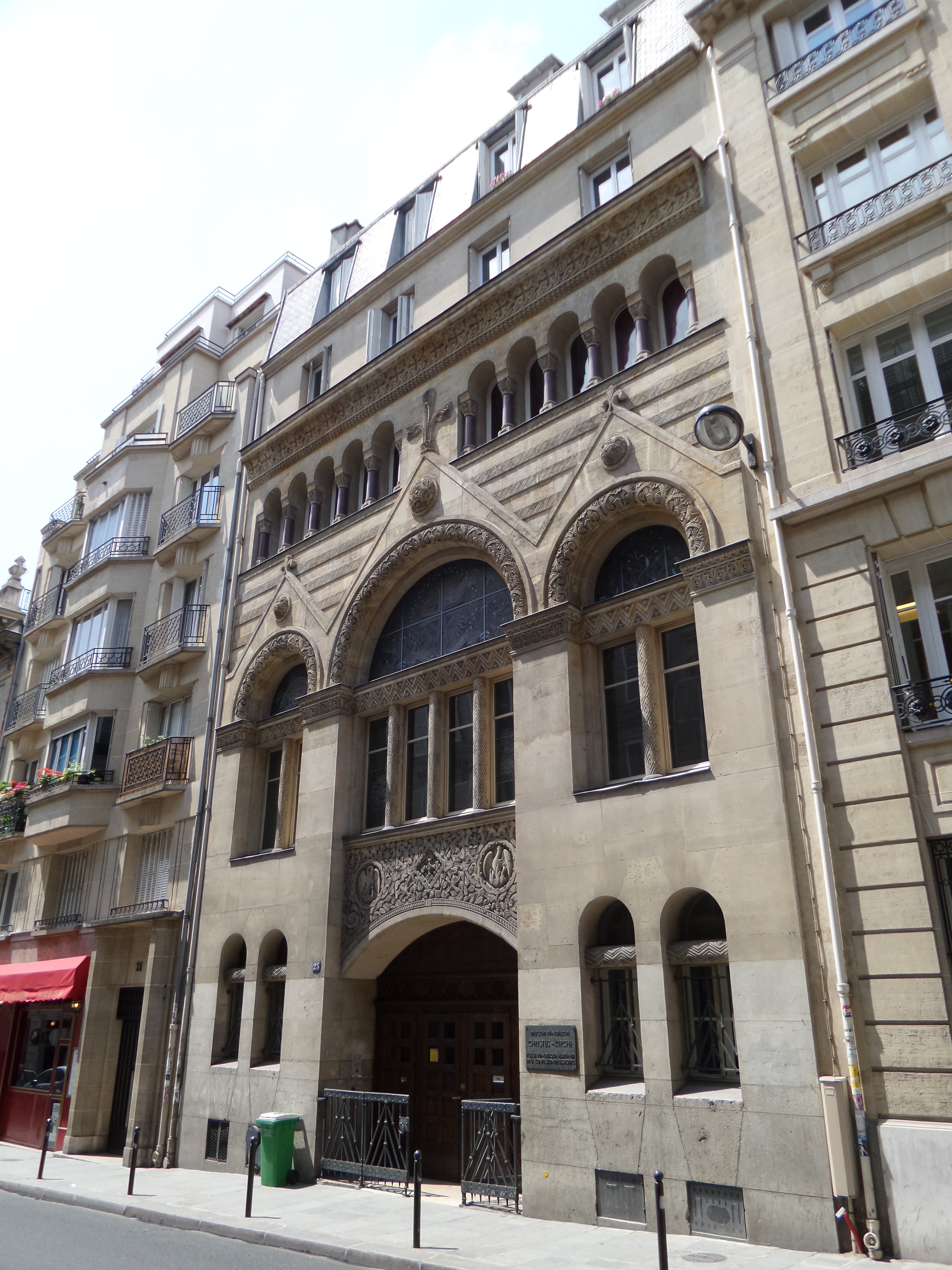
- The German Church in Paris from the street, 2014

Religion
- Affiliation: Evangelische Kirche in Deutschland (EKD)
- Ecclesiastical or organisational status: Parish church

Location
- Location: 25 rue Blanche, 9th arrondissement, Paris
- Interactive map of Christuskirche
- Coordinates: 48°52′46″N 02°19′52″E

Architecture
- Style: Gothic; Baroque (Interior)
- Completed: 1894

Website
- www.christuskirche.fr

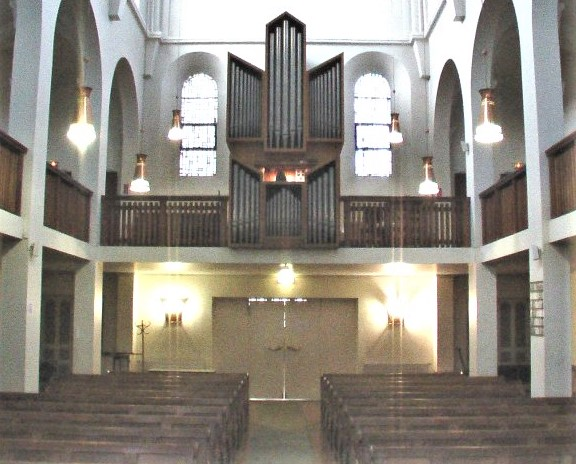
View towards the organ

The Christuskirche is the church and parish of German Protestants in Paris (25 rue Blanche, 9th arrondissement). Initially founded as a Lutheran church, today it is a United church. The present building was completed in 1894. The official name is Deutsche Evangelische Christuskirche – Église protestant allemande à Paris. The church is a member of the Evangelische Kirche in Deutschland (EKD). It has a tradition as a concert venue of church music, with Helga Schauerte as the organist from 1982.

== History ==
The German Protestant parish in Paris dates back to the 17th century, when Protestants were not permitted to hold services in Paris. Religious freedom was established during the French Revolution, particularly through the Declaration of the Rights of Man and of the Citizen of 1789 and the Constitution of 1791. Under Napoleon, the Organic Articles of 1802 recognized and regulated the Lutheran and Reformed churches within the French state. In 1806, the government ended the worship of French Lutherans in foreign embassy chapels, and in 1808 established a Lutheran consistory in Paris. In the 19th century, around 70,000 Germans lived in Paris. They were guests in other churches for their services, until the present church was built in 1894. The building was confiscated during World War I. When it was returned to the German congregation in the 1920s, its interior was remodelled.

The first organ was built with the church, by Gebr. Link from Giengen. The instrument took part in the Universal Exhibition in Antwerp in 1894, and was awarded a Medal of Honor. It was dismantled in World War I, and transferred to the Church of Ascension, Rue Dulong, in Paris in 1919. The project of a new organ was supported by Albert Schweitzer, but was interrupted by World War II. The present organ was built in 1964 by Detlef Kleuker from Bielefeld. It is modeled after German Baroque organs. Konrad Adenauer, the German Chancellor, supported its financing. Titular organists were Gunther Morche (1964), Detlef Wieghorst (1965–1966), Peter Neumann (1966–1967), Detlef Schmidt (1967–1968), Wolfgang Karius (1968–1970), Jean-Marc Pulvert (1971), Edgar Krapp (1971–1972), Annetta Schmid (1972–1974), Elisabeth Roloff (1974–1982), and since Helga Schauerte.

The church is a venue of church music concerts. In 2014, the J. S. Bach-Stiftung held a sold-out concert of three cantatas from Bach's Christmas Oratorio which is rarely performed in Paris. The concert was repeated the following year. In 2016, three cantatas from the oratorio were performed by the Neue Bachgesellschaft, with German soloists and the chamber choir Les Temperamens Variations, conducted by Thibault Lam Quang. The group performed the complete oratorio there on 8 December 2019, with Jan Kobow as the Evangelist.
