= The Two Pigeons =

The Two Pigeons (original French title: Les deux pigeons) is a fable by Jean de la Fontaine (Book IX.2) that was adapted as a ballet with music by André Messager in the 19th century and rechoreagraphed to the same music by Frederick Ashton in the 20th.

== Fable ==
La Fontaine ascribed the fable to the Persian author Bidpai and had found it in an abridged version titled "The Book of Enlightenment or the Conduct of Kings". The original is of some length, embroidered as it is with many an exquisite flower of rhetoric upon the trellis of its exposition. In essence it differs little from La Fontaine's abbreviated version. Two pigeons (or doves in Elizur Wright's American translation) live together in the closest friendship and 'cherish for each other/The love that brother hath for brother.' One of them yearns for a change of scene and eventually flies off on what he promises will be only a three-day adventure. During this time he is caught in a storm with little shelter, ensnared, attacked by predators and then injured by a boy with a sling, returning with relief to roam no more.

La Fontaine gives his text a Classical turn by alluding to a poem by Horace during its course. Horace's "Epistle to Aristus Fuscus" begins

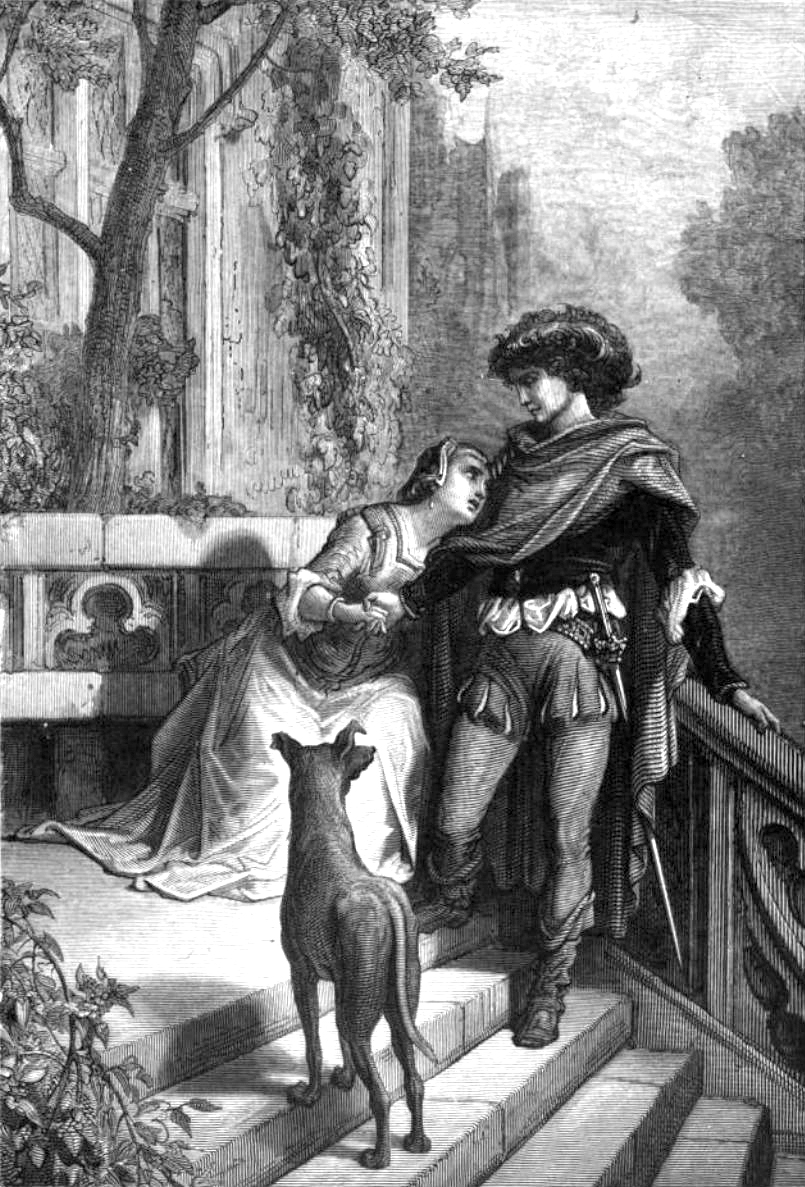
Gustave Doré's illustration of The Two Pigeons (Octave Uzanne, Le Livre, Paris, A. Quantin, 1883.)

To Fuscus the city-lover I the country-lover
Send greetings. To be sure in this one matter we
Differ much, but in everything else we’re like twins
With brothers’ hearts (if one says no, so does the other)
And we nod in agreement like old familiar doves.
You guard the nest: I praise the streams and woods
And the mossy rocks of a beautiful countryside. (Epistles I.10)

Turtle doves are traditionally the symbol of close bonding and their appearance in Horace's poem would not be enough alone to constitute the intended allusion. But at the end of his poem La Fontaine returns to the Horatian theme of a preference for the country over life in the city. Reflecting on a youthful (heterosexual) love affair, he declares that he would not then have exchanged for a life at Court the woods in which his beloved wandered. It is this sentiment that has gained the fable the reputation of being La Fontaine's best and tenderest as it comes to rest on an evocation of past innocence:

O, did my wither'd heart but dare
To kindle for the bright and good,
Should not I find the charm still there?
Is love, to me, with things that were?

Translations of the fable were familiar enough in Britain but the subject of male bonding left some readers uneasy (as it very obviously did Elizur Wright). Eventually there appeared an 18th-century version in octosyllabic couplets that claimed to be ‘improved from Fontaine’. Here the couple are a male and female named Columbo and Turturella. Apart from this, the only real difference is that, in place of an authorial narration, Columbo relates his misadventures to Turturella after his return and she draws the moral ‘Ere misfortunes teach, be wise’. The new version, also titled "The Two Doves", has been attributed to John Hawkesworth, one of the editors of The Gentleman's Magazine in which it first appeared (July 1748, p 326). Unascribed there, it remained so when reprinted in Thomas Bewick’s Select Fables of Aesop and others (1818).

The change in gender was replicated when the fable was later made the subject of a Parisian ballet. By that time the French were already disposed to interpret it in this way. Gustave Doré, who often transposes the fables into equivalent human situations, did so in his 1868 illustration of "The Two Pigeons". This pictures a couple in 17th century dress, the woman hanging onto the departing gallant's hand and leaning towards him with concern in her eyes.

== Ballets ==
André Messager based a ballet on La Fontaine's fable under the title Les Deux Pigeons. This was first performed in three acts at the Paris Opéra in the autumn of 1886 with choreography by Louis Mérante, libretto by Mérante and Henri de Régnier.

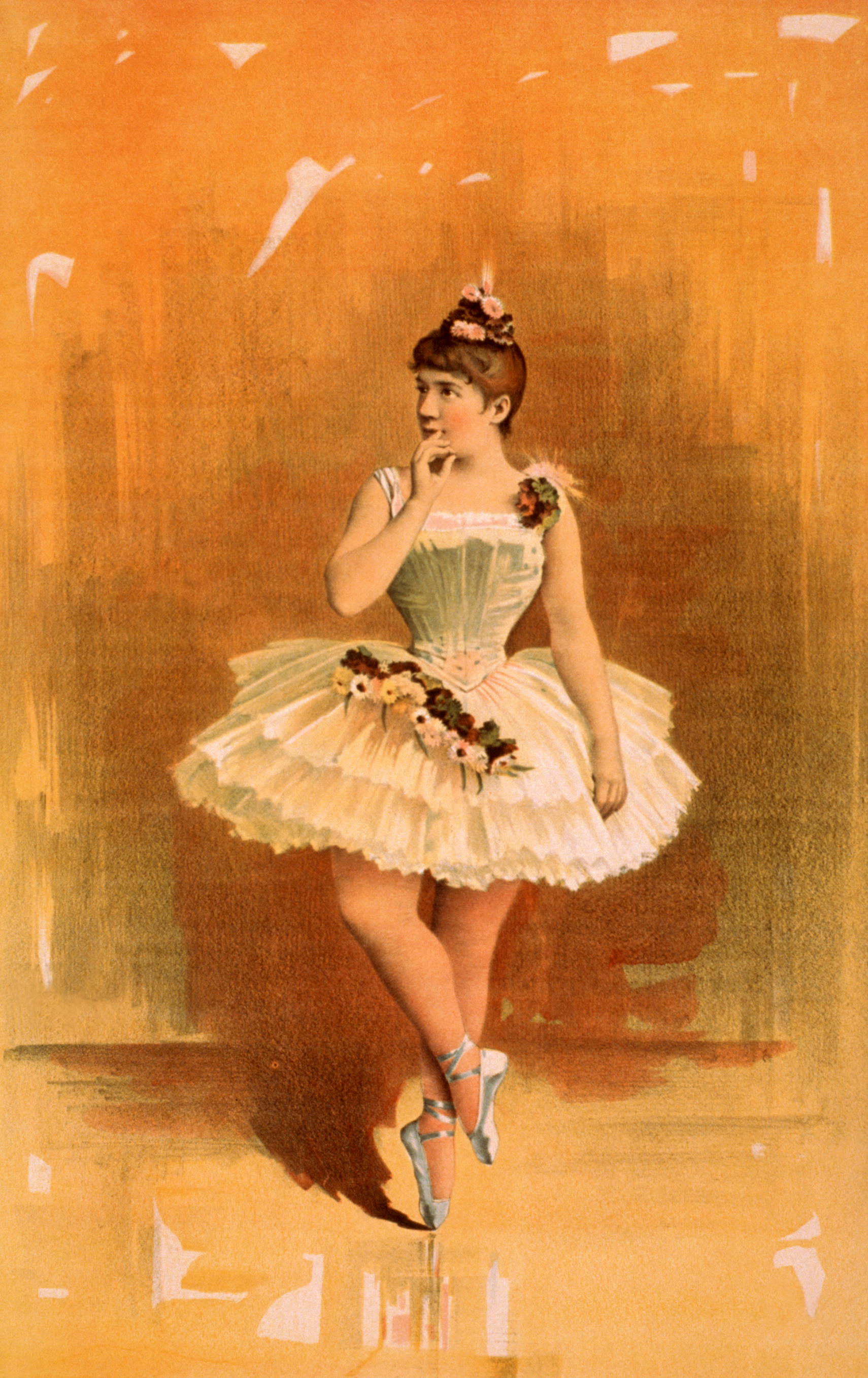
French print of a ballerina (Calvert Litho. Co., c. 1890)

In the original scenario, set in 18th century Thessaly, the hero Pépio (danced then by a woman) is discontented with life at home and with the company of his fiancée Gourouli. Their uneasy relationship is symbolised by the pas de deux the two lovers perform at the start in imitation of two pigeons they have been observing, quarreling with small irritated movements of the head and then coming together to make up. When a group of gypsies visit their village, Pépio is seduced by the energetic czardas that they dance and flirts with the dusky Djali, eventually leaving his love behind to join in their wanderings. Gourouli's grandmother advises her to follow him disguised as a gypsy. Arriving at their camp, she makes all the men fall in love with her and bribes one of them to make Pépio's life miserable. A storm breaks and the gypsies disappear with Pépio's money. He returns home chastened and asks forgiveness.

The ballet was later introduced to London in 1906 with choreography by François Ambroisiny and a shortened score by Messager himself. He used this shortened version when the piece was revived at the Paris Opéra in 1912, and it was published as a final version. A one-act version was choreographed by Albert Aveline at the Opera in 1919 and it was not until 1942 that the role of Pépio was finally danced by a man.

The discovery of the shortened score used at Covent Garden prompted Frederick Ashton to make his own one-hour version of the ballet, set in Paris at the time of the music's composition. At the start a French painter is revealed trying to paint his lover, who is sitting on an ornate cast-iron chair. The session is interrupted by the entry of the model's friends and his responsiveness to other female company underlines his restless spirit. A troupe of gypsies that he sees through the garret window, misunderstanding a gesture of his, now crowd in and a quarrel develops over possession of the chair between the model and a hot-blooded Carmen with whom the painter is flirting. Perceiving that they are not really welcome, the gypsy leader leaves the studio and the painter dashes off to join them. However, his intrusion into their social order is resented and he is thrown out of the encampment. Returning to the lover he has left behind, they are reconciled and sit together on the ornate chair that has dominated the room.

The ballet's title is further underlined by Ashton's use of two live pigeons to represent the lovers. Seen together during the first act, while the artist and his lover dance together, the young man's dissatisfaction and temporary desertion of the girl are underlined by one pigeon flying alone across the stage before the interval. The painter's return in the next act is prompted by a pigeon coming to land on his shoulder; once harmony is restored, both pigeons perch above the lovers on the chair. The ballet was premiered on St. Valentine's Day in February 1961 and has since been performed regularly by the Royal Ballet touring company, as well as staged by several other dance companies around the world.

== Musical interpretations ==
As the 1912 version didn't provide a return to the opening scene at the end, Ashton's musical arranger John Lanchbery constructed a closing reconciliation scene from earlier music and a passage from Messager's operetta Véronique, as well as revising the orchestration in favour of a richer sound. John Lanchbery recorded his version of the ballet music for EMI in 1984 with the Bournemouth Symphony Orchestra. In 1991 the Orchestra of the Welsh National Opera released a recording of Messager's short score.

La Fontaine's fable also served as the inspiration for Charles Aznavour's song "Les Deux Pigeons", which was featured in a segment of the film 3 Fables of Love (1962). The song is a sad one, since in this case the pigeon has not returned home. In common with the fable of La Fontaine, a parallel is drawn between the parting of male friends (Un pigeon regrettait son frère) and a broken heterosexual relationship. A later song by Gérard Manset really only features the fable's opening line, Deux pigeons s'aimaient d'amour tendre, and was issued on his album La Vallée de la Paix (1994). It contemplates the impossibility of happiness since love is always threatened by the fall of winter.

Settings of La Fontaine's fable include one by Charles Gounod (1883) which omits the story and only includes the 19-line final sentiment. The German composer Stefan Wolpe set a translation by Heinrich von Kleist: "Die Beiden Tauben" features as the third song for baritone and piano in his Drei Lieder von Heinrich von Kleist (op.3, 1925).
