= Pontaumur =

- Commune
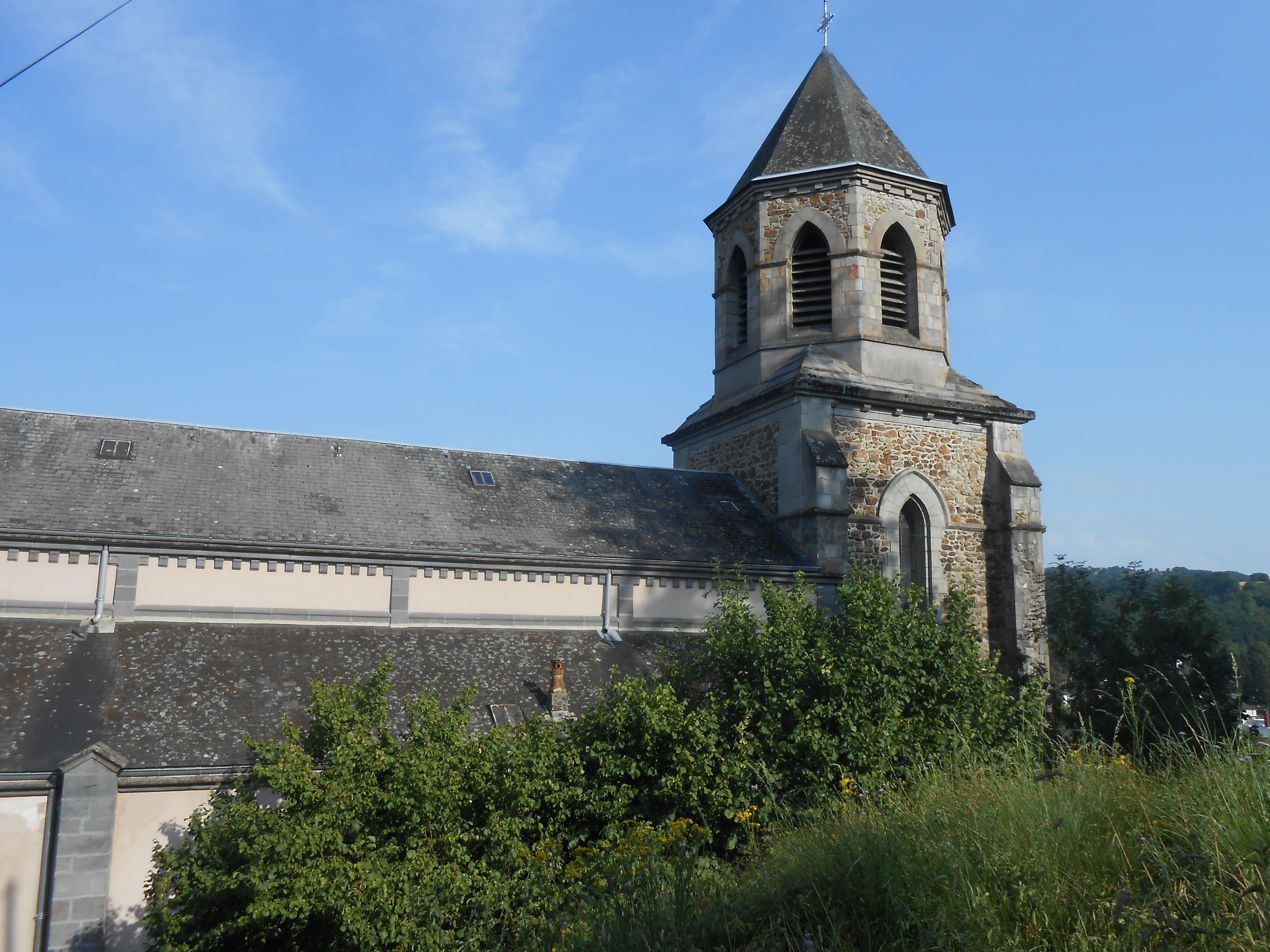
- The church in Pontaumur

- Coat of arms
- Location of Pontaumur
- Location within France Location within Auvergne-Rhône-Alpes
- Coordinates: 45°52′08″N 2°40′30″E
- Country: France
- Region: Auvergne-Rhône-Alpes
- Department: Puy-de-Dôme
- Arrondissement: Riom
- Canton: Saint-Ours
- Intercommunality: CC Chavanon Combrailles et Volcans

Government
  - Mayor (2020–2026): Charles Carrias
- Area^{1}: 13.81 km^{2} (5.33 sq mi)
- Elevation: 536 m (1,759 ft)
- Highest elevation: 755 m (2,477 ft)
- Lowest elevation: 525 m (1,722 ft)
- Population (2023): 670
  - Density: 49/km^{2} (130/sq mi)
- Time zone: UTC+01:00 (CET)
  - Summer (DST): UTC+02:00 (CEST)
- INSEE/Postal code: 63283 /63380
- ^{1} French Land Register data, which excludes lakes, ponds, glaciers > 1 km^{2} (0.386 sq mi or 247 acres) and river estuaries.

Pontaumur (French pronunciation: [pɔ̃tomyʁ]) is a village and commune located 41 kilometres west from Clermont-Ferrand in the Puy-de-Dôme department in Auvergne in central France.

Since 2004, its church has been home to a replica of the organ at Arnstadt, on which Johann Sebastian Bach played. Initially launched to raise funds for the organ, the Festival Bach en Combrailles takes place every summer in Pontaumur and neighbouring villages, celebrating Bach's music.

== See also ==
- Communes of the Puy-de-Dôme department
