= Ludovic-Napoléon Lepic =

French painter (1839–1889)

Ludovic Lepic
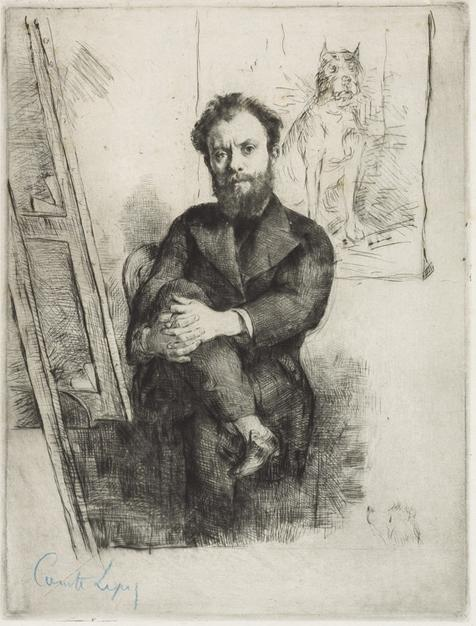
- Etching by Marcellin-Gilbert Desboutin, c.1876
- Born: Ludovic-Napoléon Lepic; 17 December 1839; Paris, France
- Died: 27 October 1889 (aged 49); Paris, France
- Known for: Painting, engraving
- Movement: Impressionism

Ludovic-Napoléon Lepic (17 December 1839 – 27 October 1889) was a French artist, archaeologist and patron of the arts. He was styled as Vicomte Lepic until his father's death in 1875, when he succeeded to the title of Comte Lepic. He was among the original Impressionist group and later became a recognised marine painter. He is best remembered today as a friend and colleague of Edgar Degas, who included him in some eleven paintings and pastels.

== Life and career ==
Lepic was the grandson of the Napoleonic general Louis Lepic, from whom the comital title had descended. His father was Louis-Joseph-Napoléon Lepic (1810–1875), who had a distinguished military career and was a close supporter of Napoléon III.

Destined for a similar career, Ludovic persuaded his father to allow him to train as a painter instead, originally with Gustave Wappers, the official painter of the Belgian king, and later with the animal painter Charles Verlat, who encouraged him to take up etching. Much of Lepic's early work was in this genre, and he joined the Société des aquafortistes in 1862. The following year, he gained notability for his sentimental etching For the Poor, after which he undertook further training from Charles Gleyre and the academic artist Alexandre Cabanel.

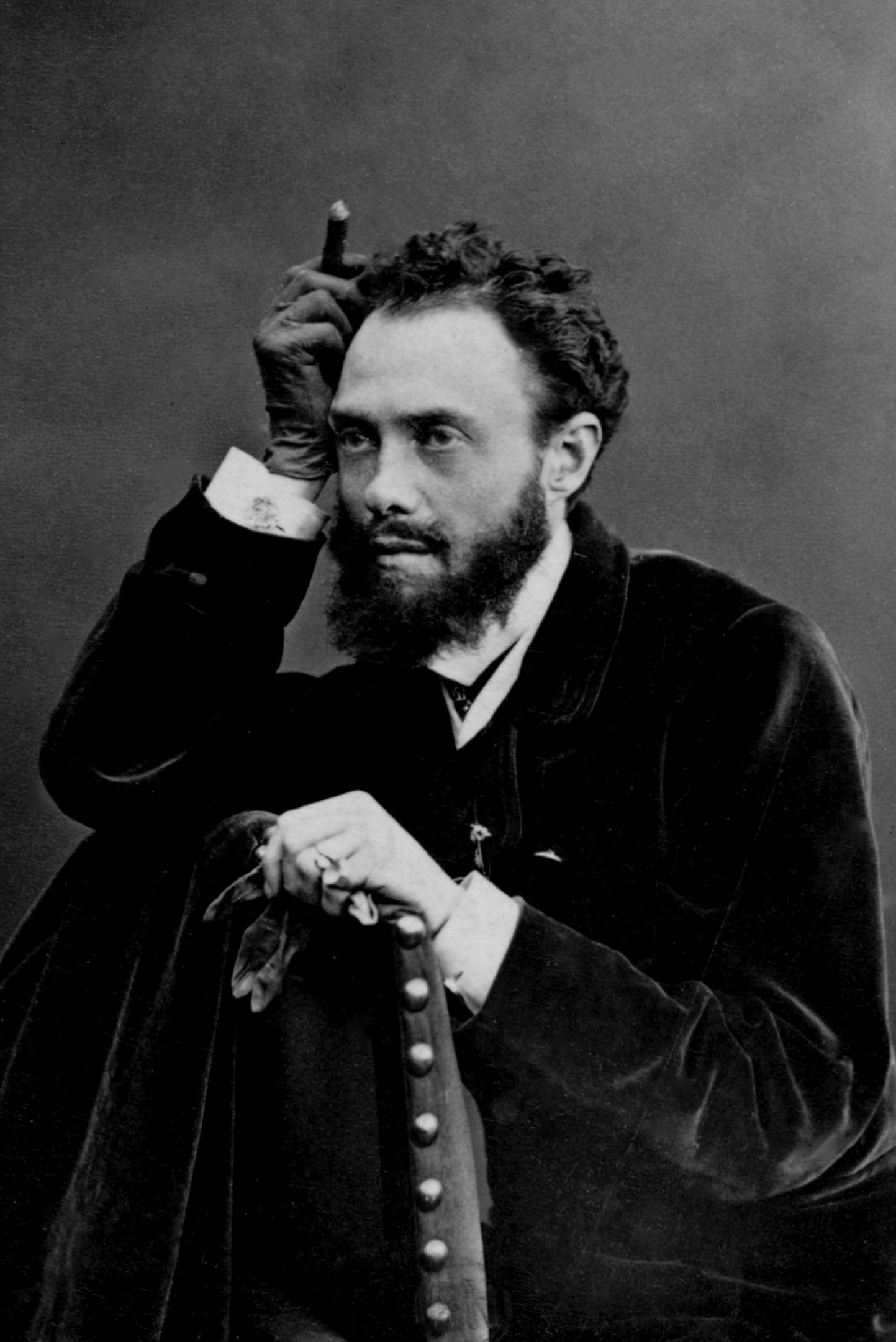
Photo of Lepic by Nadar

During the next few years, he took up archaeology and between 1869–76 was a member of the Société d'anthropologie de Paris. In 1872, he founded a museum at Aix-les-Bains and published a ground-breaking illustrated work on prehistoric tools, Les armes et les outils préhistoriques reconstitués. His experiments with etching during this time were equally innovative, and he developed the technique of 'variable etching' (eau-forte mobile) where, by varying the ink on the plate, he was able to produce individual results at each printing. He was to teach this technique to his old friend Edgar Degas and the two co-operated on, and duly signed, Degas' large monotype The ballet master of 1874, now in the National Gallery of Art, Washington.

Lepic and Degas were friends as young men, with similar interests, and were to co-operate in other ways too. It was Degas who persuaded Lepic to help plan and participate in the first two Impressionist exhibitions, but insistence by the group that he should not exhibit at the same time in the official Salon led Lepic to distance himself from them. During this time, he had bought himself a boat and from 1877 paid annual visits to the town of Berck, south of Le Touquet, which was an artistic haven also for other artists on the fringes of Impressionism, such as Édouard Manet and Eugène Boudin. It is for his depictions of the beach and fishing boats there that Lepic is particularly remembered as a painter today.

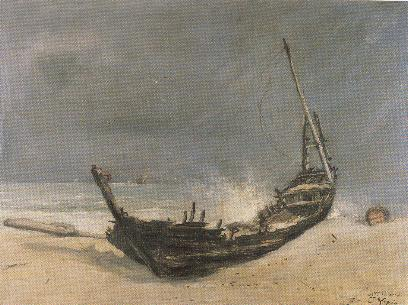
Lepic's painting of The Smashed Boat was one of the medal-winners at the 1877 Salon

In 1883, he achieved recognition by being appointed an official marine painter by the state, following his growing popularity after the award of a medal at the 1877 Salon. In 1879, he had a large individual exhibition of some 100 pictures at the Gallery "La vie moderne" and in 1883, he exhibited 150 at the Musée des Arts décoratifs. In between, he had published an illustrated account of an archaeological trip to Egypt, La dernière Egypte (1881).

The appearance of Lepic in several works by Degas records some of the enthusiasms they had in common. These included horse racing and Degas' Gentlemen's race: Before the start (1862; Musée d'Orsay) pictures Lepic mounted among the jockeys. Ballet was another enthusiasm. Lepic is shown gazing through opera glasses in The ballet from Robert le Diable (1871; Metropolitan Museum of Art, New York), one of Degas' earliest treatments of the subject, and in quarter profile from behind in the Victoria & Albert Museum's larger copy (1876).

Boats on the Beach at Berck, c. 1876, Legion of Honor, San Francisco

Lepic's fondness for dogs, evidenced by his many etchings, resulted in Degas' final pastel of Lepic holding one in the Cleveland Museum of Art (1889). Earlier, he had included another dog in the amusing Place de la Concorde, in which the elegantly dressed and cigar-smoking Lepic strides to the right, an umbrella under his arm, while his two daughters and the dog all face the other way. Earlier still, the daughters appeared on either side of their father in the intimate painting Ludovic Lepic and His Daughters (1871).

Notwithstanding his marriage in 1865 with Joséphine Scévole de Barral, the mother of these daughters, Lepic was later to take the prima ballerina Marie Sanlaville as his mistress and designed dresses for the ballets in which she danced, including the Harlequin costume for Les Jumeaux de Bergame. Degas was also to sketch this while it was in rehearsal in 1885. In 1889, he was suddenly taken ill, and Marie Sanlaville cared for him at her apartment until his death in October. He was then interred in the vault of the family property at Andrésy.

== Sources and further reading ==
- The Andrésy site
- John Denison Champlin, Jr., ed., Cyclopedia of painters and paintings, New York 1913, p.65.
- A list of national holdings at The French Government site
