= Louis Mérante =

Ballet dancer, teacher and choreographer (Paris Opera)

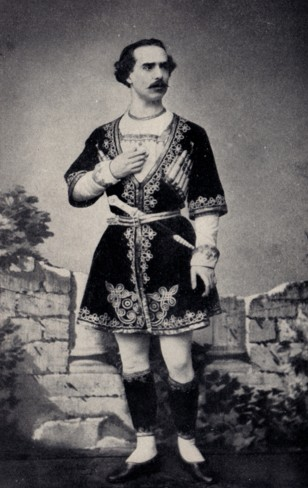
Louis Mérante as Djémil in the Saint-Léon/Delibes La Source, Paris, 1866

Louis Alexandre Mérante (23 July 1828–Courbevoie, 17 July 1887) was a dancer and choreographer, the Maître de Ballet (First Balletmaster/Chief Choreographer) of the Paris Opera Ballet at the Salle Le Peletier until its destruction by fire in 1873, and subsequently the first Ballet Master at the company's new Palais Garnier, which opened in 1875. He is best remembered as the choreographer of Léo Delibes' Sylvia, ou la nymphe de Diane (1876). With Arthur Saint-Léon and Jules Perrot, he is one of the three choreographers who defined the French ballet tradition during the Second French Empire and the Third Republic according to choreographer Pierre Lacotte.

== Biography ==
Born in Paris, Mérante was a pupil of Lucien Petipa, with whom he figured on the six-member select jury of the first annual competition for the Corps de ballet, held on 13 April 1860. The jury included the director of the new Conservatoire de danse, as well as the former ballerina Marie Taglioni, its guiding spirit.

Following Sylvia Mérante choreographed Le Fandango, a ballet-pantomime with music by Gaston Salvayre that premiered November 26, 1877. The scenario was penned by the team of Henri Meilhac and Ludovic Halévy, who provided librettos to Offenbach and had recently delivered a libretto on a similarly Spanish theme to Georges Bizet—Carmen.

His ballet, Les Deux Pigeons, after the fable by La Fontaine, to music by André Messager has been revived with new choreography, as a showpiece for the youngest dancers of the Paris Opera Ballet. But other ballets, with a mime libretto whose authors normally shared credit with Mérante, are perhaps an irretrievably lost part of ballet history: La Korrigane, "ballet fantastique" by Charles-Marie Widor on a libretto by François Coppée, choreographed by Mérante; Les Jumeaux de Bergame, "ballet-arlequinade" by Charles Nuitter and Mérante, to music by Th. de Lajarte, and others, produced season after season for the Opéra Garnier.

Edgar Degas included the figure of Mérante, in an immaculate white suit, with the traditional baton for beating time on the floorboards, in his 1872 painting Le foyer de danse. The painting marked the beginning of Dégas' long infatuation with the ballet, but though he had sketched the individual dancers, and the practice room in the company's old premises in the Salle Le Peletier, with its great arched mirror, he was not permitted to attend a rehearsal in person.

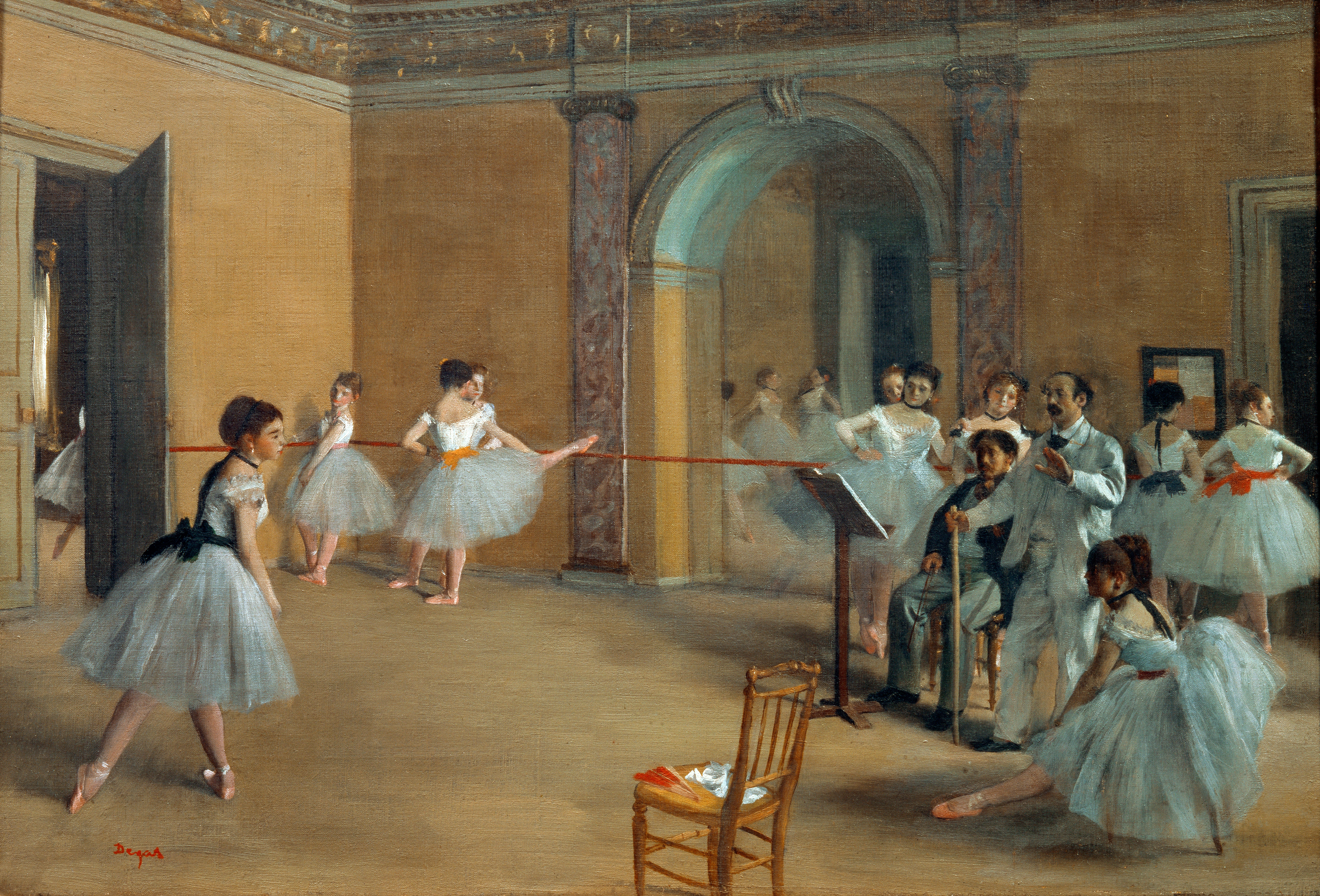
Edgar Degas included Mérante in his Foyer de Danse à l'Opéra de la rue Le Peletier, which shows the Balletmaster rehearsing in the Foyer de la Danse of the Salle Le Peletier, 1872

Wife (in 1861): the Russian ballerina Zinaida Richard (Mlle Zina, étoile in 1857-1863), whose father Joseph Richard was a French ballet dancer who had come to Russia in 1823 with his niece (or sister) Félicité Hullin Sor and her husband Fernando Sor.

== See also ==
- Leap!
