= Posthumous fame of Vincent van Gogh =

The fame of Vincent van Gogh began to spread in France and Belgium during the last year of his life, and in the years after his death in the Netherlands and Germany. His closeness with his younger brother Theo was documented in numerous letters they exchanged from August 1872 onwards. The letters were published in three volumes in 1914 by Johanna van Gogh-Bonger, Theo's widow, who also generously supported most of the early Van Gogh exhibitions with loans from the artist's estate. Publication of the letters helped spread the compelling mystique of Vincent van Gogh, the intense and dedicated painter who died young, throughout Europe and the rest of the world.

His fame reached its first peak in Austria and Germany before World War I (influencing a whole generation of German artists) and at the end of the war in Switzerland. Due to the economic crisis in Germany and France after 1918, pioneer collections of Impressionist and Post-Impressionist art, which included works by Van Gogh, were dissolved. This gave British and American collectors (private as well as public) the opportunity to acquire first-rate works. The American novelist Irving Stone published a fictionalized account of Van Gogh's life in 1934 entitled Lust for Life, which was largely based on the letters to Theo; this book and later the 1956 movie of the same name added to the artist's fame.

== Lifetime exhibits ==
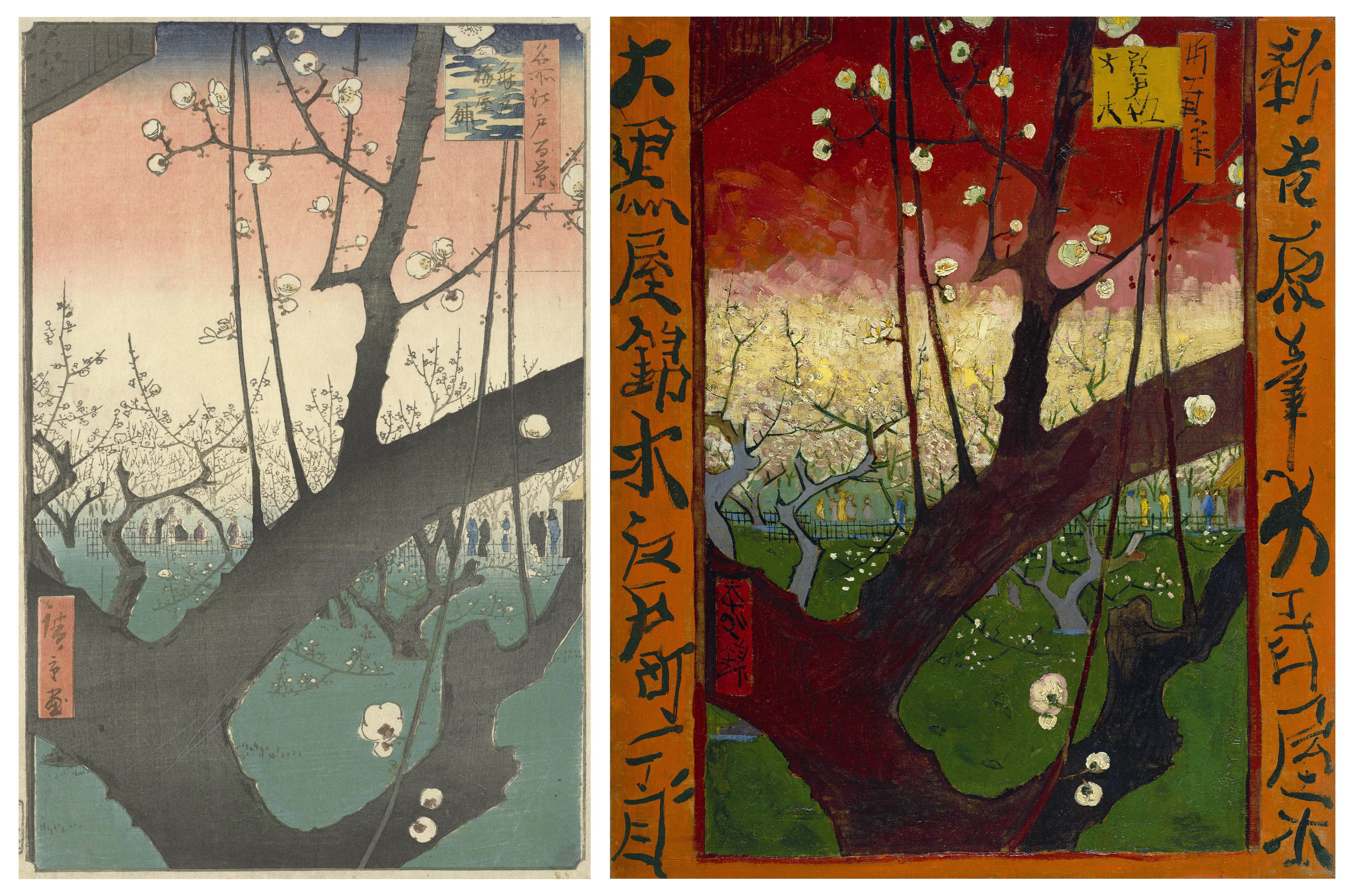
Hiroshige's wood-cut "Flowering Plumtrees at Kameido" (1857) and Vincent van Gogh's oil version (1887)

During his lifetime, Van Gogh contributed works of his own to shows on only a few minor occasions, which mainly passed unnoticed by critics and the public. An example, in 1887, was a display of Japanese woodcuts in the restaurant Au Tambourin, 62 Boulevard de Clichy, in Montmartre, Paris, then run by Augustina Ségatori, for which Van Gogh probably interpreted three famous ukiyo-e prints by Keisai Eisen and Hiroshige.

Towards the end of this year, he organized another exhibition in the Grand-Bouillon Restaurant du Chalet, 43 Avenue de Clichy, in Montmartre, to which his friends Émile Bernard, Louis Anquetin and evidently Henri de Toulouse-Lautrec contributed. Van Gogh considered the first one a disaster, while he was prepared to take the second one as a success: Bernard and Anquetin sold paintings, and he himself had exchanged works with Paul Gauguin. There are two short accounts of this exhibition, one based on information supplied by Georges Seurat and the other one written by Émile Bernard:

- In 1890, Seurat recalled to have met Vincent there for the first time, "in one of these populaire soup kitchens in Avenue de Clichy, now closed. The hall was decorated with his canvases (1887)."
- Already in 1889, at the time of the Volpini Exhibition, Émile Bernard had prepared a review of Van Gogh's work for Aurier's Moderniste, which was, as this modest paper ceased to appear suddenly, published for the first time a century later, in 1990.

In 1888, Van Gogh joined the "Société des Artistes Indépendants"; so this year three of his paintings were on show in their annual exhibition in Paris, and two in the year following (due to restrictions caused in 1889 by the Exposition Universelle). In 1890 and 1891, their annual exhibitions comprised ten paintings by Vincent; part of them had been shown before by the society "Les XX" in Brussels, in 1891 completed by a dozen of drawings (some of them only on view "by demand"). According to letters from his brother Theo, Vincent's contributions to these few exhibitions established his renown amongst French vanguard painters like Claude Monet and Paul Signac.

== Early promoters ==
Probably it is little more than for curiosity that one of the first mentions of Van Gogh in a newspaper was printed in Arles. On September 30, 1888, L'Homme de Bronze told its readers

"Mr. Vincent, impressionist painter, works in the night, as we are assured, in the glow of the gas lanterns on one of our public places."

Earlier this year, Van Gogh's contribution to the exhibition of the Artists Indépendants has been reviewed.

Notes on Van Gogh's exhibits were again published in 1889, among them a review by the Dutch painter Joseph Jacob Isaacson, a friend of Meyer de Haan and Theo van Gogh, which was printed in the 17 August 1889 issue of the Amsterdam weekly De Portefeuille. Vincent felt more troubled than honoured and asked Isaacson to stop writing about him.

But there was no chance to turn the wheel back. In January 1890, in the first issue refounding the Mercure de France, Albert Aurier published his enthusiastic essay 'Les Isolés: Vincent van Gogh', which contributed to Vincent's fame as an artist as well as Aurier's as a leading art critic.

Another voice was Octave Mirbeau's whose review article 'Vincent van Gogh' in L'Écho de Paris was published on 1 March 1891. Later that year Van Gogh's friend Émile Bernard contributed short pieces on Van Gogh for La Plume and Les Hommes d’aujourd’hui.

Julius Meier-Graefe wrote influentially of Van Gogh, his publications including Entwicklungsgeschichte der modernen Kunst (Stuttgart 1904 and Munich 1927), Über Vincent van Gogh, Sozialistische Monatshefte (February 1906), Vincent van Gogh (Munich 1912), and Van Gogh der Zeichner (Berlin, 1928, published by Otto Wacker). Meier-Graefe also wrote an influential two-volume biography of Van Gogh, published in 1921.

In the English-speaking world, the Bloomsbury art critics Roger Fry and Clive Bell were his first champions. Fry, in a 1924 essay, "Vincent van Gogh," reported that after Van Gogh's death, he "disappeared" and "scarcely any picture dealer in Bond Street gave him another thought" until the 1910 show, "Post Impressionist Exhibition," in which "his works dazzled, astonished and infuriated all cultured England." Fry's essay canonized Van Gogh as "a saint" of art, "the victim of the terrible intensity of his convictions—his conviction that somewhere one might lay hold of spiritual values compared with which all other values were of no account." His works gave "an expression in paint for the desperate violence of his spiritual hunger....". That set the agenda for many subsequent Van Gogh studies, which are predominantly biographical to this day. Van Gogh fits modern culture's attempt to find secular substitutes for a religion it no longer believed in, as M. H. Abrams describes in "Natural Supernaturalism" (1970).

== Early exhibitions ==
Retrospectives occurred in Brussels and Paris in 1891. During the 1890s, Van Gogh exhibitions were staged in several Dutch and Belgian towns. In 1893, Julien Leclercq brought together a first exhibition featuring Van Gogh, Gauguin, and other modernists touring Denmark, Norway, Sweden, Finland, and Berlin. In 1895 and 1896, Ambroise Vollard mounted Van Gogh retrospectives in his galleries at Rue Lafitte; other minor dealers in Paris had works by Van Gogh continuously on display. In 1901, Leclercq arranged a Van Gogh exhibition at the Galerie Bernheim-Jeune in Paris.

Later in 1901, the Berlin Secessionists entered the scene, accompanied by the art dealers Bruno Cassirer and his cousin Paul, who set the pace for the years to come. In the last days of December, running through January 1902, Paul Cassirer organized the first van Gogh exhibition in Berlin, Germany. Minor exhibitions of some recently found early works were held in Rotterdam and Amsterdam in 1903 and 1904. Dresden's Brücke group, founded in 1905 by artists Ernst Ludwig Kirchner, Fritz Bleyl, Erich Heckel and Karl Schmidt-Rottluff, put on a series of exhibitions of Van Gogh's work in Germany in 1905 and 1908, having been introduced to his work by Paul Cassirer. March 5–22, 1908 Paul Cassirer organized another expo in Berlin which included the painting Peach Blossoms in the Crau lent by Anna Boch. Cassirer first established a market for Van Gogh, and then, with the assistance of Johanna van Gogh-Bonger, controlled market prices. In 1906 Bruno Cassirer published a small volume of selected letters of Vincent's to Theo, translated into German. However, Johanna was keen to maintain her independence, and contributed important loans to Roger Fry's 1910 London exhibition, as well as to the important Sonderbund exhibition of 1912 in Cologne, where Van Gogh was introduced to visitors as "the father to us all". This was organized by an independent committee of artists, collectors and museum professionals, but was dependent on loans arranged by Cassirer, the Bernheim-Jeune gallery and other art dealers.

The first major exhibition from the artist's estate was held in 1892 at the Amsterdam 'Panorama' Building, the next in 1905 at the Stedelijk Museum in Amsterdam, followed in 1914 by a display concentrating on Van Gogh's drawings.

== Early private and public collectors ==
The Red Vineyard, 1888, oil on canvas, 75 × 93 cm, Pushkin Museum, Moscow

Van Gogh's friends, his colleagues and promoters were at the same time his first collectors. Anna Boch, Paul Gauguin, Émile Bernard, Toulouse-Lautrec, Émile Schuffenecker, Edgar Degas as well as Albert Aurier, Octave Mirbeau, Julien Leclercq and Van Eeden - each of them held works by Van Gogh.

During the 1890 "Les XX" expo in Brussels van Gogh sold one of his paintings, The Red Vineyard. It was purchased by Anna Boch, impressionist painter, heiress of a Ceramics fortune and sister of his friend Eugène Boch. Although The Red Vineyard is often said to be the only work of art van Gogh sold during his lifetime, he actually managed to sell at least a couple of other paintings, as well as some drawings. He also exchanged works with other artists and sometimes used them as a payment for food or painting and drawing material.

In 1903, the first works of Vincent van Gogh entered museum collections in Vienna and Rotterdam, as well as Folkwang Museum, then privately run by Karl-Ernst Osthaus in Hagen (later transferred to Essen).

Little attention was paid at this time to the considerable number of Van Gogh masterpieces already held by the Museum of Modern Art New York (established in 1929), along with the Tate Gallery in London and other British and American galleries.

== Art historians ==
In 1928, Jacob Baart de la Faille published the first catalogue raisonné of Van Gogh's works, comprising paintings as well as drawings and prints (and illustrating almost all of them) – a landmark in art history.

There has been a reaction against the depiction of Van Gogh as a saint. John Rewald was one of the first to attempt an anti-hagiography; books pointing to Van Gogh's neuroticism have continued since. Counterclaims, particularly based on Van Gogh's three volumes of letters, support Roger Fry's praise.

== Forgeries and reattribution ==
In winter 1927/1928, a problem began that has overshadowed Van Gogh research ever since—the emergence of forgeries. Otto Wacker staged an extensive exhibition of drawings by Van Gogh, catalogued and annotated by Julius Meier-Graefe. Then in January 1928, Paul Cassirer opened a large retrospective of paintings, from which two were removed just before the opening, as their authenticity had been questioned. The suspect paintings had been provided by Otto Wacker, and a scandal ensued.

In 2007, it was concluded by a team of specialists from the Van Gogh Museum in Amsterdam that the painting Head of a Man, attributed to Van Gogh for over 70 years, was not by him, but was painted by one of his peers. The team determined that the style was inconsistent with Van Gogh's other works, and there was no mention of the painting in any of Van Gogh's known letters. There is no evidence to suggest that the painting was intentionally created as a fake Van Gogh.

In February 2010, the Museum de Fundatie in the Dutch city of Zwolle discovered it owned a Van Gogh painting made in 1886, the Le Blute-fin windmill, authenticated “beyond any doubt” by the Van Gogh Museum in Amsterdam. The museum's founder Dirk Hannema (1895–1984), who bought the anonymous painting from a Parisian art dealer in 1975 for 6,500 francs (less than 1,000 euros), was always convinced it was a Van Gogh and insured it for a sum equivalent to 35,000 euros. However, as managing director of Rotterdam’s Museum Boijmans in 1938, Hannema had purchased a number of paintings that were attributed to Johannes Vermeer, that turned out to be forgeries.

== Theft ==
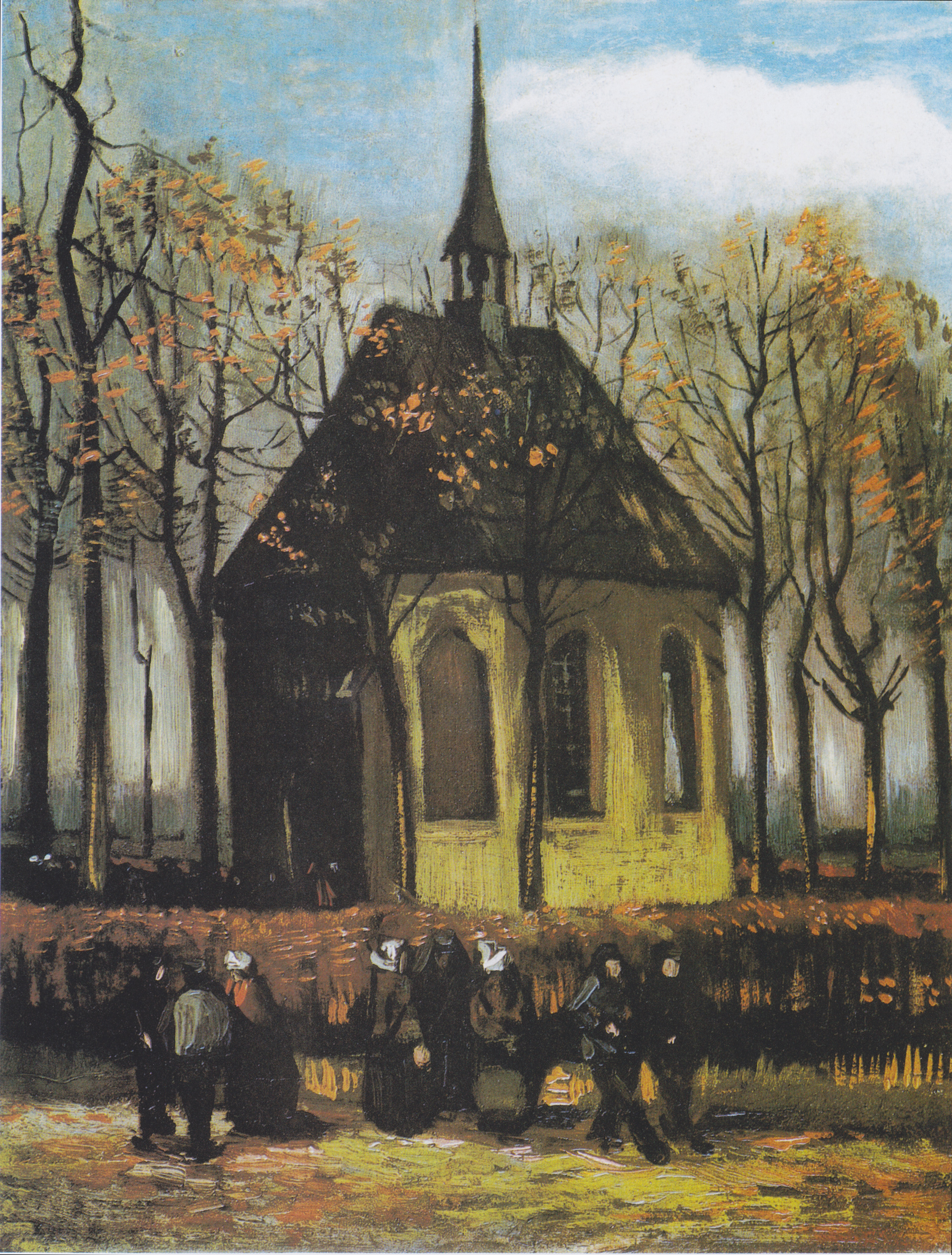
Congregation Leaving the Reformed Church in Nuenen (1884), painted by van Gogh for his mother

Since 1937, when the Nazis confiscated his paintings in Germany, more than 40 of van Gogh's works have been stolen, in at least 15 separate incidents, at galleries across the world.

In December 2002, two paintings were stolen from the Van Gogh Museum in Amsterdam; Beach at Scheveningen in Stormy Weather (1882) which was van Gogh's first work in oil, and Congregation Leaving the Reformed Church in Nuenen which was for his mother and later altered after the death of his father. The theft was undertaken by a professional burglar Octave Durham and an accomplice. In 2016 both works were eventually recovered in Castellammare di Stabia, near Pompeii, from a member of the Italian Camorra, Raffaele Imperiale.

On February 10, 2008, van Gogh's Blossoming Chestnut Branches, along with three other paintings, valued at more than $163 million, were stolen from the E.G. Buehrle Collection, a private museum in Zürich, Switzerland, by three armed men.

== New painting discovery ==
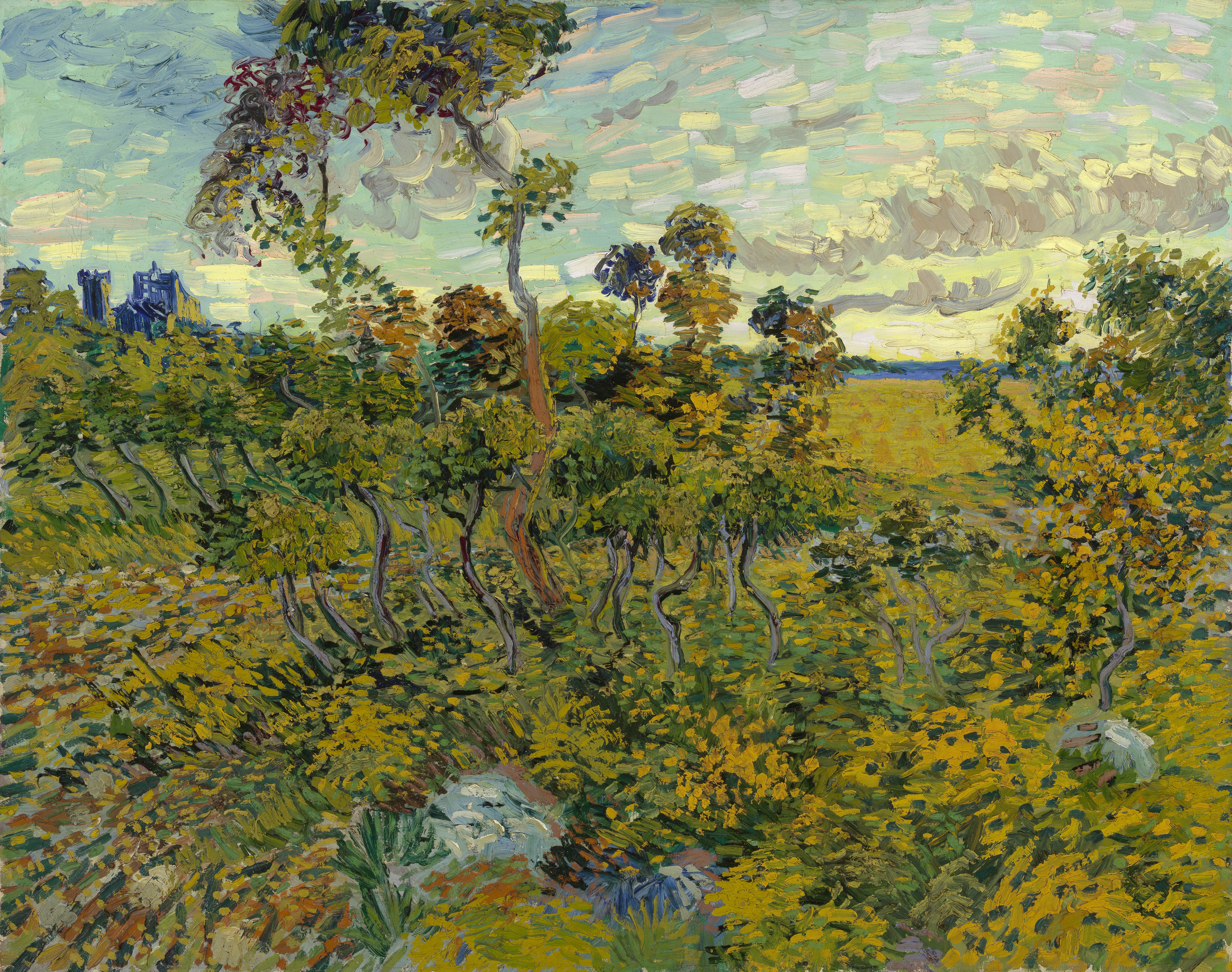
Sunset at Montmajour

On September 9, 2013, the Van Gogh Museum unveiled a long-lost painting that spent years in a Norwegian attic believed to be by another painter. It is the first full-size canvas by him discovered since 1928. Sunset at Montmajour depicts trees, bushes and sky, painted with Van Gogh's familiar thick brush strokes. It can be dated to the exact day it was painted because he described it in a letter to his brother, Theo, and said he painted it the previous day July 4, 1888.

== In popular culture ==
Van Gogh's life and depression is portrayed in the 1971 song "Vincent (Starry Starry Night)", written by Don McLean. McLean said that he wrote the song after being moved when reading a biography of van Gogh that portrayed his hard life.

Various aspects of van Gogh's life have been portrayed in several film features including Lust for Life (1956) with Kirk Douglas in the title role, Vincent (1987), Vincent & Theo (1990), Vincent and Me (1990), Dreams (1990), and Van Gogh (1991). Dreams was directed by Akira Kurosawa and featured Martin Scorsese in a vignette portraying van Gogh during his last year while painting wheat fields. At Eternity's Gate (2018) is a drama film about the final days of the painter. It is directed by Julian Schnabel and stars Willem Dafoe as van Gogh. For his performance, Dafoe received nominations for the Academy Award for Best Actor and the Golden Globe Award for Best Actor – Motion Picture Drama.

Puerto Rican author Giannina Braschi mentions Van Gogh cutting his ear off in her Spanglish novel Yo-Yo Boing!, and cites Van Gogh's paintings in her poetry collection Empire of Dreams.

At least four contemporary novelists have focused on the women Van Gogh knew and painted in his final days at Auvers-sur-Oise. Alyson Richman in The Last Van Gogh (2006) has Marguerite Gachet, daughter of the doctor, recount her love affair with the artist in his last three months. Three others use the fictional diary form. In French jurist and novelist Jean-Michel Guenassia's La valse des arbres et du soleil (2016), the aged Marguerite finally makes public her journal detailing her relationship with Van Gogh, The American poet and novelist Jerrine Wire gives a different version of the love story through Marguerite's daily diary entries in Vincent: The Secret Diary of Marguerite Gachet (2022, not yet released). A 2011 novel for young adults, Journal d'Adeline: un été avec Van Gogh by art historian Marie Sellier, is the imagined diary of Adeline Ravoux, daughter of the landlord at the inn where Van Gogh spent his last months.

In the British science fiction series Doctor Who, van Gogh is portrayed by Scottish actor Tony Curran. Upon release, "Vincent and the Doctor" (one of two episodes in which van Gogh appears) received positive reviews, with many praising Curran's portrayal of the artist.

Loving Vincent is a 2017 experimental animated biographical drama film about van Gogh's life and in particular, the circumstances surrounding his death. The world's first fully painted feature film, each one of its 65,000 frames was hand-painted by 125 professional painters, including a re-imagining of over 120 of Van Gogh's own works. The film won Best Animated Feature Film Award at the 30th European Film Awards in Berlin and the Best Animation Award at the Shanghai International Film Festival, as well as being nominated for Best Animated Feature at the 90th Academy Awards.

In August 2018 the retail brand Vans produced, in partnership with the Van Gogh Museum of Art, a line of products centered around a handful of the artist's works. Proceeds of the sales were given to the museum to "preserve Van Gogh's legacy and collection of art... keeping it accessible for generations." Within five minutes of the collection launching online, however, it was all sold out.

== See also ==
- Vincent van Gogh chronology
- List of people who achieved posthumous recognition
