= Les Choristes =

1877 pastel by Edgar Degas

- The Chorus, The Chorus Singers (English)
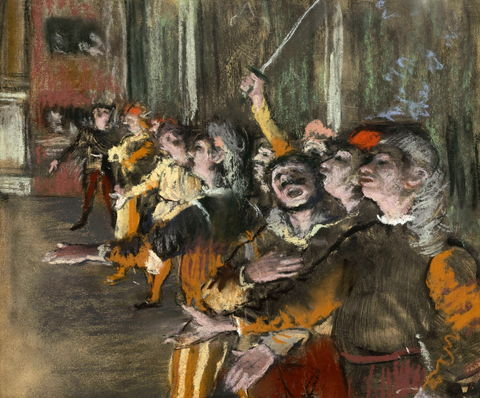
- Artist: Edgar Degas
- Year: 1877
- Catalogue: Lemoisne 420
- Medium: Pastel on monotype
- Movement: Impressionism
- Subject: Chorus in an opera
- Dimensions: 27 cm × 32 cm (10.6 in × 12.6 in)
- Location: Musée d'Orsay, Paris
- Owner: French government
- Accession: RF 12259
- Preceded by: Women on the Terrace of a Café in the Evening
- Followed by: Dancer at the Barre

Les Choristes ("The Chorus" or "The Chorus Singers") is an 1877 pastel on monotype by French artist Edgar Degas. Part of a series of similar works depicting daily public entertainment at the time, it shows a group of singers performing a scene from the opera Don Giovanni, the only work by Degas depicting an operatic performance without dancers.

Les Choristes, and other contemporary works of the artist such as Café-Concert at Les Ambassadeurs, show the influence of French caricaturists of the era. Honoré Daumier is often invoked, but critics and art historians have identified others. Critics at the time praised it, with one suggesting that the singers' "hideous" faces made them seem more real.

After its initial exhibition, Les Choristes was purchased by Gustave Caillebotte, a fellow painter and friend of Degas's who used his own large inheritance to support fellow Impressionists. Caillebotte bequeathed it to the state upon his death in 1894, which added it to the collection of the Musée du Luxembourg in Paris, and then later exhibited it at the Louvre. In 1986 it was moved to the Musée d'Orsay with other works of modern art.

At the end of 2009, while on loan to the Musée Cantini in Marseille, the work was stolen. Investigators were unable to find any leads. It was recovered in 2018 when customs inspectors found it in the luggage compartment of a bus they searched in the department of Seine-et-Marne outside Paris; the thieves have not been identified. After being found to be relatively undamaged, it was displayed again at the Musée d'Orsay.

== Description ==
The work is a pastel drawn over an earlier monotype, a technique Degas used for some other works around this time, also depicting performers. While some of them led to multiple works, Les Choristes is the only one known to have been derived from this particular monotype. It is rectangular, almost square, 27 centimetres (11 in) high by 32 centimetres (13 in) wide.

It depicts a line of singers along a stage, seen from just to their left and slightly in front. They are illuminated by footlights from in front. All have open mouths; most also have a hand extended towards the audience. The exceptions are the third singer, who seems to be reaching back towards his chest, and the fourth singer behind him, who appears to be raising a sword. They are wearing predominantly orange and yellow costumes.

The faces of the singers in the foreground are distinct, although lacking detail, reflecting the Impressionist aesthetic of the work. In the very background two box seats can be seen overlooking the stage, with patrons, one above the other on a red wall. Degas signed the image at lower left.

Degas told Daniel Halévy that the scene depicted is one from a specific opera, Mozart's Don Giovanni. Specifically, it is the end of the first act, with the chorus celebrating the engagement of Massetto and Zerlina. While other works by Degas depict operatic performances, this is the only one that shows only singers, without any dancers.

Don Giovanni had not been performed much in Paris until 1866, when Jean-Baptiste Faure, who had commissioned works from Degas, was able to apply his baritone to the title role, after which there were many productions. At the time of Les Choristes, Degas had also illustrated Halévy's father Ludovic's Monsieur Cardinal, which takes place backstage during a performance of the opera. Several of those illustrations depicted dancers preparing for, or in, other scenes from Don Giovanni.

== Reception and analysis ==
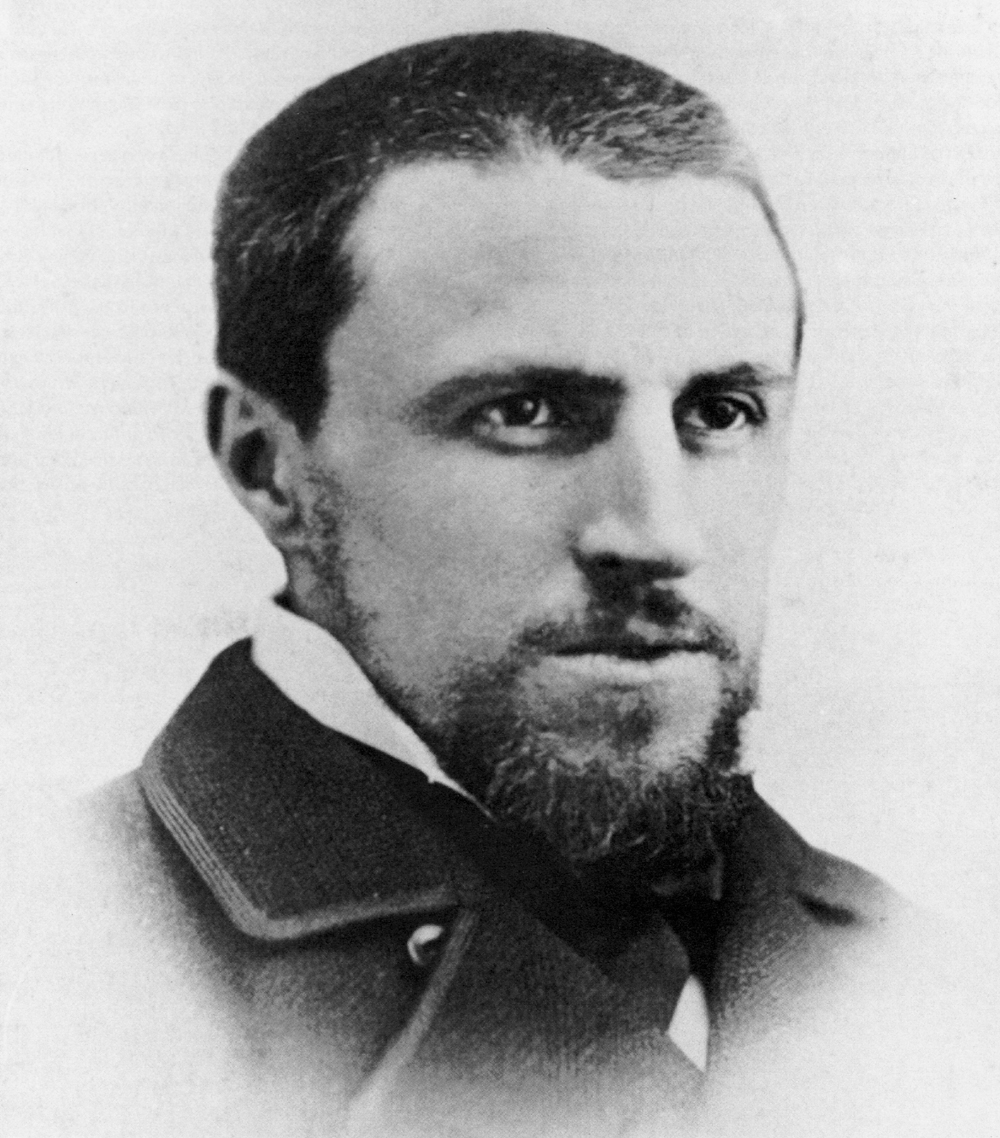
Caillebotte, the first owner of Les Choristes, around 1878

Gustave Caillebotte, a painter who used his large inheritance to support many of the early Impressionists, bought the work from Degas and lent it to the Third Impressionist Exhibition in 1877, soon after it was finished. The title was shortened to simply Choristes. Critics at the time saw it as furthering Degas's place as the Impressionist most concerned with realism in his choice of subjects and representation. "And the hideous chorus, bawling in full voice," wrote one admirer, "aren't they real!"

Many critics, looking at all of Degas's work in the show, saw the strong influence of caricature on his work. In particular, they compared his figurative stylings to Honoré Daumier, whom Degas admired to the point of owning several of his works. La Petite Republique Française went further, comparing Les Choristes and other paintings depicting performers offstage and on—Café-Concert and Dancers at the Barre among them—favorably with the work of Paul Gavarni and Alfred Grévin. "No one, including [them], has seen the world of the wings and the café-concert in as humorous a fashion", the journal wrote. "[The works] are a collection of true and witty satire."

Appreciation for the work, as part of those Degas showed in 1877, did not diminish with the passage of time. In 1897, when the work was put on exhibit at the Musée du Luxembourg, Léonce Bénédite called Les Choristes part of a group of "acute, ironic and cruel observations ... the work of a firm, sure hand [and] just, sensible eye." He called them "little masterpieces" that a public not generally aware of Degas's genius had done well to acquire.

== History ==
After the show ended, Caillebotte took Les Choristes back into his private collection. He lent it out for one other exhibit, another show focusing on the Impressionists, in New York in 1886. In this exhibit it went under the title Chorus d'Opéra.

At his death eight years later, he left all his art to the state, and Les Choristes was exhibited at the Musée du Luxembourg. During World War I, it was again included in American traveling exhibits, this time to San Francisco, Pittsburgh and Buffalo. After being included in a Degas retrospective in 1924, was transferred to the Louvre in 1929.

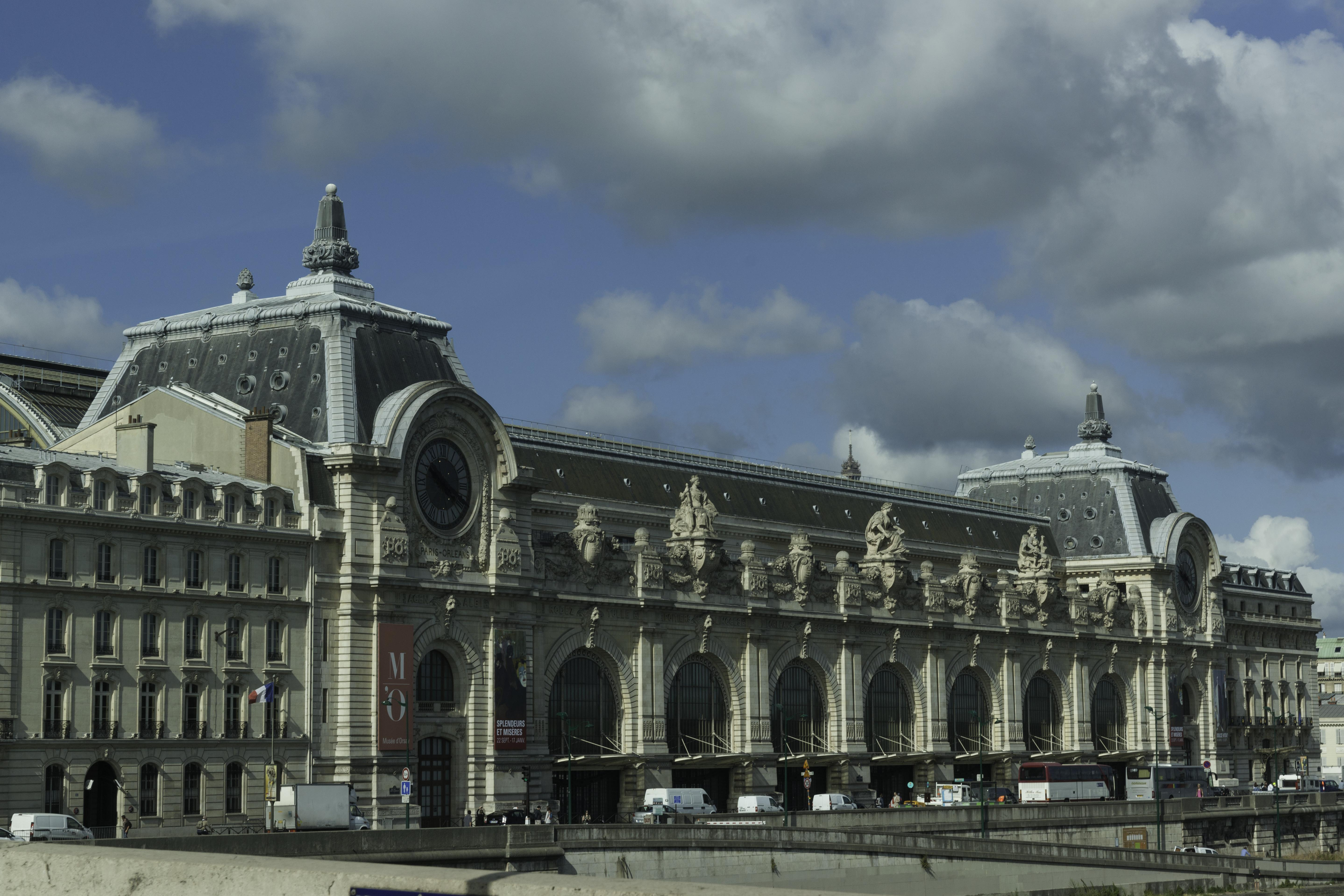
The Musée d'Orsay

For the next 80 years Les Choristes did not leave Paris. It was part of several different exhibits devoted to pastels and Impressionism at the Louvre, and then transferred to the newly opened Musée d'Orsay in 1986. It was part of a special exhibit of Degas works two years later.

=== Theft and recovery ===
In 2009 the Orsay loaned Les Choristes to the Musée Cantini in Marseille for "De la scène au tableau" ("The Scene in Painting"), a multi-artist exhibit. On the last morning of the year, shortly before the exhibit ended, the security guard who opened the museum for the day found the painting missing.

The thieves had apparently just unscrewed the frame and taken the work, valued at €800,000, off the wall. Investigators believed that, as in many cases of art theft, they had had some help from someone working at the museum. They detained and briefly interviewed a night watchman, but could find no reason to hold him, and released him. After that they had no leads.

It was serendipitously recovered a little over nine years later. On February 16, 2018, French customs officers pulled over and searched an intercity bus off an exit from the A4 autoroute in Ferrières-en-Brie, 30 kilometres (19 mi) east of Paris in the department of Seine-et-Marne. They were primarily looking for illegal drugs, since smugglers prefer bus routes to ship them.

They did not find any drugs on this occasion, but inside a suitcase in one of the luggage compartments was a small artwork; none of the passengers said it was theirs. They soon confirmed that it appeared to be the missing Les Choristes, although they did not know if it was authentic despite the Degas signature. Experts from the Orsay soon confirmed that it was, and it was undamaged.

Several days later, in a joint news release, the customs agency and the Ministry of Culture announced the recovery of Les Choristes. Culture Minister Françoise Nyssen praised the customs service for "the fortunate recovery of a precious work whose disappearance had been a great loss to our national Impressionist heritage." Gérald Darmanin, Minister of Public Action and Accounts, said "the constant vigilance of customs", which had seized 10,000 possibly stolen works of art during 2017, had again proved its value in protecting French heritage.

The previous year, the Orsay had marked the centenary of Degas's death with an exhibit of his work focusing on his relationship with Paul Valéry. The museum announced that it would include Les Choristes in an exhibit of the artist's work depicting opera, set to open in September 2019. After that, the exhibit will travel to Washington, D.C., where it will open at the National Gallery of Art in March 2020.

== See also ==
- Crime in France
- List of stolen paintings
- Count Lepic and His Daughters, another Degas work stolen and then recovered
