= Le Suicidé =

Painting by Édouard Manet

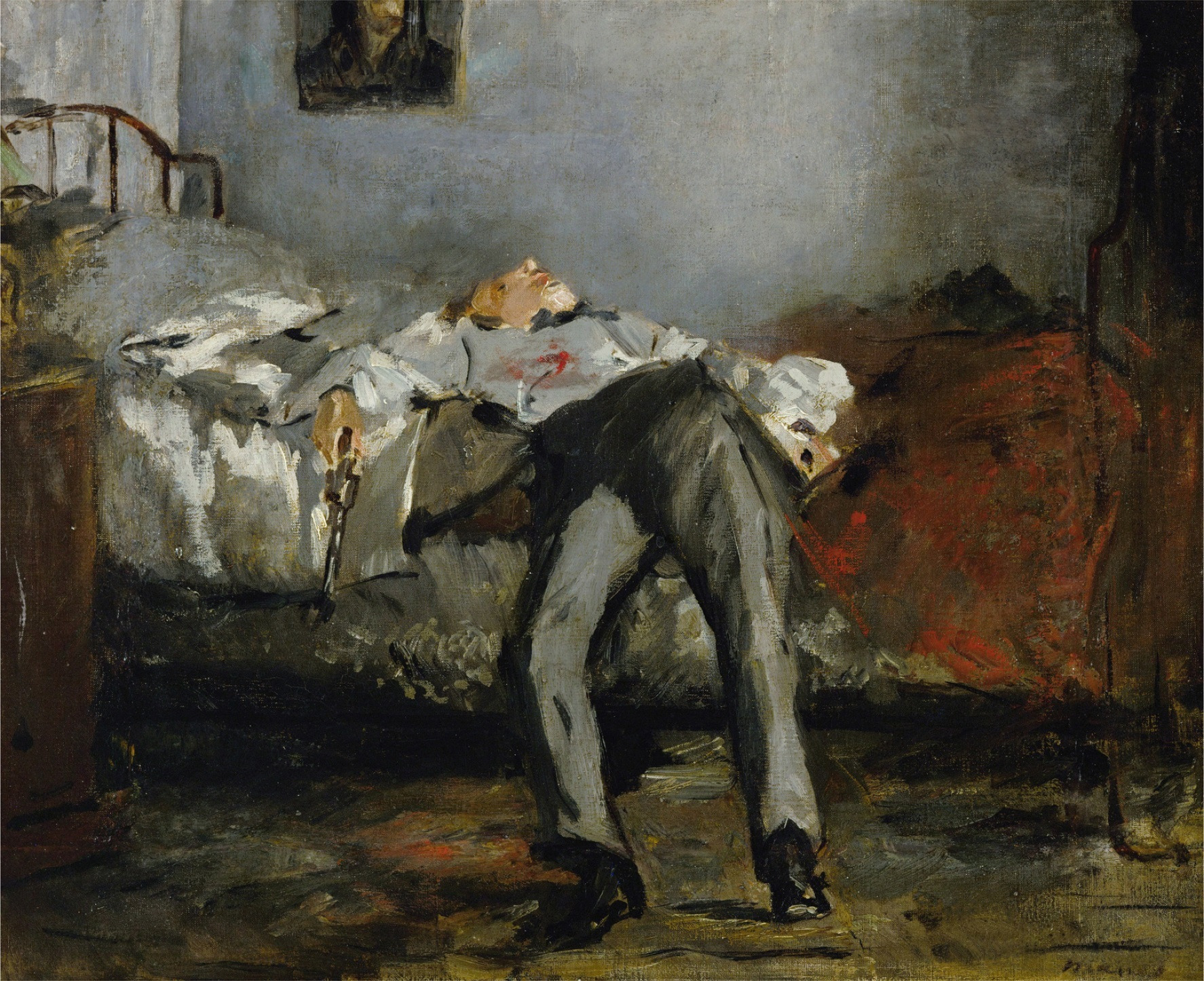
- Artist: Édouard Manet
- Year: c. 1877–1881
- Medium: Oil on canvas
- Subject: Suicide
- Dimensions: 38 cm × 46 cm (15 in × 18 in)
- Location: Foundation E.G. Bührle, Zurich

Le Suicidé (lit. 'the suicidee') is a small oil painting by Édouard Manet completed between 1877 and 1881. The painting has not been completely studied within Manet's oeuvre, as art historians have had difficulty finding a place for the work within the development of Manet's art.

== Painting ==
The pictorial content of the painting is limited to a man who appears to have just shot himself—still holding the gun while slouched on a bed—and a few pieces of furniture. Manet has removed the trappings of earlier depictions of suicide, and provided next to no narrative content or "moralizing tendency". Ulrike Ilg, an associate professor at University of Giessen, associates the painting with the realism of Gustave Courbet, noting that Courbet also used a depiction of death in his Burial at Ornans (1849–50), a work that Courbet later described as the beginning of his new artistic approach.

The realism of Le Suicidé has fueled speculation that it depicts an actual suicide, but the subject, if any, is not known. Speculation has concerned an assistant of Manet, a young man named Alexandre, who committed suicide in Manet's studio more than a decade earlier (though he hanged himself). Another suicide proposed to be connected with the painting was that of an artist, Jules Holtzapffel, whom Émile Zola had written about in 1866.

Manet's approach to this depiction may represent his continuing desire to break from academic tradition, in which a depiction of suicide could only fit within the genre of history painting—where death and suicide would be placed within a narrative associated with sacrifice, idealism, or heroism. Examples in the French language include The Death of Socrates (1787) by Jacques-Louis David, which depicts Socrates' choice to kill himself by hemlock rather than go into exile. There is no such grand statement underlying Manet's painting. The artist has not presented a clear time, place, or protagonist. The painting is plainly constructed rather than carefully styled. This departure from tradition would have been controversial with contemporary viewers.

== See also ==
- List of paintings by Édouard Manet
