= Ludovic Lepic and His Daughters =

Painting by Edgar Degas

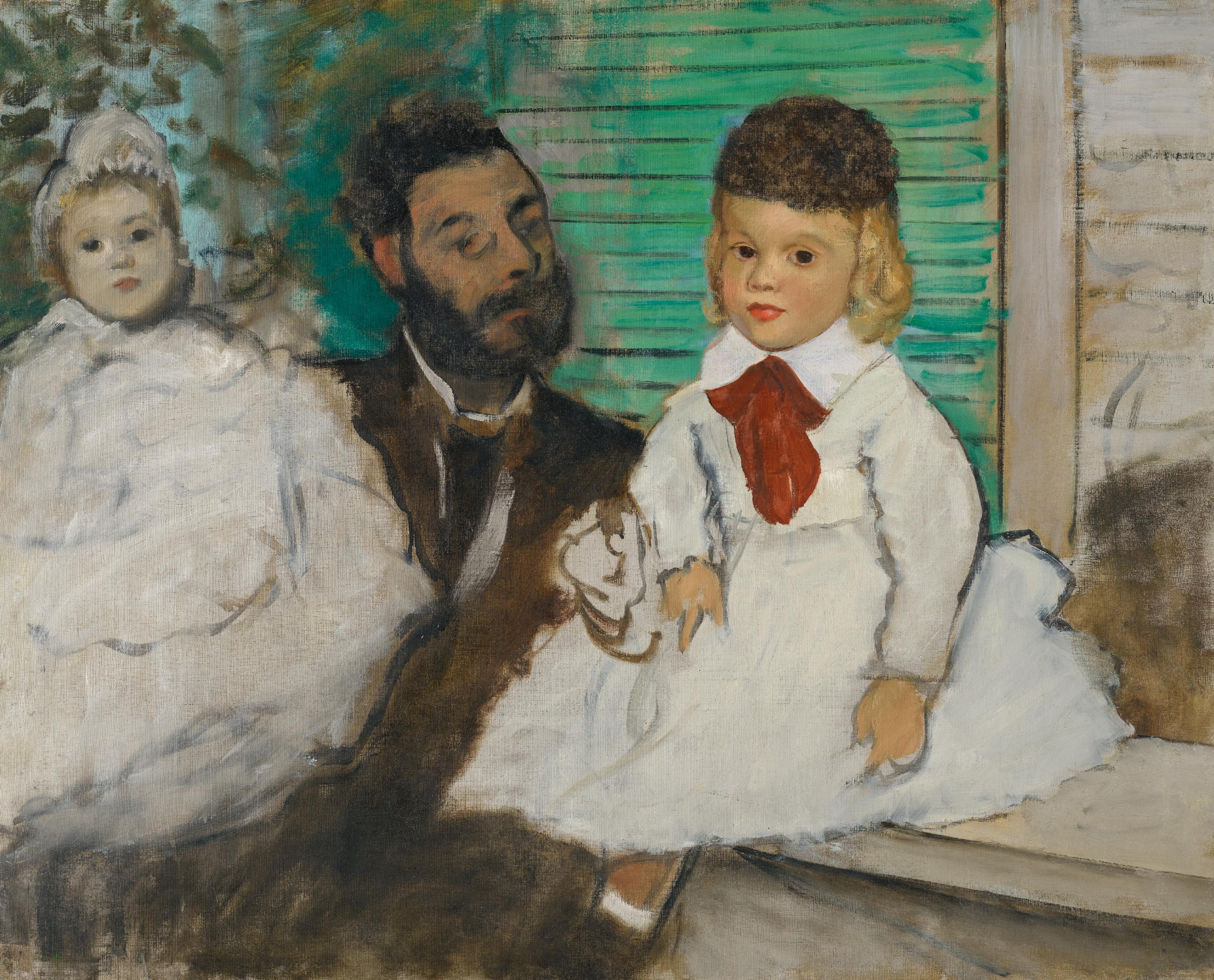
- Artist: Edgar Degas
- Year: c. 1871
- Medium: Oil on canvas
- Dimensions: 65 cm × 81 cm (26 in × 32 in)
- Location: Foundation E. G. Bührle, Zürich

Ludovic Lepic and His Daughters (French: Ludovic Lepic et ses filles) is an oil painting on canvas completed ca. 1871 by the French artist Edgar Degas. The painting depicts Ludovic-Napoléon Lepic with his young daughters, Eylau and Jeanine. Degas also depicted Ludovic Lepic in the painting Place de la Concorde.

On February 10, 2008, the painting was stolen from Foundation E.G. Bührle in Zürich, Switzerland. It was recovered in April 2012 with slight damage.

== See also ==
- List of stolen paintings
- Les Choristes, another Degas work stolen and then recovered
