= The Boy in the Red Vest =

Painting by Paul Cézanne

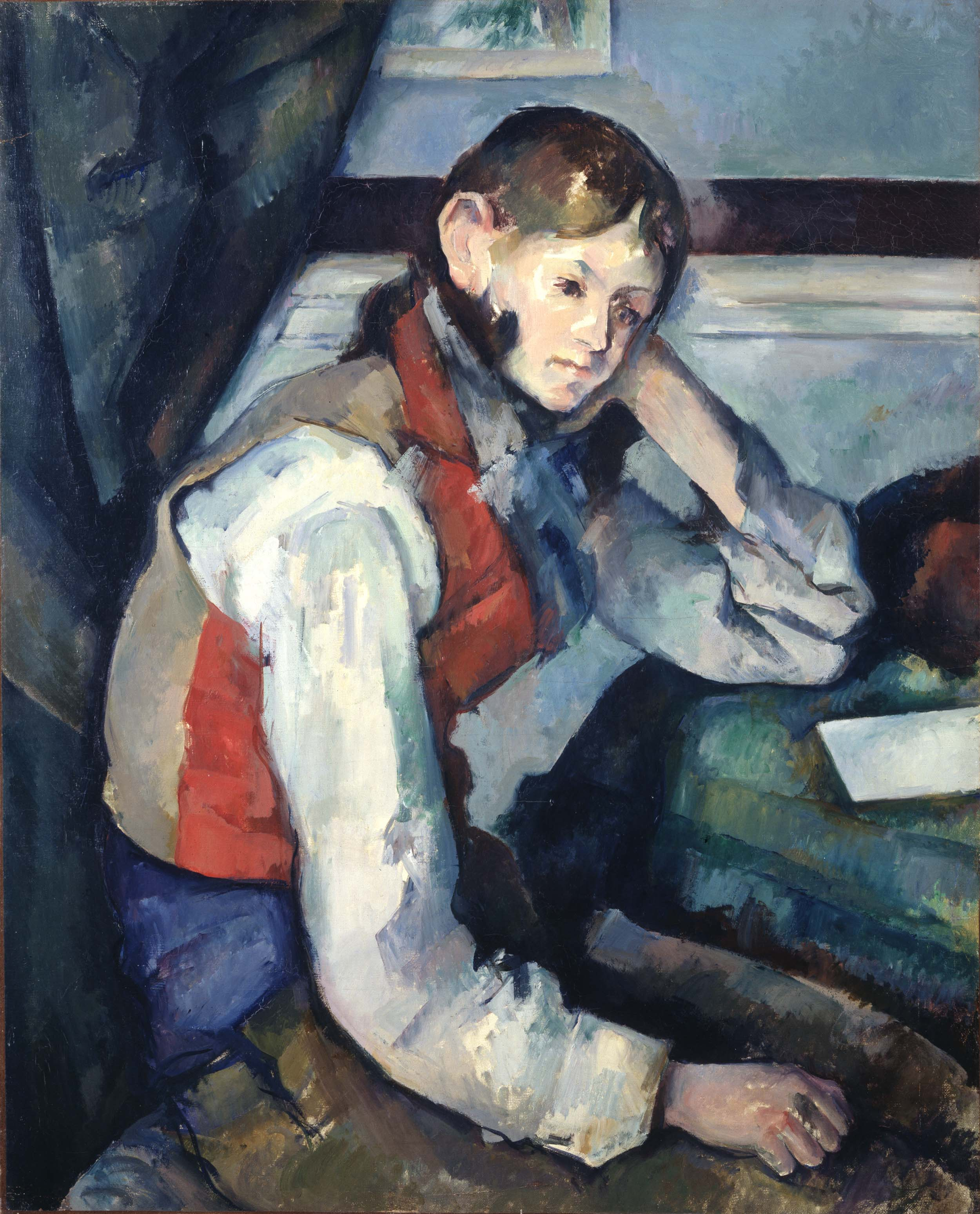
- Artist: Paul Cézanne
- Year: 1888–1890
- Type: oil
- Movement: Post Impressionism
- Dimensions: 80 cm × 64.5 cm (31 in × 25.4 in)
- Location: Foundation E.G. Bührle, Zürich

The Boy in the Red Vest (Le Garçon au gilet rouge), also known as The Boy in the Red Waistcoat, is an oil painting (Venturi 681) by Paul Cézanne, painted in 1888–1890. It is a fine example of Cézanne's skilled, nuanced, and innovative mature work after 1880.

In February 2008 the painting, valued at $91 million, was stolen from the E. G. Bührle Foundation in Zurich. It was recovered in Serbia in April 2012.

== History ==
Cézanne painted four oil portraits of this Italian boy in the red vest (in British English, a waistcoat), all in different poses, which allowed him to study the relationship between the figure and space. The most famous of the four, and the one commonly referred to by this title, is the one which depicts the boy in a melancholic seated pose with his elbow on a table and his head cradled in his hand. It is currently held in Zürich, Switzerland. The other three portraits, of different poses, are in museums in the US.

The Foundation E.G. Bührle, which currently owns the work, notes the painting's picturesqueness, and "a perfect balance here of high compositional intelligence and spontaneous painterly intuition." In 1895, art critic Gustave Geffroy said it could stand comparison with the finest figure paintings of the Old Masters.

The colors of the painting are rich, dense, and festive. The composition is organized with three main diagonals: the angle of the boy's tilted back and head, the angle of the deep-green curtain behind the boy, and the long angle of the seat and table rising from the lower left. These three angles are countered by the angles of the boy's thighs and arms, creating a tightly articulated structure of intersecting diagonals.

This painting was acquired from Cézanne by art dealer Ambroise Vollard, probably in 1895, and successively acquired by art collectors Marcell Nemes in 1909 and Gottlieb Reber in 1913. Art collector and patron Emil Georg Bührle purchased it from Reber in 1948. Following Bührle's death in 1956, his heirs donated the painting to the Foundation E.G. Bührle in 1960.

In February 2008, the painting was stolen from the Foundation E.G. Bührle in Zurich. It was the museum's most valuable painting and was valued at $91 million. It was recovered in Serbia in April 2012.

== Other three paintings ==
Other oil paintings in the series, painted by the artist under the same title during the same period, are:

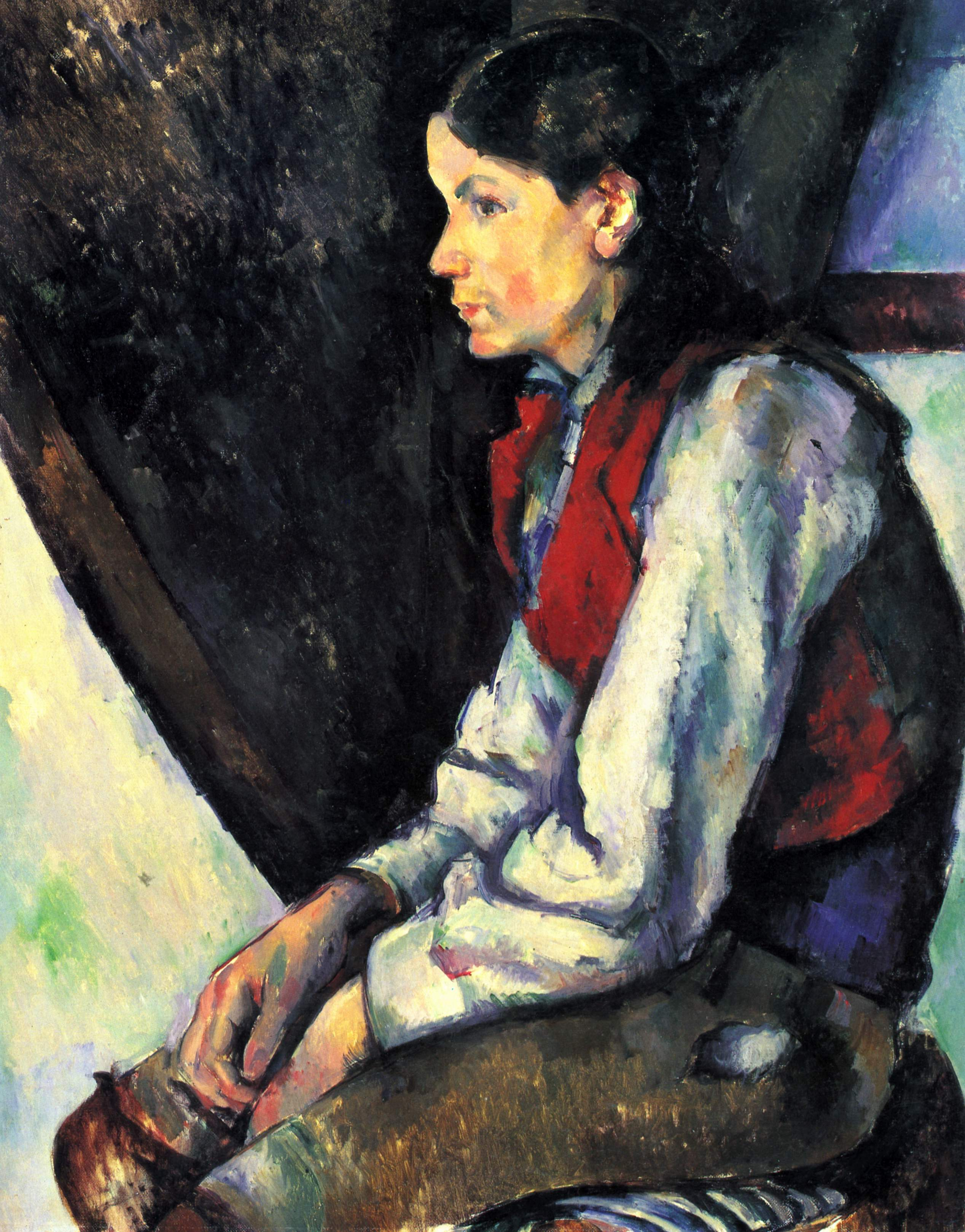
Museum of Modern Art, New York

National Gallery of Art, Washington D.C.

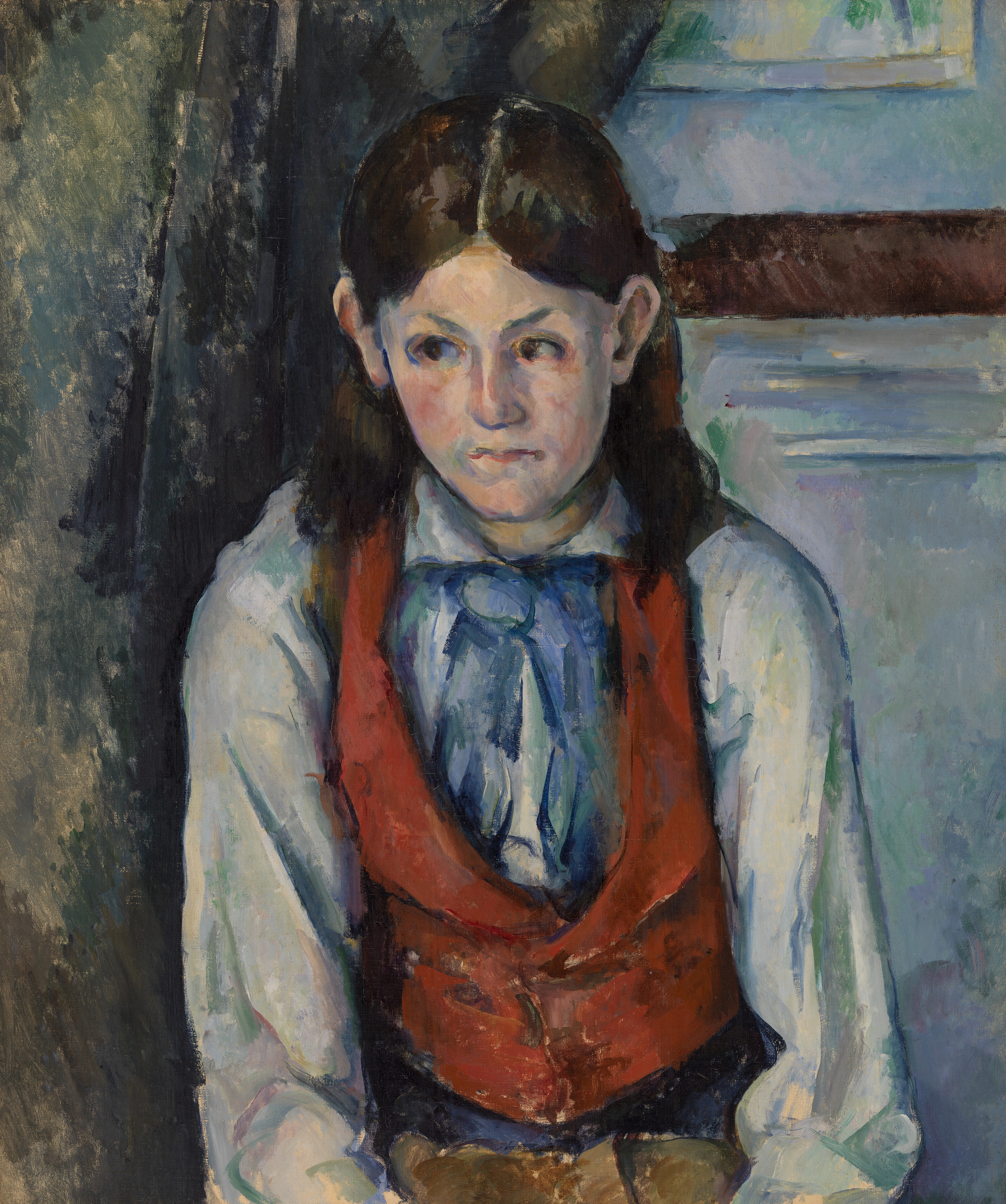
Barnes Foundation, Philadelphia

== See also ==
- List of paintings by Paul Cézanne
