= Foundation E. G. Bührle =

Foundation E. G. Bührle Collection
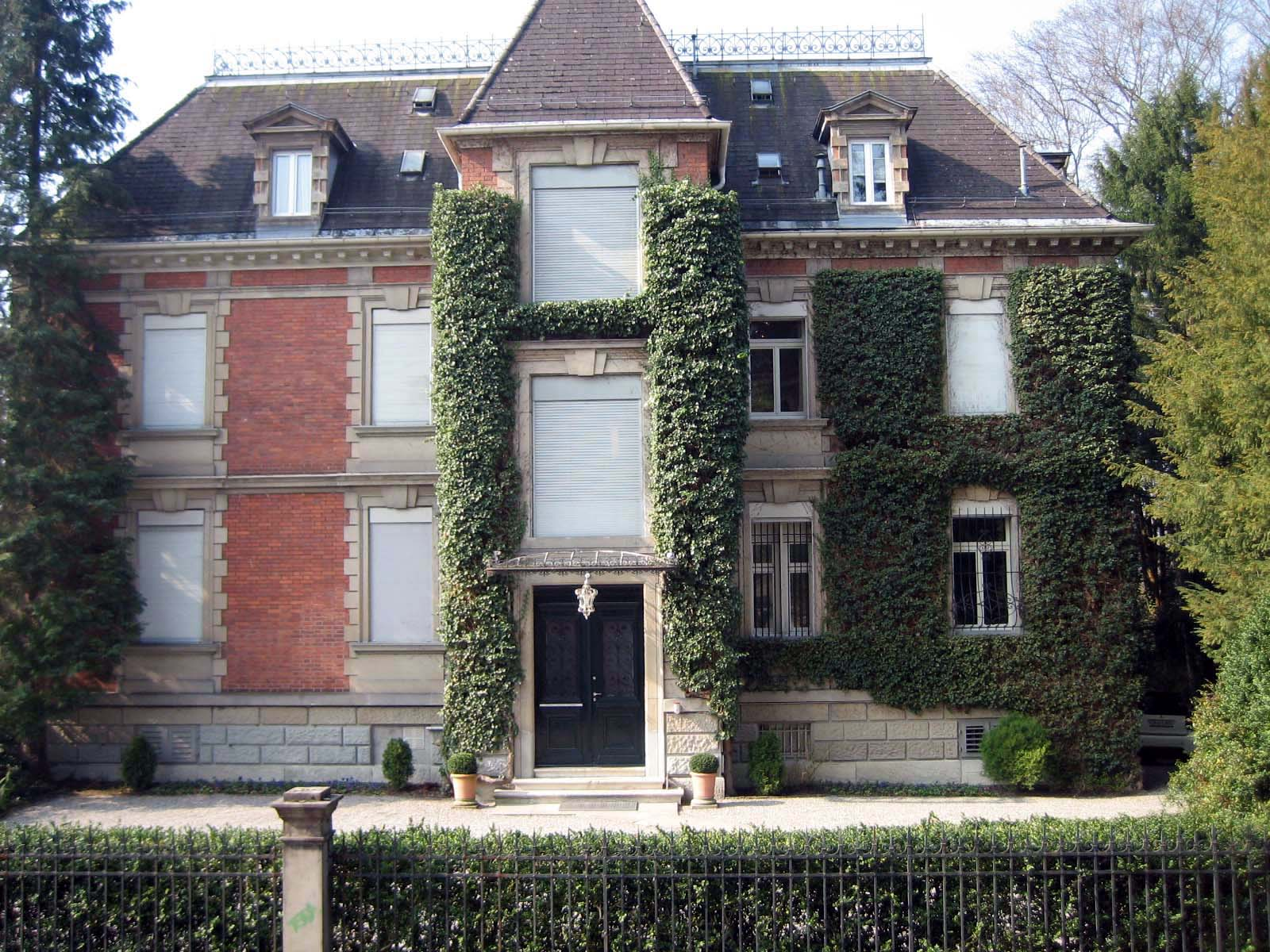
- Established: 1960
- Location: Zürich, Switzerland
- Coordinates: 47°21′11″N 8°33′42″E
- Type: Art museum
- Director: Lukas Gloor
- Website: https://buehrle.ch

The Foundation E. G. Bührle Collection (Stiftung Sammlung E. G. Bührle) is an art museum in Zurich, Switzerland. It was established by the Bührle family to make Emil Georg Bührle's collection of European sculptures and paintings available to the public. The museum is in a villa adjoining Bührle's former home. In 2021 many works were exhibited on 20-year loan in almost a whole floor of the new extension of the Kunsthaus Zürich museum. There was controversy due to suspicions that many works were looted from Jews by Nazi Germany. The foundation was managed for decades by Bührle's son Dieter, who was sentenced to a conditional prison term of 8 months in 1970 for supplying weapons to the racist apartheid regime in South Africa.

== Collections ==
Although the collection includes a number of Old Masters and Modern art including works by Pierre Bonnard, Georges Braque, Henri Matisse, and Pablo Picasso, it comprises mainly French Impressionism and Post-Impressionism paintings by Paul Cézanne, Edgar Degas, Paul Gauguin, Édouard Manet, Claude Monet, Camille Pissarro, Pierre-Auguste Renoir, Georges Seurat, Alfred Sisley, Henri de Toulouse-Lautrec, Vincent van Gogh and others.

== Connections to Nazi Germany ==
Bührle bought his gothic sculptures in the shop of Benno Griebert, a member of Hitler's party NSDAP and ardent Nazi supporter. Bührle was only able to acquire his art collection with profits from the sale of weapons worth 623 million francs to Adolf Hitler's army. The arms business with the Nazis made him the richest man in Switzerland.

== Gallery ==
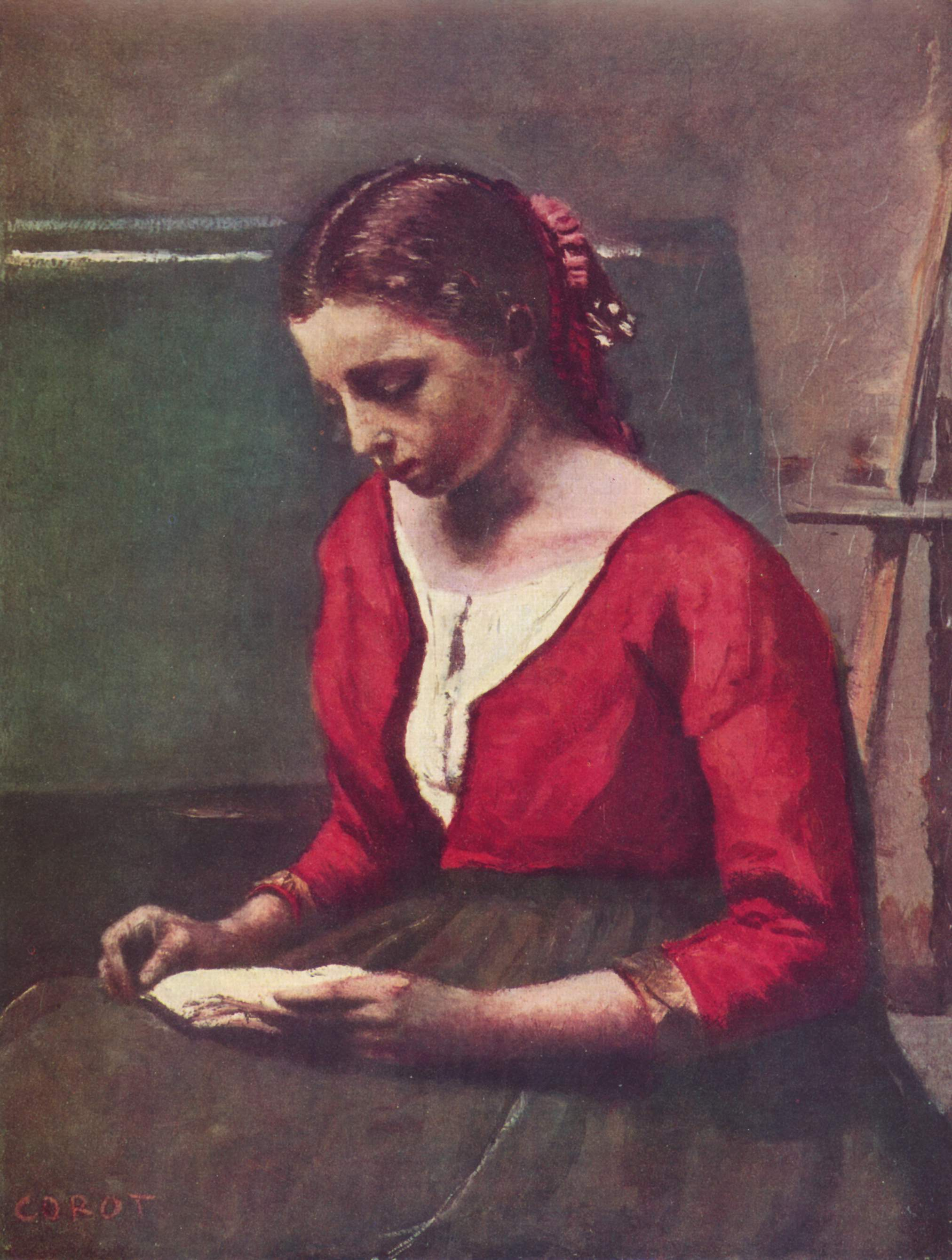
Jean-Baptiste-Camille Corot, A Girl Reading, 1845–1850

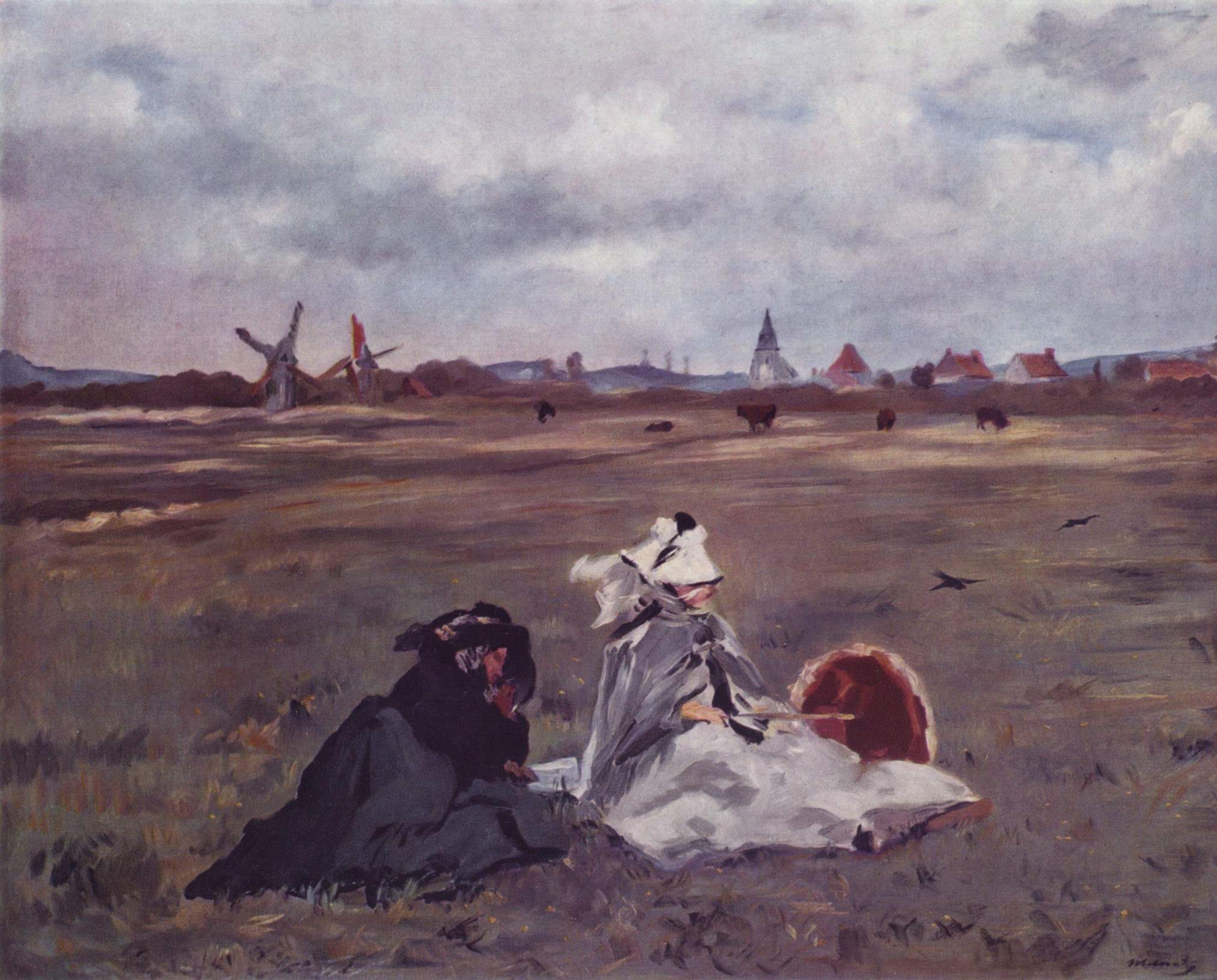
Édouard Manet, The Swallows, 1873

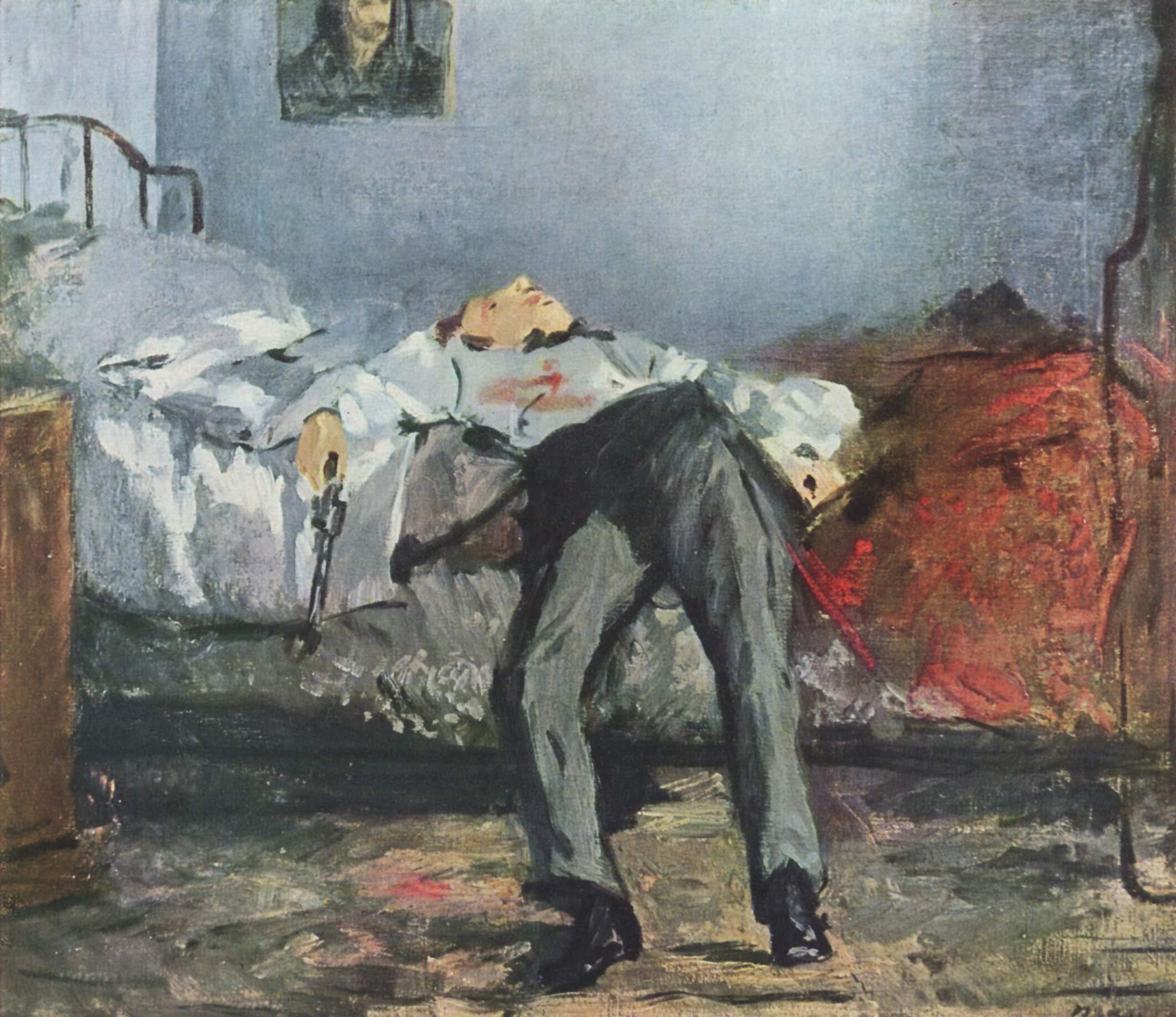
Édouard Manet, The Suicide, 1877–1881

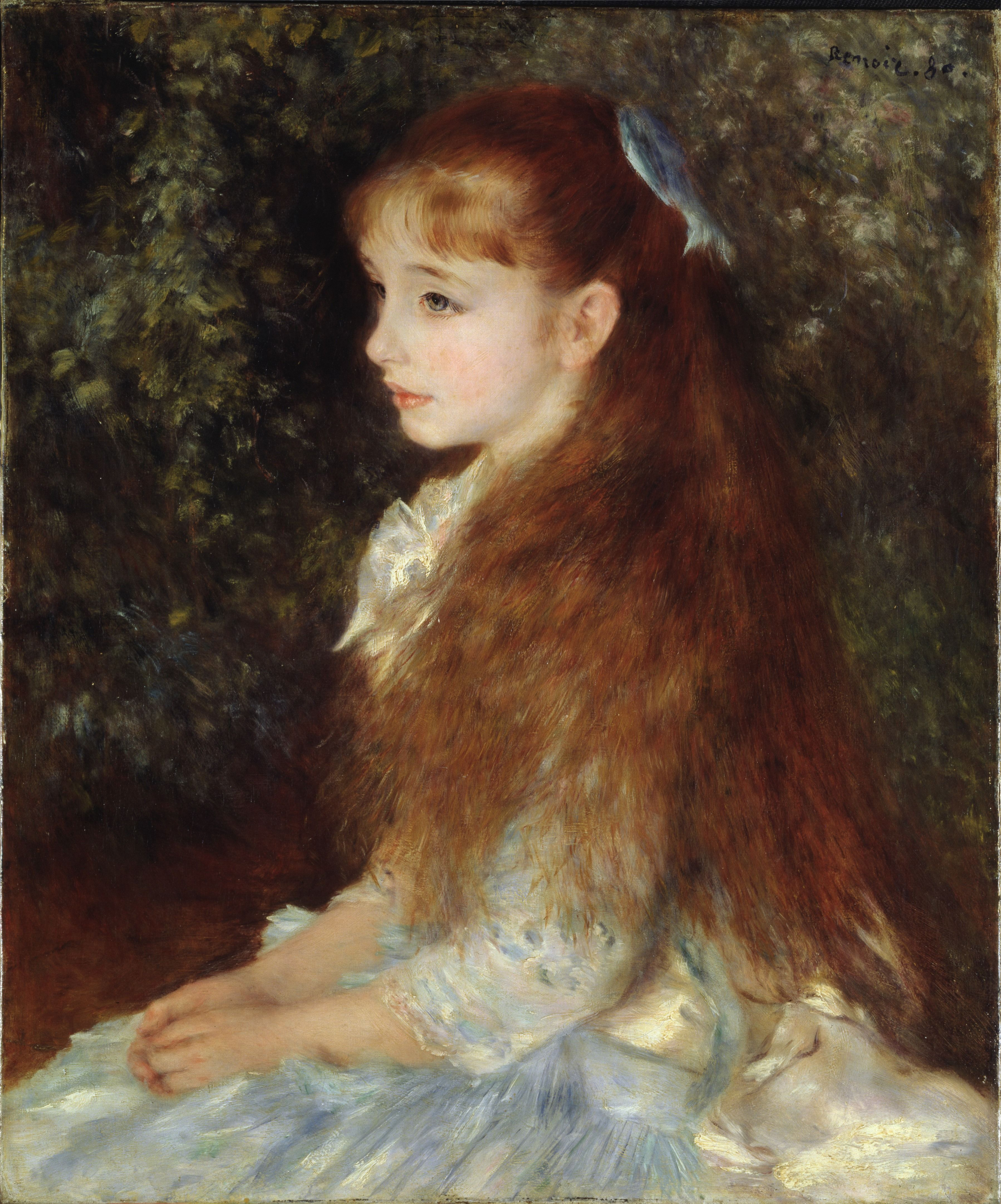
Pierre-Auguste Renoir, Portrait of Irène Cahen d'Anvers, 1880

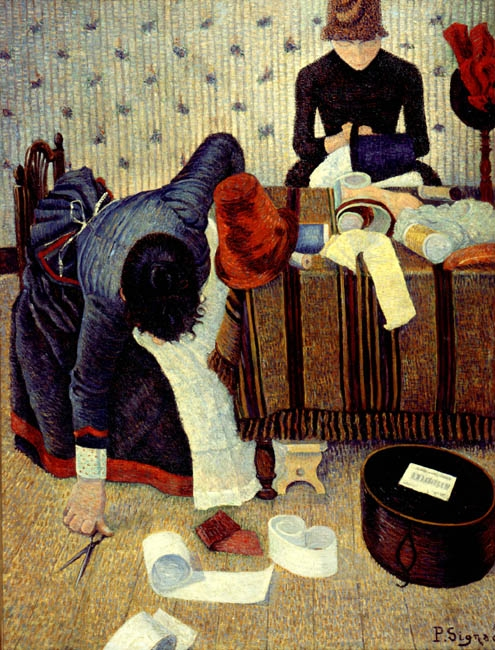
Paul Signac, Two Milliners in the Rue du Caire, 1885–1886

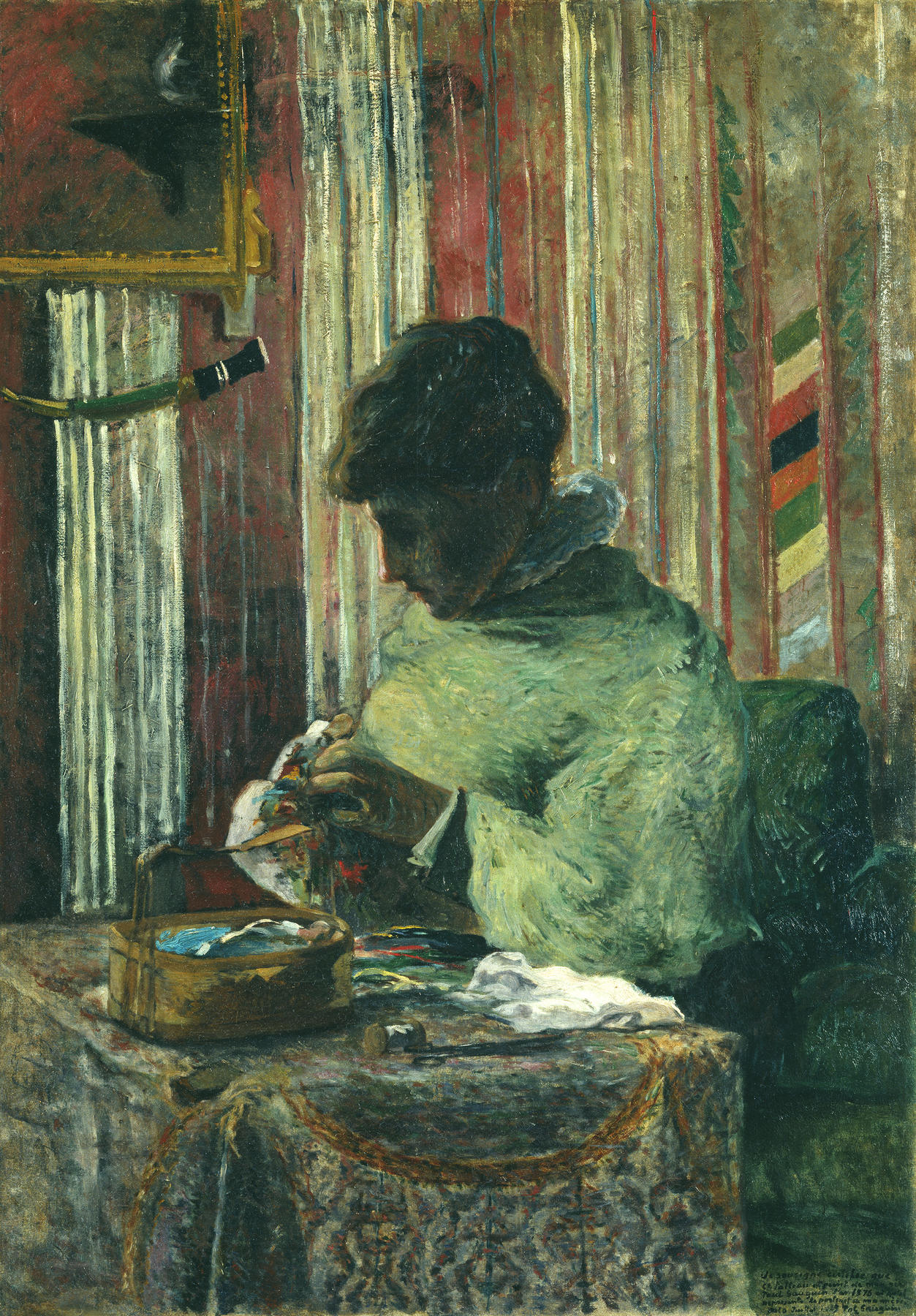
Paul Gauguin, The Embroiderer (La Brodeuse), 1880

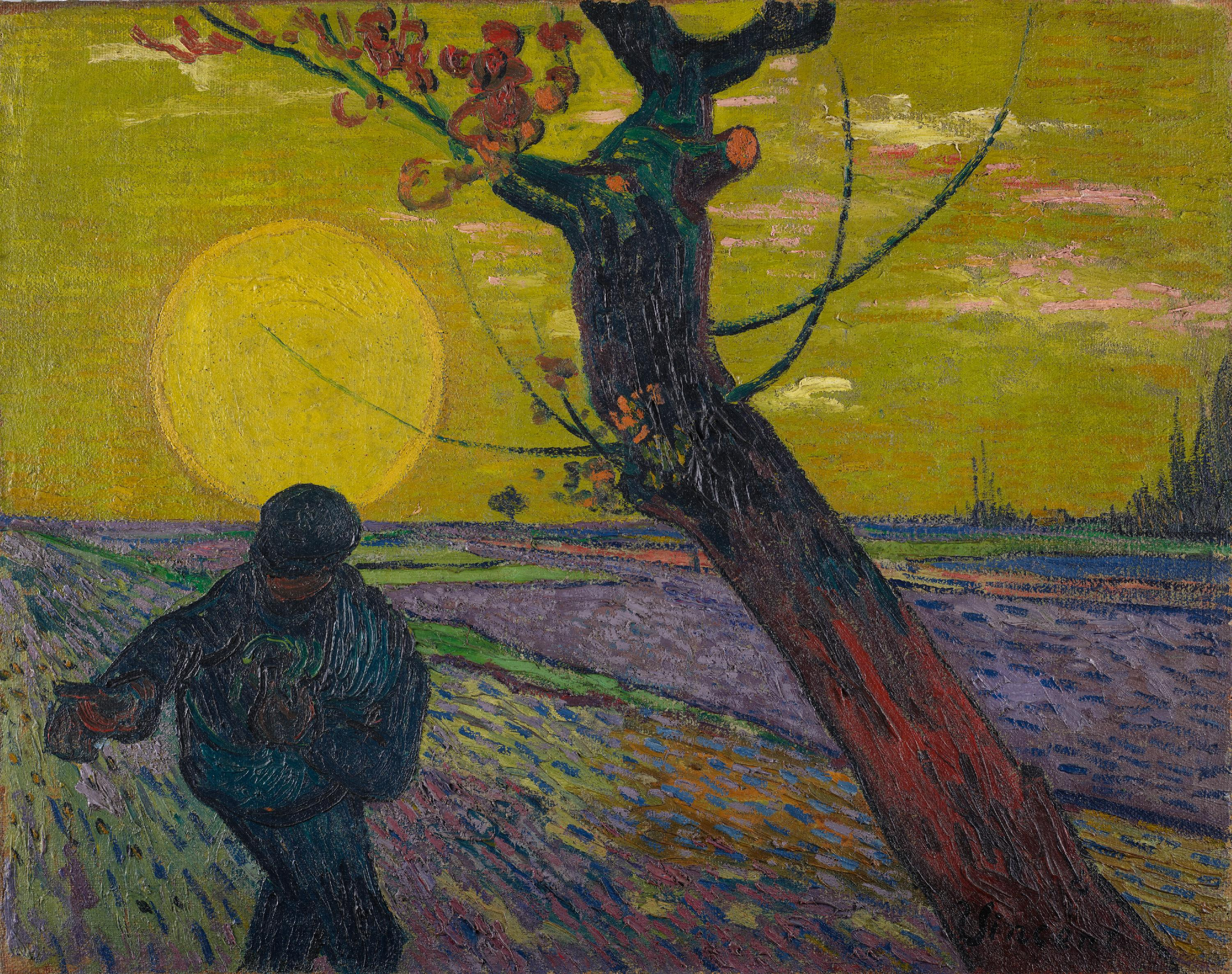
Vincent van Gogh, The Sower (after Millet), 1888

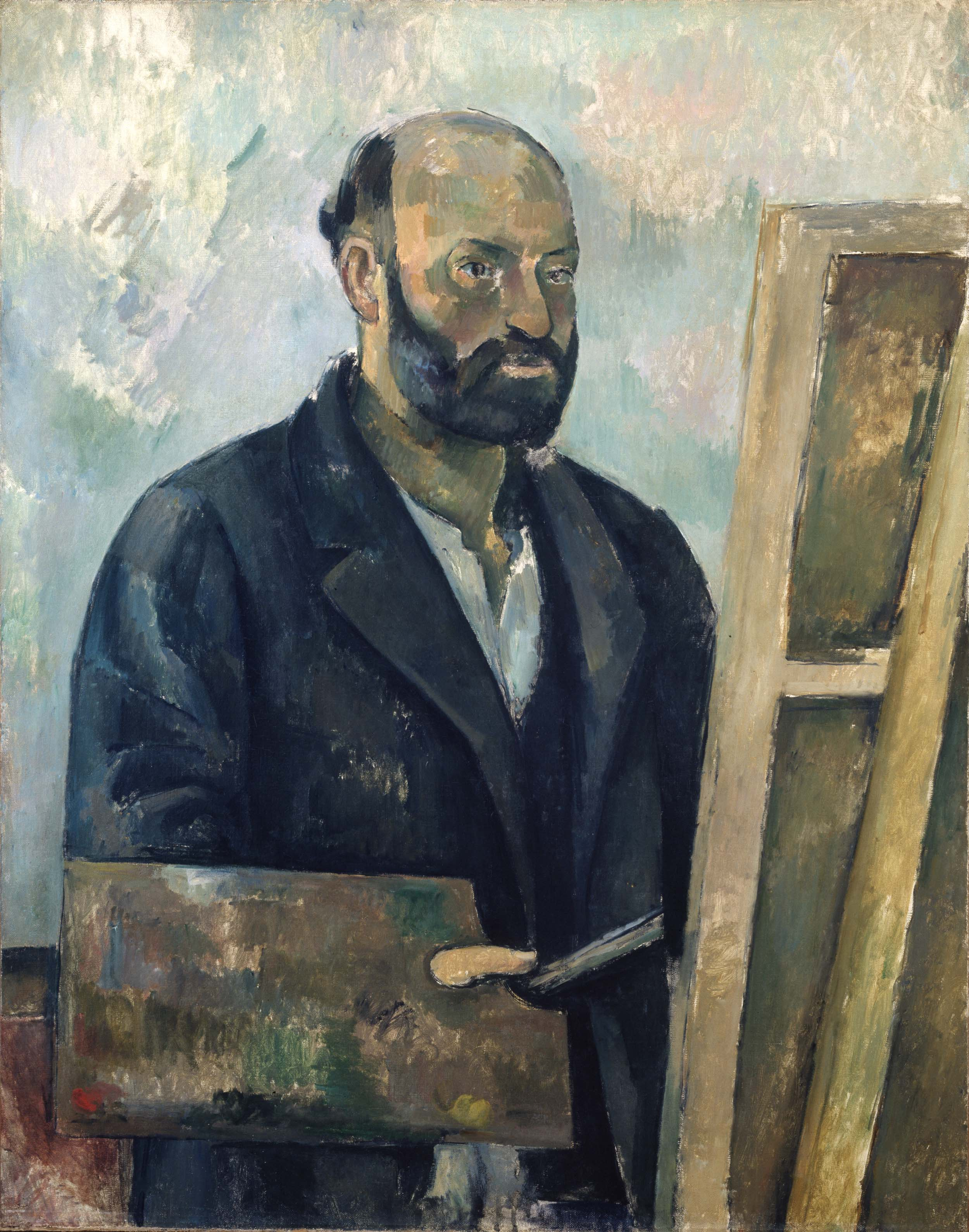
Paul Cézanne, Self-Portrait with Palette, 1890

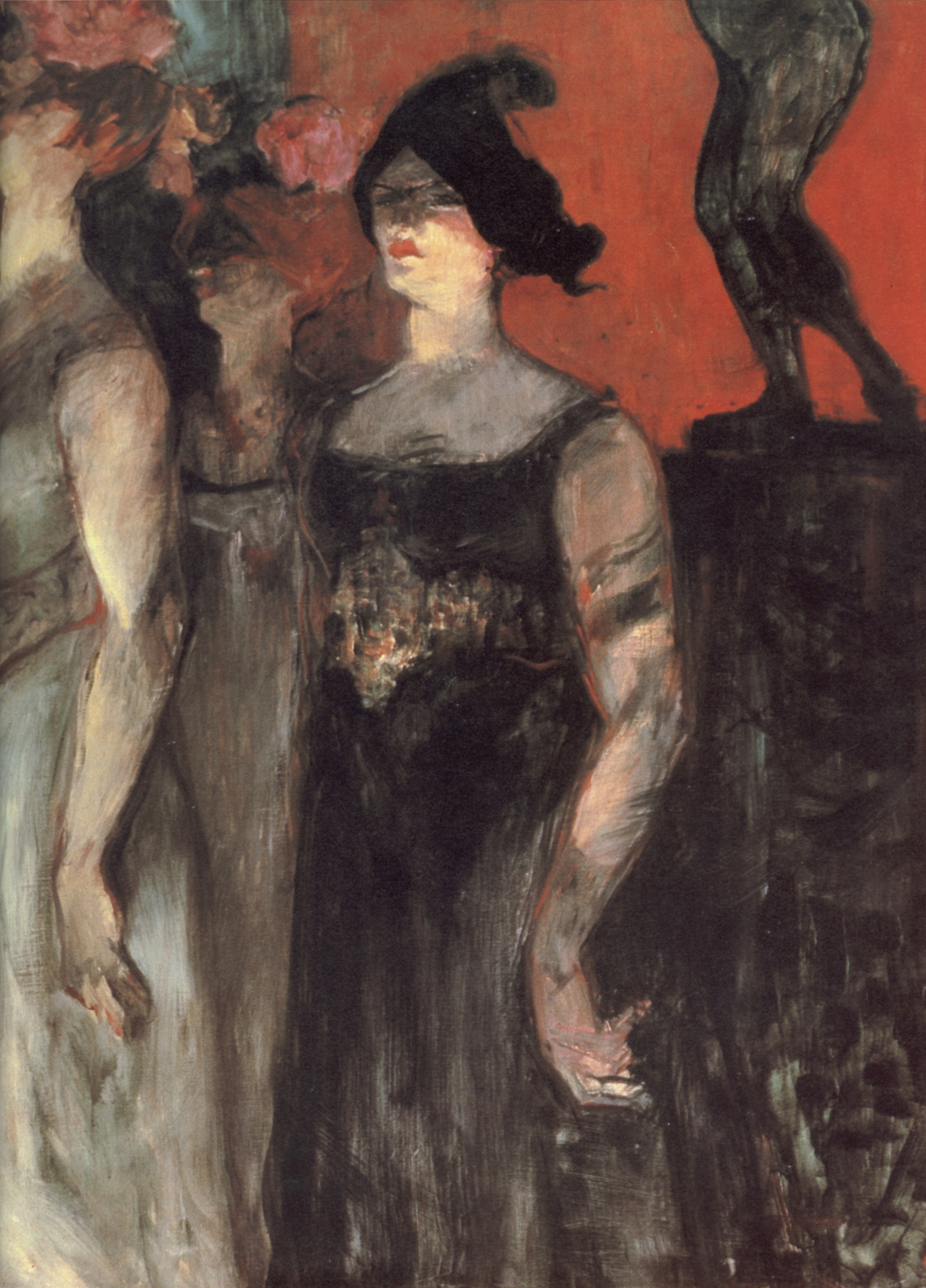
Henri de Toulouse-Lautrec, Messaline, 1900–1901

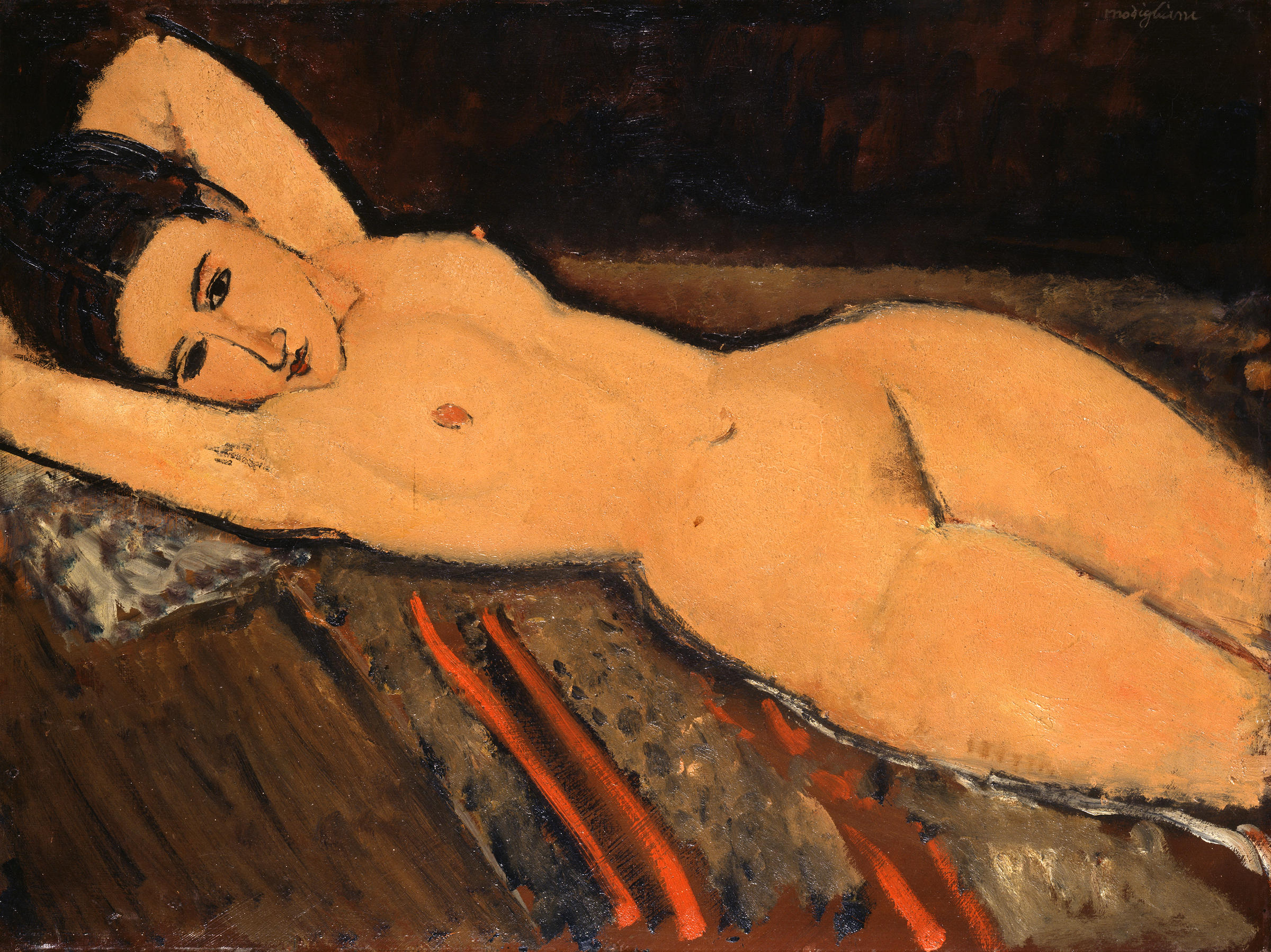
Amedeo Modigliani, Reclining Nude, 1916

== Art theft ==
On 10 February 2008, four paintings worth CHF 180 million ($162.5 million) were stolen from the museum. The four paintings were: Cézanne's Boy in the Red Vest (1894/1895), Degas's Count Lepic and His Daughters (1871), Monet's Poppies near Vétheuil (1879) and Van Gogh's Blossoming Chestnut Branches (1890).

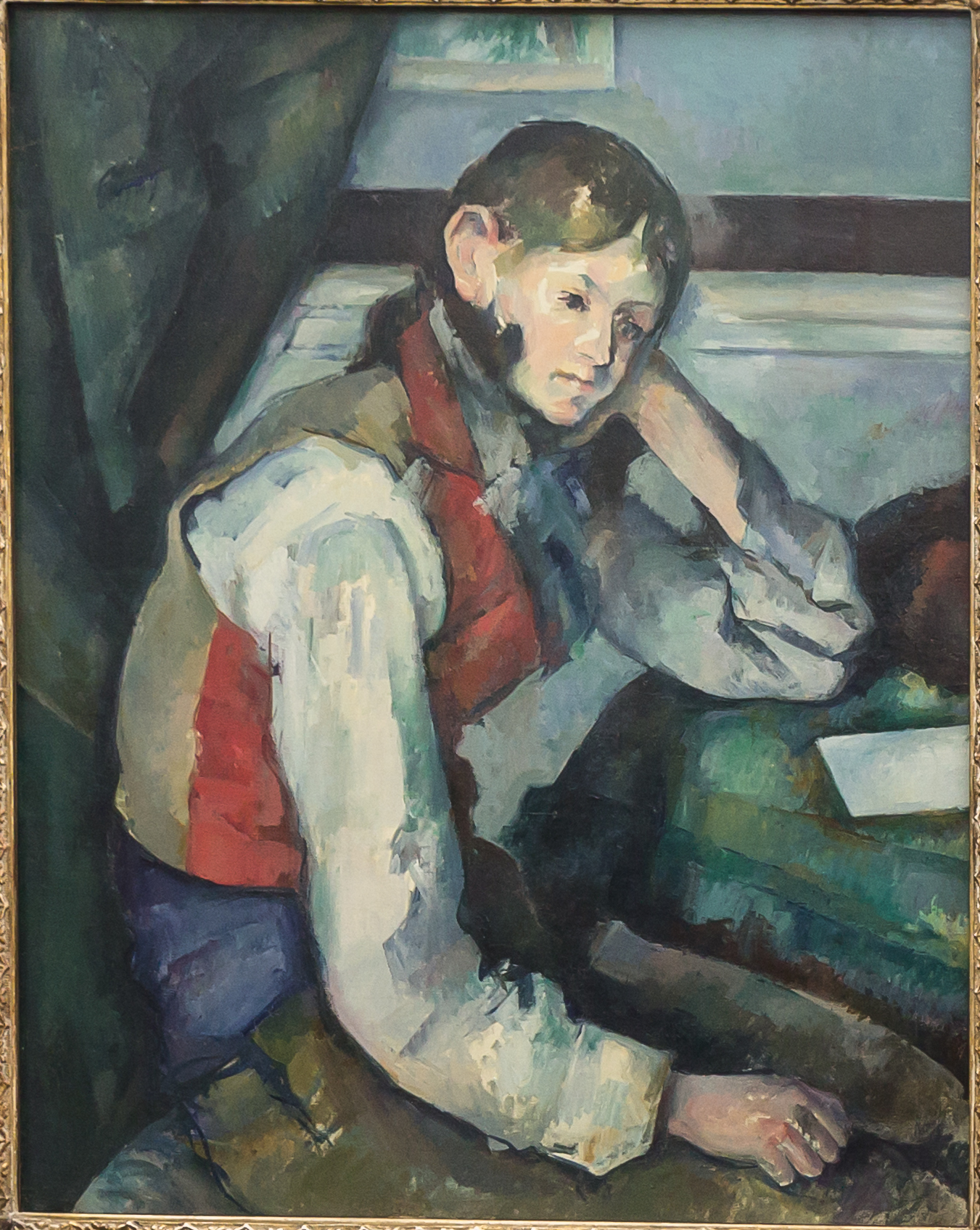
Paul Cézanne, The Boy in the Red Vest, oil on canvas, 1894/1895

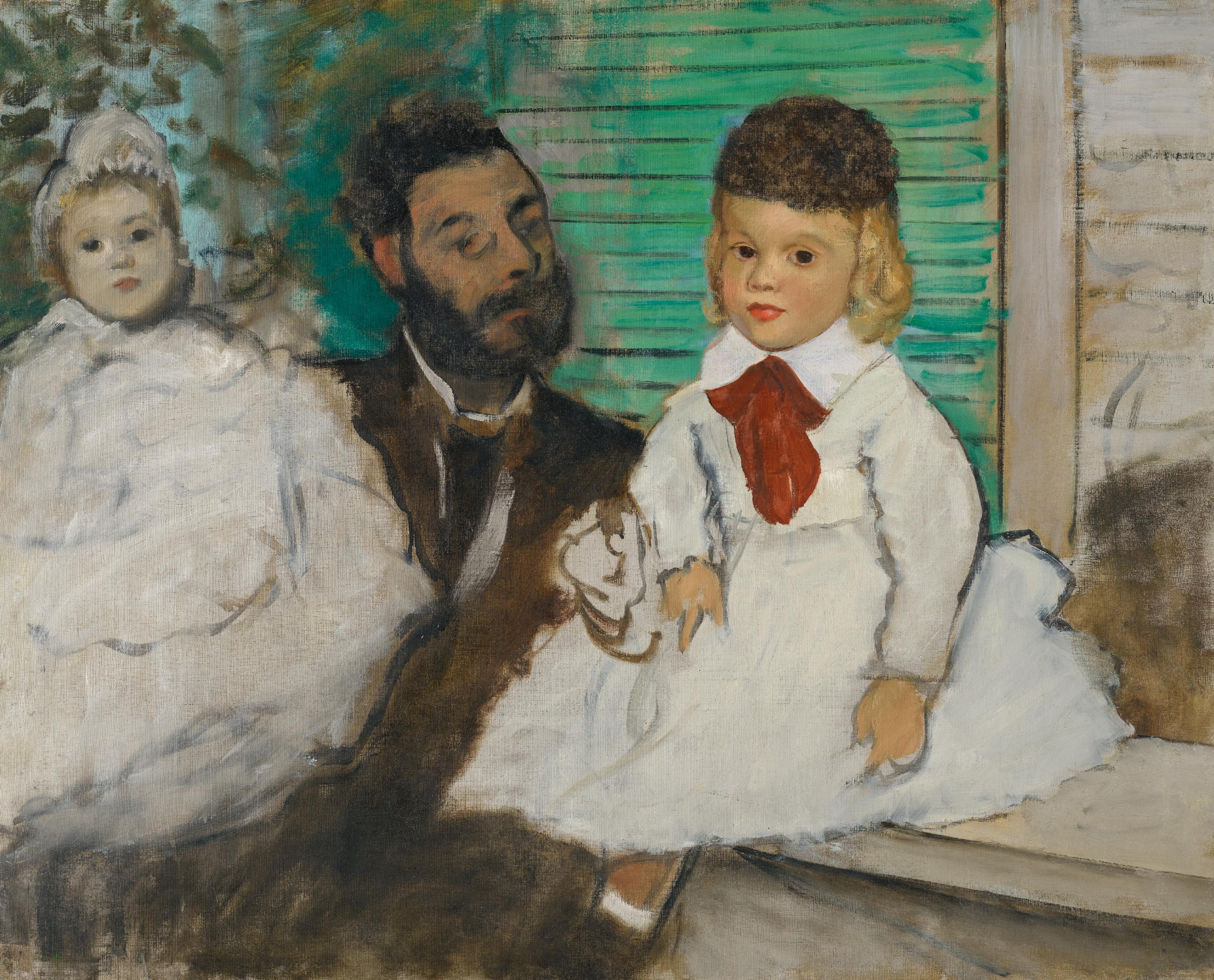
Edgar Degas, Count Lepic and His Daughters, 1871

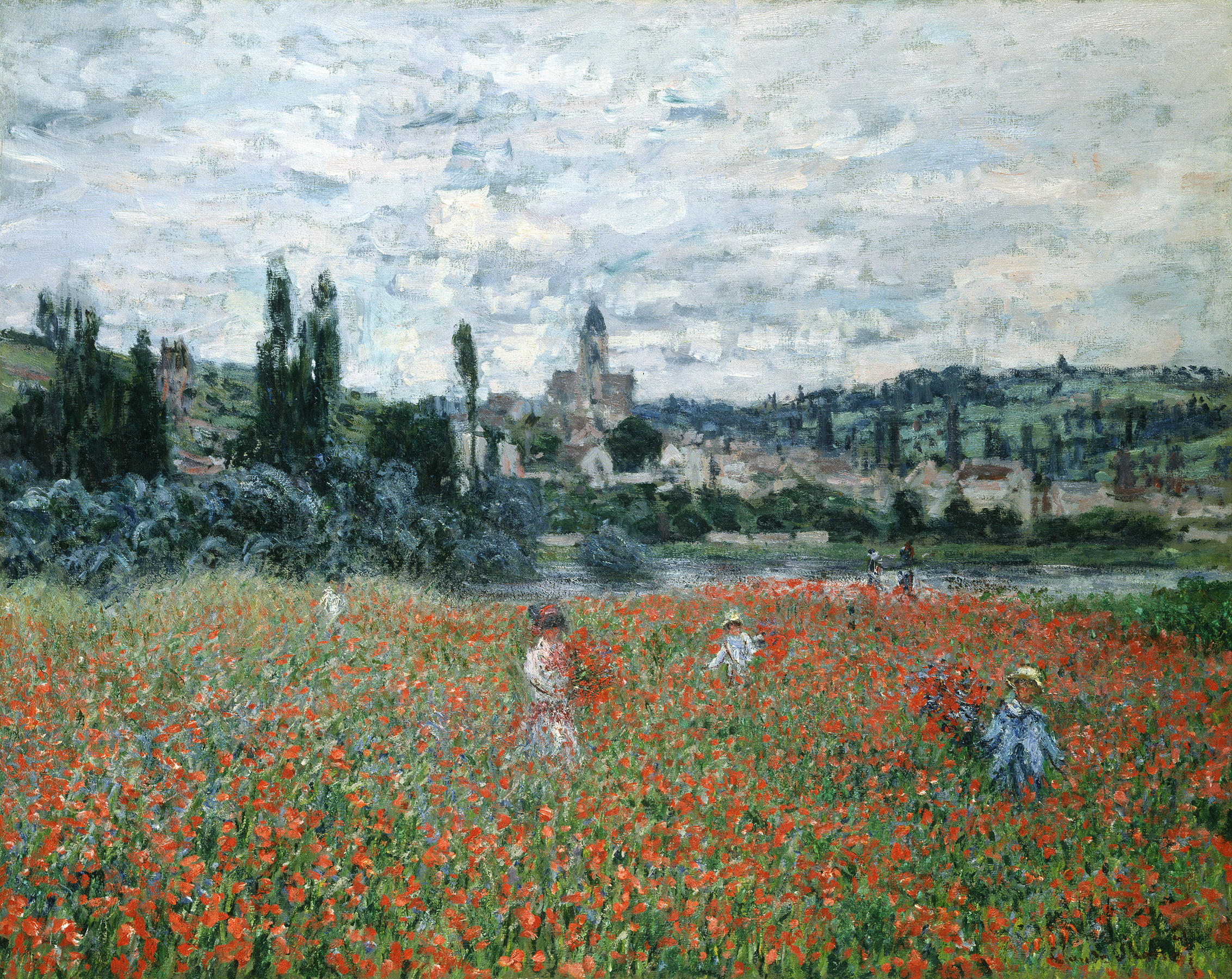
Claude Monet, Poppies near Vétheuil, 1879

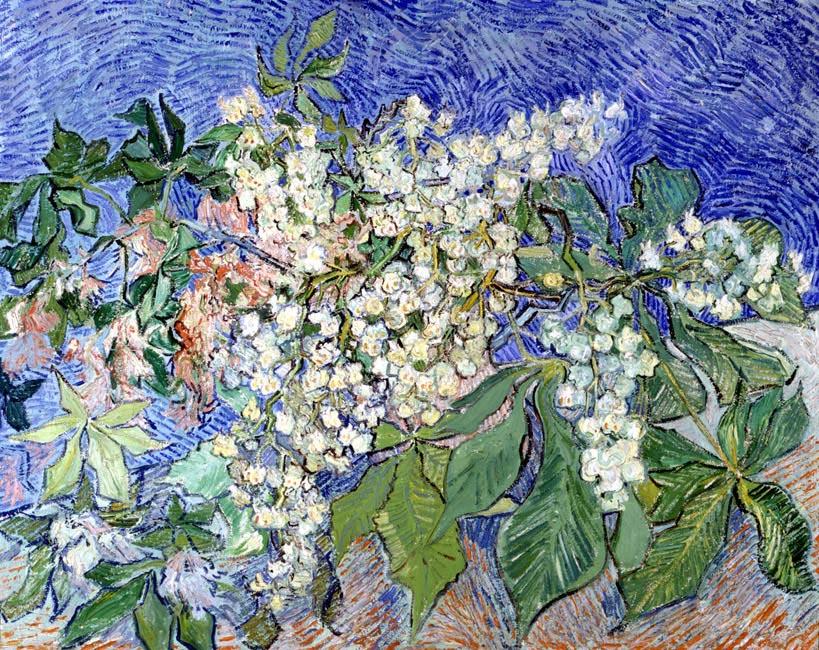
Vincent van Gogh, Blossoming Chestnut Branches, 1890

All four paintings were eventually recovered. Monet's Poppies near Vétheuil and Van Gogh's Blossoming Chestnut Branches were recovered on February 18, 2008 in a car parked in the parking lot of a nearby hospital. Cézanne's Boy in the Red Vest was recovered in Serbia on April 12, 2012. Count Lepic and His Daughters was recovered in April 2012 with slight damage. In 2012, three men were arrested in connection with the theft.

== The "Bührle Black Book" controversy ==
In a 2015 publication entitled The Bührle Black Book, Thomas Buomberger and Guido Magnaguagno called for an investigation into Nazi era provenance gaps in a number of paintings in the Bührle collection. The Foundation had been working with provenance researcher Laurie A Stein since 2002 to update the ownership history of the collection and to publish it online.

== See also ==
- List of museums in Switzerland
