= Julien Leclercq (poet) =

French poet and art collector (1865–1901)

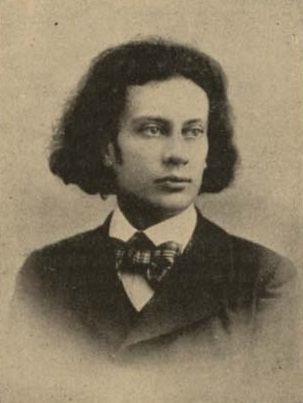
- Julien Leclercq
- Born: 16 May 1865; Armentières
- Died: 31 October 1901 (aged 36); Paris
- Occupations: Poet; Art critic

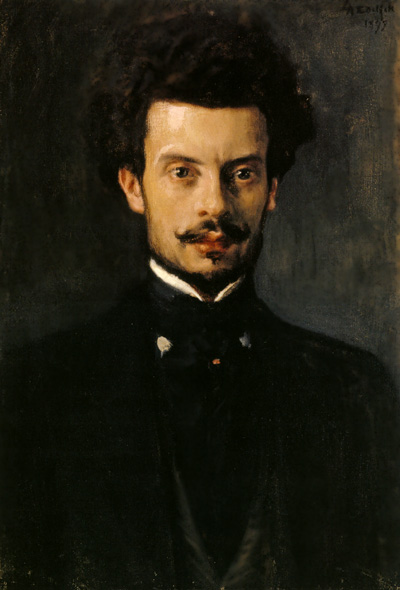
Painting by Albert Edelfelt in 1897

Joseph Louis Julien Leclercq (French pronunciation: [ʒozɛf lwi ʒyljɛ̃ ləklɛʁ]; 16 May 1865 – 31 October 1901) was a 19th-century French poet and art critic, devoted to Symbolism. Like his close friend Albert Aurier, he contributed regularly to the Mercure de France, for example in September 1890 an obituary of Vincent van Gogh. In the 1890s, while engaged to the Finnish pianist Fanny Flodin (1868–1954), Leclercq helped to organize exhibitions of contemporary art, the most important touring in 1898 in Scandinavia. Then, in March 1901, he succeeded in bringing together the first important Van Gogh exhibition exclusively based on loans from French collectors or art dealers, in Paris. It was at this retrospective exhibition — hosted by the Bernheim-Jeune Galleries — that Paul Cassirer was introduced to the work of Van Gogh.

While preparing a similar Van Gogh exhibition, now with the support of Johanna van Gogh-Bonger, Leclercq unexpectedly died on 31 October 1901.

== Selected works ==
- 1891: Strophes d'amant
- 1892: Dialogue platonicien sur l'antisémitisme Morès et Drumont jugés par Socrate. Morès à l'Hippodrome.
- 1892: Les Sept sages et la jeunesse contemporaine
- 1896: La Physionomie, visages et caractères, quatre-vingt-cinq portraits contemporains d'après les principes d'Eugène Ledos.

== Bibliography ==
- Saltzman, Cynthia: Portrait of Dr. Gachet, page 9. ISBN 0-14-025487-0.
- Supinen, Marja: Julien Leclercq, a Champion of the Unknown Vincent van Gogh. Jong Holland 1990/6, p. 5-14. ISSN 0168-9193
