= Blossoming Chestnut Branches =

1890 oil painting by Vincent van Gogh

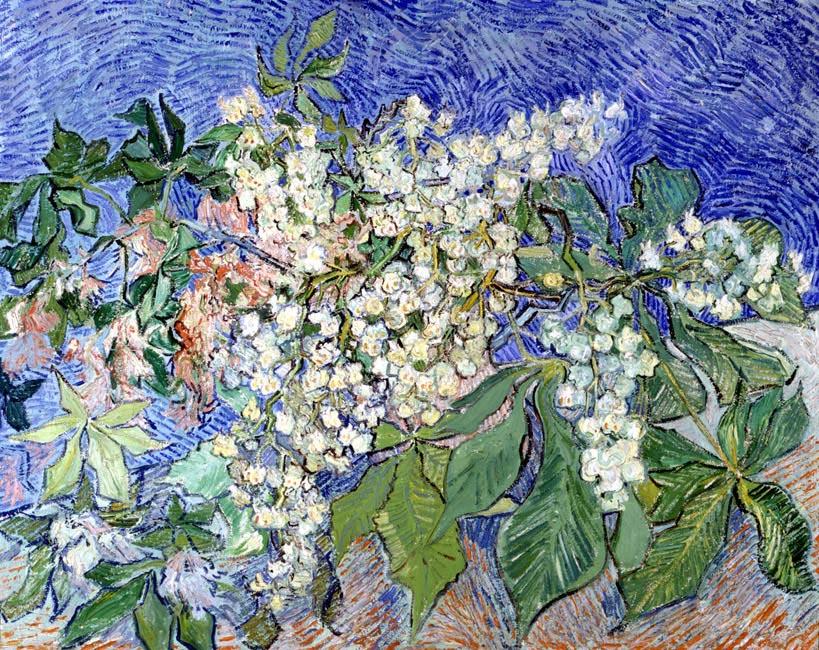
- Artist: Vincent van Gogh
- Year: 1890
- Catalogue: F820; JH2020
- Medium: Oil on canvas
- Dimensions: 72 cm × 91 cm (28 in × 36 in)
- Location: Foundation E.G. Bührle Collection, Zurich

Blossoming Chestnut Branches was painted by Vincent van Gogh during the artist's Auvers-sur-Oise period in May 1890, the final year of his life.

The painting was one of four missing after a high-profile theft from the Foundation E.G. Bührle gallery in Zürich on February 10, 2008. The work was found nine days later in a parked automobile in Zürich, along with one of the other stolen paintings, and was returned undamaged to the gallery.

== See also ==
- List of works by Vincent van Gogh
