= Piano Quintet (Vierne) =

Piano composition by Louis Vierne

Piano and String Quintet
- by Louis Vierne
- Opus: 42
- Composed: 1917–1918:
- Dedication: Jacques Vierne
- Movements: Three

The Piano Quintet, Op. 42, is Louis Vierne's three-movement work for piano and string quartet.

Composed between December 1917 and May 1918, the piece is dedicated "en ex-voto" to the memory of his son Jacques, "who died for France at seventeen" on November 11, 1917. It was first performed privately in Thonon-les-Bains, with the composer at the piano, in June 1919. The public premiere occurred at the Geneva Conservatory on April 23, 1920, followed by its Paris debut at the Salle Gaveau on June 16, 1921.

Conceived during the most tragic period of Vierne's life—nearly blind since childhood, he spent time at a sanatorium in Lausanne undergoing a series of surgical operations (glaucoma and later cataract) from January 1916 to August 1918. Isolated in darkness, he learned of the deaths of his son and his brother René, both victims of the war, and experienced suicidal thoughts. Despite this, Vierne's quintet was immediately successful with audiences. Published in 1924 by Sénart Editions, it gained renewed recognition from the 1980s onward, thanks to concert performances and numerous recordings.

== Introduction ==
=== Background ===
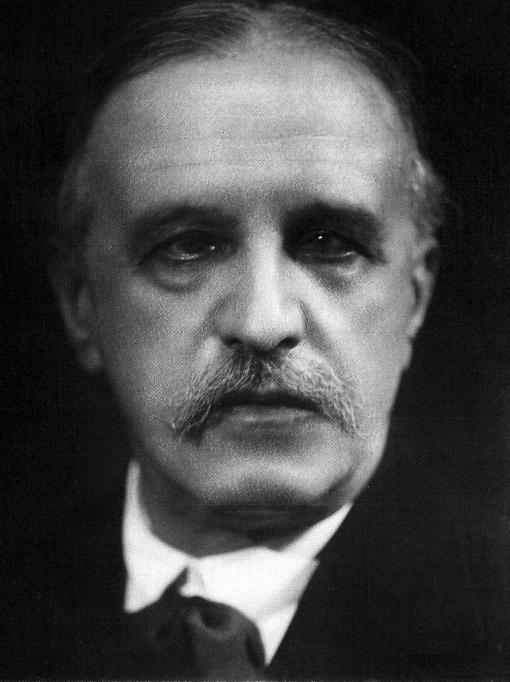
Louis Vierne in 1915 – this rare frontal photograph shows signs of cataract in the right eye and convergent strabismus in the left.

Harry Halbreich succinctly summarizes the context of the quintet's composition: “The years 1916 to 1918, spent in Lausanne, were the most terrible of Vierne’s life. His eyes caused him excruciating pain, his son and brother died in the war, and he came to the brink of suicide."

In notes prepared for his memoirs, Louis Vierne reflects on his near-blindness:

"I came into the world almost blind, and my parents experienced deep sorrow over it. As a result, I was surrounded by warmth and constant affection, which very early on predisposed me to extreme sensitivity. It would follow me throughout my life and become the source of intense joys and inexpressible sufferings." His first biographer, Bernard Gavoty, observes: “In a few simple sentences, we see the outline of a destiny excessively sensitive: the future was to give these predispositions ample opportunity to blossom.”

Born during the Franco-Prussian War of 1870 to a fervently Bonapartist father, Vierne was an ardent patriot. (Note: Gavoty 1980, p. 118) At the outbreak of World War I in 1914, he was 43 (Note: Gavoty 1980, p. 117) and had been the organist at Notre Dame de Paris for 14 years. For him, "the national cataclysm reverberated terribly. But for a musician who made his living through teaching and performing, and who was nearly blind—rendering him unfit for any other profession—the war became a personal catastrophe. Within weeks, students disappeared, either mobilized or fleeing Paris with their families. Besides, who thought of music during that summer of 1914, on the threshold of the most tragic ordeal France had faced since the Revolution of 1789?" (Note: Gavoty 1980, pp. 118–119)

His two brothers, René (also an organist, born in 1878) and Édouard (born in 1872), went to the front. (Note: Gavoty 1980, p. 119) Vierne, deeply affected by the separation from his family, especially his children, wrote to a friend:

I can no longer work. At every moment, my thoughts leave the sketch on my table and go to my little ones, who are far from me. Sometimes I feel a kind of conflict between my love for them and my love for music: could our spiritual children be jealous of those born of flesh? (Note: Gavoty 1980, p. 116)

In 1915, the composer began to suffer the "first symptoms of glaucoma, which was completing his blindness." In a letter to his student and friend Nadia Boulanger dated August 19, he wrote: "My severely shaken nervous system has suddenly collapsed. At the moment, I am battling a crisis of optic neuritis." This was also the year when his companion of six years, soprano Jeanne Montjovet, left him, compounding his distress. (Note: Gavoty 1980, p. 120) In December, during a concert tour in Switzerland, he consulted Professor Samuel Eperon, who advised him to attempt surgery.

Thus, starting from his return on July 12, 1916, there were two years of treatments and care during which "the ophthalmologist was often close to despair: the right eye was still intact, but could the left eye be saved? Surgery was impossible due to a prior intervention; it was therefore essential to preserve this eye through purely medical means and above all to prevent the infection from spreading to the right eye." (Note: Gavoty 1980, pp. 123–124) However, complications and crises followed one another, and on September 30, 1918, a secondary cataract, which had formed again on the right eye, required a new operation, performed on October 9 "not without difficulty." (Note: Gavoty 1980, p. 124) Hardly had the patient recovered when an extremely painful iridocyclitis forced him to remain in total darkness for six months—a harrowing ordeal but ultimately successful: "Vierne narrowly escaped total blindness."

In the midst of his convalescence, as though "misfortune were standing guard", the musician contracted chronic bronchitis with complications of double pneumonia, from which he barely survived. In his journal, he simply noted: "That would have been too perfect..."

=== Dedication ===
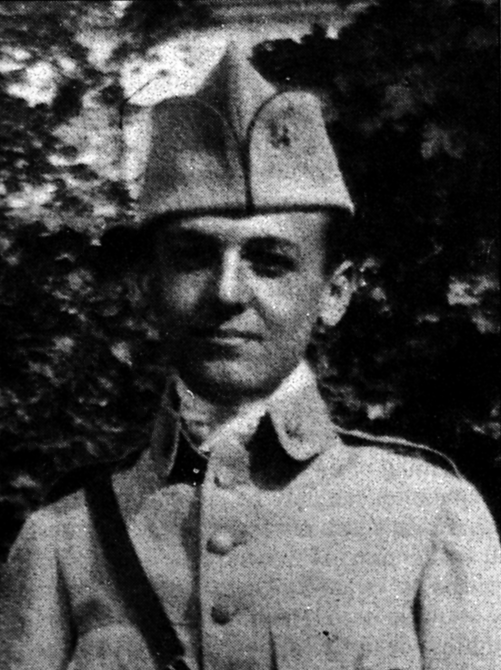
Jacques Vierne in 1917, as he left for the Aisne front on May 10.

Vierne’s Piano Quintet is dedicated to his son Jacques, born March 6, 1900, and "killed for France at the age of seventeen on November 11, 1917." This date was particularly cruel, being exactly one year before the armistice. The composer bore a heavy burden of guilt for allowing his son to enlist. In 1913, Vierne had already lost his son André, who died at the age of ten.

Of his three children, Jacques was the only one who shared his life at the time, although he remained "distant from him in spirit: not very musical, charming but without a spiritual connection to his father, he was not for Vierne the support and solace he had so desperately hoped for." At the time of his divorce, finalized on August 4, 1909, (Note: Gavoty 1980, p. 103) the composer had obtained custody of this son, who displayed "a strong-willed and determined character." As soon as he reached the age of eligibility, Jacques resolved to enlist. Uncertain and anxious, Louis Vierne took the necessary steps with the French consulate in Lausanne, and "on May 10, Jacques left." (Note: Gavoty 1980, p. 130) After "a rather brief period of training, having diligently completed his military preparation over a year", Jacques was killed "during an attack on November 11, 1917." Bernard Gavoty described the composer as cruelly "tormented by scruples."

The reality is even more cruel: according to a record compiled by the Prefecture of the Seine, Jacques Vierne allegedly took his own life on November 12, 1917. It is also possible that he was executed as an example, as acknowledged in 2014 by Jean-Claude Crespy, cultural attaché at the French Embassy in Austria. Denis Herlin considers it "almost certain that he was executed following his refusal to fight." Jean Gallois suggests a complete change in the young man's attitude: having volunteered for service, he became, in the face of the horrors experienced on the front, a conscientious objector. In his 2011 biography of the composer, Franck Besingrand preferred not to revisit the exact circumstances of Jacques’ death, "which had always been believed to have occurred in combat." (Note: Rollin Smith also writes, in 1999: "On November 11, 1917, Louis Vierne's eldest son was killed during a battle at the front.") However, "what was once seen as dishonor or disgrace has faded in light of new historical insights and the restoration of certain truths", thanks to the rehabilitation efforts for executed soldiers since the late 1990s.

In response to this tragedy, "amid the sterility of despair, an idea suddenly germinated in Vierne's mind—a poet's idea: for this son, he had poorly understood, perhaps insufficiently loved, he would create something beautiful. He would produce a cry of pain and love, in which he would express to his son's soul all the things he had wished to say but that circumstances had prevented." (Note: Gavoty 1980, p. 131)

On February 10, 1918, he wrote to his friend Maurice Blazy:

To describe my state of mind now is unnecessary, isn't it? Life holds no material meaning for me anymore. Without purpose and interest, it would be a mockery if I did not resolve to react differently and devote the rest of my life to an entirely ideal task. I have forever said farewell to any ambition for fleeting glory and renounced that vain external agitation called the struggle for life. I will dedicate myself solely to creation.
I am building, as an ex-voto, a Quintet of vast proportions, imbued with the breath of my tenderness and the tragic destiny of my child. I will complete this work with an energy as fierce and furious as my pain is terrible. I will create something powerful, grandiose, and strong, stirring the deepest fibers of a father's love for his dead son. As the last of my name, I will bury it in a roar of thunder—not in a plaintive bleating of a resigned, blissful sheep. (Note: Gavoty 1980, pp. 131–132)

These lines, according to Bernard Gavoty, "better than any analysis, explain the genesis of a masterpiece."

=== Composition ===
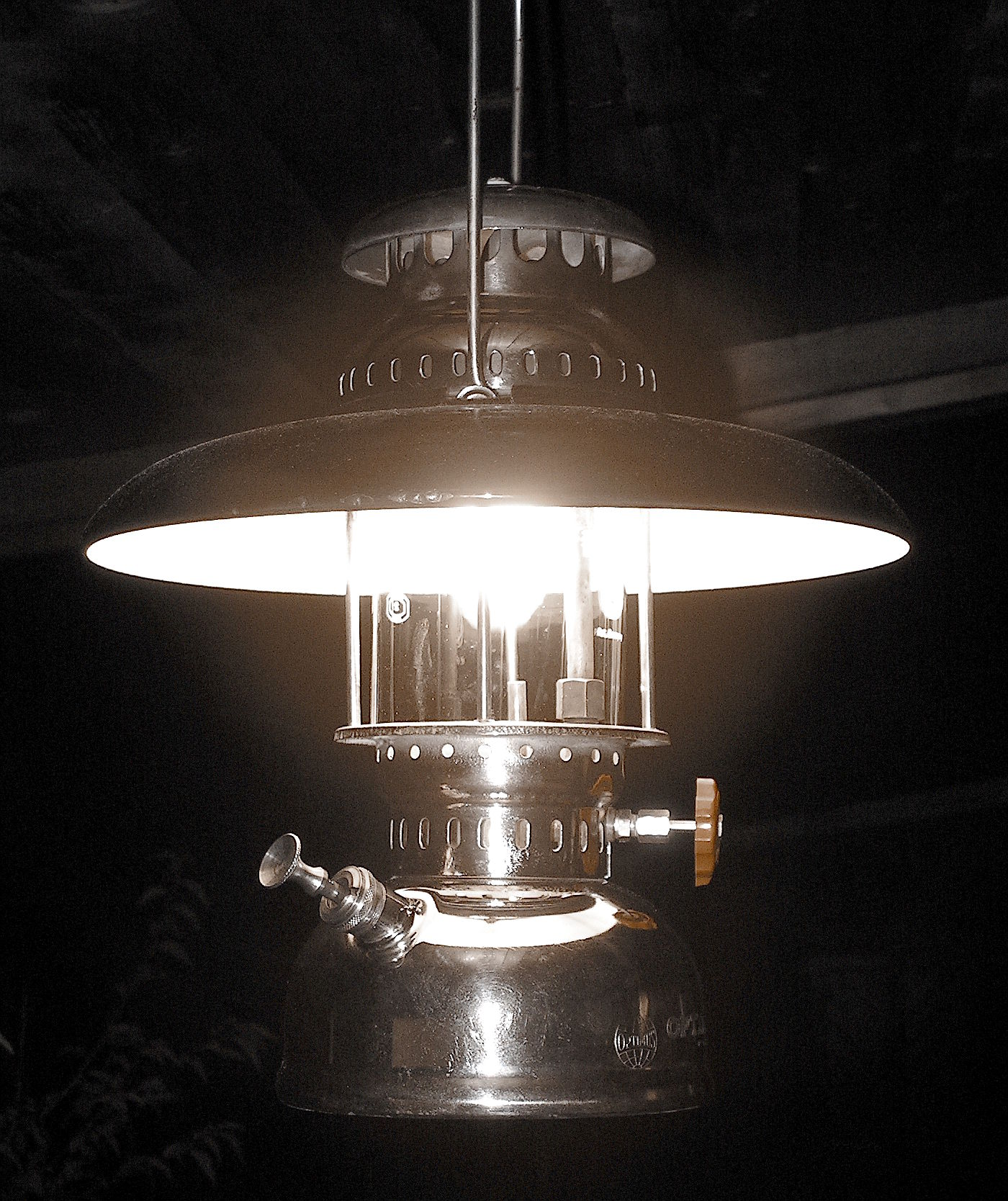
Because of his handicap, Louis Vierne was always reduced to composing under the fire of a powerful Auer mouthpiece.

Although the news of his son's death "utterly destroyed him", Louis Vierne overcame his grief by channeling it into a sentiment of indignation or revolt, familiar to him. Bernard Gavoty highlights how "anger was for him a supreme stimulant. It made his creative mind boil over with a world of vengeful images, which resolved into vigorous themes—raging like a storm or sharp as a whip. He would throw it all onto paper immediately, like molten lava. Then, as he worked to refine it, his rage would give way to a more tempered sentiment. The artist would immerse himself in his work, giving the initial draft unexpected dimensions and extensions. He worked in serenity after giving birth in agony. The miracle was accomplished." (Note: Gavoty 1980, p. 111)

Driven by this "stab of pain, everything that had been swirling incoherently within him crystallized. The music surged like a tide. Themes flowed forth, drawn by the helpless grief seeking an outlet. Already, Vierne could hear the desolate lament of the strings. Feverishly, he wrote down everything that came to him, torn between his grief as a father and the creator's anxiety, which irresistibly sought to take its place." At the time, his eyes still caused him excruciating pain. When the throbbing made rest impossible, he spent the night at the piano, improvising, composing, and surrendering to the inspiration that dictated sublime accents to him. This process culminated in the Quintet, Op. 42, completed in just six months, from December 1917 to May 1918, at the Villa Rochemont (Note: Gavoty 1980, p. 122) in Chailly near Lausanne.

The composition of such a demanding work occurred under challenging conditions. "How he managed it physically is a mystery. Up to that point, he worked with his nose pressed against the sheet, drawing large note figures on greatly magnified staves, assisted by his beloved younger brother, René, an accomplished organist himself." While his weakened but still functional vision allowed him to write his compositions by hand, tasks like copying or orchestrating, which would have excessively fatigued him, were delegated. Yet, always by the light of a gas mantle—so close and intense that he confessed to a friend, "The staves eventually turned bloody."

In these circumstances, the letters Louis Vierne received every fortnight were his last source of comfort. While his brother Édouard, described as "mysterious, less forthcoming, writing little, and retaining from childhood a habit of withdrawal", (Note: Gavoty 1980, p. 126) offered less frequent correspondence, René sent affectionate and encouraging letters. Also, a pianist, René provided news of composer friends, such as "André Caplet, an admirable liaison sergeant in active service. What a great guy!" He also reported the success of Vierne's works in the unusual context of the front:

I played your Préludes for my comrades at the front... It was beautiful, my old friend, you have no idea how beautiful it was! Your music resonates deeply with us, you know? It speaks directly, without beating around the bush. (Note: Gavoty 1980, p. 134)

René’s final letter, dated April 30, 1918, announced he had just received the Croix de Guerre:

Since my Conservatoire prize, I have never had such good news to share with you. And I feel almost embarrassed to think I have nothing better to offer, while you, each year, enrich our shared heritage with a new masterpiece. Let's say that I have done on your behalf what you couldn't do yourself, fighting for two while you composed for three... and far beyond. (Note: Gavoty 1980, p. 135)

As Vierne was concluding his Quintet, he was confronted with a new and particularly distressing misfortune, one that was even more traumatic than the death of his son: (Note: Gavoty 1980, p. 132) Corporal René Vierne was killed in action on May 29, 1918, on the Branscourt Plateau in the Marne. Initially reported as "missing in action", it soon emerged that "a large-caliber shell had obliterated him." For the convalescing musician, this was the final blow; he never recovered from the loss of his brother. Nineteen years later, on December 31, 1936—just months before his death—he wrote: "I gave you the burial God denied you; your grave is carved in my heart." (Note: Gavoty 1980, p. 136) The immediate musical tribute Vierne composed for his brother was Solitude, Op. 44, (Note: Besingrand 2011, p. 131) a piano poem described as "unyielding", "strange, visionary, and violent."

=== Creation and publication ===
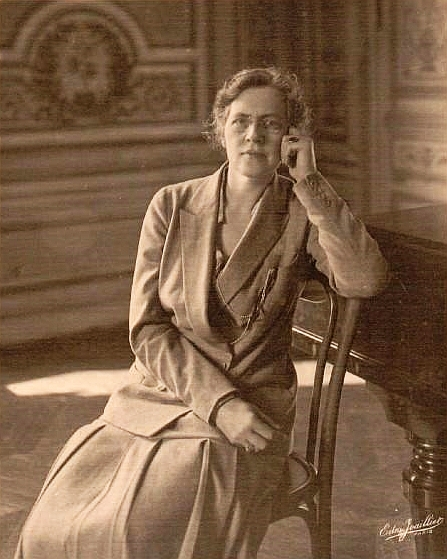
Nadia Boulanger performed the piano part of the Quintet at the 1921 concert in Paris.

First presented in a private audition in Thonon-les-Bains in June 1919, with Vierne himself at the piano, the public premiere of the Quintet for Piano and Strings took place at the Geneva Conservatory on April 23, 1920, to "resounding success." This "sensational debut" was followed by a Parisian premiere on June 16, 1921, (Note: Jean-Pierre Mazeirat gives the date of July 16, 1921, for the Paris premiere, in the booklet for the box set dedicated to Louis Vierne's chamber music for the Timpani label.) at Salle Gaveau during the "Armande de Polignac-Louis Vierne Festival." According to Le Ménestrel, the composers and performers "received great applause."

Despite the era's preference for escapism after the war, audiences recognized the genius of this deeply somber work. "How could anyone remain indifferent to such an expression of genius?"

The Quintet maintained its popularity through the interwar years. On February 12, 1937, Paul Reboux described it in Paris-soir as a "talisman of solace": "This work embodies an emotion, power, and sensitivity that are impossible to ignore."

Remaining true to his artistic principles, Vierne insisted on an expressive interpretation of his compositions: "Oh! The piano machine, the violin machine, the singing machine (the most fearsome of all), and other noise industrialists... Let them return to their factories!" (Note: Gavoty 1980, p. 196)

The composer was "a born teacher", (Note: Gavoty 1980, p. 194) and "Vierne's kindness toward his students remained legendary. His leniency, however, never turned into weakness. He never compromised: he demanded a great deal from his students", (Note: Gavoty 1980, p. 193) whether at the organ or the piano. To introduce his work to the Parisian public, it is unsurprising that he entrusted the piano part to Nadia Boulanger, "one of his favorite pupils", who consistently acknowledged, throughout her long and illustrious career as an organist, virtuoso pianist, and music teacher, what she owed to "her first master." (Note: Gavoty 1980, p. 195)

The 1920s were a "favorable era, if not for composers, at least for virtuosos." (Note: Gavoty 1980, p. 144) Vierne's new partner, Madeleine Richepin, "approached publishers and worked to have the pieces composed between 1914 and 1920 engraved." The Quintet was published in 1924 by Éditions Sénart. (Note: Gavoty 1980, p. 308) The composer's financial situation also stabilized thanks to a contract signed that same year with the publisher Henry Lemoine, ensuring the publication of his new works. (Note: Gavoty 1980, p. 163)

There is no autograph manuscript of the score. Based on the copyist's manuscript used for the first performance of the Quintet for Piano and Strings, Op. 42—which includes some indications leading to textual modifications—a revised version of the score was reissued in 1993.

== Overview of the work ==
=== Movements ===
The Quintet consists of three movements (Note: Metronome markings were generally altered during engraving by the Sénart Editions in 1924. They were corrected in the 1993 Salabert edition, based on the manuscript copy of the score.) of very classical construction:

1. Poco lento – Moderato (222 measures, 4/4 time)
2. Larghetto sostenuto (180 measures, alternating 6/4 and 3/2 time)
3. Maestoso – Allegro molto risoluto (432 measures, alternating time signatures)

According to Benoît Duteurtre, the work possesses "a rare emotional intensity, [its] impact magnified by the splendor of the instrumental writing and the perfectly balanced structure."

The performance duration does not exceed 31 minutes. While the movements of Vierne's Quintet, Op. 42, are sometimes described as "immense", they align more with a "monumental conception." Its execution is notably shorter than its model, Franck’s Quintet, which lasts 39 minutes.

Vierne's Quintet is also significantly shorter than other French piano quintets of the same period. For example:

- Gabriel Pierné’s Quintet, Op. 41 (1916–1917), exceeds 35 minutes.
- Charles Koechlin’s Quintet, Op. 80 (1920–1921), reaches 37 minutes.
- Florent Schmitt’s Quintet, Op. 51, completed in 1919 but begun in 1905, spans nearly 55 minutes, unfolding "in a kind of Dionysian rapture."

=== Tonalities ===
While centered in C minor, the Quintet features numerous modulations and a central movement in E minor. (Note: Benoît Duteurtre presents the Quintet for two violins, viola, cello, and piano as a work in G major.) Some passages verge on atonality, with chromaticism so sharp it occasionally breaks traditional tonal language. In the Poco lento, for instance, the tortured and shadowy opening theme defies any clear tonal anchor, placing Vierne closer to Schoenberg than to Franck.

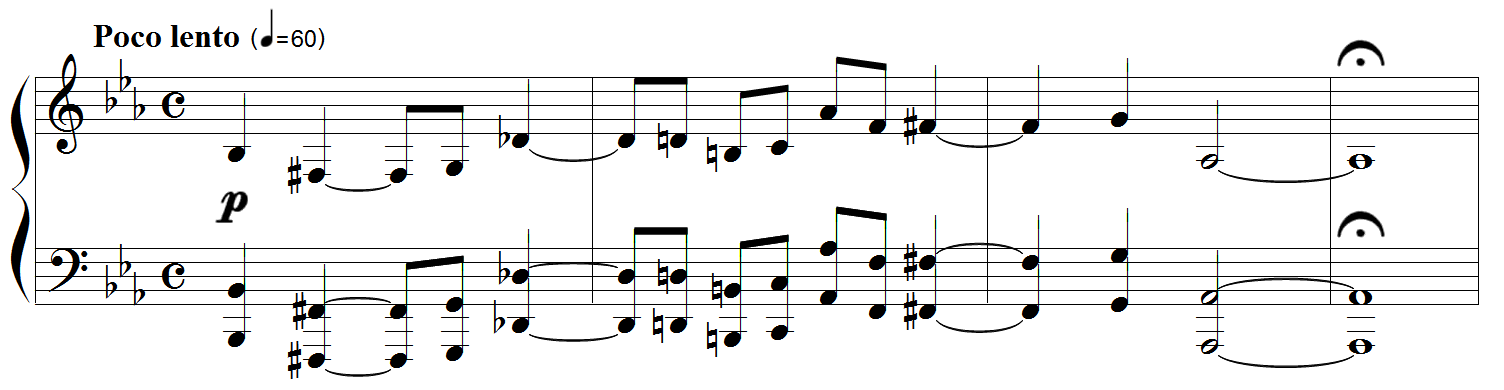
Louis Vierne – Quintette, op. 42 (1st movement, first bars) Listen to Quintet op. 42,1st movement (mes. 1-4):

It would be exaggerated to associate this theme—"almost serial in nature!" as Harry Halbreich marvels, at least "close to the series, with its deliberately obscure tonality and somberly impenetrable mood"—with true twelve-tone technique, which only appears in Schönberg's work "timidly in 1923 and firmly by 1925." In this nine-note sequence—and even ten at the beginning of the final movement—Vierne diminishes the importance of the tonic (C, marked as the 1st degree) and the dominant (G, corresponding to the 8th degree) by placing these notes on weak beats. He employs repeated chromatic formulas—a progression highlighted in red, consisting of an ascending minor second followed by a descending major seventh—and excludes only the 4th and 5th degrees (the minor and major thirds) from the chromatic scale:

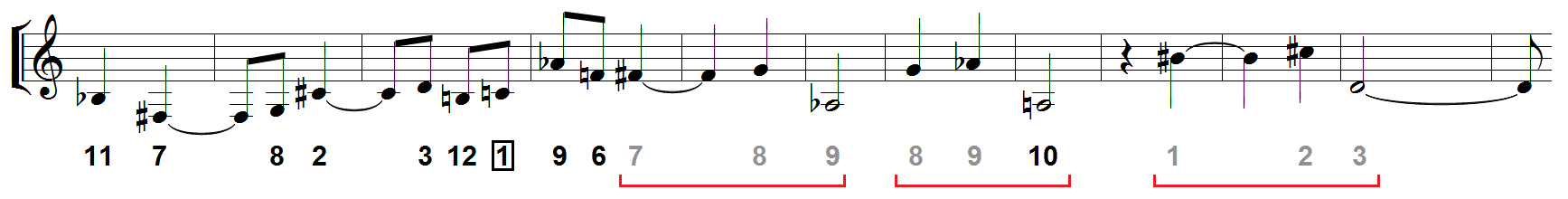
Louis Vierne – Quintet op. 42, 3rd movement (meas.40–51): Theme and analysis.

When listening, the feeling takes precedence over analysis, and these opening measures "clearly reflect a mourning process. Thus, one immediately senses the infinite sorrow caused by the loss of this cherished being who died so young." The musical discourse develops through this "series of incoherent sounds, which can be linked to remorse for having allowed him to go to war or incomprehension in the face of such fate."

Rather than Schönberg, Franz Liszt—particularly as expressed in his late, visionary works such as La Lugubre Gondole and Bagatelle sans tonalité—serves as the model here, along with Richard Wagner. Vierne, like Schönberg, admired Tristan und Isolde for its "assertive chromaticism." (Note: Gavoty 1980, p. 233) The subsequent measures of the Quintet, where the piano explores every degree of the scale, nearly rest on the "Tristan chord:"

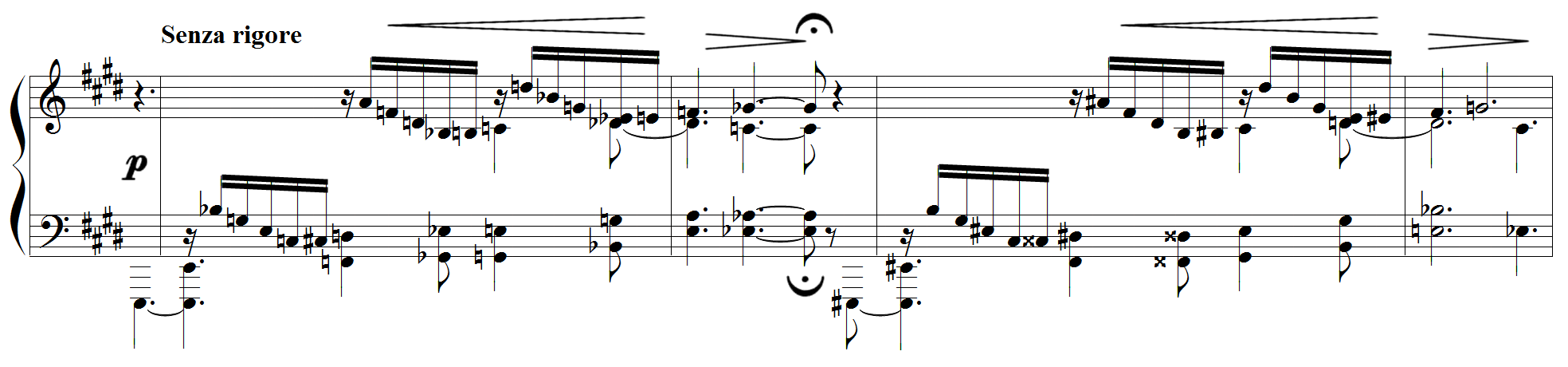
Louis Vierne – Quintette, op. 42 (2nd movement, bars 140–143) Listen to Quintet op. 42, 2nd movement (mes. 140-143):

== Analysis ==
=== Technical ===
Louis Vierne’s reputation as a performer and composer is closely associated with the organ, where he stands as a leading figure in French musical life of the early 20th century, alongside Widor and Tournemire. (Note: Besingrand 2011, p. 140) However, even in the 19th century, few French organists were capable of writing for the piano, apart from Boëly, Alkan, César Franck, and Camille Saint-Saëns—all remarkable pianists. At the dawn of the 20th century, Vierne appears as their successor. Though he "humbly admitted that the piano was not his instrument", his virtuosity, sense of phrasing, subtle touch, and mastery of tonal nuances would have allowed him to enjoy a brilliant career as a pianist.

This explains why the composer participated in the private and public premieres of his Quintet for Piano and Strings. A talented accompanist who "loved accompanying", he "knew everything about the piano, its strengths as well as its limitations." According to critic Jean-Pierre Mazeirat, "Although Vierne contributes nothing fundamentally new to piano technique, let us not be mistaken: Vierne's piano is magnificent piano." Moreover, "the piano is always used masterfully, often in a very virtuosic manner, as in the Allegro molto risoluto, with its broad, accentuated chords, cascading octaves, and dizzying runs." (Note: Besingrand 2011, p. 129)

Vierne's perfect knowledge of violin technique might come as a surprise, but it stems from the education he received as a child at the National Institute for Blind Youth. Its curriculum, established by Valentin Haüy at the end of the 18th century, included "not only piano but also a mandatory orchestral instrument." As a result, Vierne studied "piano and violin simultaneously."

Finally, Vierne's writing for the piano quintet formation seems, in Franck Besingrand's words, to "push instrumental limits to the extreme." (Note: Besingrand 2011, p. 127) Similarly, Benoît Duteurtre believes that "through the density of his harmony, Vierne makes the quintet sound like a sumptuous orchestra, always dominated by those sweeping, passionate melodic surges that are the composer's hallmark." "It seems impossible to extract more music from these five instruments, which sound like an entire orchestra."

=== Influences ===
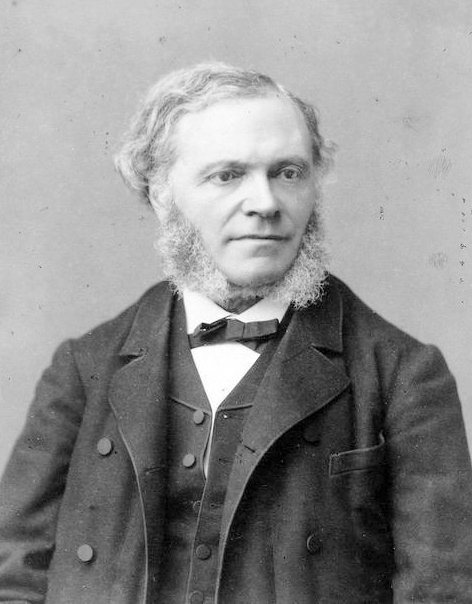
César Franck
(1822-1890)

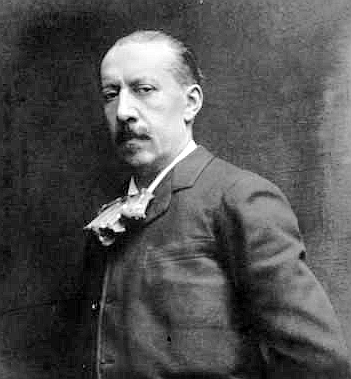
Charles-Marie Widor
(1844-1937)

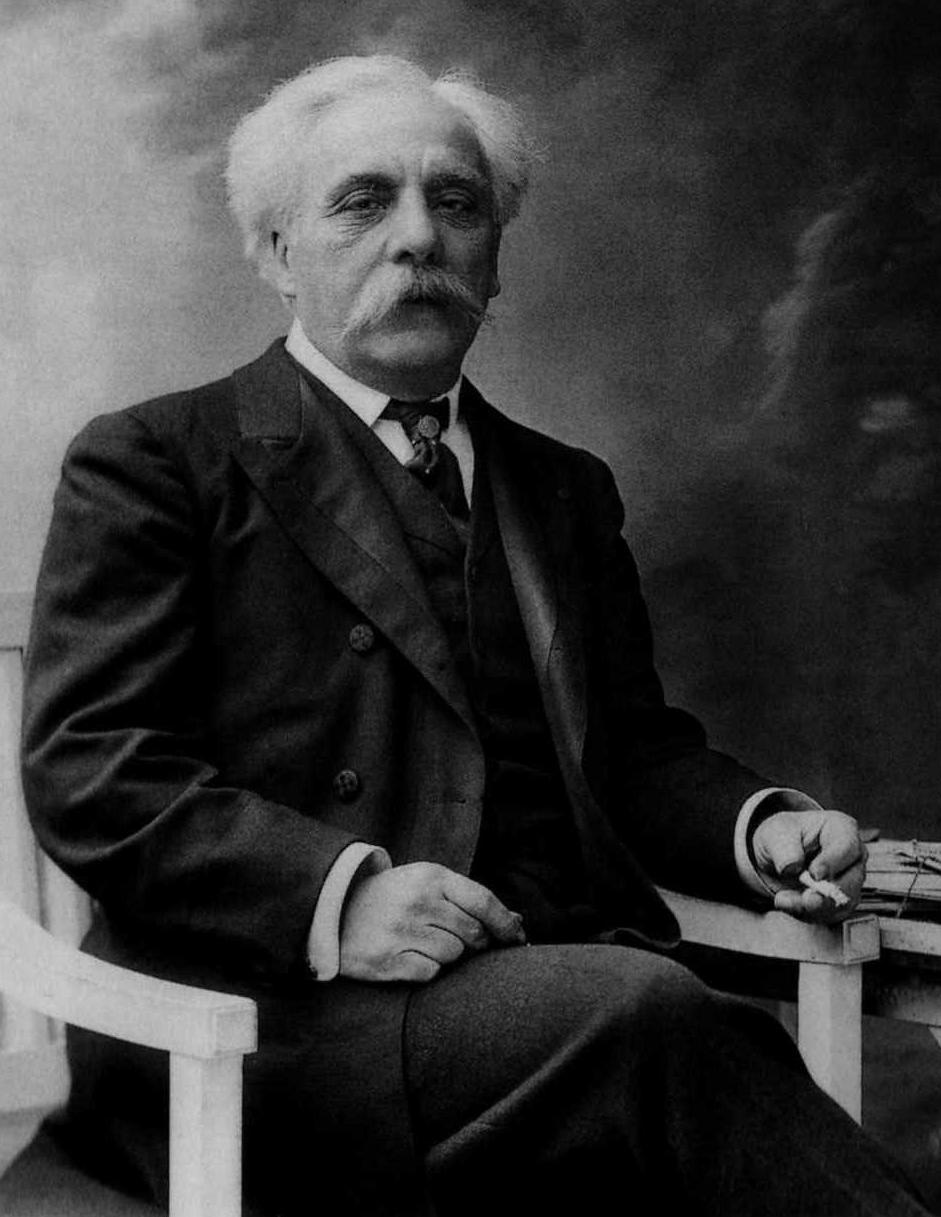
Gabriel Fauré
(1845-1924)

Vierne’s Quintet for Piano and Strings belongs to a repertoire enriched by composers he greatly admired. Franck composed his famous Quintet in 1879, Widor his second quintet (Op. 68) in 1896, and Fauré his first quintet (Op. 89) in 1906 (his second, Op. 115, was composed after Vierne's, between 1919 and 1921).

In 1886, during his first public competition, Louis Vierne won first prizes in piano and violin, in front of a jury chaired by César Franck. Along with personal congratulations and encouragement, Franck inspired immense respect in the sixteen-year-old musician. Beginning the following year, Vierne attended weekly private lessons at Franck's home at 6 am. This mentorship was interrupted when Vierne entered the Paris Conservatory in October 1890, and Franck died shortly thereafter, on November 10. However, Charles-Marie Widor took over the organ class, demonstrating such high regard for Vierne that he spontaneously offered to complete his training:

I understand the deep connection you had with Franck; I have respected and will continue to respect the artistic mindset that this great musician has instilled in you. Yet, there are practical aspects I can teach you since you are in the organ class but not in the composition class. I will introduce you to chamber music, rarely practiced at the Conservatory, symphonic music (for which you seem born), musical prosody, lyrical declamation, and orchestration. This program will require years: do you feel capable of committing to it and neglecting nothing to become a complete composer?

The young musician's personality quickly flourished under these masters, who "showed him the way. Franck opened the path, and Widor widened it with his discoveries—a 'beautiful alloy,' which Vierne masterfully leveraged in his future works." Another crucial encounter was Gabriel Fauré. According to Bernard Gavoty, "Apart from Franck, the only true passion Vierne had within the modern school was for Gabriel Fauré." (Note: Gavoty 1980, pp. 212–213) For musicologist Harry Halbreich, "if we recognize in Chausson a missing link between Franck and Debussy, it is an intermediate position between Franck and Fauré that the finest works of Vierne reveal." Some passages of the Quintet show how "Fauré’s harmony and style influenced him at times. Vierne balanced himself between Franck and Fauré: less ecstatic than the former, less pure than the latter, more profoundly lyrical than either, and aligned with a more absolute Romanticism tempered neither by prayer nor modesty, but by style alone." (Note: Gavoty 1980, p. 213)

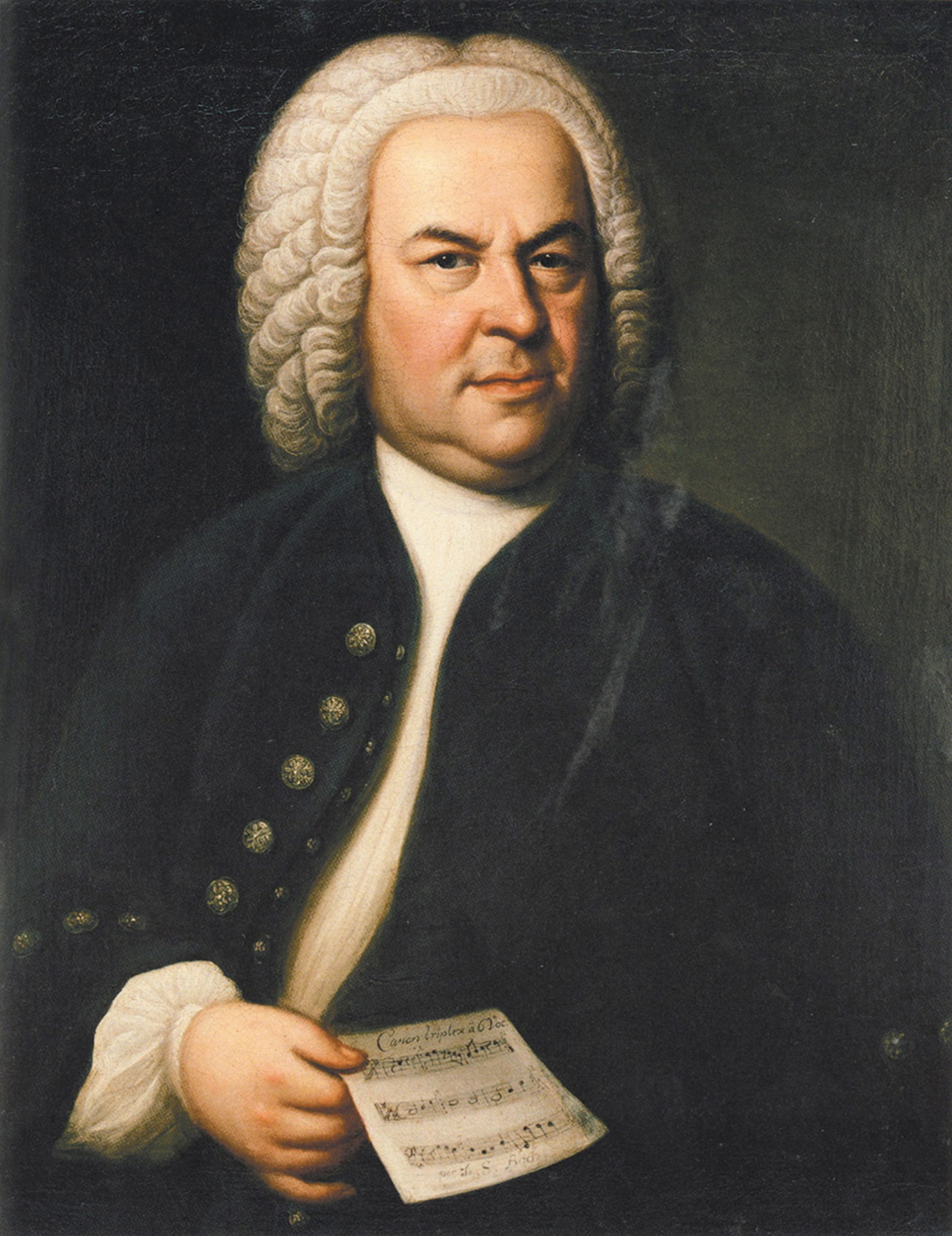
Johann Sebastian Bach, the ‘great among the great’ (Note: Gavoty 1980, p. 198) (G according to Louis Vierne, who added: ‘What an admirable feeling of Catholicity! Yes, I know, he was a Protestant, that's indisputable; only, what does that matter, since it doesn't show?’ (Note: Gavoty 1980, p. 199)

These influences are well-balanced in the Quintet, and their significance should not be overstated. While "the pantheistic impulses and deep anguish of this score naturally place it in the lineage of Franck's prestigious model, listening reveals an authenticity far removed from mere imitation."

In truth, "Vierne managed to remain true to himself, a remarkable achievement with unfortunate consequences for his career as a composer. Yet he held firm, and he was right to do so." (Note: Gavoty 1980, p. 211) His independent attitude also earned him unexpected allies, such as Saint-Saëns, who enjoyed his improvisations on the organ. "He, the ultimate purist, laughed at the young colleague's harmonic audacities and invariably concluded with a lisped, 'That scratches!'"

=== Aesthetic vision ===
Musicologists often summarize Louis Vierne's aesthetic with a principle that particularly defines his chamber music: "I had only one goal: to move." (Note: Gavoty 1980, p. 183) Bernard Gavoty expanded on this, quoting the composer's own words with their delightful spontaneity:

Advice? Recipes? I’d be utterly incapable of giving any. Principles? That’s easier, although, in truth, my entire doctrine boils down to this: to move. It’s a small word, but a big thing. And not easy, I assure you. You think you've done it, and then, not at all: you simply bore people and, as a result, bore yourself. Boring others, one might tolerate, but boring oneself—now that’s truly boring [...]

The emotion dominates both in his inspiration and expression, as well as in his appreciation of music: "Nothing beats a Bach choral to get you back on track: it's like a big brother whispering in your ear... Nothing consoles better than this music, which people foolishly say is not sentimental. If by that they mean it's not cloying, fine. But it's deeply sentimental, and magnificently so."

According to him, "Franck was of the same breed, and so was Fauré. These were men who understood what msic could be. One day, I told Fauré that his second Violin and Piano Sonata had brought tears to my eyes; he responded, squeezing my arm so hard I screamed: 'Thank you. There is nothing more beautiful or better than crying for no reason. But still, what a strange profession we practice. We claim to entertain, to console, and we are only happy when we’ve made someone cry!' Ah! Yes. Crying is good, deep down, because you become a child again: I don't see what could be better."

Thus, as Jean Gallois points out, "the analysis of this Piano and String Quintet can be brief, as the writing and structure of the work are so clear."

== Work overview ==
With a well-developed form, Louis Vierne's Piano and String Quintet is a deliberately programmatic work, avoiding the easy path of "any picturesque effect" — in the Romantic tradition of Beethoven's Third Symphony "Eroica" and Fifth Symphony in C minor, which he loved, of Liszt’s Battle of the Huns and "Danse Macabre, or Berlioz's Symphonie fantastique, to whom he "venerated not only the musician but the man." (Note: Gavoty 1980, p. 155) If the Préludes Op. 36 are "a private diary" entrusted to the piano, the Op. 42 Quintet is a moving "funeral poem in which Vierne freely expresses his grief" with a sense of "dramaturgy" that musicologists have not failed to comment on.

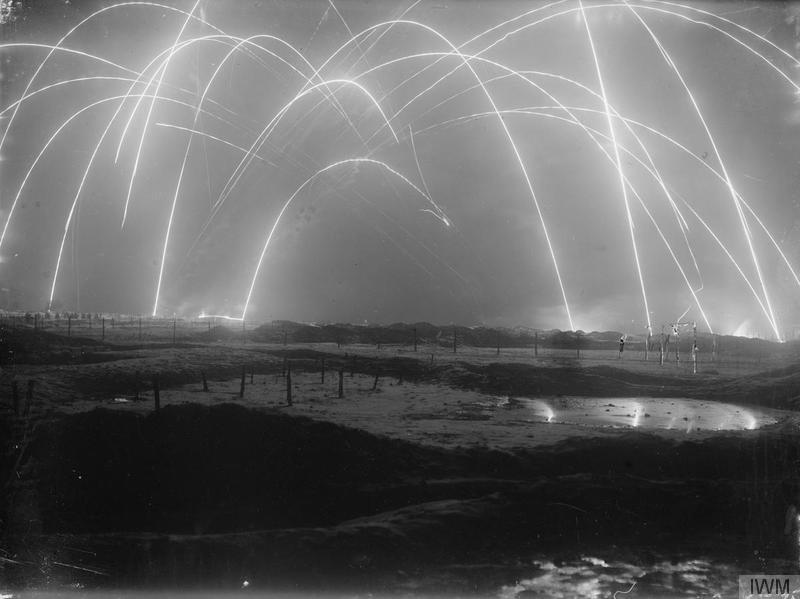
Ravaged fields and shellfire in the trenche.

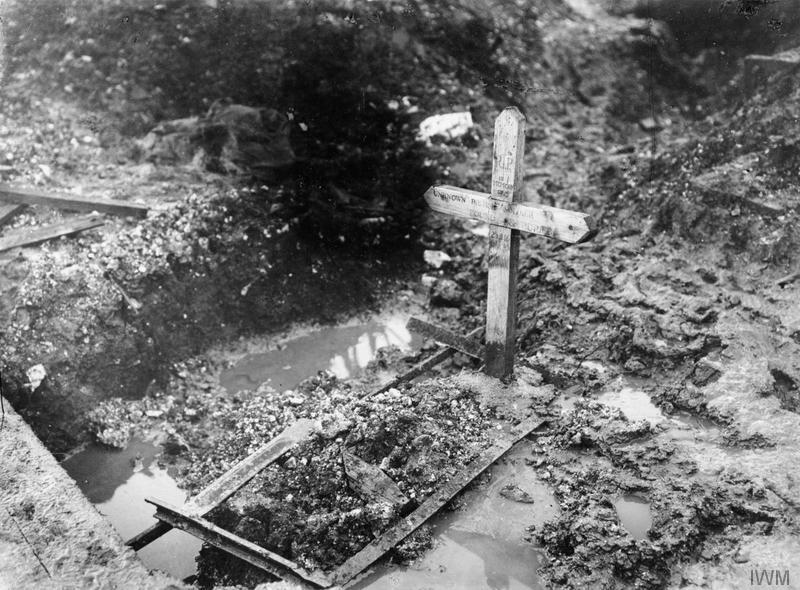
Makeshift grave at the scene of the fighting.

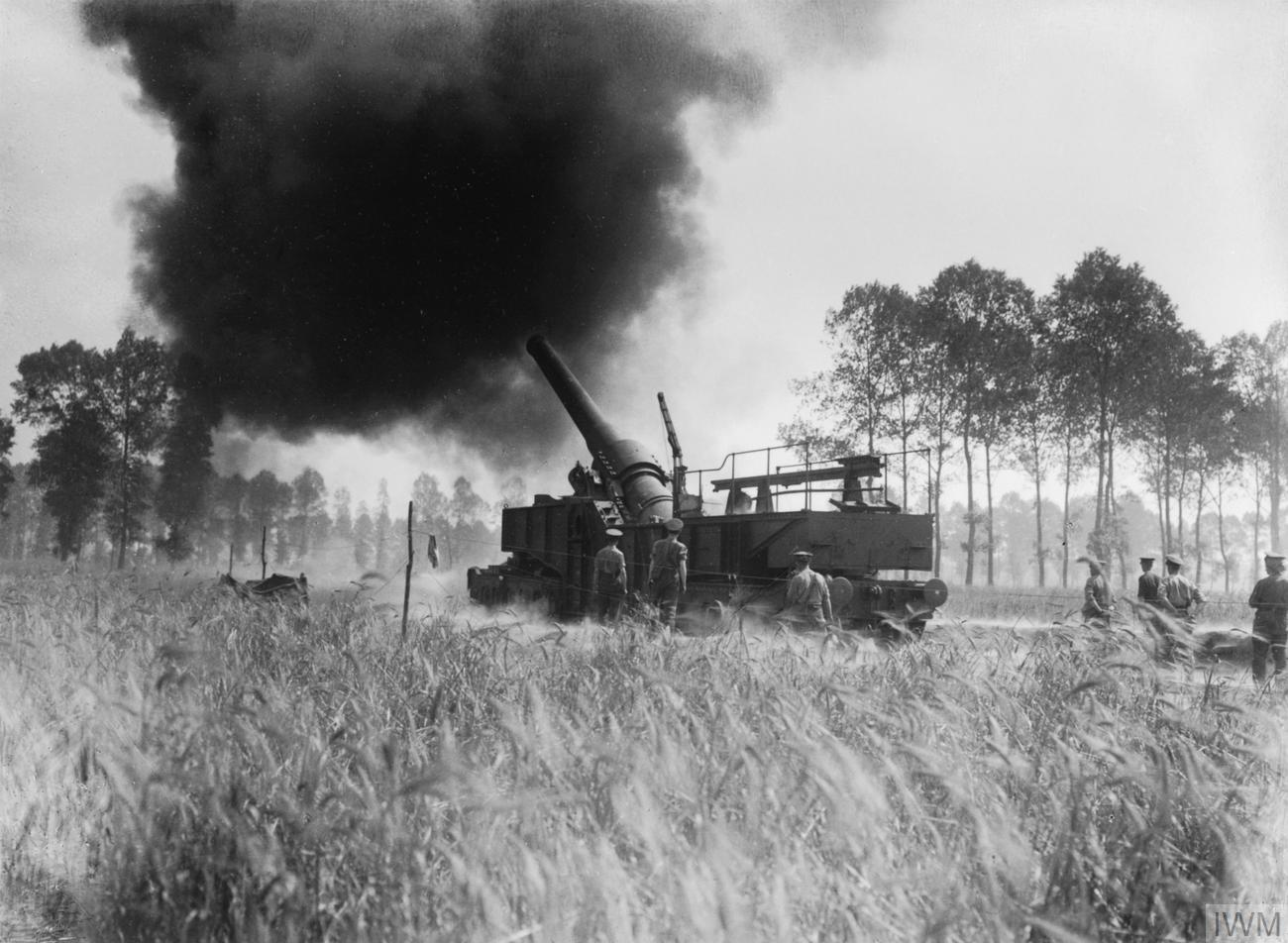
Guns in position - fighting resumes.

=== Poco lento – Moderato ===
From the first measures at the piano, "tinged with intense chromaticism, we know that we are about to enter the heart of a drama." The key of C minor "finally emerges" from the string instruments' discourse, with a first "brutal and heroic" call. Thus, "severity, but also pain and an elegiac rage, dominate the opening movement." From a technical perspective, Bernard Gavoty argues that "Vierne uses his usual techniques: the exposition of two themes at the entrance of the lively movements, recalling central ideas in each section, without true 'cycling,' duality of themes." (Note: Gavoty 1980, p. 270)

The organist-composer's technique remains subtly present in the balance of the quintet: the piano "imposes a soft authority on the Poco lento which leads into the Moderato, a call-and-response pattern based on a liturgical model." A change of key with four flats introduces the "lament of the cello", a new theme marked by "a poignant sadness, characterized by tonal ambiguity between A-flat major and F-sharp minor" and "admirable plasticity."

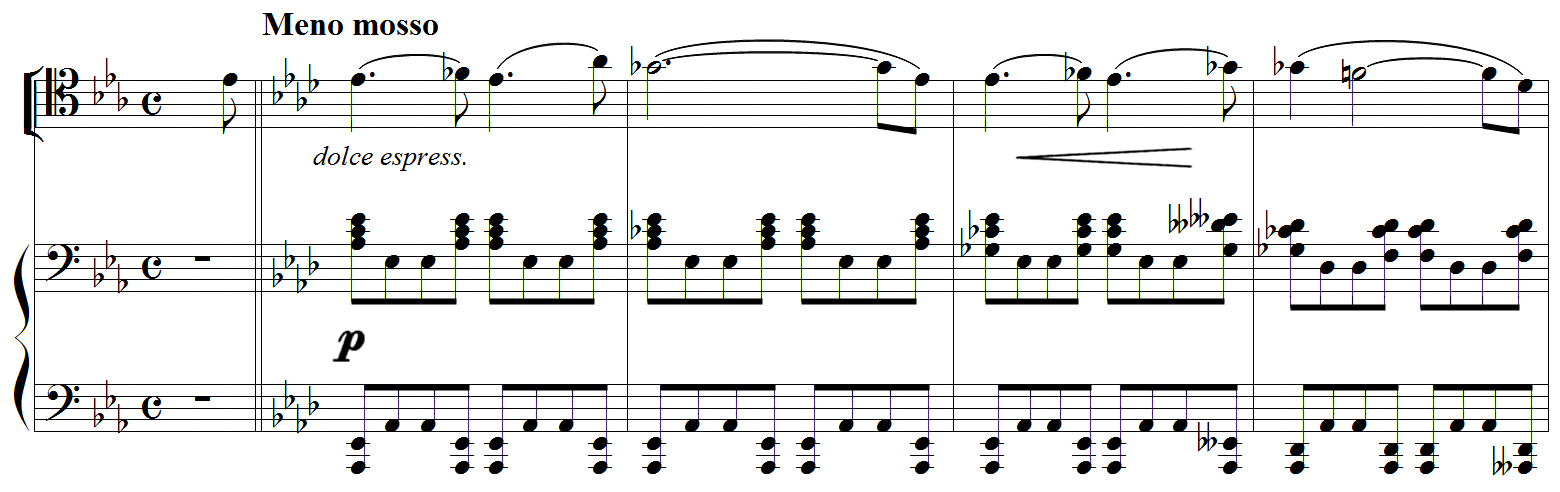
Louis Vierne – Quintet, op. 42 (1st movement, bars 38–42) Listen to Quintet op. 42, 1st movement (mes. 38-46):

The development "opposes and amplifies the two motifs by a sharp reversal of the piano through wide chords", reaching "an immense climax where the quartet in unison confronts a succession of chords with harmonic and rhythmic density worthy of Rachmaninoff." Vierne had met the Russian composer and pianist at their mutual friend Raoul Pugno’s home, and musicologist Konstantin Galluhn suggests a comparison with thematic material from Rachmaninoff's Piano Concerto.

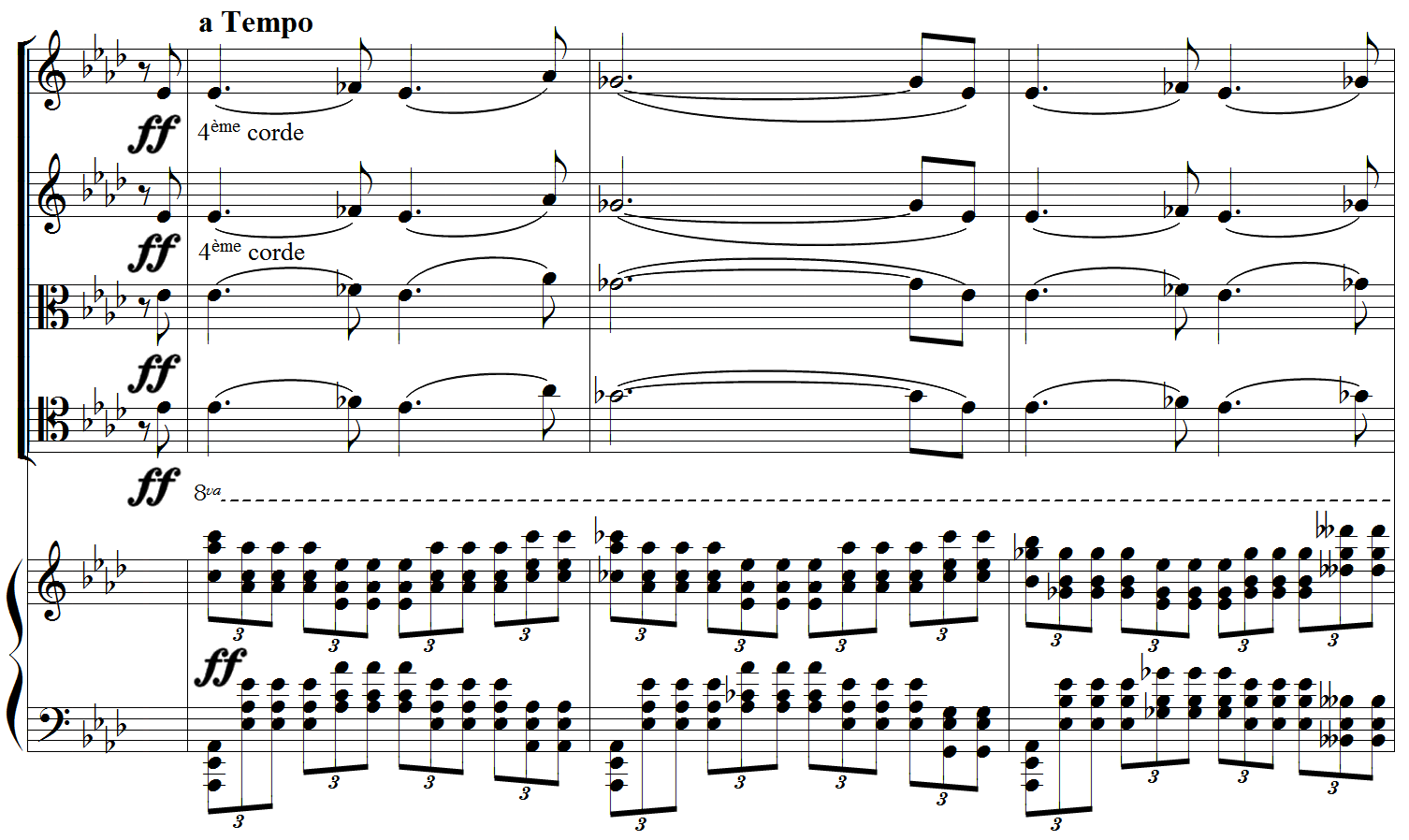
Louis Vierne – Quintet, op. 42 (1st movement, mes. 67–69) Listen to Quintet op. 42, 1st movement (mes. 67-74):

The return of the initial theme at the piano is "traversed by the string instruments’ angry outbursts, turning into a sort of fantastic gallop, a premonitory vision of the battlefield that will become the essence of the Finale." At the end of the development, "an episode, where the bows tremble on an eerie pianistic swell, prepares the final return of the first theme in a frenzied explosion marking the peak of the movement."

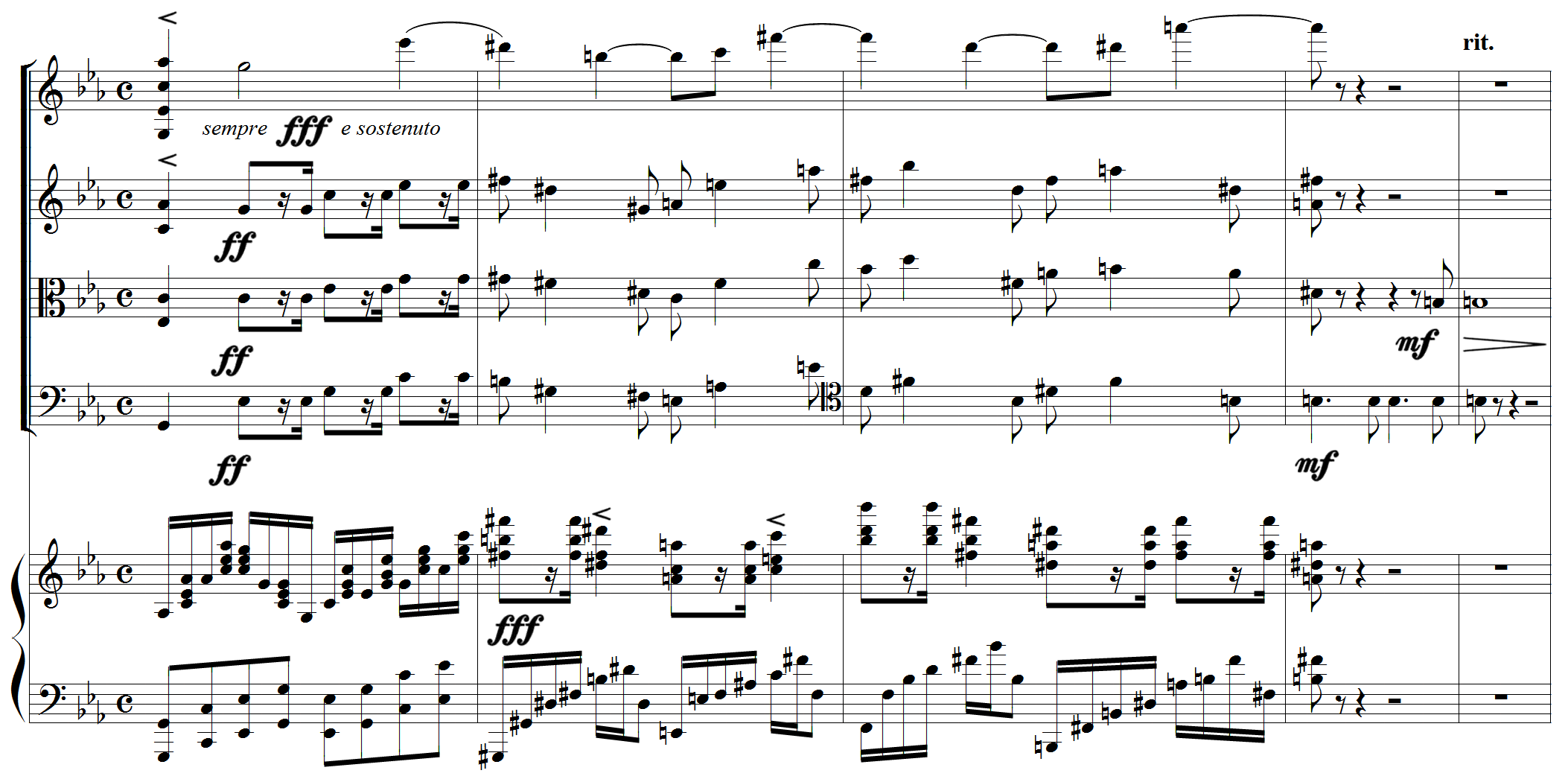
Louis Vierne – Quintet, op. 42 (1st movement, mes.183–187) Listen to Quintet op. 42, 1st movement (mes. 178-187):

The movement "ends in sweetness. This technique, often used by Fauré, is quite rare for Vierne; perhaps the composer felt that the overall work tone called for it. It has the advantage of introducing the slow movement naturally, without the jarring break that often marks the disparate nature of sonata form." (Note: Gavoty 1980, pp. 270–271)

=== Larghetto sostenuto ===
The second movement begins with sixteen measures given to the string quartet, preparing the piano entrance. From the first measures, "one is struck by the desolate lullaby sung by the viola while the first and second violins evoke, with their eighth-quarter rhythms, the slow, unsteady step of a funeral procession." The second theme is even more sinister, a long chromatic descent from the piano, representing the burial. While Vierne "can unite or oppose forces to the point of rupture and cries, under the impulse of his hypersensitivity, he also achieves almost ethereal sounds through the muted strings, superimposed on the pure line of the viola."

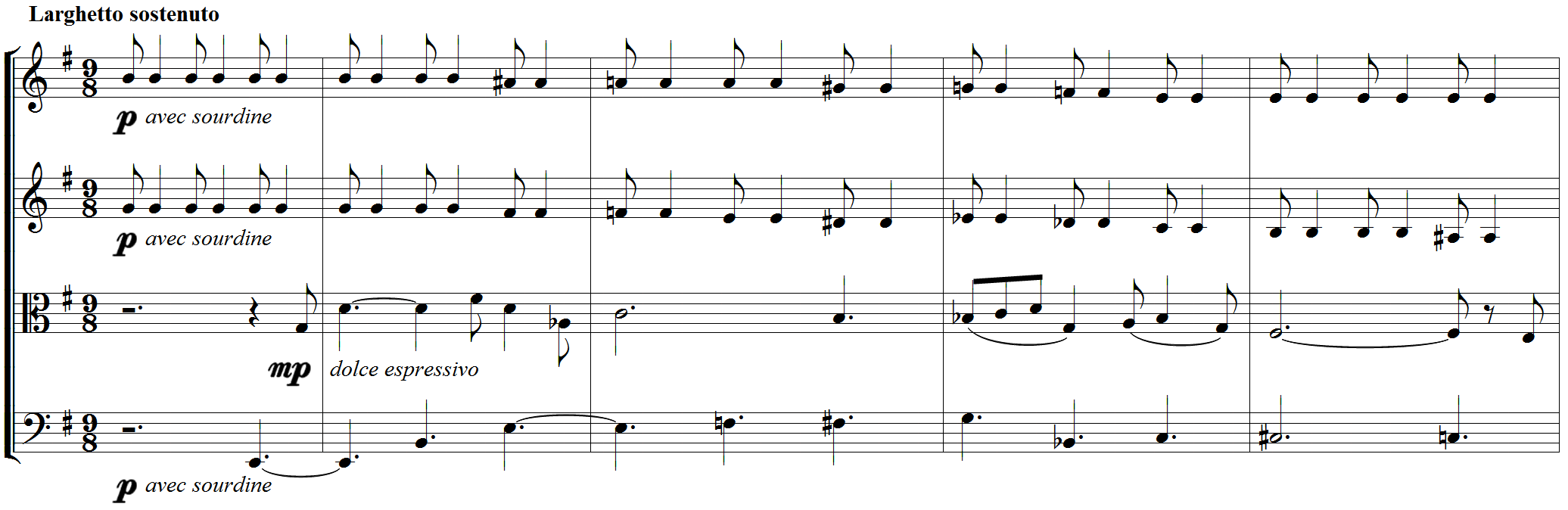
Louis Vierne – Quintet, op. 42 (2nd movement, mes 1–5) Listen to Quintet op. 42, 2nd movement (mes. 1-16):

The theme is a "quiet chant as if whispered." This slow movement, "like a meditation on death, leads to a biting Agitato, as if the distress finds no anchor." Bernard Gavoty praises the composer's ingenuity, noting how "he refreshes the formula of the adagio, which sometimes suffers from excess length when the ideas are poorly chosen or the themes insufficient; here, the pathos of the discourse sustains interest from start to finish." (Note: Gavoty 1980, p. 271) A new element, "an admirable cantilena first from the viola, then from the cello, wrapped in arpeggios by the piano and trills by the violins", conveys "a sweet, tender reverie, recalling the memory of happier days."

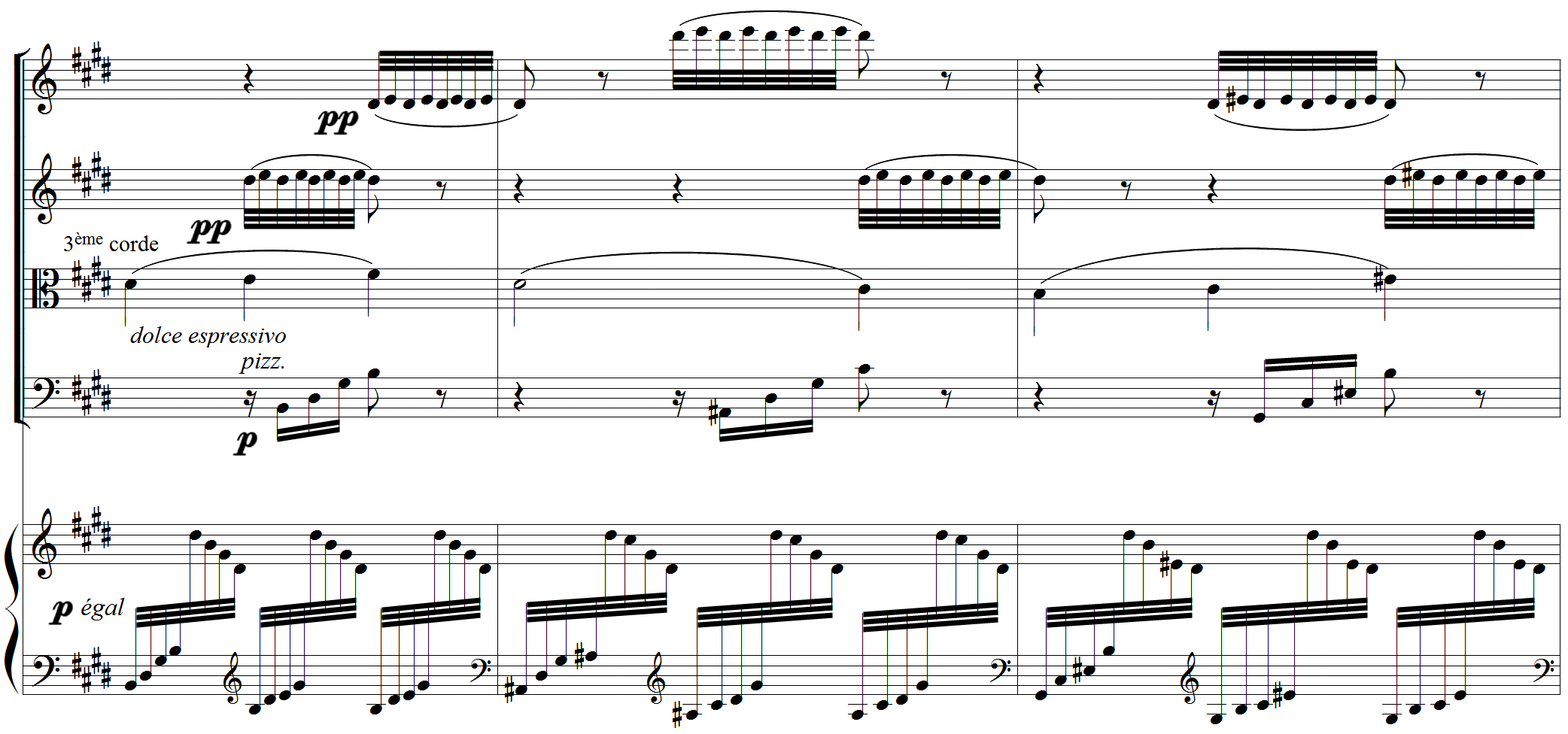
Louis Vierne – Quintet, op. 42 (2nd movement, bars 58–60) Listen to Quintet op. 42, 2nd movement (mes. 58-65):

These elements suggest a connection with Gabriel Fauré’s Piano and String Quartet No. 2, but "the expression rises again to the most vehement pain." The intensity of the discourse is such that "one wonders if Vierne was familiar with Frank Bridge's imposing Piano Quintet, composed in the previous decade", while also directly anticipating "the bitter Piano Sonata of 1922–1925, which also commemorates the memory of a victim of the Great War."

The development of the two melodic motifs creates "great arcs of tension" throughout the movement. The return of the second theme "appears noticeably modified and amplified. It becomes a tremendous cry of suffering, revolt, and despair before the irreversible, climax of moral distress:"

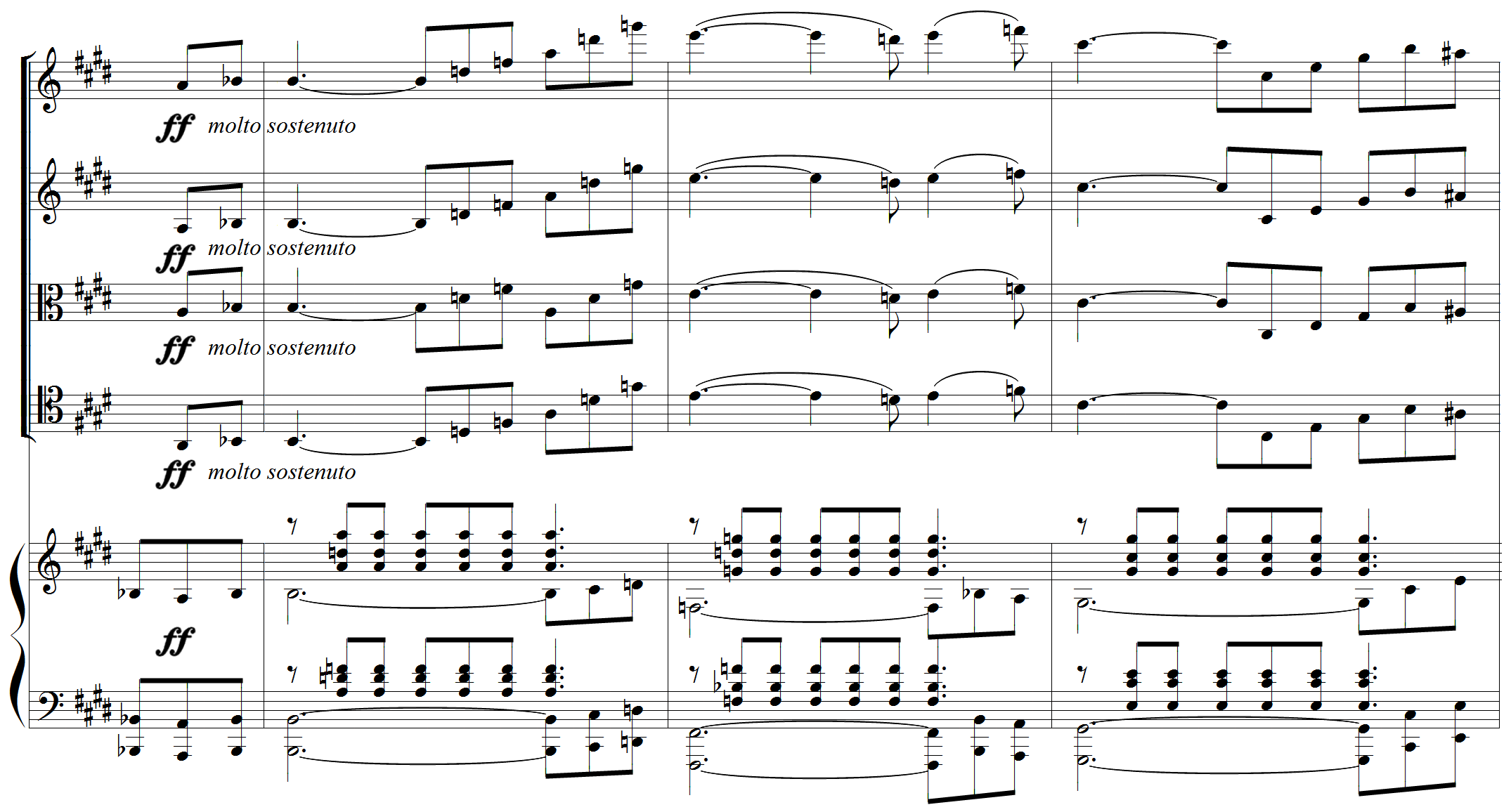
Louis Vierne – Quintet, op. 42 (2nd movement, bars 115–118) Listen to Quintet op. 42, 2nd movement (mes. 104-125):

In its progressive animation, the movement "transforms into a noble funeral march in C-sharp minor, punctuated by some drum rolls recalling that Vierne's son 'died for France.' The third section of this movement, with occasionally Schumann-like accents, ends in the deepest desolation." The conclusion "involves the grim second theme that sinks forever into the bowels of the earth, and a final reminder at the piano of the first theme, almost as if closing the grave."

=== Maestoso – Allegro molto risoluto ===
In the second movement, Vierne focused on expressing his torments, while the Finale describes their cause: the horrific slaughter of World War I. The introduction is marked by the same tonal uncertainty as at the start of the first movement. It begins with a Maestoso where groups of six violently dissonant chords slam on the piano like gunshots, alternating with the string section sketching out the main theme, which derives from the first theme of the Larghetto:

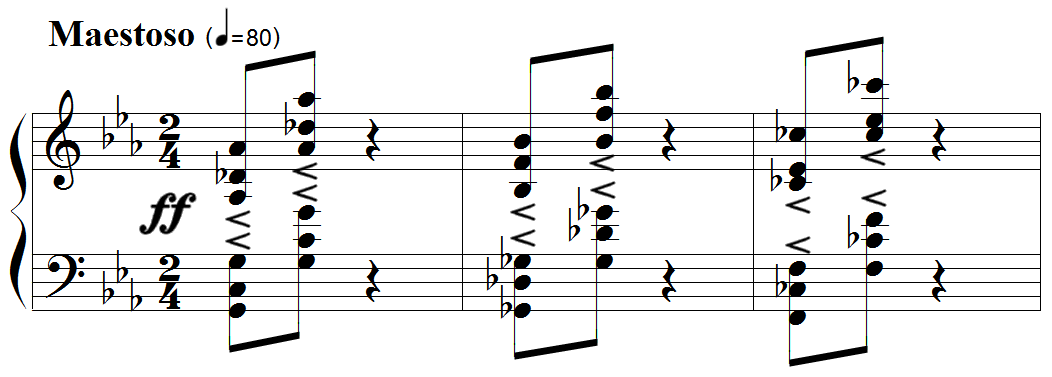
Louis Vierne – Quintet, op. 42 (3rd movement, mes. 1–3) Listen to Quintet op. 42, (3rd movement, mes. 1-3)

This final movement, "of colossal strength", certainly marks a rejection of fate: the harsh and dissonant piano chords, fortissimo, propel the movement into the Allegro molto risoluto, relentless like a hurricane. The discourse is built around a "tumultuous, panting, fierce theme" that drives the fighters to assault enemy positions in a heroic charge:

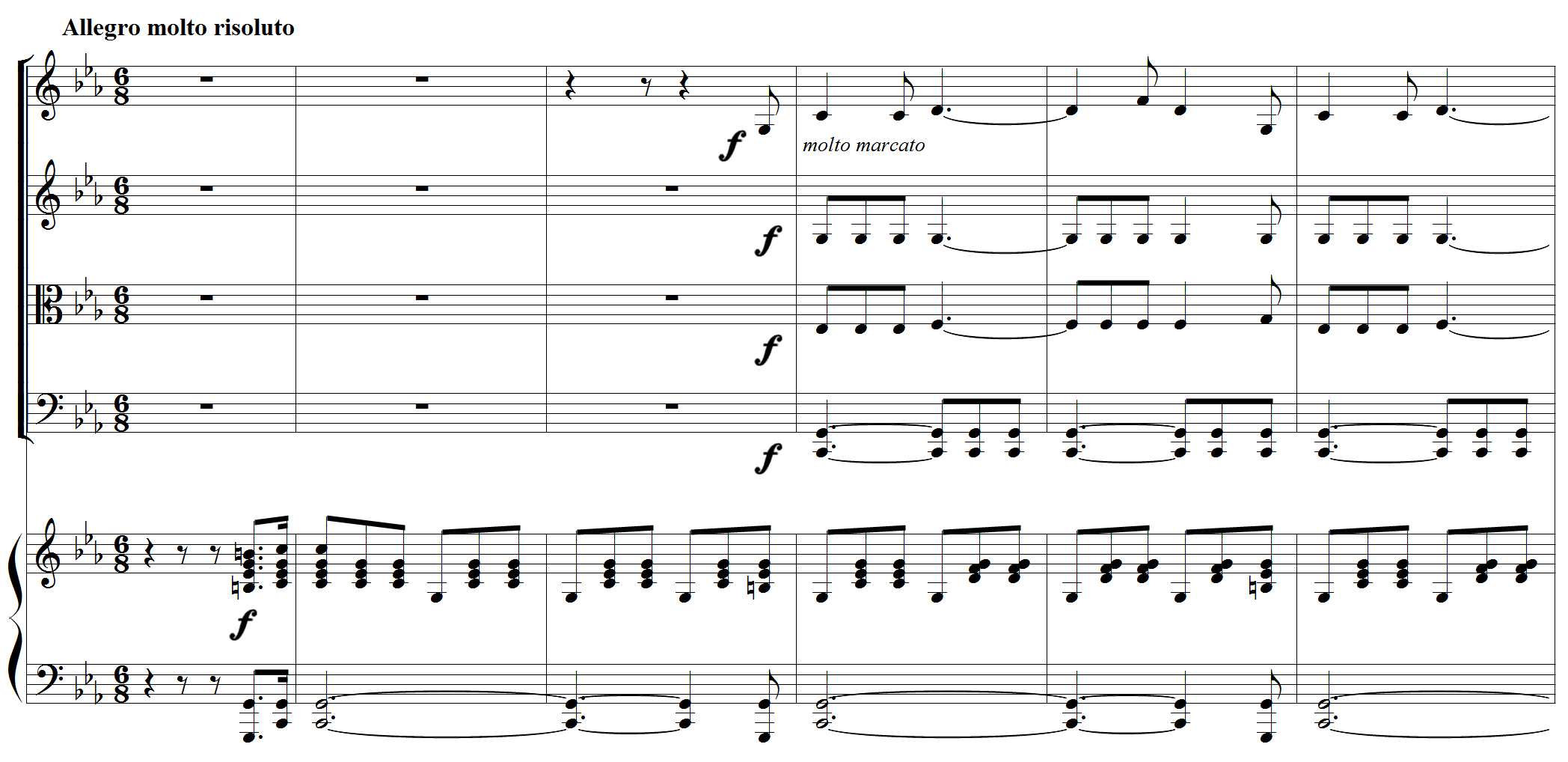
Louis Vierne – Quintet, Op. 42 (3rd movement, bars 62–67) Listen to Quintet op. 42, (3rd movement, mes 62-79)

The movement "gains real momentum through a theme that marches forward in triple time." "One might momentarily think they hear the scherzo from Schubert's great Quintet in C major for Strings, inexplicably played in the minor key." The main theme "then emerges, disjointed from the relentless pulse, suggesting a parallel with the cunning of the final pages of Brahms’ String Quintet in F major, Op. 88."

This "furious war ride" is also reminiscent of the Finale of Vierne's Symphony No. 4 for Organ: "Its rhythm perfectly illustrates the 'roar of thunder' intended by the composer." But "suddenly, on the same frantic rhythm, a sardonic, creaking scherzo forms a Danse Macabre, where the hollow sound of bones is perfectly suggested by the staccato of the piano and the pizzicati of the strings."

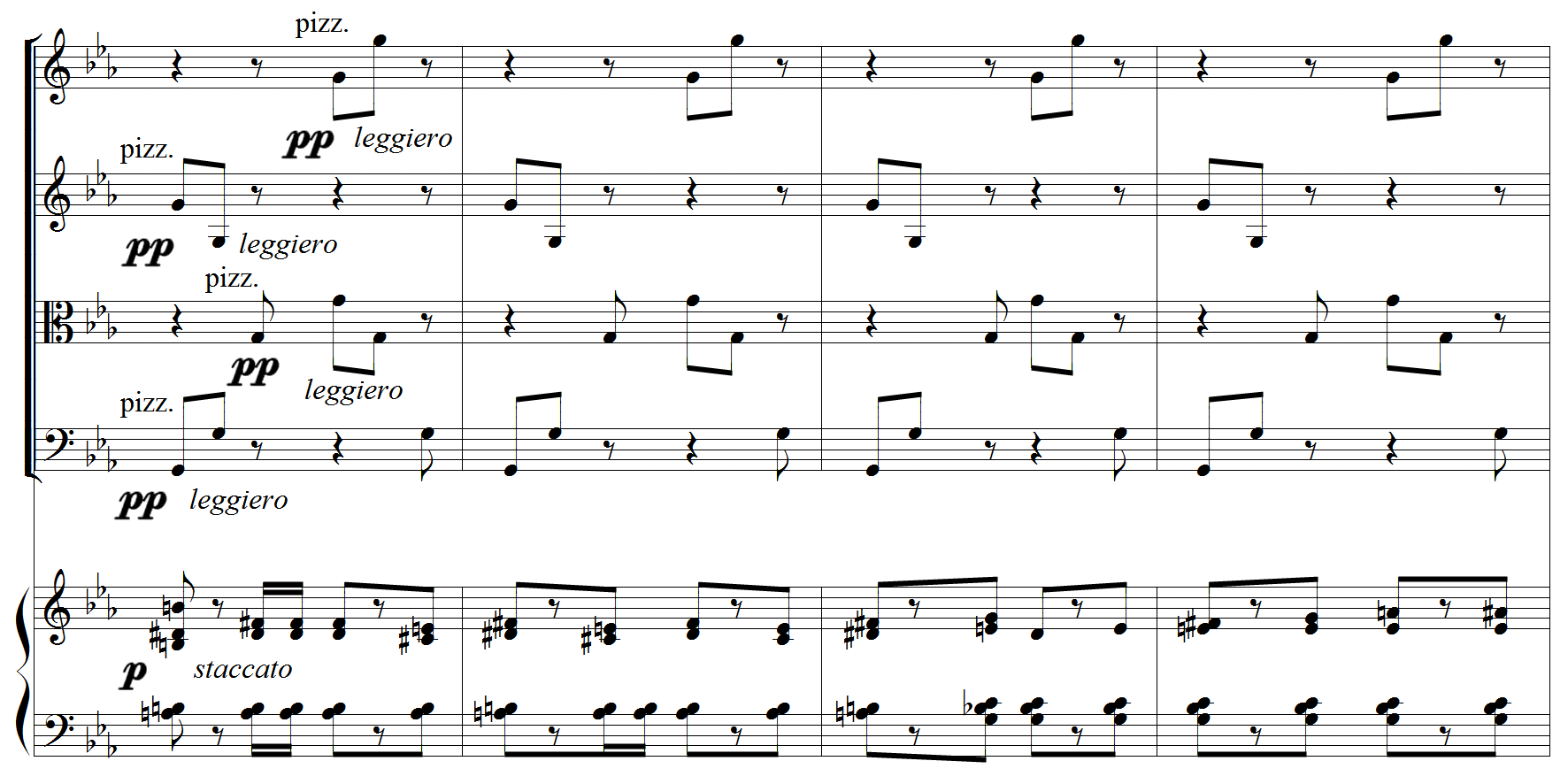
Louis Vierne – Quintet, op. 42 (3rd movement, bars 134–137) Listen to Quintet op. 42, (3rd movement, mes. 128-162)

This passage is repeated with insistence on dissonance, as the string quartet hammers F across four octaves against F—or its enharmonic, E♭—in the piano's melodic line: Vierne had a fondness for "these harsh harmonies that 'bang,' as he put it!" (Note: Besingrand 2011, p. 119)

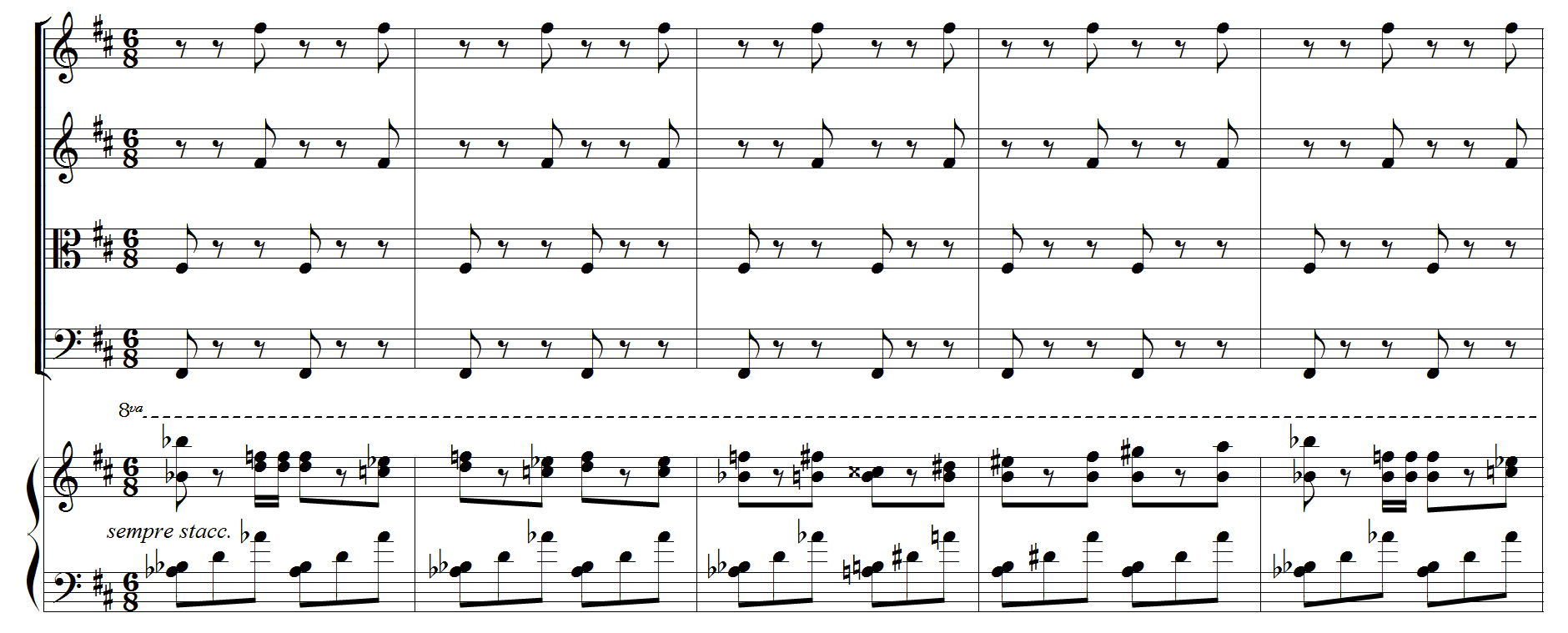
Louis Vierne – Quintet, op. 42 (3rd movement, mes. 242–246) Listen to Quintet op. 42, (3rd movement, mes. 242-246)

This "ambivalence between the burlesque and the nightmare" resolves, as expected, into a central section filled with "a deathly silence." In this Grave passage, "mysterious, where Vierne once again abandons tonal language to describe the almost unreal atmosphere of a suddenly deserted battlefield, the recapitulation of the gloomy theme from the first movement sends shivers down the spine: through the layers of stagnant smoke, one can make out the shapeless mass of the dead and wounded, from which convulsive sobs and groans escape."

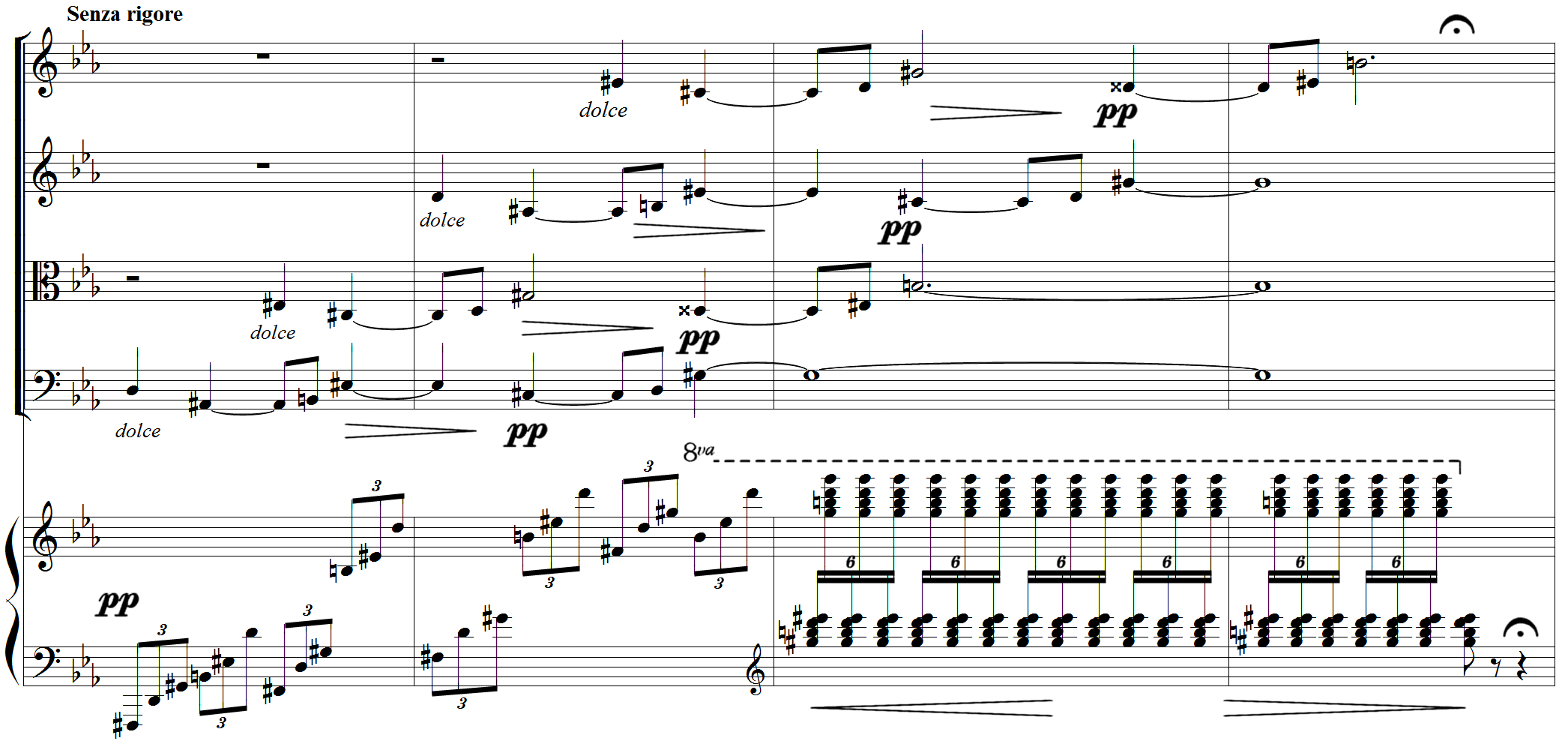
Louis Vierne – Quintet op. 42, (3rd movement, mes. 284–287) Listen to Quintet op. 42, (3rd movement, mes. 284-290)

After this unbearable vision, a heavy reversal of meaning occurs: "The carnage resumes with the relentless return of the main theme. A slight decrease in the intensity of battle briefly gives way to the second theme from the first movement, the ultimate cyclical reminder, preparing us for the race to the abyss, the total cataclysm." The progressive animation of the Finale "seems to hurl us to the edge of some abyss..." The movement, marked Piu animato (measure 392), builds to the coda.

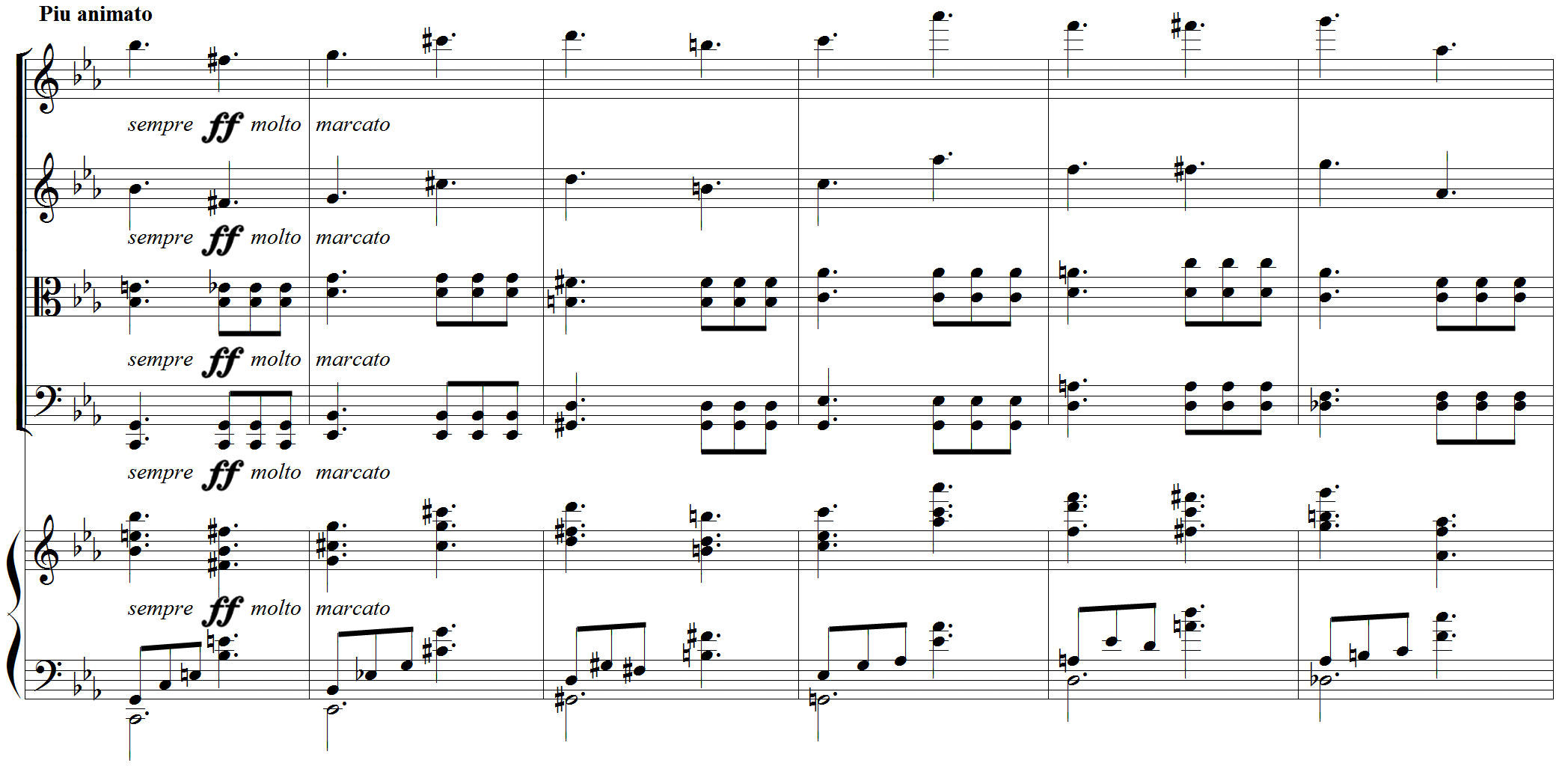
Louis Vierne – Quintet op. 42, (3rd movement, bars. 392–397) Listen to Quintet op. 42, (3rd movement, mes. 392-432)

The final progression is worthy of Schubert's best pages, "whose use of this same device in the Finale of the magnificent Piano Trio in E♭ major is one of the most eloquent strokes of genius in that work. Vierne handles it beautifully with several ingenious harmonic transformations." These last measures "summon a storm of military sounds, demonic laughter, and inexorable entanglements."

The Piano and String Quintet thus ends "with powerful chords confirming the pitiless C minor", which "strikes down, inevitable." However, while "this tormented work makes an impact with striking contrasts where the piano competes for supremacy against the strings in successive monologues or concerted flourishes", it bids farewell to the listener, leaving them "with a feeling of stunned confusion and anger." This violent Finale, as Bernard Gavoty expressed, "ends in the tragic tone of C minor, as if this time, tradition alone could not impose the often artificial light of the major key (Note: Franck Besingrand presents the coda of Vierne's Quintet for Piano and Strings as "in a brilliant C major.") on a work that is, above all, a funeral chant."

== Legacy ==
The Piano and String Quintet, Op. 42, is one of the key works in Louis Vierne's output. After a concert at the Salle Pleyel on May 6, 1922, where the Quintet and the Five Poems of Baudelaire, Op. 45 were performed, Maurice Blazy introduced his friend and former classmate at the National Institute for Blind Youth as a model "both in his career and the influence he had on a whole generation of young people who consider him a leader." However, the critic for Le Monde musical saw Vierne as "one of the noblest musicians of our time, but too modest, too lost in his dreams. He lived in isolation and did not always get the recognition he deserved."

=== Oblivion ===
Louis Vierne died on June 2, 1937, (Note: Gavoty 1980, pp. 177–178) at the end of his 1,750th concert at the organ loft of Notre-Dame de Paris (Note: Besingrand 2011, p. 105)—or, as Émile Bourdon put it, "at his post of battle." (Note: Besingrand 2011, p. 106) Two years later, Gustave Samazeuilh forgot to mention him among the French composers who had died in 1937, a year that was "ruthless for French music", marked by the deaths of "famous organist Charles-Marie Widor, composer of noble stature" (March 12), Gabriel Pierné (July 17), Albert Roussel (August 23), and Maurice Ravel (December 28). No mention was made the following year either in Samazeuilh's article commemorating the fiftieth anniversary of César Franck's death, in which he briefly mentioned some of Franck's students, from Henri Duparc to Gaston Carraud.

We must turn to Vierne's organ works to affirm, with Franck Besingrand, that "over the years, Vierne was never truly forgotten and managed to escape the dreaded purgatory that so many composers face!" (Note: Besingrand 2011, p. 110) In 1977, in La musique, from the night of time to the new dawn, Antoine Goléa only mentioned Louis Vierne and Charles Tournemire as organists, not composers. (Note: Among César Franck’s students, Antoine Goléa distinguishes those "who, almost all, became famous: Vierne and Tournemire as organists, but especially Vincent d'Indy, Chausson, Henri Duparc, Lekeu, Ropartz, Pierné as composers.")

Jean-Pierre Mazeirat wonders "why such admirable works do not occupy the place they deserve in the history of music. The causes are multiple: we know how organists who venture to write for instruments other than theirs face unfavorable prejudice. Even during his lifetime, Vierne was rarely performed outside the organ domain. After his death, things could only worsen. It must be acknowledged that his case is far from unique, as, aside from Debussy and Ravel, all French composers from 1870 to 1940 were more or less held in unjust purgatory for over forty years." It was not until the early 1980s that Vierne's chamber music was truly "rediscovered with passion, both through concerts and recordings."

=== Criticism ===
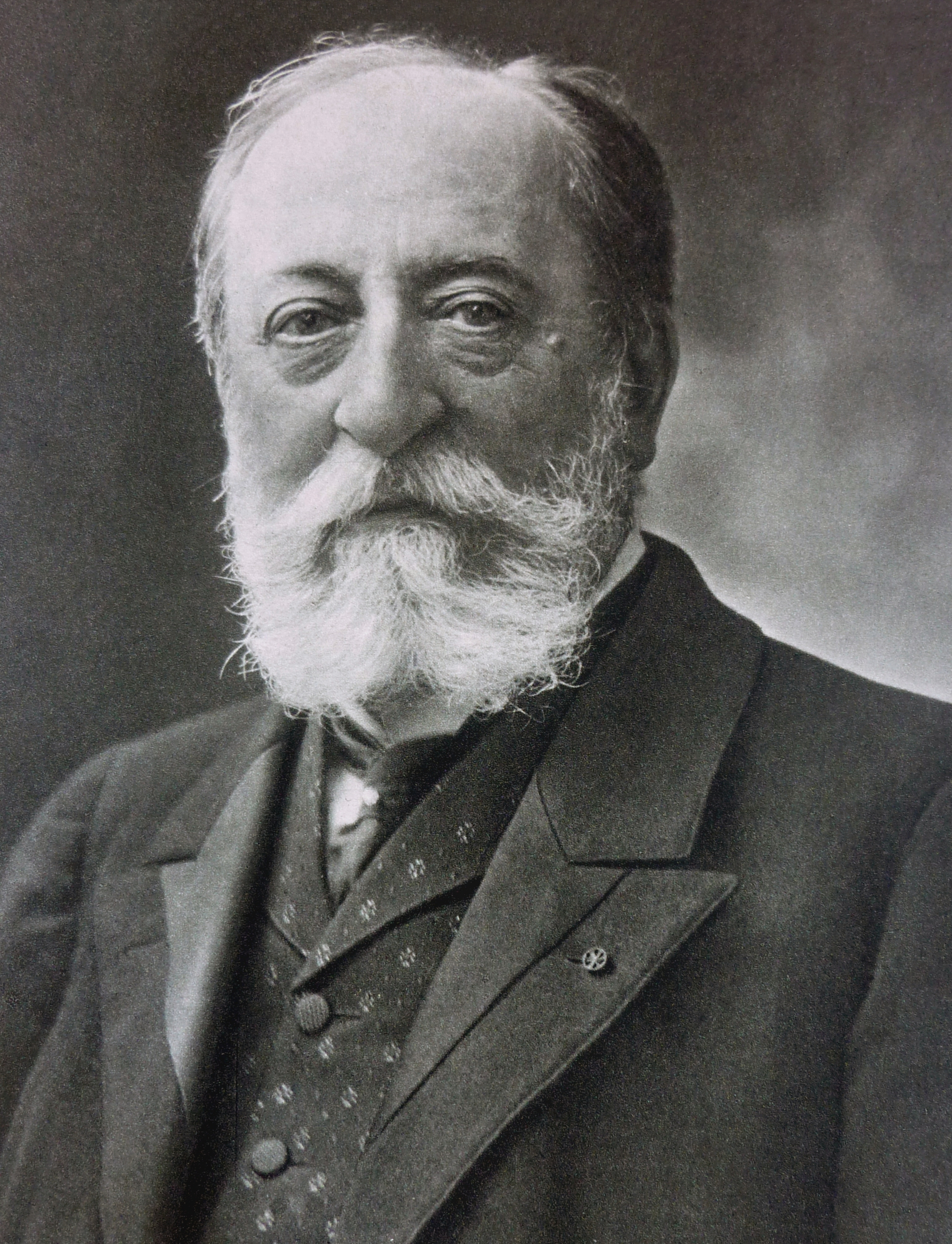
Camille Saint-Saëns
(1835-1921)

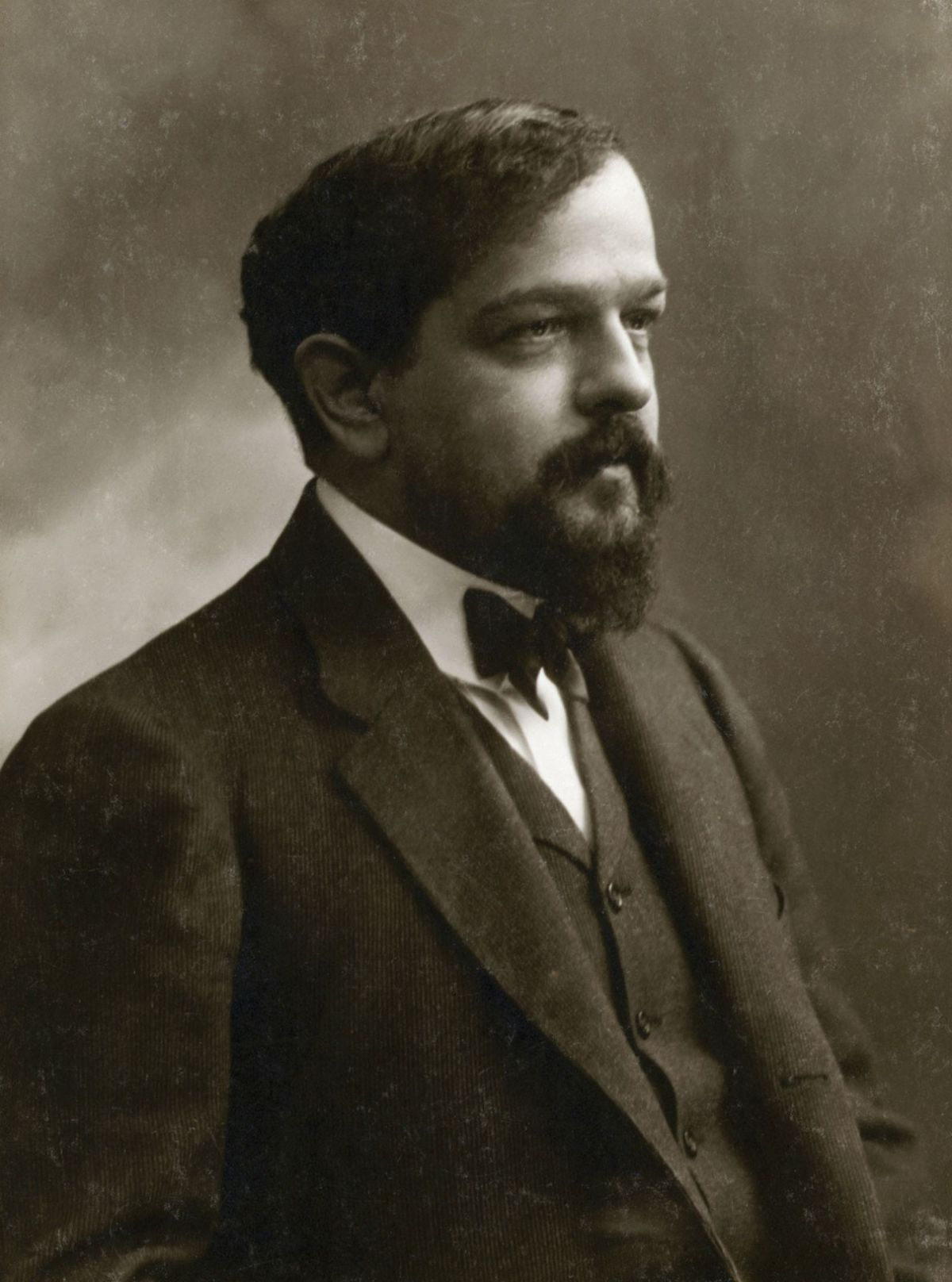
Claude Debussy
(1862-1918)

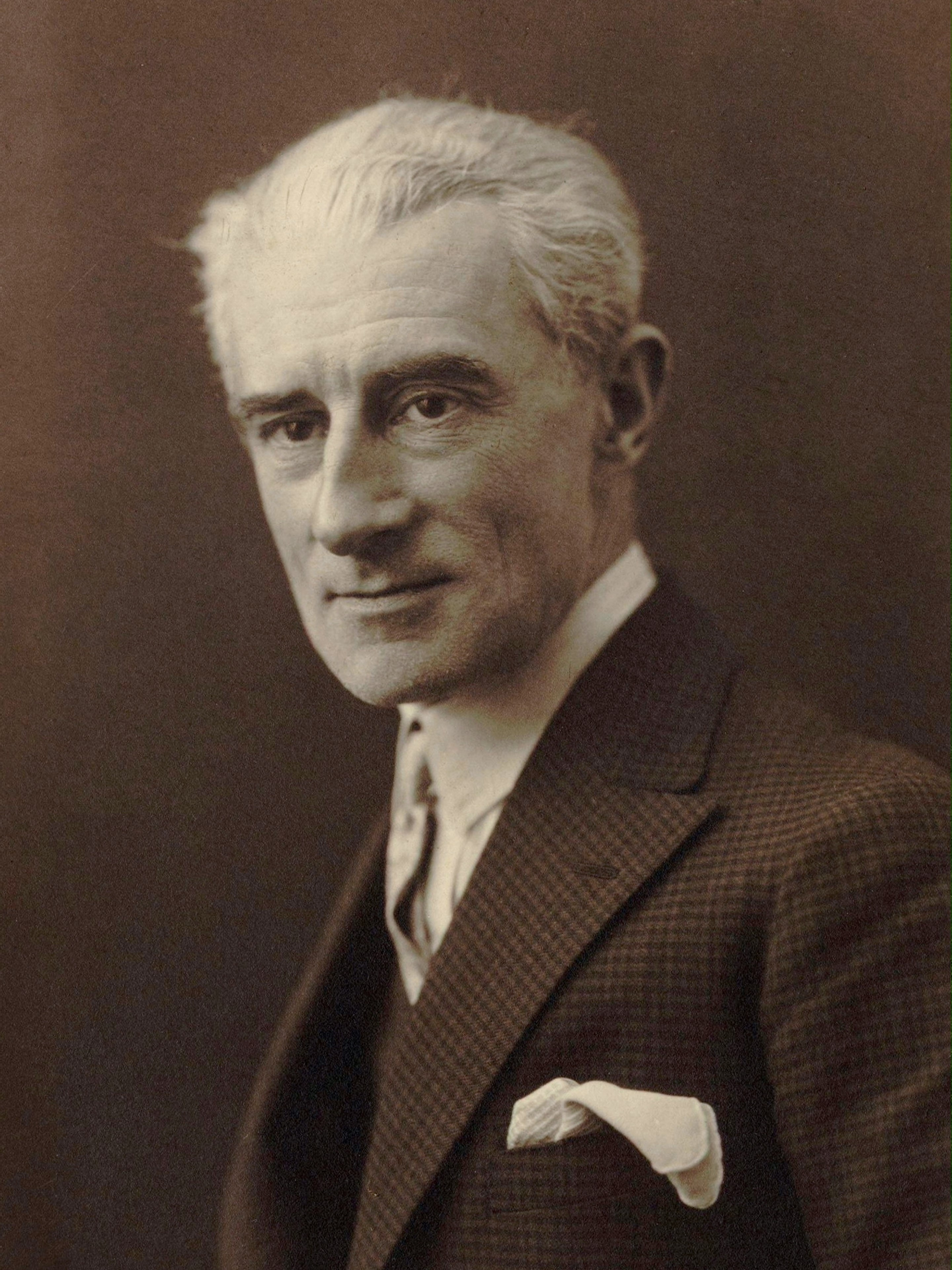
Maurice Ravel
(1875-1937)

The Piano and Strings Quintet by Louis Vierne has received a mix of critical responses due to its complexity, emotional depth, and intense expression. On the one hand, its demanding technique and emotional weight make it an intimidating and sometimes overwhelming work. Franck Besingrand, in his 2011 monograph, suggests that such a masterpiece can leave the listener "speechless with emotion."

The criticisms directed at the Quintet mainly concern its romantic character, which reflects the personality of its composer. Bernard Gavoty emphasizes this point: "a resolute anti-Impressionist", (Note: Gavoty 1980, p. 235) he writes, "Vierne knew he was a Romantic, and he held to it." (Note: Gavoty 1980, p. 182) Antoine Reboulot similarly describes him as "a Romantic with all the qualities and faults of the genre—violent passions, and excessive mood swings." (Note: Besingrand 2011, p. 142)

For some music critics, such as Philippe Simon in Répertoire, the Quintet Op. 42, composed in 1917, is described as being "totally torn and almost shameless in its flood of released pain", especially in the central Larghetto, which he argues is not a mere resting place. This music, "stretched to the extreme", even unsettles those who recognize its artistic qualities, as Simon exclaims, "What science and what artistic honesty!" Despite this, it is acknowledged that the Quintet contains both rebellion and formal mastery, with remarkable efficiency in the return of themes and the effects of instrumentation, which range from organ-like to orchestral. Additionally, there is a sense of elegy, even a funeral march, in this deeply emotional work.

At the opposite extreme of Saint-Saëns’ aesthetic—advocating for harmonious and impeccable creation but deemed "cerebral, insensitive, if not insincere" according to Bernard Gavoty—and renewing the example of Berlioz, whom he admired and "unconsciously imitated", (Note: Gavoty 1980, pp. 211–212) Vierne defended his work and tastes with a certain vehemence:

I love in music what moves me, not what surprises me, much less what jars. I've fought many battles over this with many people, even with Ravel, who once, kindly, accused me of having a perverse tenderness for so-called romantic music—‘this music you listen to with your fists in front of your eyes,’ he said to me. I answered that I’d rather have my fists in front of my eyes than be forced to hold them in front of my ears… He laughed, I laughed, we laughed together. By the way, Ravel is a great man, whereas the others... (Note: Gavoty 1980, pp. 200–201)

In response to critiques of "a certain rigidity on the formal level", Franck Besingrand countered with "the solidity, the strong and uncompromising support for a balanced form, as though he were trying to root himself in life to avoid drifting"—acknowledging that "we are far from a Debussy or a Ravel, who, to varying degrees, seek to break the formal framework to gain more freedom." (Note: Besingrand 2011, p. 116) Moving away from impressionism, Vierne "rather favors a certain expressionism", (Note: Besingrand 2011, p. 133) whose characteristics, as noted by Norbert Dufourcq, include "chromaticism, sumptuous harmony, and an accentuated rhythm." When the Quintet was first performed in 1920, "we are far from Ravel's approach in his Sonata for violin and cello, where, in his own words, the sparseness is taken to the extreme." (Note: Franck Besingrand mentions the Violin Sonata No. 2, completed in 1927, which he confuses with the Sonata for Violin and Cello composed in 1920. Ravel’s comment applies to the latter composition: "The Sonata for Violin and Cello is from 1920, the time when I moved to Montfort-l'Amaury. I believe this sonata marks a turning point in my career. The sparseness is pushed to the extreme.") (Note: Besingrand 2011, p. 128)

In the article dedicated to Louis Vierne for his Dictionnaire de la musique, Marc Honegger admires "his art of constant spiritual elevation" but condemns as an anachronism "his essentially lyrical and, to a large extent, romantic nature; on this level, his work stands in opposition to most contemporary artistic currents. However, a work such as the Quintet can be considered a kind of masterpiece."

As early as 1943, Bernard Gavoty acknowledged that Vierne's aesthetic, "strongly asserted, can be considered, in our time and our country, as an anachronism. It was and still is, as it diverges too visibly from the modern tradition." The outpourings of expression are also viewed with suspicion, as being contrary to a certain French spirit, by a critic writing under the German occupation: "One can immediately see where Vierne departs from this ideal, first and foremost through this absence of sentimental restraint, which would associate him more with foreign romantics." (Note: Gavoty 1980, p. 214)

The composer had serious reasons for adhering to his conception of "sparingness" in music:

I don't believe that a musician who cannot love or suffer as a man—there are such people—will ever create something truly beautiful. Everything comes at a cost... sometimes very dearly, perhaps too dearly. Success comes too late, love fades too soon, happiness never arrives... I sometimes laugh softly at the response of those who think I’ve been compensated for my distress as a deprived child through the gift of music. These are two very different things. But what would be the point of going to war against life? (Note: Gavoty 1980, p. 207)

Thus concluded "the last of the great romantics", as his pupil Geneviève de La Salle put it.

=== Recognition ===
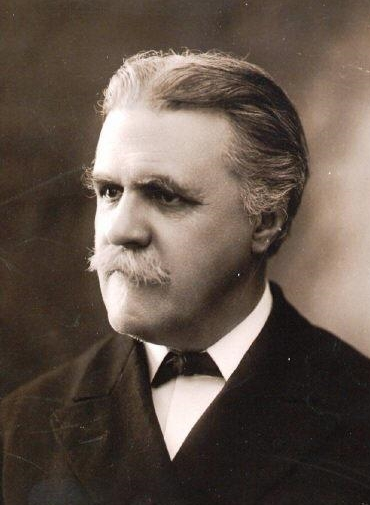
Vincent d'Indy
(1851-1931)

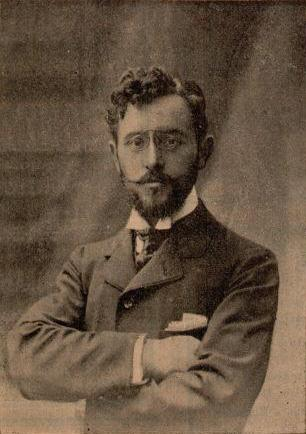
Florent Schmitt
(1870-1958)

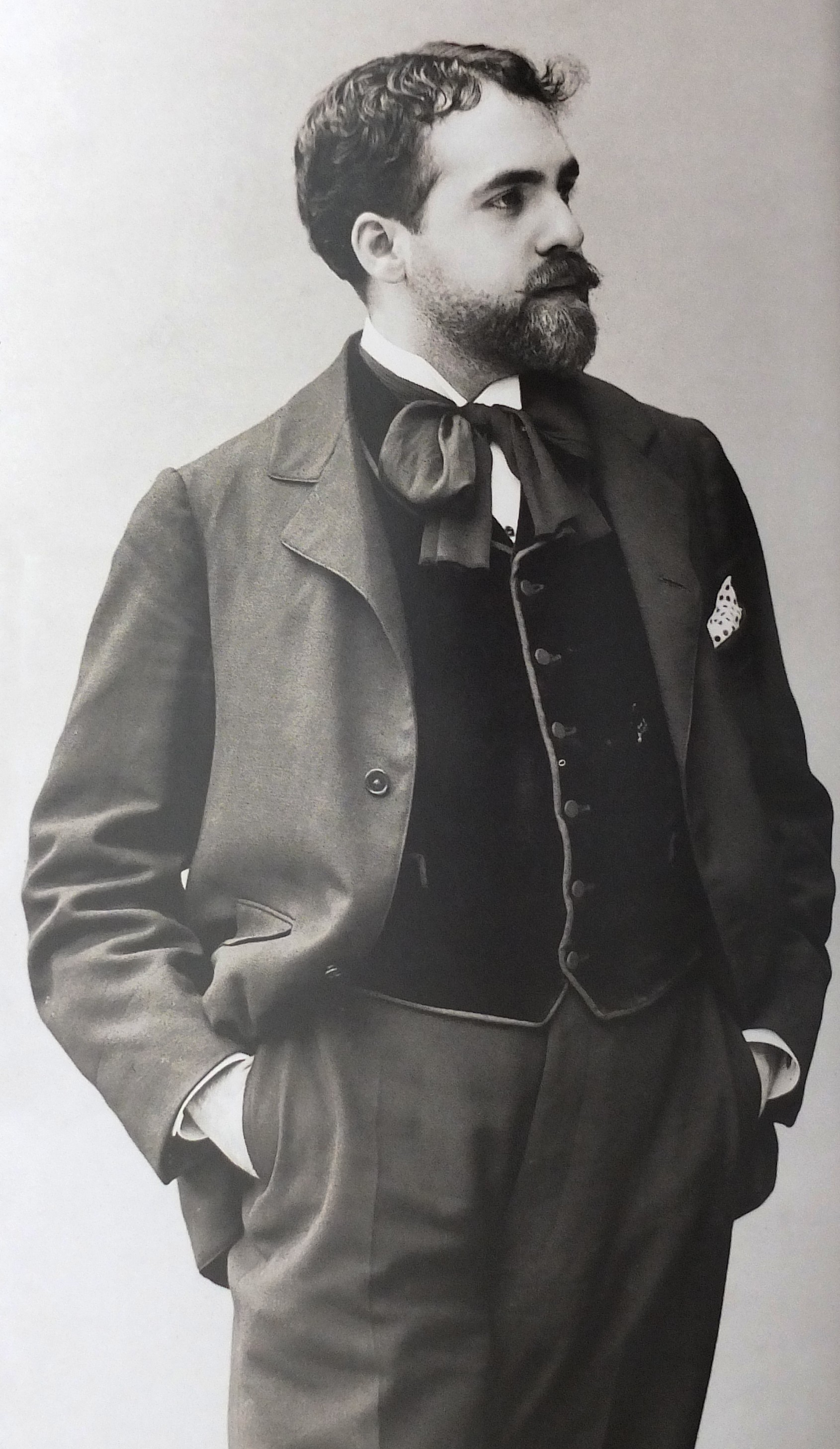
Reynaldo Hahn
(1874-1947)

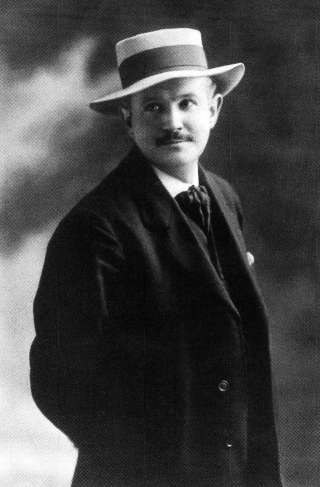
Gabriel Dupont
(1879-1914)

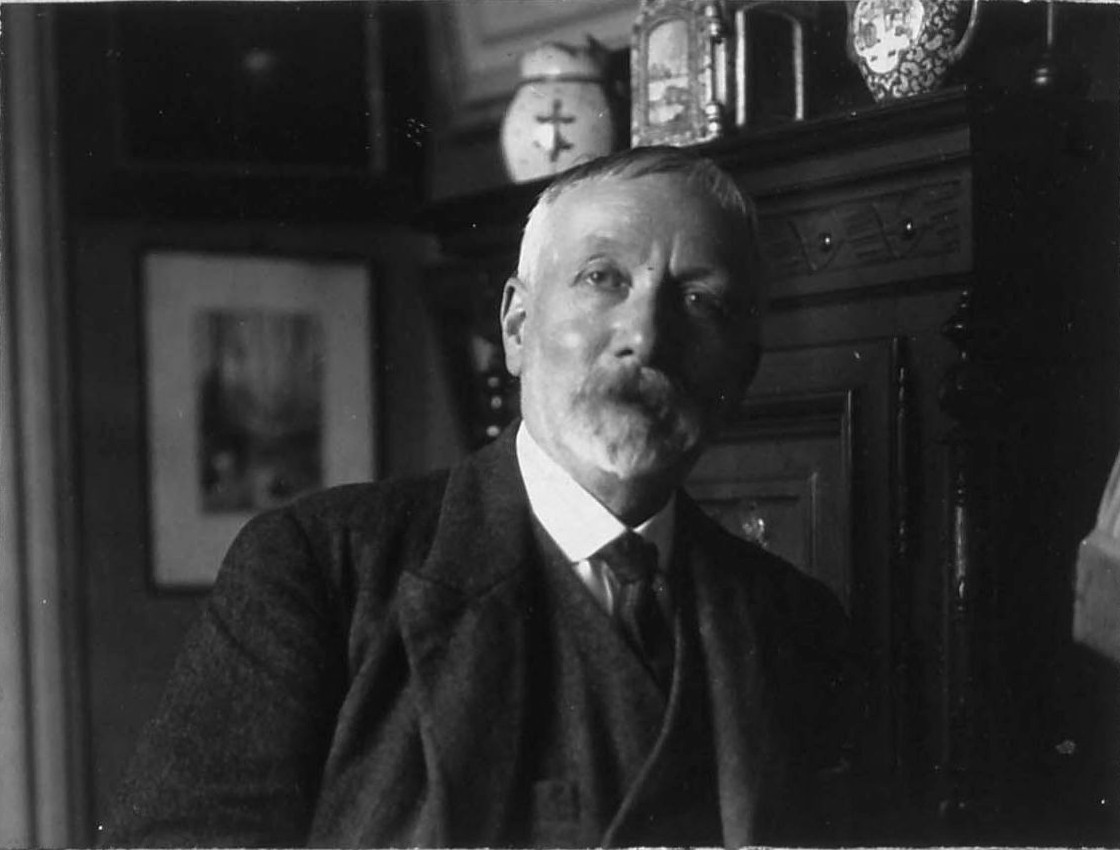
Gabriel Pierné
(1863-1937)

Bernard Gavoty may be critical when it comes to "formulating an objective judgment on a work that is itself so little objective. It is not from this angle that one can estimate its merits or, above all, appreciates its flavor; this flavor is, first and foremost, human, and it is as a human document that we must, we believe, approach its study and audition" (Note: Gavoty 1980, p. 221)—questioning "sincerity, which is an emotional element: is it a factor of intrinsic value?" However, while working on the score at the piano, he suddenly realizes "that in music, a certain nervous overexcitement is beneficial, and that one often succeeds in the heat of the moment what one fails to do when cold."

"Judged according to its merits and its avowed goal, Vierne's attempt to compose 'something powerful, grandiose, and strong' is perhaps not as absolute a success as—on a lesser level—the serene mastery of Reynaldo Hahn, who composed a 'radically different' Quintet for piano and strings in 1922, in a manner and material he received" from Marcel Proust’s close friend. "And perhaps the listener will not often feel ready to hear the anguish of the former as they would embrace the good company and absence of complication of the latter, closer to us in time and yet more conservative. Regardless, it is Vierne whose voice rises from the depths of a sadly too authentic experience."

The Quintet for Piano and Strings Op. 42 is unanimously recognized as Louis Vierne’s masterpiece in the realm of chamber music—"undoubtedly his absolute masterpiece", according to Harry Halbreich—revealing his art "in its most poignant form", according to Benoît Duteurtre. "And it is precisely one of Vierne's privileges to combine these two qualities: romantic in its passionate tone, classical in its clear structure, his music happily reconciles sensitivity and reason." The score, progressively becoming better known, "proves wrong the long-established reputation of French musicians 'not shining in the genre of quartets or quintets.'"

Jean-Pierre Mazeirat considers Vierne's Quintet in the history of music dedicated to this repertoire: "What a masterpiece! We are well acquainted with this long line of quintets where the greatest names in music distinguished themselves", from Luigi Boccherini, who pioneered writing for piano and string quartet, to Schubert, Schumann, Brahms, Dvořák, and in France, Franck, d'Indy, Koechlin, Florent Schmitt, Gabriel Dupont, and Gabriel Pierné, "not to mention the two masterpieces by Fauré. Vierne's Quintet not only matches them in beauty but surpasses them all in emotional power, even that of his teacher Franck, which is already so impressive."

=== Perspectives ===
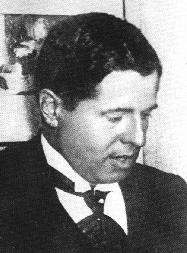
Albéric Magnard
(1865-1914)

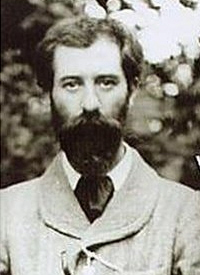
Charles Koechlin
(1867-1950)

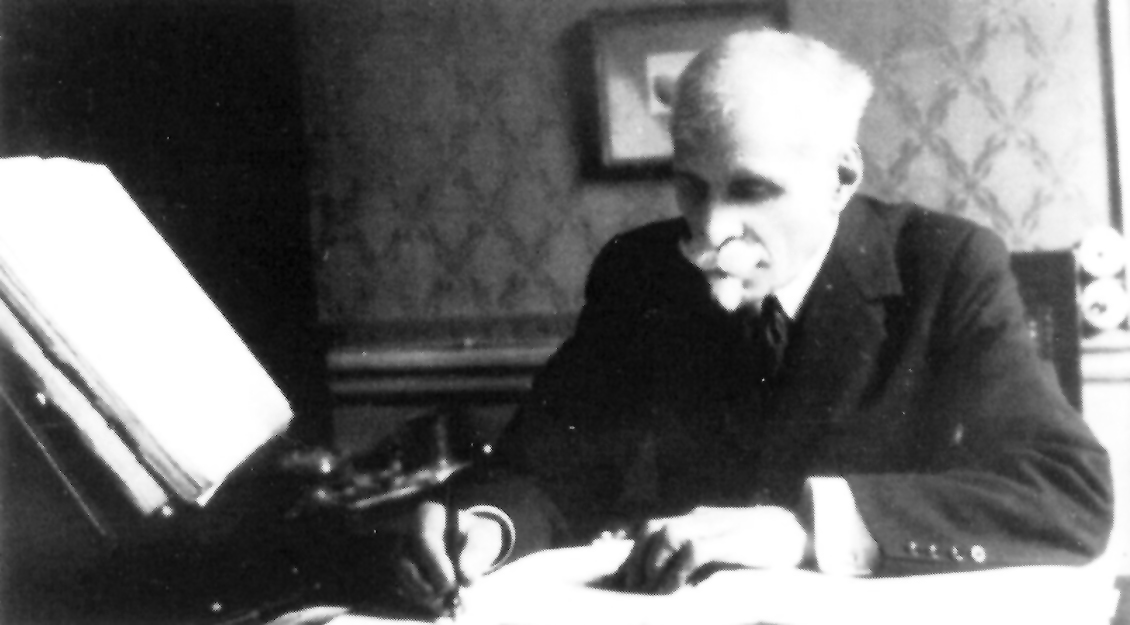
Maurice Emmanuel
(1862-1938)

Beyond the repertoire for quintet with piano, Vierne’s Opus 42 represents the "passionate expression of loss and mourning, and one of the most remarkable works composed in reaction to the slaughter of World War I" — the "horrible massacre of the Great War (great for whom?)" questions Philippe Simon.

Thus, the "final moderation" of the first movement, "like the previous outburst of emotion, suggests a parallel with the Second, Third, and Fourth Symphonies by Albéric Magnard, a contemporary of Vierne, born a few years before him" — and who died in Baron in the Oise in 1914, defending his property from the intrusion of German armies — a composer "whose chaotic, sometimes overwhelming outpourings often find relief in a conclusion marked by restraint close to apology: the underlying sudden emotion is all the more disturbing as it is thus austerely denied."

The discographic approach to the work allows it to be contrasted with other compositions that better highlight their own merits. In a series dedicated to "Musicians and the Great War" by the Hortus Éditions in 2015, Volume XVIII Ombres et Lumières offers "three austere pages of chamber music", associating Vierne's Quintet with works by Lucien Durosoir and Rudi Stephan — the result, "uniformly dark", is "not recommended for depressive souls", according to critic Bruno Peeters.

In 2014, the Gramola label contrasted Vierne's Quintet with his more intimate Préludes Op. 36 and Charles Koechlin's Sonata for Violin and Piano Op. 64, composed in 1916. François-René Tranchefort notes how this work is "serene, despite the era (World War I)." In Koechlin's own Quintet for Piano and Strings Op. 80, completed in 1921, the title of the second movement ("The Assault of the Enemy") refers to the battles, but the work concludes with a "majestic and exultant conclusion" in its Finale entitled "Joy." Rather than war and its carnage, "the backdrop is Nature, omnipresent in the composer's work and playing an essentially dynamic role: it is, for him, a source of serenity, joy, and regeneration."

Other parallels can be drawn: Harry Halbreich presents Maurice Emmanuel's First Symphony Op. 18, composed in 1919 in memory of a young aviator who died in battle, "as the serene antithesis to the tragic Quintet that Louis Vierne had just composed as an ex-voto in memory of his son, who had died in combat. The difference is clear: Vierne expresses not the feelings of the young soldier but his grief." Thus, the final measures of the symphony "Adagio of sublime serenity concluding in a soft light" offer an "epilogue of hope, tragically absent from Vierne's Quintet, which best underscores the difference between the two masterpieces."

== Discography ==
"Considering Vierne’s works in 1980", Bernard Gavoty marvels that "it has not aged a bit", (Note: Gavoty 1980, p. 321) even though "the melodies, chamber music, and piano pieces, as well as the orchestral scores, are less often performed" than the six Organ Symphonies, "which have overshadowed the rest of his work." "Is it any wonder, in an era when two glorious French musicians — Florent Schmitt, Arthur Honegger — along with many others, have nearly disappeared from programs?"

Gavoty mentions "a great number of French recordings of chamber music works — all out of print on vinyl records." Currently, Vierne's Quintet, "though not a hit, is very well known and well recorded on CD since the 1990s."

- Quintette pour piano et cordes, op. 42. Erato/Radio France 2292-45524-2. October 1983. OCLC 225654984. (Note: Upon its reissue, this disc was awarded "8" by Michel Philippot in Répertoire no. 31, December 1990, p. 86.) —with Sonata for violin and piano, op. 23.
- Vierne, Louis. La musique de chambre, enregistrement intégral — Quintette pour piano et cordes, op. 42 [Chamber music, complete recording – Quintet for piano and strings, op. 42]. by François Kerdoncuff (piano) and Phillips Quartet: Jean-Marc Phillips and Jérôme Marchand (violin), Odile Caracilly (viola) and Henri Demarquette (cello) ( September 17–20, 1993, 2 CD Timpani 2C2019) (OCLC 70597511);
- Quintette pour piano et cordes, op. 42 by Anna-Marie Globenski (piano) et Laval Quartet (1995, SNE Records 610-CD) (OCLC 38201534) — with Quintet for piano and strings No. 2, op. 68 by Charles-Marie Widor;
- Quintette pour piano et cordes, op. 42 by Chambre de Montréal Group: Jamie Parker (piano), Anne Robert et Marcelle Malette (violin), Nill Grip (viola) et Elizabeth Dolin (cella) (1995, CBC Records MVCD 1085) (OCLC 936607995) — with la Sonate pour violoncelle et piano, op. 27;
- Quintette pour piano et cordes, op. 42 by Gabriel Tacchino (piano) ahd Enesco Quartet (September 1999, Pierre Verany PV700011) (Note: Upon its release, this disc was awarded "8" by Philippe Simon in Répertoire no. 135, May 2000, p. 63, and "5 keys" in Diapason No. 469.) (OCLC 659191748) — with String quartet op. 12;
- Quintette pour piano et cordes, op. 42 by Stephen Coombs (piano) et le Chilingirian Quartet ( September 1–3, 2000, Hyperion Records CDA67258) (OCLC 873059225) read online — with Quintet for piano and strings by Reynaldo Hahn;
- Quintette pour piano et cordes, op. 42 by Stéphane Lemelin (piano) et Arthur-Leblanc Quartet: Hibiki Kobayashi et Brett Molzan (violin), Jean-Luc Plourde (viola) et Ryan Molzan (cello) (March 2006, coll. « Musique française Découvertes 1890–1939 » Atma ACD 22384) (OCLC 899741818) online — with Quintet for piano and strings, op. 41 by Gabriel Pierné;
- Quintette pour piano et cordes, op. 42 par Levente Kende (piano) and Spiegel Quartet ( December 10–12, 2007, MDG 644 1505-2) (Note: Upon its release, this disc was awarded "9" by Classica-Répertoire magazine.) (OCLC 717264816) — with String quartet op. 12;
- Quintette pour piano et cordes, op. 42 by Tamara Atschba (piano), Louise Chisson and Matthias Adensamer (violin), Alexander Znamensky (viola) and Christophe Pantillon (cello) (April 28 – May 3, 2014, Gramola GRAM99040) — with 12 Préludes, op. 36 and 12 Préludes, Sonata for violin and piano op. 64 de Charles Koechlin;
- Quintettes pour piano et cordes, by Bruno Rigutto (piano), Jean-Pierre Wallez and Yoé Miyazaki (violin), Bruno Pasquier (viola) and Henri Demarquette (cello) (December 15, 2014, 3 CD P&Y 2PYM01) — avec le with Piano Quintet by Franck, Sonata for violin and strings, op. 14 by Saint-Saëns and les Quintet for piano and strings No. 1, op. 7 et No. 2, op. 68 de Widor;
- Quintette pour piano et cordes, op. 42 by Vladimir Stoupel (piano), Judith Ingolfsson and Rebecca Li (violin), Stefan Fehlandt (viola) and Stephan Forck (cello) (April 2015, Accentus Music ACC303712) (OCLC 986504865);
- Quintette pour piano et cordes, op. 42 par Frédéric Lagarde (piano) and Ensemble Calliopée: Maud Lovett and Christophe Giovaninetti (violin), Karine Lethiec (viola), Florent Audibert (cello) (April 2015, coll. « Les Musiciens et la Grande Guerre », Éditions Hortus) (Note: Upon its release, this disc was awarded "5 keys" by François Laurent in Diapason magazine, May 2016.) (OCLC 974785217) — with compositions by Lucien Durosoir and Rudi Stephan;
- Quintette pour piano et cordes, op. 42 by Mūza Rubackytė (piano) et Terpsycordes Quartet ( December 14–16, 2015, Brilliant Classics 95367BR) — with Spleens et détresses, op. 38 ;
- Quintette pour piano et cordes, op. 42 by Catherine Montier (violin) and Christophe Gaugué (viola) and the Wanderer trio (July and September 2022, 2CD Harmonia Mundi HMM 902318.19, 2023) — with Quintet for piano and strings and Franck's Violin Sonata.

== Bibliography ==
=== Score ===
- Berend, P. A; Bibliothèque nationale de France (1997). "Œuvres instrumentales: Musique de chambre" [Instrumental works: Chamber music]. Bibliographie nationale française. Musique: Notices établies par la Bibliothèque nationale à partir des documents déposés auprès du Service du dépôt légal (in French). 186 (1). Paris: Bibliothèque nationale de France et Office général du livre: 73. ISSN 1142-3285.
- Vierne, Louis (1924). Quintette pour piano, deux violons, alto et violoncelle [Quintet for piano, two violins, viola and cello] (in French) (1st ed.). Paris: Sénart.
- Vierne, Louis (1993). Quintette pour 2 violons, alto, violoncelle et piano [Quintet for 2 violins, viola, cello and piano] (in French). Paris: Salabert. OCLC 34690110.
  - Hascher, Xavier (1992). Avant-propos et variantes [Foreword and variants] (in French and English). pp. 1–2.

=== General works ===
- Duteurtre, Benoît (1999). "Louis Vierne". Dictionnaire encyclopédique de la musique de chambre [Encyclopaedic dictionary of chamber music]. Bouquins (in French). Vol. II: K–Z. Paris: Robert Laffont. p. 1540. ISBN 2-2210-7848-9. OCLC 43700186.
- Goléa, Antoine (1977). La musique, de la nuit des temps aux aurores nouvelles [Music, from the dawn of time to the new dawn] (in French). Paris: Alphonse Leduc. ISBN 2-8568-9001-6.
- Honegger, Marc (1979). Dictionnaire de la musique: Les hommes et leurs œuvres [Dictionary of music: Men and their works]. Science de la Musique (in French). Bordas. p. 1153. ISBN 2-0401-0721-5. OCLC 79735642.
- Tranchefort, François-René (1987). Guide de la musique de chambre [Guide to chamber music]. Les Indispensables de la musique (in French). Paris: Fayard. ISBN 2-2130-2403-0. OCLC 21318922.
  - Vignal, Marc (1987). Luigi Boccherini. pp. 132–139.
  - Tranchefort, François-René. Gabriel Fauré. pp. 317–332.
  - De Place, Adélaïde (1987). César Franck. pp. 343–348.
  - Tranchefort, François-René. Charles Koechlin. pp. 506–510.
  - Ménétrier, Jean-Alexandre (1987). Gabriel Pierné. pp. 698–700.
  - Tranchefort, François-René. Florent Schmitt. pp. 773–778.
  - Halbreich, Harry (1987). Louis Vierne. pp. 914–916.
- Samazeuilh, Gustave (1947). Musiciens de mon temps: Chroniques et souvenirs [Musicians of my time: chronicles and memories] (in French). Paris: M[arcel] Daubin.
  - Samazeuilh (1939). Le souvenir de: Gabriel Pierné — Albert Roussel — Maurice Ravel [The memory of: Gabriel Pierné – Albert Roussel – Maurice Ravel]. pp. 198–207.
  - César Franck et ses élèves (à propos du cinquantenaire de sa mort) [César Franck and his pupils (on the fiftieth anniversary of his death)]. 1940. pp. 12–27.

=== Monographs ===
- Besingrand, Franck (2011). Louis Vierne. Horizons (in French). Paris: Bleu nuit. ISBN 978-2-3588-4018-7.
- Gavoty, Bernard (1980). Louis Vierne: la vie et l'œuvre [Louis Vierne: life and work]. Musique (in French). Paris: Buchet/Chastel. ISBN 978-2-3588-4018-7.
- Smith, Rollin (1999). Louis Vierne: Organist of Notre-Dame Cathedral. The Complete organ. Hillsdale (New Jersey): Pendragon Press. ISBN 978-1-5764-7004-6.

=== Journals ===
- Gramola (2014). "1914 : Louis Vierne / Charles Koechlin". www.gramola.at. Archived from the original on January 9, 2022.
- La Gazette musicale (2017). "Louis Vierne (1870–1937), Quintette pour piano et cordes, opus 42" [Louis Vierne (1870–1937), Quintet for piano and strings, Op. 42]. La Gazette musicale (in French). Archived from the original on May 19, 2022.
- Le Ménestrel (1921). "Festival Armande de Polignac-Louis Vierne" [Festival Armande de Polignac-Louis Vierne]. Le Ménestrel (in French): 264–265.
- La musique classique (2013). "Louis Vierne – Quintette pour piano et cordes" [Louis Vierne – Quintet for piano and strings]. www.lamusiqueclassique.com (in French). Archived from the original on September 28, 2021.
- André, Jean-Marie (November 7, 2015). "Le piano, la face cachée de l'organiste Louis Vierne" [The piano, the hidden face of organist Louis Vierne]. www.crescendo-magazine.be (in French). Archived from the original on January 9, 2022.
- Ameil, Cecil (June 6, 2003). "Bernard Lemmens et le Quatuor Stanislas: Œuvres de Beethoven, Bowen, Schumann et Vierne" [Bernard Lemmens and the Quatuor Stanislas: Works by Beethoven, Bowen, Schumann and Vierne]. www.anaclase.com (in French). Archived from the original on April 14, 2024.
- Bergnach, Laurent (2015). "Gabriel Pierné – Louis Vierne: Quintettes pour piano et cordes" [Gabriel Pierné – Louis Vierne: Quintets for piano and strings]. www.anaclase.com (in French). Archived from the original on July 19, 2024.
- Blazy, Maurice (1922). "À propos d'un concert récent" [About a recent concert]. Le Valentin Haüy: Revue française des questions relatives aux aveugles (in French): 61–62.
- Bolognesi, Bertrand (July 22, 2014). "Quatuor Ellipse, Marie-Catherine Girod et Antoine Pierlot: Œuvres de Joseph Boulnois, Gustave Samazeuilh et Louis Vierne" [Quatuor Ellipse, Marie-Catherine Girod and Antoine Pierlot: Works by Joseph Boulnois, Gustave Samazeuilh and Louis Vierne]. www.anaclase.com (in French). Archived from the original on June 24, 2024.
- Chahine, Loïc (November 2, 2016). "Quand la musique de chambre a des allures de poème" [When chamber music becomes a poem]. www.anaclase.com (in French). Archived from the original on July 17, 2024.
- Corbin, Michel (1985). "Franck, Pierné & Vierne, Quintettes pour piano et cordes" [Franck, Pierné & Vierne, Quintets for piano and strings]. Études (in French): 143.
- Galluhn, Konstantin (2011). "Vorwort, Louis Vierne Quintett in C-moll, op. 42" (PDF). Musikproduktion Höflich (in German and English). Munich. Archived from the original (PDF) on January 26, 2022.
- Novak, Mark (2016). "Critique CD Vierne USA". Fanfare. Archived from the original on January 27, 2018.
- Peeters, Bruno (November 2, 2016). "Les Musiciens et la Grande Guerre (8)" [Musicians and the Great War (8)]. www.crescendo-magazine.be (in French). Archived from the original on January 9, 2022.
- Ravel, Maurice (1995). "Esquisse autobiographique (1928)" [Autobiographical sketch (1928)]. Ravel. Solfèges (in French). Paris: Seuil. pp. 197–204. ISBN 2-0202-3490-4.
- Reboux, Paul (February 12, 1937). "Le talisman d'apaisement" [The calming talisman]. Paris-soir (in French).
- Simon, Philippe (2000). "Louis Vierne". Répertoire des disques compacts (in French) (135). Levallois-Perret: Éditions Répertoire. ISSN 1148-6244.
- Verdier, David (March 26, 2014). "Mélodies, préludes et quintette de Louis Vierne: par Anaïk Morel, le quatuor Daniel et Mūza Rubackytė" [Melodies, preludes and quintet by Louis Vierne: by Anaïk Morel, the Daniel Quartet and Mūza Rubackytė]. www.anaclase.com (in French). Archived from the original on March 1, 2024.

=== Notes on discography ===
- Brisson, Irène (2006). "Le Quintette en Do mineur de Vierne" [Vierne's Quintette in C minor]. Atma (ACD 22384) (in French and English). Paris: 6–7.
- Gallois, Jean (2014). "Cinq Quintettes avec piano de l'école française" [Five piano quintets from the French school]. P&Y (2Pym01) (in French). Paris: 2–9.
- Halbreich, Harry (2011). "De Beaune à Ys par la voie des airs" [From Beaune to Ys by air]. Timpani (1C1189) (in French and English). Paris: 4–8.
- Herlin, Denis (2023). "Franck, Vierne – Piano Trio & Quintets, Violin Sonata" [Franck, Vierne – Piano Trio & Quintets, Violin Sonata]. Harmonia Mundi (HMM 902318.19) (in French, English, and German). Paris: 3–4.
- Mazeirat, Jean-Pierre (1993). "Lumière et Ténèbres" [Light and Darkness]. Timpani (2C2019) (in French and English). Paris: 7–21.
- Mazeirat, Jean-Pierre (1995). "Louis Vierne et le piano" [Louis Vierne and the piano]. Timpani (2C2023) (in French and English). Paris: 6–17.
- Moncur, David (2016). "Vierne, Spleens et détresses & Piano Quintet". Brilliant Classics (95367BR). Paris: 2–5.
- De Place, Adélaïde (1995). "Louis Vierne, Quintette pour piano et cordes, op. 42 et Quatuor à cordes, op. 12" [Louis Vierne, Quintet for piano and strings, op. 42 and String Quartet, op. 12]. Pierre Verany (PV700011) (in French and English). Paris: 3–6.
- Pott, Francis (2001). "Hahn & Vierne Piano Quintets" [Hahn & Vierne Piano Quintets]. Hypérion (CDA67258) (in French and English). Paris: 10–18.
