= Jean Gallois =

Jean Gallois may refer to:

- Jean Gallois (abbot) (1632–1707), French scholar and abbé
- Jean Gallois (musicologist) (1929–2022), pseudonym of Jean Gaillard, French musicologist
