= Vierne =

Vierne is a surname. Notable people with the surname include:

- Jean-Jacques Vierne (1921–2003), French film director
- Louis Vierne (1870–1937), French organist and composer
- René Vierne (1878–1918), French organist and composer, brother of Louis
