= René Vierne =

French composer

René Ambroise Jean Eugéne Vierne (11 March 1878 – 29 May 1918) was a French organist and composer. He was the younger brother of Louis Vierne, who was also a composer.

== Biography ==
René Vierne was born in Lille, the younger brother of Louis Vierne. Pushed by his mother, he entered the Catholic Seminary at Versailles in 1889 where he studied music with the Canon Poivet. Not feeling a vocation to the priesthood, he left and instead devoted himself to music, taking lessons in organ, counterpoint and fugue with his brother Louis. Then he studied with Alexandre Guilmant at the Paris Conservatoire, and was awarded a first prize for organ and improvisation in 1906.

In 1897, Vierne obtained a post as organist at the Chapel of the Convent of the Dominicans, the Annunciation, rue du Faubourg Saint-Honoré in Paris. In 1904, he succeeded Camille Andres (1864–1904) as titular organist at Notre-Dame-des-Champs.

At the outbreak of World War I, René Vierne was mobilised and moved to the front on 8 August 1914. On 29 May 1918, at 8 am, on the Plateau Branscourt (Marne), he was killed by Austrian shrapnel. (This loss severely affected his brother, who also lost his son Jacques in the war.)
