= Jean Gallois (musicologist) =

French musicologist (1929–2022)

- Born: Jean Gaillard; 30 March 1929; Nevers, France
- Died: 4 October 2022 (aged 93); Issy-les-Moulineaux, France
- Occupations: Musicologist, violinist

Jean Gallois, pseudonym of Jean Gaillard (French: [ʒɑ̃ ɡalwɑ]; 30 March 1929 – 4 October 2022), was a French musicologist, violinist, music historian, and music critic.

== Biography ==
Gallois published numerous books on Baroque music, Romantic music, and music from the 19th and 20th centuries. He became close with composer Maurice Delage in 1948 and compiled a catalog of his works. His biography of Ernest Chausson earned him the Grand Prix Bernier from the Académie des Beaux-Arts. His book, Les Polignac, mécènes du xxe siècle, was honored by the Institut social de France et de l'Union européenne.

Gallois created the collection Horizons with Bleu nuit, which he directed until 2008. He was also a member of the Académie Charles Cros and the scientific committee of the Musée Eugène Carrière.

Jean Gallois died on 4 October 2022 at the age of 93 in Issy-les-Moulineaux.

== Discography ==
- "Ernest Chausson, Le Roi Arthus" (1987)
- "Maurice Delage" (1998)
- "Cinq Quintettes avec piano de l'école française" (2014)

== Publications ==
- Jean-Sébastien Bach (1961)
- Richard Wagner (1962)
- César Franck (1966)
- Ernest Chausson (1967)
- Antonio Vivaldi (1967)
- Anton Bruckner (1971)
- Robert Schumann (1972)
- Georg Friedrich Haendel (1980)
- César Franck (1980)
- Ernest Chausson (1994)
- Les Polignac, mécènes du xxe siècle (1995)
- Les grands musiciens (1997)
- Ernest Chausson : écrits inédits, journaux intimes, roman de jeunesse, correspondance (1999)
- Jean-Baptiste Lully ou la naissance de la tragédie lyrique (2001)
- Henri Collet ou l'Espagne impérieuse (2001)
- Camille Saint-Saëns (2004)
- Anton Bruckner (2014)
- Igor Stravinski (2016)
- Georg Friedrich Haendel (2019)
- Robert Schumann (2020)
