= Maîtres contemporains de l'orgue =

1912 collection of books on organ music

Maîtres contemporains de l'orgue is an eight-volume collection of books edited by abbot Joseph Joubert and published by Éditions Maurice Senart from 1912. These books provide a selection of organ music pieces previously unpublished and composed by various contemporary composers from the end of the 19th century and beginning of the 20th century. The first six volumes are "for organ or harmonium", so the pieces in them do not include a mandatory pedal part. According to the preface of the books, the collection was meant to be a "veritable encyclopædia of modern writing for the organ".

== Preface ==
L'Anthologie des Maîtres Contemporains de l'Orgue offers church musicians and all lovers of good music a careful selection of pieces that have not so far been published elsewhere. These pieces represent all styles and schools of composition, and have been drawn from all countries. They are in general not too demanding, and can be performed on a standard harmonium just as well as on the most elaborate instrument.

The Anthology is thus a veritable encyclopædia of modern writing for the organ, gaining an exceptional interest from offering a wide range of styles and from its international character.

I am delighted to take this occasion of publicly acknowledging the gratitude I owe to the many and illustrious composers who, in response to my modest request for help, chose to write pieces specially for this Collection. It is this range of remarkable compositions that makes the Anthology worthy of a special place in the library of any organist.

It is with particular pleasure that I can offer my gratitude and respect to mm. Ch.-M. Widor, F. de la Tombelle and Alphonse Mailly, who have graciously allowed me to dedicate a volume to each of them. Patronage at this level seems to me already a guarantee of success, and also the most authoritative possible confirmation of the value of the pieces included in the Anthology.

While I was preparing this publication, m. Henry Eymieu was unstintingly generous with advice born of experience and with kindly encouragement; he also contributed to the biographical notes, giving them a personal and critical touch I much appreciate. I hope he may be pleased to accept my warmest thanks for his contribution!

Though most of the composers represented in the Anthology are already well-known, it seemed to me useful to provide a few lines of biographical and bibliographical information for each of them. If these lines are unavoidably brief and incomplete, the pieces which these Modern Masters of the Organ have contributed will speak for their composers.

Solemnity of liturgy and dignified church music! These matters are rightly, and all the more so since the publication of the motu proprio from His Holiness Pius X, of great concern to all who have received the noble task of praising the name of the Lord and of helping others do so. May this work I have undertaken for the sake of Religion and of Art add yet more to the splendour and beauty of our liturgical celebrations!

Such is the desire of the Author: to see this desire realised would be the best possible reward for my modest labours!

l'abbé Jos. Joubert

— Preface to Volume I, translation by Niels Grundtvig Nielsen

== Composers in École française, volume I ==
- Andlauer, Louis
- Barié, Augustin
- Bazelaire, Paul
- Bentz, Jules
- Blin, René
- Bonnal, Ermend Joseph
- Boucher, Roger
- Boulanger, Nadia
- Boulnois, Joseph
- Canton, Léon
- Cellier, Alexandre Eugène
- Colinet, Arthur
- Collin, Charles
- Collin, Charles Augustin
- Combes, Paul
- Courtonne, Marcel
- Dallier, Henri
- Darros, Noël
- Debat-Ponson, Georges
- Decq, Adhémar
- Delune, Louis
- Delvincourt, Claude
- Dodement, Arthur
- Doney, Camille
- Dumas, Louis
- Dupré, Marcel
- Eymieu, Henry
- Fauchey, Paul
- Fleuret, Daniel
- Ganaye, Jean-Baptiste
- Garbet, Gabriel
- Gastoué, Amédée
- George, Max
- Gigout, Eugène
- Gouard, Henri
- Grigi, Constant Raoul
- Grosjean, Ernest
- Guilmant, Alexandre
- Guiraud, Georges
- Huré, Jean
- Indy, Vincent d'
- Jacob, Georges
- Jacquemin, Louis
- Jemain, Joseph
- Kunc, Aloys
- Lacroix, Eugène
- Landais, Eugène

== Composers in École française, volume II ==
- Lefebvre, Charles
- Le Guennant, Auguste
- Letocart, Henri
- Libert, Henri
- Marichelle, Alfred
- Marty, Adolphe
- Massenet, Jules
- Messerer, Henri
- Mulet, Henri
- Nibelle, Henri
- Paraire, Saturnin
- Perruchot, Louis-Lazare
- Pessard, Émile
- Philip, Achille
- Pierné, Paul
- Pineau, Charles
- Planchet, Dominique-Charles
- Pollet, Charles-Marie
- Potiron, Henri
- Prestat, Marie
- Quef, Charles
- Raffat de Bailhac, Amédée-Marie
- Marc de RanseRanse, Marc de
- Émile RatezRatez, Émile
- Raugel, Félix Alphonse
- Renard, Georges-François
- Renaud, Albert
- Renoux, André
- Reuchsel, Amédée
- Reuchsel, Léon
- Reuchsel, Maurice
- Rouher, Marcel
- Rozan, Blanche
- Saint-Réquier, Léon de
- Schmitt, Alphonse
- Schmitt, Florent
- Selva, Blanche
- Sérieyx, Auguste
- Vadon, Jean
- Vallombrosa, Amédée de
- Vidal, Paul
- Vierne, Louis
- Vierne, René
- Vivet, Armand
- Walter, Désiré
