= Marc de Ranse =

- Born: 20 April 1881; Château de Ranse, Aiguillon in Aquitaine
- Died: 12 February 1951 (aged 69); Agen
- Education: Conservatoire de Paris
- Occupations: Organist; Pianist; Composer; Choral conductor; Music educator
- Awards: Chevalier de la Légion d'honneur

François-Marie Dieudonné Marc, Baron de Ranse (20 April 1881 – 12 February 1951) was a French pianist, organist, maître de chapelle, choral conductor and composer.

== Biographie ==
Born in Aiguillon in Aquitaine, Ranse was a student of Vincent d'Indy at the Schola Cantorum de Paris. His artistic vocation began at the Collège Saint-Caprais of Agen, where he met Joseph Schluty (1829-1920), organist at the Saint-Caprais Agen Cathedral.

In 1897, Ranse left for Paris to study music. He was a student for nearly ten years (1897-1907) at the Schola Cantorum with an interruption between 1902 and 1905 due to military service). Among his professors were Vincent d'Indy (music composition), Léon de Saint-Réquier then Fernand de La Tombelle (harmony), Albert Roussel (counterpoint), Gabriel Grovlez (piano), Charles Bordes (vocal ensemble), Abel Decaux (organ (1st degree), Alexandre Guilmant (orgue supérieur), Amédée Gastoué (Gregorian studies).

After his musical training, he began a career as a church musician. He composed pieces for organ and harmonium. He was co-founder with Joseph Boulnois of the Spiritual Concerts of Saint-Louis d'Antin.

During the First World War, he joined the front. He was wounded and taken prisoner in Belgium. Sick during his captivity, the Germans sent him to Switzerland, in 1916, in the region of Montreux for treatment. He then became the conductor of the Allied internees' symphony orchestra.

Back in Paris in 1919, he returned to the Parisian churches as an organist. He then directed the Gregorian Institute of Paris from 1929 to 1933. On May 25, 1929, he participated in the reception of the new organ of the église du Val-de-Grâce with Achille Philip, titular, André Marchal and Jean Huré.

He never stopped composing numerous works, touching all musical registers: piano solo and piano with 4 hands, incidental music, harmonium and organ without pedal, grand orgue, chamber music, symphonic music, orchestration works and vocal music.

In 1921, he became choral conductor and founded the Chœur Mixte de Paris, a professional choir lending its support to the concert activity of the major associations of symphonic music of the capitale (Concerts du Conservatoire, Concerts Lamoureux, Concerts Pasdeloup).

In 1927, with the help of Gustave Daumas, Carlo Boller and Paul Doncœur, he published the first version of Roland's collection of popular songs.

In 1933, Ranse decided for both professional and personal reasons, to leave Paris to return for good to his hometown of Aiguillon. He had inherited the title of Baron at the death of his father in 1924 and was made chevalier of the Legion of Honour in 1934.

Marc de Ranse died in Agen on 12 February 1951.
