= Paul Fauchet =

French composer and organist (1881–1937)

Paul Robert Marcel Fauchet (27 June 1881 – 12 November 1937) was a French composer and organist.

== Life ==
Born in Paris, the son of the organist of the same name, he studied at the Conservatoire de Paris with Alexandre Guilmant and Paul Vidal and won first prizes in counterpoint and fugue, piano accompaniment and harmony. He worked as a coach in the class of Louis Vierne, who dedicated the song from the Vingt-quatre pièces en style libre to him and was organist at the Église Saint-Pierre-de-Chaillot. From 1927, he taught harmony at the Conservatoire. Among his students were Jacques de La Presle, Georges Taconet and Lucien Caillet

Fauchet composed a symphonic piece for organ and orchestra, a solennelle mass for four-part choir and orchestra, a mass for three-part choir and string quartet, Ecce sacerdos magnus for soloists, choir and orchestra, motets and other choral works as well as songs. His symphony for Concert band is still in the repertoire of wind orchestras today.

Paul Fauchet died in Paris on 12 November 1937 at the age of 56.

== Works ==
=== Work for orchestra ===
- Pièce symphoníque, for organ and orchestra

=== Works for harmony orchestra ===
- 1926 Symphonie en si bemol pour orchestre d'harmonie
  1. Ouverture: Maestoso - Allegro Deciso
  2. Nocturne: Lento
  3. Scherzo: Vivo, Giocoso, Molto Leggiero
  4. Finale: Allegro Vivace

=== Masses and other church music ===
- Ecce Sacerdos Magnus, for soloists, mixed choir and orchestra
- Messe solennelle, for mixed choir and orchestra
- Messe, for three-voice mixed choir and string quartet

=== Chamber music ===
- Larghetto, for cello and organ

=== Works for organ ===
- Quatre esquisses
  1. Cantilène en sol majeur
  2. Eglogue en sol majeur
  3. Méditation en sol majeur
  4. Scherzetto en sol mineur
- Choral en si mineur (1914)

== Publications ==
- Cinquante leçons d'harmonie, Paris: Éditions E. Gaudet
- Quarante leçons d'harmonie, 2 vols, Paris: Éditions Salabert and Éditions E. Gaudet,

== Bibliography ==
- Constant Pierre: Le Conservatoire national de musique et de déclamation. Imprimerie nationale, Paris, 1900.
- Paul E. Bierley, William H. Rehrig: The heritage encyclopedia of band music: composers and their music. Integrity Press, Westerville, Ohio, 1991, ISBN 0918048 087
- Wolfgang Suppan, Armin Suppan: Das Neue Lexikon des Blasmusikwesens. Blasmusikverlag Schulz, Freiburg-Tiengen, 4th impression, 1994, ISBN 3923058071
- Rollin Smith: Louis Vierne: organist of Notre-Dame Cathedral, Pendragon Press, 1999. 805 p., ISBN 9781576470046
- Francis Pieters: Les symphonies pour orchestre d'harmonie de Paul Fauchet et James Robert Gillette. In: CMF Journal Nº-530, June 2007.
- Shannon Kitelinger: Paul Fauchet’s Symphony in B-flat. Dissertation, University of North Texas, [ ? ].
