= Vingt-quatre pièces en style libre =

- Organ music by Louis Vierne
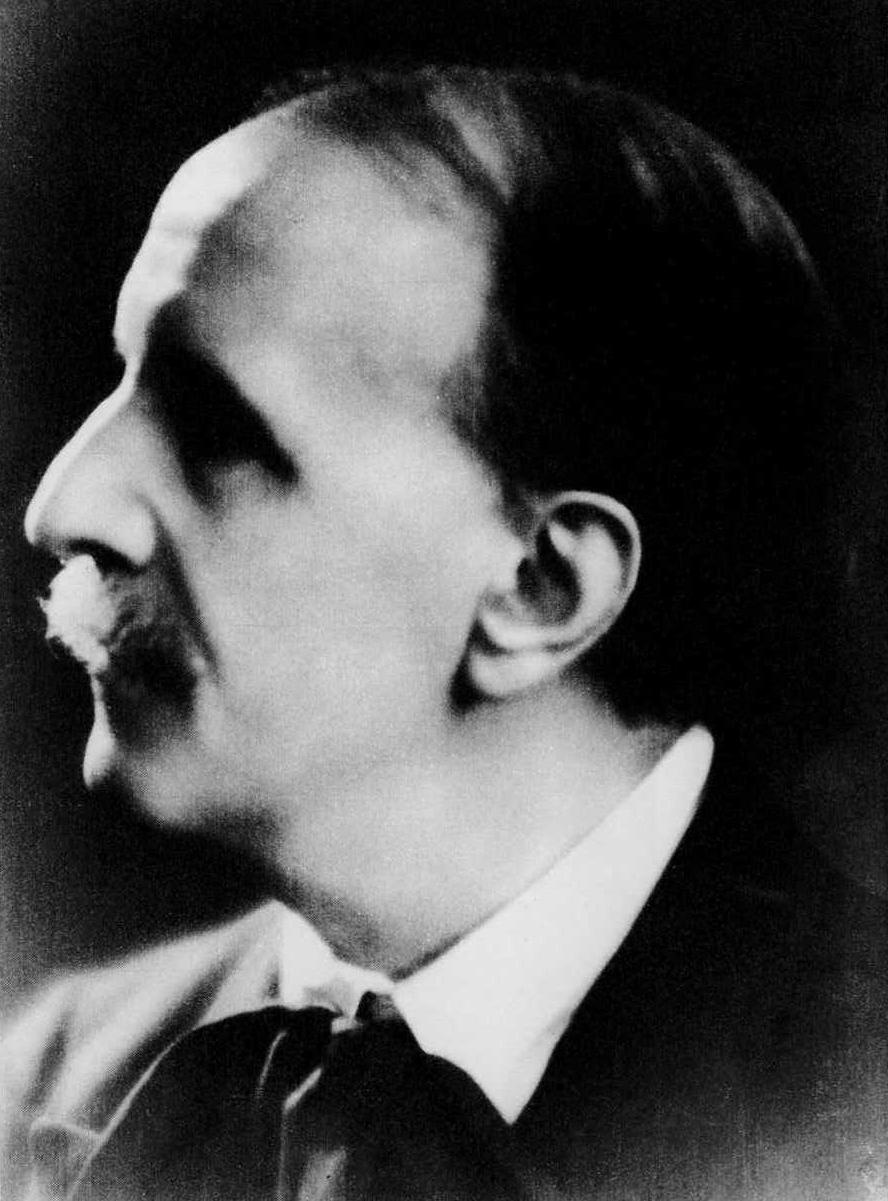
- The composer in 1910
- Opus: 31
- Composed: 1913–14
- Published: 1914
- Movements: 24
- Scoring: organ or harmonium

Vingt-quatre pièces en style libre (24 pieces in free style), Op. 31, by Louis Vierne for organ or harmonium were written in two volumes during the years 1913 and 1914.

== Presentation ==
It is a collection of pieces for organ or harmonium, of medium level (intermediate), with an indication by the author of registrations and nuances. Vierne wrote in the Durand edition:

The parts of this collection are calculated in such a way that they can be executed during the normal duration of an Offertory. They are registered for a harmonium of 4.5 stops and for an organ with two keyboards and 18 to 20 stops pedal.

It goes without saying that registration is, here, a general indication of colour and that this registration can be modified according to the instruments available to artists.

Two immediately adjacent initials (G. R.) indicate that the grand organ is coupled to the récit, or swell; the initial G. indicates that this keyboard is separated from the swell. Same observation for the initials placed next to the name Ped. They indicate with which keyboard the pedal is coupled.

All pieces in this collection can be played entirely with the hands: when they are performed on a pedal organ, it will be good to divide in the hands the passages under which the pedal is used.

These pieces follow the same pattern of keys that Johann Sebastian Bach used for his two volumes of The Well-Tempered Clavier.

== Details of the collections ==
Book I (1913)

1. Préambule – C major
2. Cortège – C minor
3. Complainte – D♭ major
4. Épitaphe – C♯ minor
5. Prélude – D major
6. Canon – D minor
7. Méditation – E♭ maor
8. Idylle mélancolique – E♭ major
9. Madrigal – E major
10. Rêverie – E minor
11. Divertissement – F major
12. Canzona – F minor

Book II (1914)

1. Légende – F♯ major (to Maurice Blazy.)
2. Scherzetto – F♯ minor (to Alexandre Eugène Cellier)
3. Arabesque – G major (to Émile Bourdon)
4. Choral – G minor (to Joseph Boulnois)
5. Lied – A♭ major (to Paul Fauchet)
6. Marche funèbre – G♯ minor (in memory of my friend Jules Bouval)
7. Berceuse – A major on classical lyrics (to my daughter Colette)
8. Pastorale – A minor (to Roger Boucher)
9. Carillon – B♭ major on the chime ringing of the Carillon in the chapel of the Château de Longpont (Aisne); (to my brother René Vierne)
10. Élégie – B♭ minor (to Georges Kriéger.)
11. Épithalame – B major (to André Renoux)
12. Postlude – B minor (to Émile Poillot)
