= Boulnois =

Boulnois is a French surname which may refer to:

- Alfred Boulnois, French cyclist who competed in the 1900 Summer Olympics
- Edmund Boulnois (1838–1911), British businessman and politician
- Joseph Boulnois (1884–1918), French composer and organist
- Michel Boulnois (1907–2008), French composer and organist
- Luce Boulnois (1931–2009), French historian
