= Roger Boucher =

French organist and composer

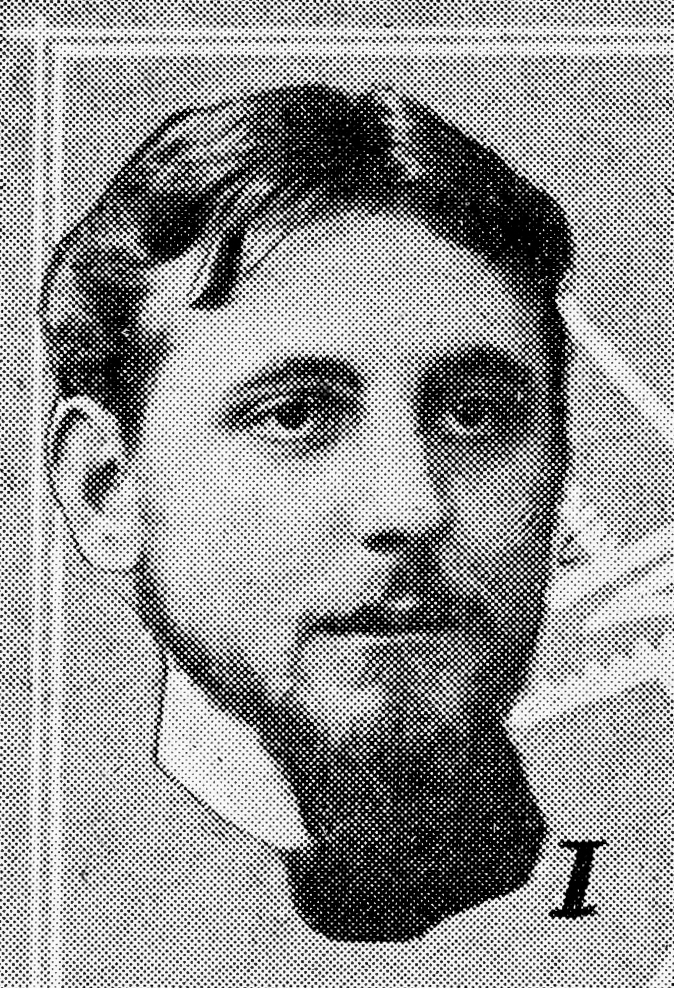
- Roger Boucher in the Comœdia Illustré magazine in 1910
- Born: 13 January 1885; Le Neubourg, France
- Died: 20 October 1918 (aged 33); Paris, France
- Education: Conservatoire de Paris
- Occupations: Classical organist; Composer
- Awards: Mort pour la France

Roger Boucher (13 January 1885 – 20 October 1918) was a French organist and composer.

== Biography ==
Entered at the Conservatoire de Paris in 1901, Roger Boucher won a 2nd prize in harmony (class of Émile Pessard) in 1906, a 1st prize in piano accompaniment (class of Paul Vidal) in 1907, 1st prize of counterpoint (class of André Gedalge) in 1909, 1st prize in music composition in 1909, 1st prize in organ (class of Alexandre Guilmant) in 1910, and 1st prize in fugue (class of Charles-Marie Widor) in 1910.

Roger Boucher was successively organist at Église Saint-Eugène-Sainte-Cécile, Saint-Ferdinand-des-Ternes Church, in Argenteuil basilica, then titular of the grand organ of the Saint-Thomas-d'Aquin in Paris church, from 1910 to his death.

He died as a result of war injuries at the Val-de-Grâce military hospital.

Louis Vierne dedicated to him the Pastorale of the second book of the Vingt-quatre pièces en style libre for organ Op. 31.

== Scores ==
- Free scores by Roger Boucher at the International Music Score Library Project (IMSLP): Cantabile in A-flat major for organ or harmonium, in Joseph Joubert, Maîtres contemporains de l'orgue, vol. 1 (1912).

== Bibliography ==
- Biographical notes in Maîtres contemporains de l'orgue (second volume), Joseph Joubert, 1912.
- Rollin Smith. Louis Vierne: organist of Notre-Dame Cathedral, Pendragon Press, 1999, ISBN 1-57647-004-0, p. 188 .
