= Georges Jacob (organist) =

French organist, improviser and composer (1877–1950)

Georges (Armand Paul) Jacob
- Born: 19 August 1877
- Origin: France
- Died: 28 December 1950 (aged 73)
- Occupations: Organist, Improviser and Composer

Georges (Armand Paul) Jacob (19 August 1877 – 28 December 1950) was a French organist, improviser and composer.

== Biography ==
Born in Paris, Georges Paul made his first musical studies at the École Niedermeyer de Paris. After he joined the Conservatoire de Paris in 1896, he won a First prize in organ in 1900, in Alexandre Guilmant's class. From 1892 to 1912, G. Jacob gave organ recitals, which were very well attended at the Schola Cantorum de Paris. His aim was to bring out the best of both ancient and modern works of organ literature.

As a composer, he has already written and published many works. In addition, he began publishing, with an explanatory commentary, the great works for organ of J.-S. Bach.

From 1902 to 1914, he was a piano teacher at the Schola Cantorum. Organist and Kapellmeister of Église Notre-Dame-de-la-Gare de Paris from 1897 to 1903, organist of the great organ of the Église Saint-Louis-d'Antin from 1903 to 1906, he then held the position of organist and Kapellmeister of the Église Saint-Ferdinand-des-Ternes, from 1907 to his death in 1950.

In 1922, he succeeded Joseph Bonnet as organist of the Orchestre de la Société des Concerts du Conservatoire.

Georges Jacob died in Paris on 28 December 1950 and was buried in the Père Lachaise Cemetery (2nd division).

== Compositions ==
=== Works for organ ===
- 1906: Prélude Funèbre et Variation
- 1907: Symphonie pour grand orgue in E minor (Leduc): I. Prélude funèbre, Fugue, Variation II. Andante III. Scherzo IV. Final.
- 1909: Quatre Morceaux for organ (Kistner, Leipzig): 1. Invocation 2. Noël 3. Au cloître 4. Dans la lande.
- 1909: Douze Pièces pour Grand-orgue (Leduc) : 1. Pastorale (in E flat) 2. Offertoire pour Mariage 3. Noël Bourguignon 4. Invocation 5. Duetto 6. Canzonetta 7. Prélude Funèbre 8. Carillon 9. Magnificat (in F) 10. Alleluia 11. Andantino 12. Sortie.
- 1909: Pastorale "Les Heures Bourguignonnes", collection of 12 pieces from 12 scenes by Maurice Léna (Leduc): 1. Lever de soleil 2. Le réveil 3. Le départ du troupeau 4. Vendanges 5. La chanson du berger 6. Midi 7. La pluie 8. Sous le noyer 9. En revenant des vignes 10. Chanson de pressoir 11. La ronde 12. Tombée du soir.
- 1911: Entrée de Mariage
- 1911: 1re Suite religieuse (Schirmer): 1. Laudes 2. Resurrexi (Introït du jour de Pâques) 3. Méditation 4. Au Prieuré 5. Bénédiction.
- 1911: 2e Suite religieuse (Schirmer): 1. Invocation 2. Angelus 3. Souvenir grégorien 4. Communion 5. Prière du soir.
- 1916: Impressions dominicales (Schirmer): 1. Veni Creator 2. Recueillement 3. Bergerade mélancolique 4. Hélas ! 5. Souffrance, Trouble, Triomphe.
- Exercices pour grand orgue (ou piano pédalier) (United Music Publishers).
- Livre d’orgue (Éditions Ouvrières): 1. Invention 2. Pastorale 3. Canon 4. Louange de l’oiseau 5. Choral 6. Mouvement.

=== Works for harmonium ===
- 1909: 25 Pièces pour harmonium (Leduc).
- 1911: Choral varié; Prise de voile; Andante in D major, in Parnasse des Organistes du XXe, vol. 1, Paris
- 1911: 14 Pièces pour harmonium (Loret).
- Andantino in E flat major, in Joseph Joubert, Maîtres contemporains de l'orgue, vol. 1, Paris, 1912.
- Pastorale in F-sharp minor (transcription for harmonium by the author), in J. Joubert, Maîtres contemporains de l'orgue, vol. 1, Paris, 1912.

=== Works for piano ===
- Nocturne, Légende et Scherzo.

=== Other compositions ===
Several melodies and hymns.

== Sources ==
- Joseph Joubert, Anthology Maîtres contemporains de l'orgue, vol. 1, Paris, Sénart, 1912.
- Pierre Guillot, Dictionnaire des organistes français des XIXe et XXe siècles, Brussel, Mardaga, 2003.
