= Pierre Kunc =

French composer and organist

Pierre Kunc (28 October 1865 – 29 December 1941) was a French composer and organist.

== Life ==
Kunc was born in Toulouse, the son of Aloys Kunc and brother of Aymé Kunc. After literary studies in his hometown, Kunc entered the École Niedermeyer de Paris in 1889. There he studied organ with Clément Loret and piano with Charles Wilfrid de Bériot and was awarded organ, harmony, fugue and composition prizes. In the fall of 1890, he continued his training at the Conservatoire de Paris in the classes of Eugène Gigout (organ) and Ernest Guiraud (composition).

== Work ==
- 12 Pièces sur des noëls français for pipe organ
- Prélude grave « à la manière de Hændel » in J. Joubert, Maîtres contemporains de l'orgue, vol. 1, Paris (1912)
- Offertoire en fa majeur, Offertoire sur deux noëls in B flat major, Marche pour Sortie in D major, for organ or harmonium, in Parnasse des organistes du XXe siècle, Arras (1911)
- Symphonie pyrénéenne for orchestra (1911)
- Sonate pour alto et piano (or orchestra) (1919-21)
- Symphonie en ré mineur for organ (1921-1923)
- Vingt Prières de l'orgue (1925)
- Messe en l'honneur de Sainte Bernadette Soubirous for 4-part mixed choir and organ (1935)
- Messe Solennelle en l'honneur des Saintes Reliques for mixed choir and organ (1925-1938)
- Rapsodie pour alto et piano, Fêtes - Recueillement - Danses (1939)
