= Guiraud (disambiguation) =

Guiraud (1070–1123) was a French bishop of Béziers.

Guiraud may also refer to:

- Alexandre Guiraud (1788–1847), French poet and author
- David Guiraud (born 1992), French politician
- Ernest Guiraud (1837–1892), French composer
- Georges Guiraud (1868–1928), French composer and organist
- Jean Guiraud (1866–1953), French historian and journalist
- Marie Guiraud (1832–1909), French-American rancher, farmer, and land developer
- Marie Rose Guiraud (1944–2020), Ivorian dancer and choreographer
- Paul Guiraud (1850–1907), French historian

== See also ==
- Château Guiraud, a French wine
- Saint-Guiraud, a commune in the Hérault department, France
- Guiraudo lo Ros (c. 12th century), Occitan troubador from Toulouse
