= Louis Andlauer =

French composer and organist

Louis Andlauer (7 September 1876 – 18 July 1915) was a French composer and organist.

== Biography ==
Born in Honfleur, the son of Auguste Andlauer, (pupil of Jacques-Nicolas Lemmens, and organist at Notre-Dame-des-Champs,) Louis Andlauer won a First prize of organ in the classes of Alexandre Guilmant and Charles-Marie Widor in 1901. Louis Andlauer wrote organ and harmonium pieces, three masses, a cantata, religious motets and several songs.

Organist and director of music at the Parisian church of Saint-Éloi, he was also a substitute for Louis Vierne from 1912 to 1914 at the organ of Notre-Dame de Paris. During the Great War he became a sergeant in the 28th Régiment d'infanterie territoriale, and was killed at the front line on 18 July 1915 at Marœuil (Pas-de-Calais).

== Bibliography ==
- (in French) Biographical notes in Joseph Joubert, Maîtres contemporains de l'orgue, Paris, Senart, 1912, vol. 1, (p. 1)
