= Jules Bentz =

Jules Bentz (13 May 1873 – 14 October 1962) was a French composer, organist and Kapellmeister.

== Biography ==
Jules Bentz was born in Merxheim in Alsace during the German annexation. He began his musical studies at the Conservatoire de Strasbourg and completed them at the École Niedermeyer under the direction of Gustave Lefèvre, A. Georges, Ch. de Bériot, P. Viardot and Clément Loret.

After two years as a choir organist at Notre-Dame de Clignancourt, he later became organist and Kapellmeister at the église Sainte-Geneviève in Asnières.

Bentz wrote a very large number of motets and pieces for piano, organ, violin and orchestra.

Jules Bentz died in Asnières on 14 October 1962.

== Bibliography ==
- Biographical notes in Maîtres contemporains de l'orgue, Joseph Joubert, 1911.
