= Andlauer =

Andlauer is a surname. Notable people with the surname include:

- Édouard Ignace Andlauer (1830–1909), French composer and organist
- Julien Andlauer (born 1999), French racing driver
- Louis Andlauer (1876 –1915), French composer and organist
- Michael Andlauer (born 1966), Canadian businessman and ice hockey club owner
