= Fourteen Songs =

Fourteen Songs or 14 Songs may refer to:

- Fourteen Songs, a sonata by Georges Taconet
- 14 Songs, an album by Paul Westerberg

== See also ==
- Reroute to Remain, subtitled: Fourteen Songs of Conscious Insanity, an album by In Flames
- Eight Songs for Greg Sage and the Wipers, album rereleased as Fourteen Songs for Greg Sage and the Wipers
