= Achille Philip =

French organist and composer

Paul Camille Casimir Achille Philip (12 October 1878 - 12 November 1959) was a French organist, composer, conductor and pedagogue. A prolific performer, he occupied numerous posts as titular organist at various important churches throughout France, and taught at the Schola Cantorum in Paris. Philip also co-founded the Quatuor français along with his first wife, Marthe Legrand.

== Biography ==
Born in Arles, Provence on 12 October 1878, Philip entered the Conservatory of Marseille at the age of nine. There, he won first prizes for solfeggio in 1894, piano in 1896, and harmony in 1898. In October 1898, he entered the Conservatory of Paris to study organ with Alexandre Guilmant and composition with Charles Lenepveu. Philip won first prize in counterpoint and fugue in 1904.

From 1904 to 1913 Philip served as organist of the choir organ at La Madeleine in Paris. From 1904 to 1950 he was professor of organ and harmony at the Schola Cantorum.

Philip also held the position of titular organist at the following churches:

- Saint-Jacques-du-Haut-Pas (1913-1928);
- Saint-Léon (1928-1949);
- Saint-François-Xavier (1941-1946, from thereon succeeded by Gaston Litaize);
- Val-de-Grâce (1913-1950)

At Val-de-Grâce, Philip would conduct Johann Sebastian Bach's St. John and St. Matthew Passions in special concerts once a year. He would also conduct Wolfgang Amadeus Mozart's Requiem at All Souls' Day services.

Philip premièred his opera Bacchus at the Théâtre des Arenes in Béziers on 3 August 1935. He soon moved permanently to Béziers, where he would be appointed titular organist of the Basilica of Saint Aphrodisius on 31 March 1957. He would hold this position until his death in the same city on 12 November 1959.

Philip was married to the singer Marthe Legrand, with whom he founded the "Quatuor français". Following her death, he married Louise Gant.

== Selected compositions ==
=== Keyboard ===
==== Organ ====
- Prelude and Fugue (1902)
- Adagio and Fugue (1904)
- Lied (1911)
- Piece in B minor (1911, published in Maîtres contemporains de l'orgue)
- Toccata and Fugue in A minor (1913, Durand).
- Variations sur le noël « Il est né le divin enfant »
- Cinq petites pièces faciles sur des noëls provençaux
- Postlude : Carillons

==== Piano ====
- Dans la forêt au crépuscule (1913)

=== Sacred music ===
==== Vocal ====
- Tantum ergo in E-flat major (1901)
- Psaume CXVI (Laudate Dominum) for four-part mixed choir and two organs (Éditions Musicales de la Schola Cantorum, "Répertoire moderne de la Musique Vocale"; 1902)
- Tu es Petrus, for four mixed voices and two organs (1935)
- Diffusa est (1936)
- Trois Tantum ergo (avril 1947) (Éditions Musicales de la Schola Cantorum)
- Notre Père qui êtes aux cieux, for baritone or mezzo-soprano and organ (1954, L. Philippo)
- Ave verum, for four mixed voices with organ accompaniment ad libitum

=== Chamber music ===
- Sonata no. 2 in C-sharp minor for violin and piano (1908, Édition Muelle)

=== Orchestral ===
- Au pays basque (1909)
- Les djinns (1913)
- Dans un parc enchanté (1917)
- Fantaisie pastorale (1919)
- Nymphes et naïades (1920)

=== Lyric theater ===
- L'or du Menhir (1934)
- Bacchus (1935)

Philip was also known to have composed about forty-five motets, three masses, and thirty mélodies.
