= Antoine Taudou =

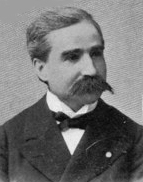
Antoine Taudou, by Pierre Petit

Antoine-Barthélémy Taudou (24 August 1846 – 6 July 1925) was a French music educator, violinist and composer.

== Life ==
Born in Perpignan, Taudou studied at the Conservatoire de Paris and won the Premier Grand Prix de Rome in 1869 with the cantata Françoise da Rimini. After the stay in Rome associated with the prize, he lived as a violinist in Paris. He was, among others, a member of the orchestra of the Théâtre de la Porte St. Martin and from 1872 to 1889 of the Orchestre de la Société des Concerts du Conservatoire. For several years he led the string quartet Quatour Taudou.

From 1883, he was professor for harmony at the Paris Conservatory. There, Louis de Serres, Erik Satie, Charles Koechlin, Jacques de La Presle, Aymé Kunc, Joseph Boulnois, Joseph-Ermend Bonnal and Francisco Braga were among his students.

Taudou composed music for the play Le Luthier de Crémone by François Coppée, which was performed at the Comédie-Française in 1876. He also composed a trio for flute, viola and cello, a trio for piano and strings, a string quartet, a violin concerto and several orchestral pieces. He was honoured as a knight of the Legion of Honour.

Taudou died in Saint-Germain-en-Laye.

== Works ==
- 1870: A melody and a barcarolle to verses by Victor Hugo; three pieces for violin: an Adagio, a "Neapolitan" and a "song".
- a musical illustration of François Coppée's play, Le Luthier de Crémone, which premiered on 23 May 1876 at the Théâtre-Français (Comédie-Française), with a prelude for solo violin. At that time, the critics underlined the beautiful inspiration of this score with its high level of style.
- Marche-Ballet, Chant des Montagnes and Marche Nocturne for orchestra
- Concerto pour violon
- a string quartet
- a piano trio,
- Trio for flute, viola and cello
- Au Valespir, chant pyrénéen, for voice and piano, lyrics by Pierre Talrich.
