= Alexandre Eugène Cellier =

French organist and composer

- Born: June 17, 1883; Molières-sur-Cèze, France
- Died: March 4, 1968 (aged 84) Paris, France
- Occupation: composer
- Instrument: organ

Alexandre Eugène Cellier (17 June 1883 in Molières-sur-Cèze – 4 March 1968 in Paris) was a French organist and composer.

Cellier studied organ with Alexandre Guilmant until 1908. In 1908, he won the first prize for organ at the Conservatoire de Paris. Before that, he also studied with Henri Dallier and Charles-Marie Widor. He was the organist Titulaire of the Temple de l'Étoile in Paris from 1910 until his death in 1968. The organ he used was a 3-manual Cavaillé-Coll organ with 32 stops, which was extended by Mutin (Cavaillé-Coll) in 1914.

In Louis Vierne's biography Mes Souvenirs, he describes Alexandre Cellier as a "cultivated musician" with improvisation skills. He gave concerts abroad.

He wrote a book about organ registration and is known as the French translator of the texts of the Bach Chorales.

== Selected compositions ==
Orchestral

- Paysages cévenols (1912)
- Sur la colline d’Uzès (1928)
- Le chant d’une flûte (1930)
- Chacun son tour, Suite humoristique for wind soloists and string orchestra (1934)
- Le Carnaval (1938)

Chamber music

- Piano Quintet No. 1 (1906)
- String Quartet No. 1 in A minor (1911)
- Piano Quintet No. 2 (1913)
- Sonata in G major for cello and piano (1920)
- String Quartet No. 2 (1923)
- Sonate en sol bémol majeur (Sonata in G♭ Major) for viola and piano (1923)
- Chevauchée fantastique for trumpet and piano (1944)
- Ballade for horn and piano (1949)
- Images médiévales for flute, oboe, clarinet, horn and bassoon
- Invocation for organ, violin, cello and harp

Organ

- Suite Symphonique pour Orgue en Sol majeur (1906)
- Méditation – published in book one of Les Maîtres Contemporains de l'Orgue in 1911
- Pièce Symphonique – published in book one of Les Maîtres Contemporains de l'Orgue in 1911
- Cortège – published in book four of Les Maîtres Contemporains de l'Orgue
- Dans la vieille Abbaye – published in book four of Les Maîtres Contemporains de l'Orgue
- Offertoire pour le jour de l'Ascension – published in book eight of Les Maîtres Contemporains de l'Orgue
- Étude en mi mineur (1916)
- Pèlerinages, Suite de 10 pièces (1923)
- Trois Chorals (1936)

1. La douleur, Choral-paraphrase sur la mélodie du Psaume 77
2. L'espérance, Choral-paraphrase sur la mélodie du Psaume 90
3. La joie, Choral-paraphrase sur la mélodie du Psaume 138

- Églises et Paysages (1943)
- Prélude et Fugue – published in Orgue et Liturgie, volume 33
- Choral-Prélude sur Psaume 65 – published in Orgue et Liturgie, volume 38
- Thème et variations sur le Psaume 149 du Psautier de la Réforme "Chantez à Dieu chanson nouvelle" – published in Orgue et Liturgie, volume 66
- Rhapsodie
- Concerto

Vocal

- Prière: J'ai cru, c'est pourquoi j'ai parlé (Prayer) for voice and organ; words from Psalm 116
