= Merxheim, Haut-Rhin =

Commune in Grand Est, France

Merxheim
- Commune
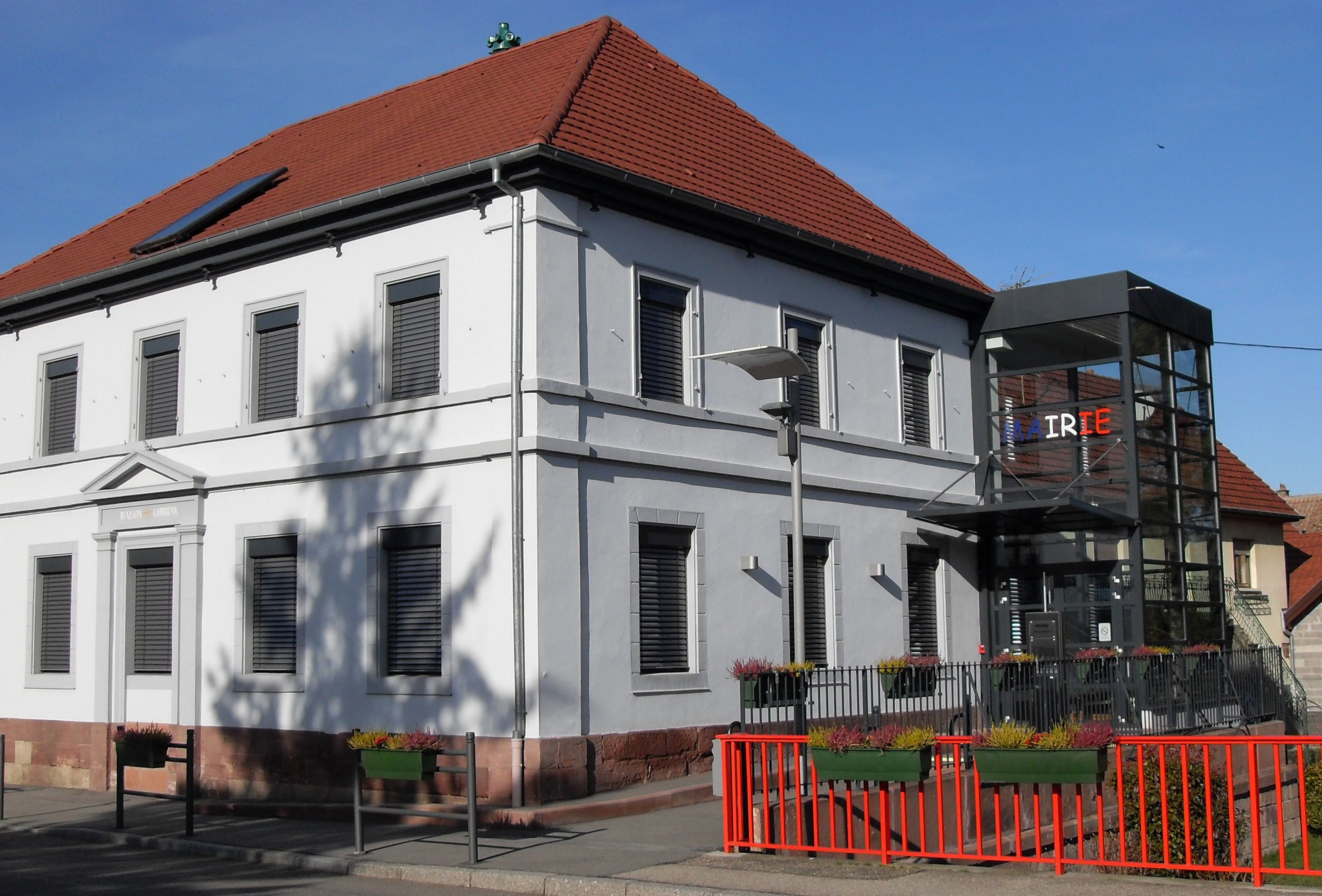
- The town hall of Merxheim

- Coat of arms
- Location of Merxheim
- Location within France Location within Grand Est
- Coordinates: 47°54′41″N 7°17′36″E
- Country: France
- Region: Grand Est
- Department: Haut-Rhin
- Arrondissement: Thann-Guebwiller
- Canton: Guebwiller

Government
  - Mayor (2023–2026): Stéphane Ziegler
- Area^{1}: 9.1 km^{2} (3.5 sq mi)
- Elevation: 220 m (720 ft)
- Highest elevation: 229 m (751 ft)
- Lowest elevation: 208 m (682 ft)
- Population (2023): 1,396
  - Density: 150/km^{2} (400/sq mi)
- Time zone: UTC+01:00 (CET)
  - Summer (DST): UTC+02:00 (CEST)
- INSEE/Postal code: 68203 /68500
- ^{1} French Land Register data, which excludes lakes, ponds, glaciers > 1 km^{2} (0.386 sq mi or 247 acres) and river estuaries.

Merxheim (French pronunciation: [mɛʁksaim]) is a commune in the Haut-Rhin department in Grand Est in north-eastern France. The French composer and organist Jules Bentz (1873–1962) was born in Merxheim.

== See also ==
- Communes of the Haut-Rhin département
