= Léon de Saint-Réquier =

- Born: 8 August 1872; Rouen, France
- Died: 1 October 1964 (aged 92)
- Education: Schola Cantorum de Paris
- Occupations: Classical organist; Music educator; Composer; Maître de chapelle

Léon de Saint-Réquier, born Léon-Edgard de Saint-Réquier (8 August 1872 – 1 October 1964) viscount of Saint-Réquier, was a French organist, composer, choir conductor, maître de chapelle and music educator.

== Biography ==
Born in Rouen, Léon de Saint-Réquier was a disciple of Alexandre Guilmant and Vincent d'Indy, his music teachers at the Schola Cantorum de Paris.

He became in turn a teacher at the Schola Cantorum and had Louis Durey as student, with whom he worked solfège, harmony, counterpoint and fugue. Among his other pupils were Celestino Piaggio, Marc de Ranse and Marcel Mihalovici.

Léon de Saint-Réquier was also maître de chapelle of the église Saint-Charles-de-Monceau in Paris.

He was an organist and choir conductor of the Société des Chanteurs de Saint-Gervais founded by Charles Bordes. Léon de Saint-Réquier held these two positions at Saint-Gervais from 1925 to 1939, when he was replaced by Paul Le Flem.

Léon de Saint-Réquier composed many works for organ and harmonium, as well as other sacred music pieces, for choir, including masses and a Requiem.

The cartoonist Christian Binet, also an accordionist, said about him: "It sounds like a joke but this aristocrat whose name is also that of a village in Normandy was also a composer. I'm probably the only one still talking about him but his little preludes are really very beautiful and easy to play. »
