= Tassis Christoyannis =

Greek operatic baritone

Tassis Christoyannis (born Piraeus, 1967) is a Greek operatic baritone. He studied conducting and composing at the Athens Conservatory and singing with Aldo Protti, winning the Aldo Protti Gold Medal in 1994. In addition to operatic roles he is known for his recordings of French melodies with American pianist Jeff Cohen, primarily for the Palazzetto Bru Zane and Aparté.

== Selected discography ==
- Félicien David: Melodies. Aparté, 2014.
- Edouard Lalo: Complete Songs Tassis Christoyannis, Jeff Cohen Aparté – AP110 2CD
- Benjamin Godard: Mélodies Tassis Christoyannis, Jeff Cohen Aparté – AP123
- Saint-Saëns: Mélodies Tassis Christoyannis, Jeff Cohen Aparté – AP132
- Fernand de La Tombelle: Mélodies Tassis Christoyannis, Jeff Cohen Aparté – AP148
