= Blanche Rozan =

Blanche Rozan was a minor figure in French musical life during the late 19th and early 20th century. Her birth and death dates are unknown.

== Career ==
Blanche Rozan was a student at the Marseille Conservatoire where she studied composition and organ under Henri Messerer (1838–1923).

In 1905 she was appointed a professor of piano at the Marseille Conservatoire.

She was a regular performer in the city's concerts, both as pianist and organist. Some sense of her reception as a performer is indicated from comments in the musical magazine Le Courrier Musical.

For example, from a concert review published in 1904:

Nous tenons cependant à signaler le mérite exceptionnel de Mlle Blanche Rozan, organiste de grand talent, élève de M. Messerer et jouant comme lui du Bach et du Franck; elle s'est montrée très bonne pianiste et parfaite musicienne dans un récital donné salle Messerer il y a une quinzaine de jours. Seule de tous les virtuoses entendus ces deux derniers mois, elle a présenté au public un programme de premier ordre et l'a parfaitement interprété : sonate op. 27 (Beethoven) jouée avec distinction et finesse, fantaisie chromatique et fugue interprétées avec toute la liberté et toute la puissance dramatique que comporte une œuvre aussi démesurée, et pour finir prélude, choral et fugue de Franck, où Mlle Rozan a su metttre une technique irréprochable et une sonorité chaude et veloutée au service d'une intelligence musicale très sûre et très largement compréhensible.

And a 1909 review stated:

Sans faire partie de l'orchestre, Mlle Blanche Rozan est toujours là, prête à s'asseoir devant les claviers et les pédales de l'orgue et elle manie le difficile instrument, non pas peut-être avec l'éclat de M. Bonnet ou de M. Daene. Elle aussi préfère l'art à la virtuosité. C'est en musicienne accomplie qu'elle interprète Haendel, Bach et Mendelssohn.

== Works ==
=== For organ ===
- Cantabile (Hamelle: Paris, 1902)
- Communion (Senart: Paris, 1912). Dedication: À mon élève Mademoiselle Eugénie Bouzige.
- Petite Prière (Senart: Paris, 1912). Dedication À Monsieur l'abbé J. Joubert.
