= Fernand de La Tombelle =

French organist and composer (1854–1928)

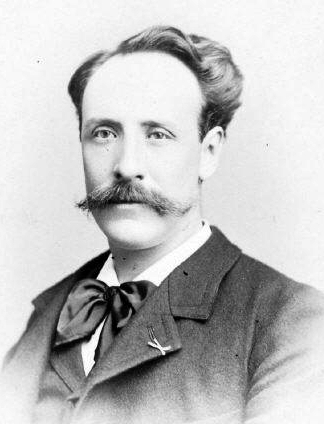
Fernand de La Tombelle

Baron Antoine Louis Joseph Gueyrand Fernand Fouant de La Tombelle (3 August 1854 – 13 August 1928) was a French organist and composer.

== Life ==
Born in Paris, Fernand de La Tombelle had piano lessons in his childhood with his mother Louise Gueyraud, a pupil of Sigismund Thalberg and Franz Liszt. From the age of eighteen he took private organ and harmony lessons with Alexandre Guilmant. At the Conservatoire de Paris he studied counterpoint, fugue and composition with Théodore Dubois. For his compositions he was twice awarded the gold medal at the Grand Prix Pleyel, in 1888 and 1894.

In the following years he performed as a concert organist throughout France. From 1896 to 1904, he was the first harmony teacher at the Schola Cantorum. Among his students were Louis Boyer, René de Castéra, Auguste Le Guennant, Marc de Ranse, Blanche Selva, Déodat de Séverac, and Jean Vadon.

In addition to music, La Tombelle, who was interested in many things, was active as a writer and columnist, sculptor and painter, art photographer, music ethnologist and astronomer. His wife Henriette Delacoux de Marivault (1857-1943) became known as a novelist, poet and playwright under the pseudonym Camille Bruno.

== Selected works ==
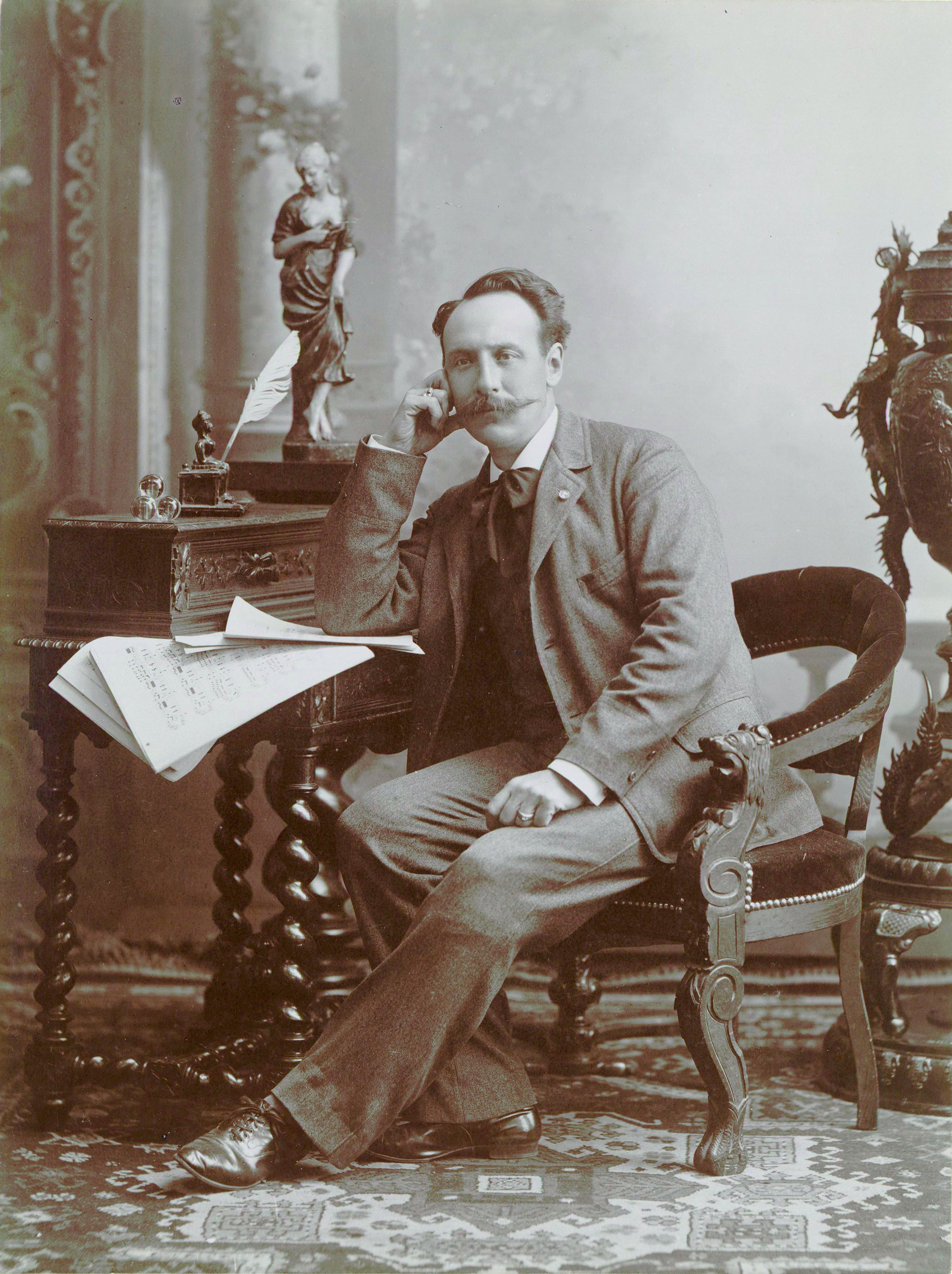
Fernand de La Tombelle in 1890

Œuvres lyriques

- Operettas: Un Bon numéro and Un Rêve au pays du bleu (1892)
- Cantatas: Sainte-Cécile, Sainte-Anne, Jérusalem, Jeanne d'Arc
- Choral works:
  - La Bonne Route, for male choir (1908)
  - La Chasse, for mixed choir and piano
  - La Fausse Enchanteresse, for male choir (1908)
  - Légende de la Glèbe, for male choir
  - Le Soleil de Minuit, for soprano solo and mixed choir
  - Le Furet, for male choir
  - Le Veilleur du Beffroy, for male choir (1908)
  - Les Épousailles, for mixed choir
  - Les Tambourinaires, for male choirs (1908)
  - Nous n'irons plus au bois, for male choir (1908)
  - Ode à Jeanne d’Arc, for mixed choir
  - Septembre, for male choir
  - Vers la Lumière, for male choir

Orchestral

- Incidental music: L'Apothéose de la cité, La Magdaléenne, La Muse fleurie, La Roche aux fées, Un Rêve au pays du bleu, Yannick
- Suites: Impressions naturelles, Livres d’images, Suite féodale, Tableaux musicaux
- Symphonic poem: Antar
- Menuet Gay
- Fantaisie for piano and orchestra, Op. 26 (1887)

Chamber music

- Many pieces for solo piano
- Prélude pour un conte de fées, for piano 4-hands
- Sonate in D Major, Op. 40, for violin and piano
- Suite for 3 cellos
- Piano Quartet in E Minor, Op. 24
- Piano Trio Op. 35 (1894)
- String Quartet in E Major, Op. 36
- Cello sonata in D Minor (1905)

Religious music

- Oratorios: Crux, Les Sept paroles du Christ, L'Abbaye
- Messes: Messe de Noël, for choir and organ, Messe brève
- Motets: Sancta Maria succurre miseris, Benedicta es tu, Tantum ergo, Ave verum, Adoro te devote
- Canticles: 2 Cantiques à la Très Sainte Vierge, for voice and organ: 1. La Couronne fleurie; 2. Chrétiens, Chrétiennes, à genoux!

Harmonium

- Méthode d'harmonium
- Méditation (in J. Joubert, Les Maîtres Contemporains de l’Orgue, vol. 1, Paris, 1912)
- Toccata en fa mineur (in J. Joubert, Les Maîtres Contemporains de l’Orgue, vol. 1, Paris, 1912)
- Cinquante Pièces d'Harmonium, L.-J. Biton, Saint-Laurent-sur-Sèvre (Vendée)
- In Pace (à la mémoire d'Alexandre Guilmant) (in Tribune de Saint-Gervais, XVIIe année, Numéro spécial)

Organ

- Offertoire pour Pâques, Pastorale-Offertoire et Six versets (Paris, Durand, c.1883)
- Les Vêpres du commun des Saints: VIIe série, Vêpres d'un Confesseur Pontife, 8 "antiennes" for organ, Schola Cantorum, n.d.
- Symphonie pascale, for organ (Entrée épiscopale; Offertoire; Sortie)
- Pièces d’orgue, Op. 23 (Paris: Richault, 1888–1891)
- Deuxième série de pièces d'orgue, Op. 33 (Paris: Richault, c.1891)
- Troisième série de pièces d'orgue, no. 1: Rapsodie Béarnaise (Paris: Costallat, 1900)
- Fantaisie sur deux thèmes (profane et grégorien): Chanson de Nougolhayro and Hymne de l'Avent (Paris: Schola Cantorum, 1907)
- Cantilène, for organ: Vox angelorum (Saint-Laurent-sur-Sèvre [Vendée]: L.-J. Biton, 1911)
- Suite d'orgue sur des thèmes grégoriens: 1. Offertoire sur "Cibavit eos"; 2. Élévation sur "Oculi" (Graduel); 3. Sortie sur "Lauda Sion" (Saint-Laurent-sur-Sèvre [Vendée]: L.-J. Biton, 1911)
- Suite d’orgue sur des thèmes grégoriens empruntés à l'Office de Noël: 1. Prélude et Introït sur des thèmes extraits de l'Introït "Puer"; 2. Offertoire sur un thème de l'Offertoire de la messe du jour; 3. Élévation d'après un thème de la Communion de la messe du jour; 4. Communion sur un vieux noël; 5. Sortie sur le thème "Jesu Redemptor omnium" (Toccata dans le style ancien) (Saint-Laurent-sur-Sèvre [Vendée]: L.-J. Biton, 1911)
- Suite d'orgue sur des thèmes grégoriens empruntés à l'Office de Pâques: 1. Prélude et Introït sur un thème de l'Introït; 2. Offertoire sur "Hæc dies"; 3. Élévation sur "Pascha nostrum"; 4. Communion sur un vieux Guillonéou, chant de Pâques, au temps antérieur à 1564 où l'année commençait le 1er avril; 5. Sortie sur l'Alleluia "Pascha nostrum" (Saint-Laurent-sur-Sèvre [Vendée]: L.-J. Biton, 1911)
- Suite d'orgue sur des thèmes grégoriens empruntés à l'Office de la Pentecôte: 1. Prélude et Introït; 2. Offertoire; 3. Communion; 4. Sortie (Saint-Laurent-sur-Sèvre [Vendée]: L.-J. Biton, 1911)
- Andantino en mi bémol majeur (in J. Joubert, Les Maîtres Contemporains de l'Orgue, vol. 7, Paris, 1914)
- Voces Belli: 1. Pro Patria; 2. Pro Defunctis; 3. Pro Vulneratis; 4. Pro Lacrymantibus; 5. Pro Deo (toccata), in Les Voix de la douleur chrétienne, vol. 1 (Bruxelles: A. Ledent-Malay, 1921)

Publications

- Les Pâtés de Périgueux, 1909 (Périgueux: P. Fanlac, 1990)
- L'Oratorio et la cantate (Paris, 1911)

== Discography ==
- Sonate pour violon et piano; Sonate pour violoncelle et piano; and other works: Detroit Chamber Ensemble, collection du Festival international Albert-Roussel, Azur Classical, AZC 2012
- Tombelle: Les Sept Paroles du Christ, conducted by Gilbert Patenaude
- Fernand de la Tombelle: Mélodies Tassis Christoyannis, Jeff Cohen Aparté (AP 148, 2017)
- 2020: Acte Préalable AP0484-85 – Fernand de La Tombelle - Organ Works 1
- 2021: Acte Préalable AP0517-18 – Fernand de La Tombelle - Organ Works 2
- 2023: Acte Préalable AP0545-47 – Fernand de La Tombelle - Organ Works 3

== See also ==
- fr:square Fernand de la Tombelle
