= Michel Boulnois =

French organist and composer

- Born: 31 October 1907; Paris
- Died: 30 November 2008 (aged 101); Provins
- Education: Conservatoire de Paris
- Occupations: Classical organist; Composer

Michel Boulnois (31 October 1907 – 30 November 2008) was a 20th-century French organist and composer.

== Biography ==
Born in Paris in a family of musicians, his father, Joseph Boulnois, was also an organist and composer. Michel Boulnois was only eleven years old when his father, a sub-officer, died at the age of 34 from the 1918 flu pandemic.

Michel followed the same artistic path, that of the Conservatoire de Paris where he was a student of Noël Gallon, Marcel Dupré, Henri Büsser, among others. He also followed courses of musical analysis by Nadia Boulanger. He graduated from the conservatory in 1937 with a first prize of organ. He became titular organist of the organ of the Église Saint-Philippe-du-Roule of Paris in 1937, a position he held for 53 years until 1990. He composed pieces for organ, orchestra and chamber music.

He died on 30 November 2008 in Provins, aged 101. He was married with Suzanne Sohet, composer and music educator.

== Principal works ==
Organ:

- 1944: Symphonie pour grand orgue
- 1952: 3 pièces pour la fête du Saint-Sacrement
- 1959–1963: Messe pour la fête de l'Annonciation
- 1974: Variations et fugue sur le Veni Creator
- 1976: Élégie pour violon et orgue.

== Sources ==
- Dictionnaire de la musique Les hommes et leurs œuvres, Marc Honegger, éditions Bordas
