= Édouard Mignan =

French organist and composer

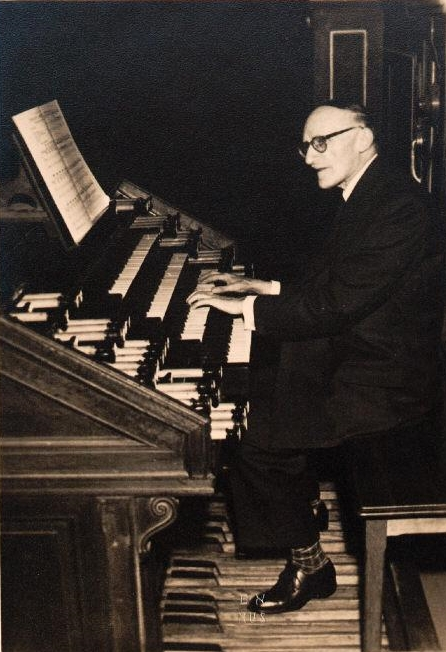
Mignan at the console of the grand organ of La Madeleine

Édouard Charles Octave Mignan (17 March 1884 — 17 September 1969) was a French organist and composer.

He was born in Orléans and 14 years old he became the organist of église Saint Paterne. He studied organ in Paris with Alexandre Guilmant and Louis Vierne and won the Grand Prix de Rome in 1912. He was organist at Saint-Thomas-d'Aquin from 1917 to 1935. He succeeded Henri Dallier as organist of la Madeleine in 1935 and held that post until 1962.

He died in Paris at the age of 85.

Preceded by Henri Dallier	Organist, Église de la Madeleine; 1935-1962	Succeeded by Jeanne Demessieux
