= Joseph Boulnois =

French organist and composer

- Born: 28 January 1884; Verneuil-en-Halatte, France
- Died: 20 October 1918 (aged 34); Military hospital of Chalaines
- Education: Conservatoire de Paris
- Occupations: Composer, organist
- Awards: Mort pour la France

Joseph Boulnois (28 January 1884 – 20 October 1918) was a French organist and composer.

== Biography ==
Boulnois attended the Conservatoire de Paris, where he studied counterpoint with Georges Caussade and organ with Louis Vierne. In 1906, he married the pianist Jane Chevalier, and they had a son the following year, Michel Boulnois, who also became a composer and organist.

In 1908, he was appointed to the organ of the Église Sainte-Élisabeth-de-Hongrie, in the 3rd arrondissement of Paris. He stayed there a short time and was appointed to the organ of the Église Saint-Louis-d'Antin in the 9th arrondissement. In 1909, he was singing conductor at the Opéra-Comique. He remained very active as a soloist, notably as co-founder with Marc de Ranse, of the Concerts spirituels de Saint-Louis d'Antin. He also played in the Opéra-Comique and performed in the Église Saint-Dominique de Paris church in the 14th arrondissement.

After the beginning of the First World War, Boulnois was mobilised at the Février Hospital of Châlons-sur-Marne, where he was a nurse from 1 January 1915. Appointed a corporal on 26 March 1915, he became a sergeant on 19 October 1916.

During this period, Boulnois produced his most important works: the Sonate pour piano, the Suite en 5 parties for cello and piano, and the Trio for violin, cello and piano.

Having contracted the 1918 flu pandemic, Boulnois was hospitalised on 15 October 1918. He died five days later, three weeks before the Armistice of 11 November 1918.

== Prizes ==
- 1901: 1st merit certificate in harmony (class of Antoine Taudou)
- 1905: First Prize of organ (class of Alexandre Guilmant)
- 1908: Second Prize in fugue (class of Charles Lenepveu)
- 1910: First Prize of accompaniment for piano (class of Paul Vidal)

== Principal works ==
=== Orchestra ===
- Sonate pour piano et petit orchestre
- Rhapsodie
- Marine
- Symphonie funèbre (unfinished)
- La Toussaint (1903), orchestration by Édouard Mignan (1919)

=== Piano ===
- Menuet pastoral
- Choral en fa dièse mineur
- La Toussaint (1903)
- Madrigal
- Pavane
- Scherzino
- Gigue
- Toccata, dedicated to his wife Jane Chevalier
- La Basilique (1918)
- Sonate (1918)
- Sainte Cécile au milieu d'un grand concert des anges (1918)

=== Organ ===
- Quatre pièces brèves en ré (1912)

=== Chamber music ===
- Quatuor à cordes (1916)
- Sonate pour violon et piano
- Sonate pour violoncelle piano, dedicated to Gérard Hekking (1917)
- Suite en cinq parties for piano and cello (1918)
- Trio pour piano, violon et violoncelle (1918)
- Noël, pour violon et piano
- Hiver, Neige, Noël, suite for cello and piano
- Hymne à Bacchus, for cello
- Jeux, for cello and piano
- Musette et Bidon, suite for cello
- Perdus dans un rêve, for cello and piano

=== Mélodies ===
- Pastorale, on a poem by Maurice Rollinat (1908)
- Accompagnement, poem by A. Samoin (1912)
- Les roses de Saâdi, poem by Marceline Desbordes-Valmore (1915)
- Nous n'irons plus au bois, poem by Théodore de Banville (1915)
- Souvenir, poem by André Chénier (1916)
- La Flûte, poem by André Chénier (1916)
- Recueillement, poem by Charles Baudelaire (1916)
- Trois sonnets, poem by Charles-Augustin Sainte-Beuve (1917)
- L'Ascension, poem by Sainte-Beuve (1917)
- La Mort des Amants, poem by Maurice Rollinat
- La Biche, poem by Maurice Rollinat, (Senart, 1923)
- L’Angelus, poem by P. Courrière, 1912 (Senart, 1923)
- La Cornemuse, poem by Maurice Rollinat, (1910), (Senart, 1923)

=== Stage music ===
- L'Anneau d'Isis, lyrical drama in 5 acts (1912)
