= Saint-Leon Church, Paris =

Saint-Leon Church
- Église Saint-Leon-de-Paris
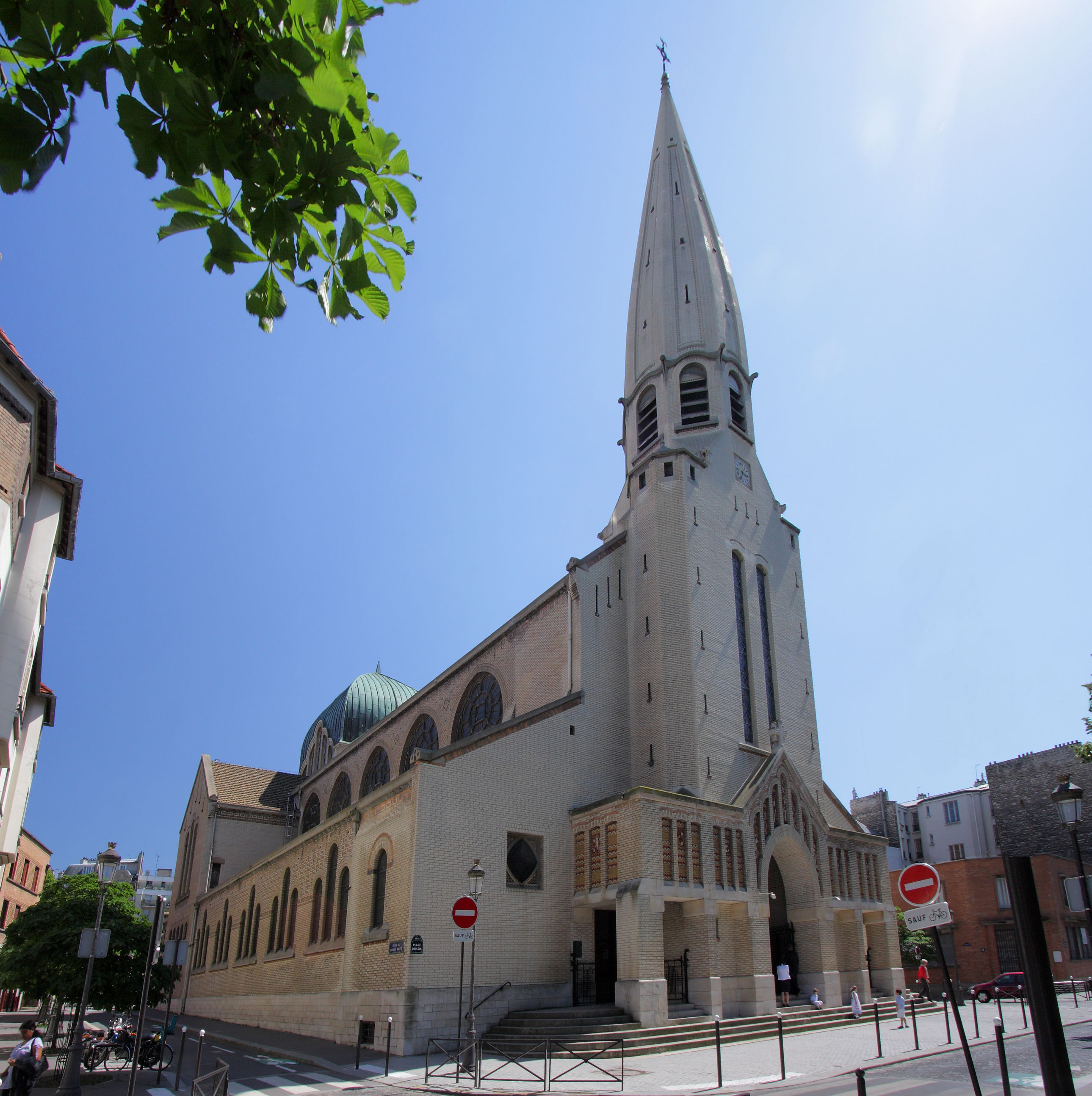
- Saint-Leon Church
- 48°50′41″N 2°16′45″E
- Location: 1 Place du Cardinal Amette in the 15th arrondissement of Paris
- Country: France
- Denomination: Roman Catholic

History
- Status: Parish church
- Founded: 1924

Architecture
- Functional status: Active
- Architect: Emile Brunet
- Style: Gothic Revival (exterior) and Art Deco (interior)
- Completed: 1934

Administration
- Archdiocese: Paris
- Parish: Saint-Leon, Paris

Saint-Leon Church (Eglise Saint-Léon) is a Roman Catholic church located at 1 Place du Cardinal Amette in the 15th arrondissement of Paris. Built between 1924 and 1934, with a neo-Romanesque facade and a neo-Byzantine e interior, with an abundance of elaborate mosaics and colorful period stained glass, it is a very good example of Paris religious architecture in the first half of the 20th century.

== History ==
The rapid growth of the Paris population in the early 20th century created a need for new churches. The church was designed by Emile Brunet, and the first stone laid in 1924. The construction used reinforced concrete and cement, which make the structure stronger and less expensive. The exterior was covered with polychrome bricks. The church tooks its name from Pope Leo I, and also from Cardinal Leon Amette of Paris, and Leon Thelier, the husband of the principal donor to the church construction. and

== Exterior ==
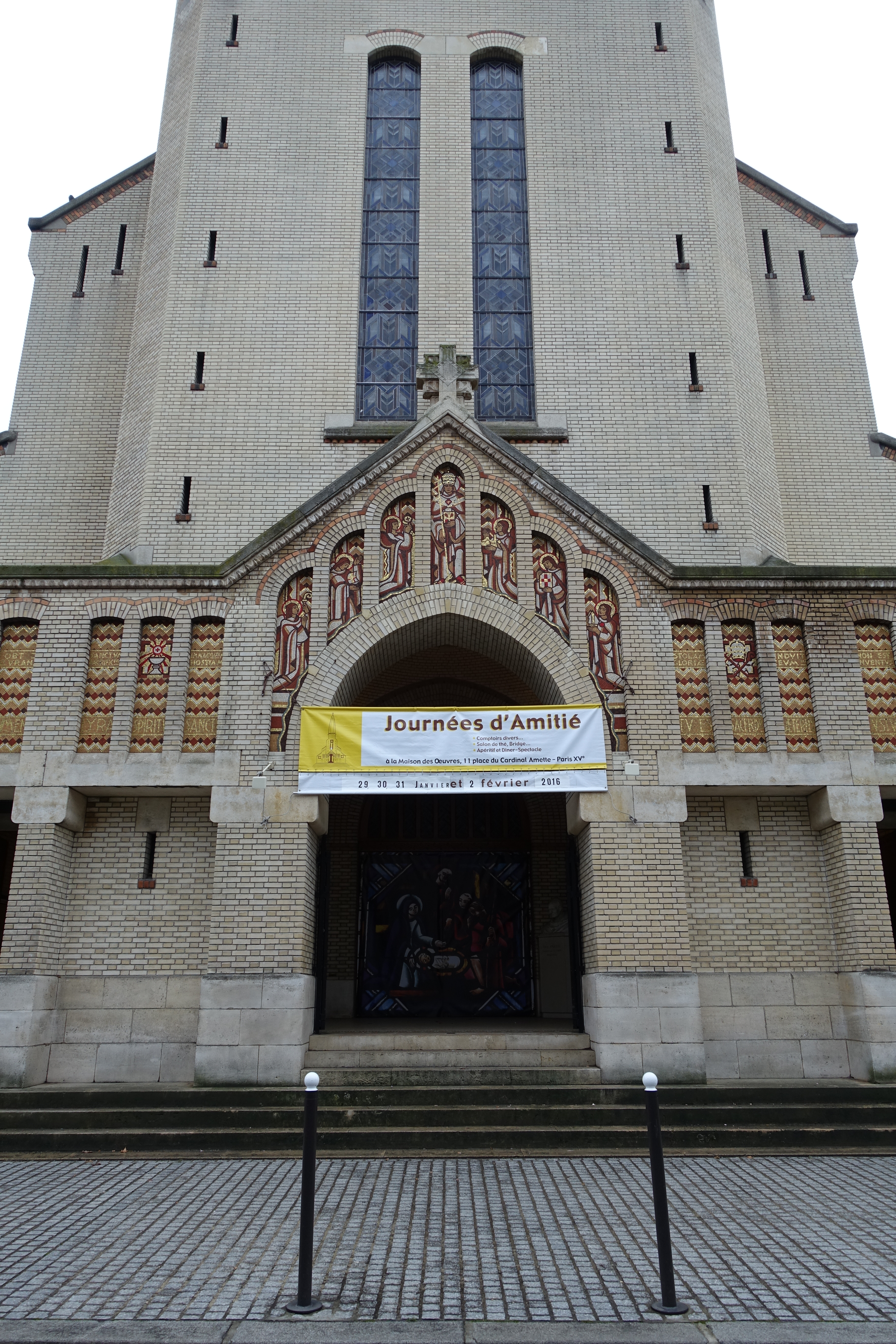
Entrance of the church with mosaics of Saint Leo the Great.

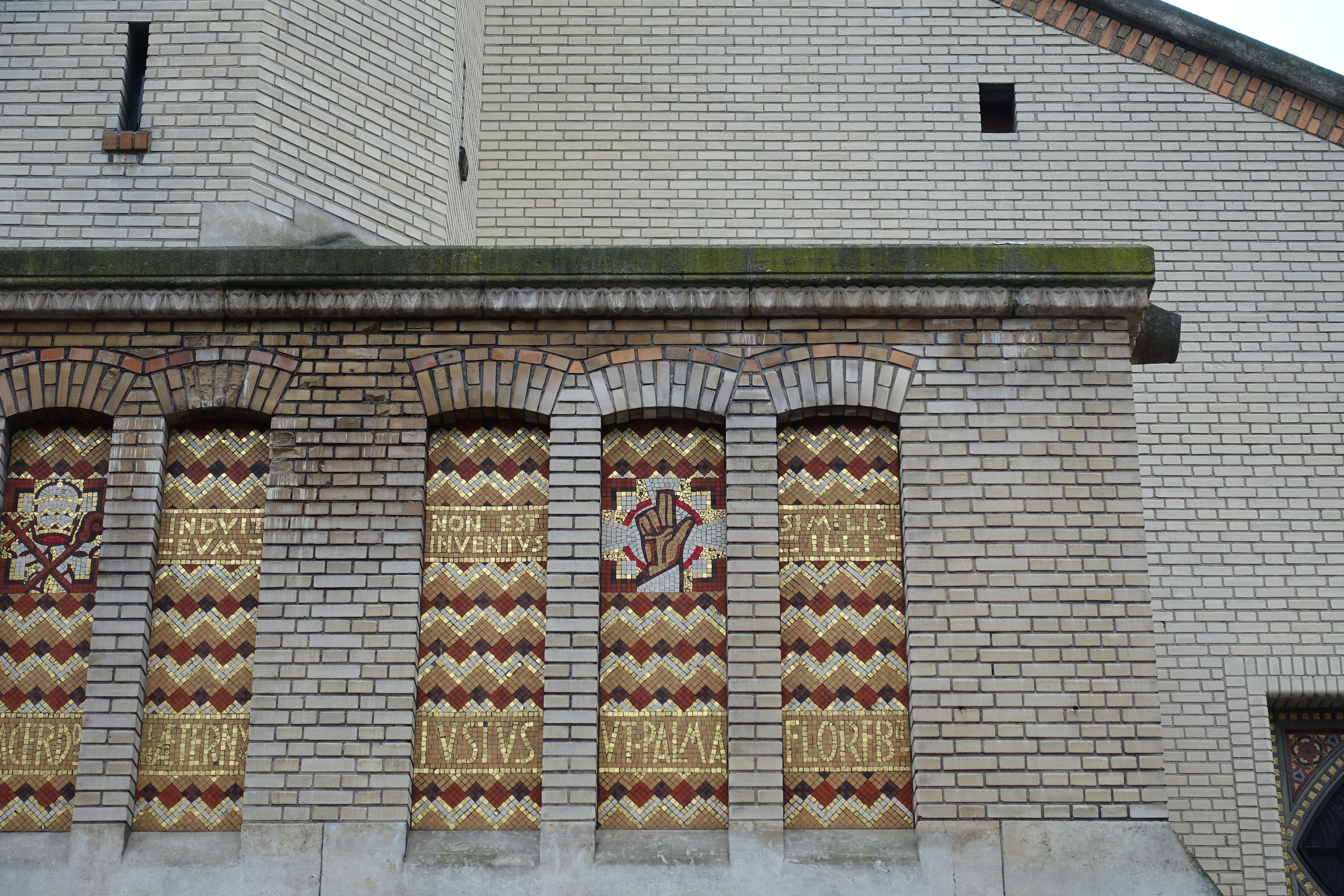
Mosaics and munticolor bricks decorating the facade

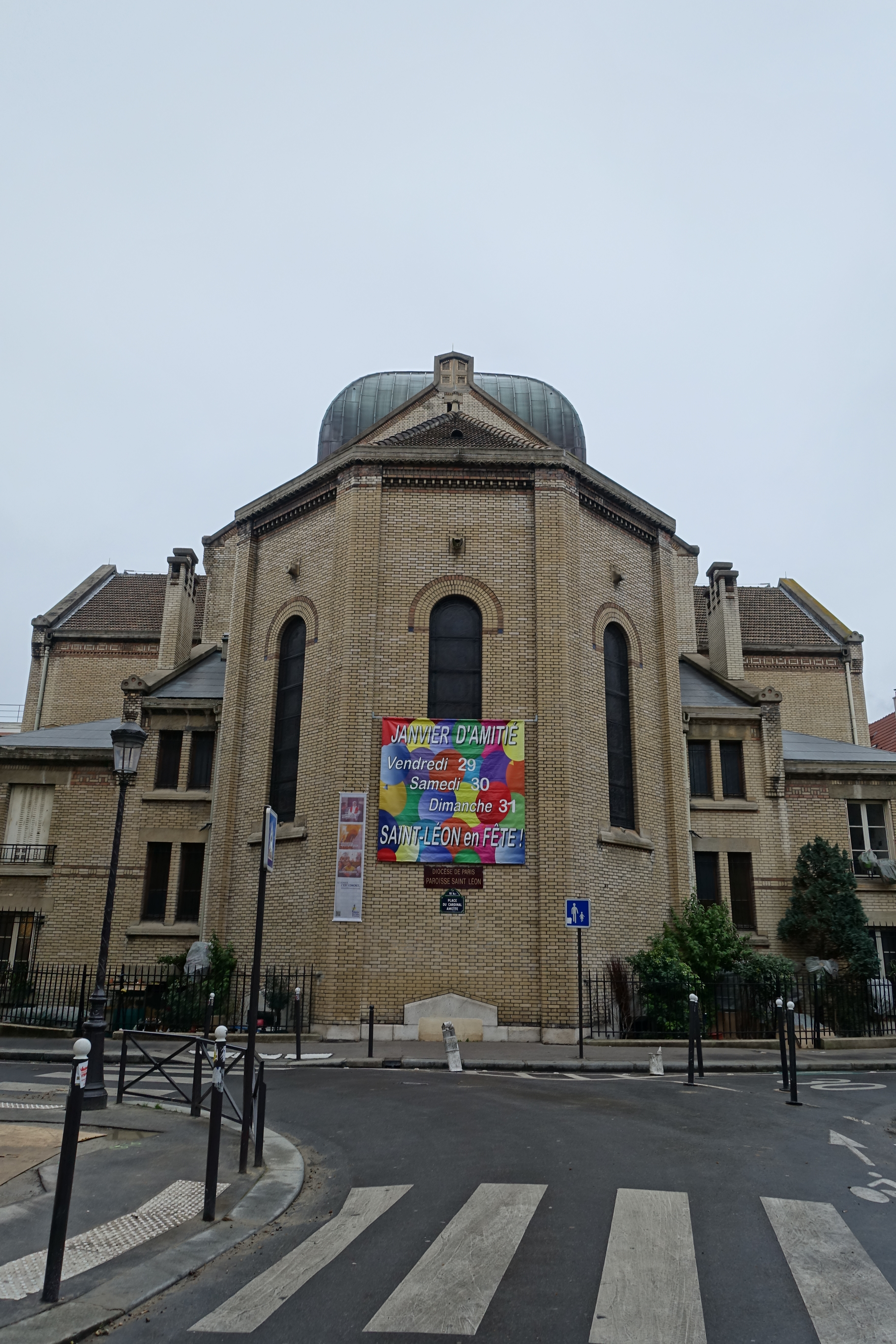
The choir of the church

The concrete structure of the church is entirely covered, inside and out, with multicolor bricks, which give it a more luminous and softer appearance. The facade is decorated with mosaics over the portal depicting scenes from the life of Saint Leo the Great, including the legendary account of Saint Leo persuading Atilla the Hun to depart Rome without destroying the city.

== Interior ==
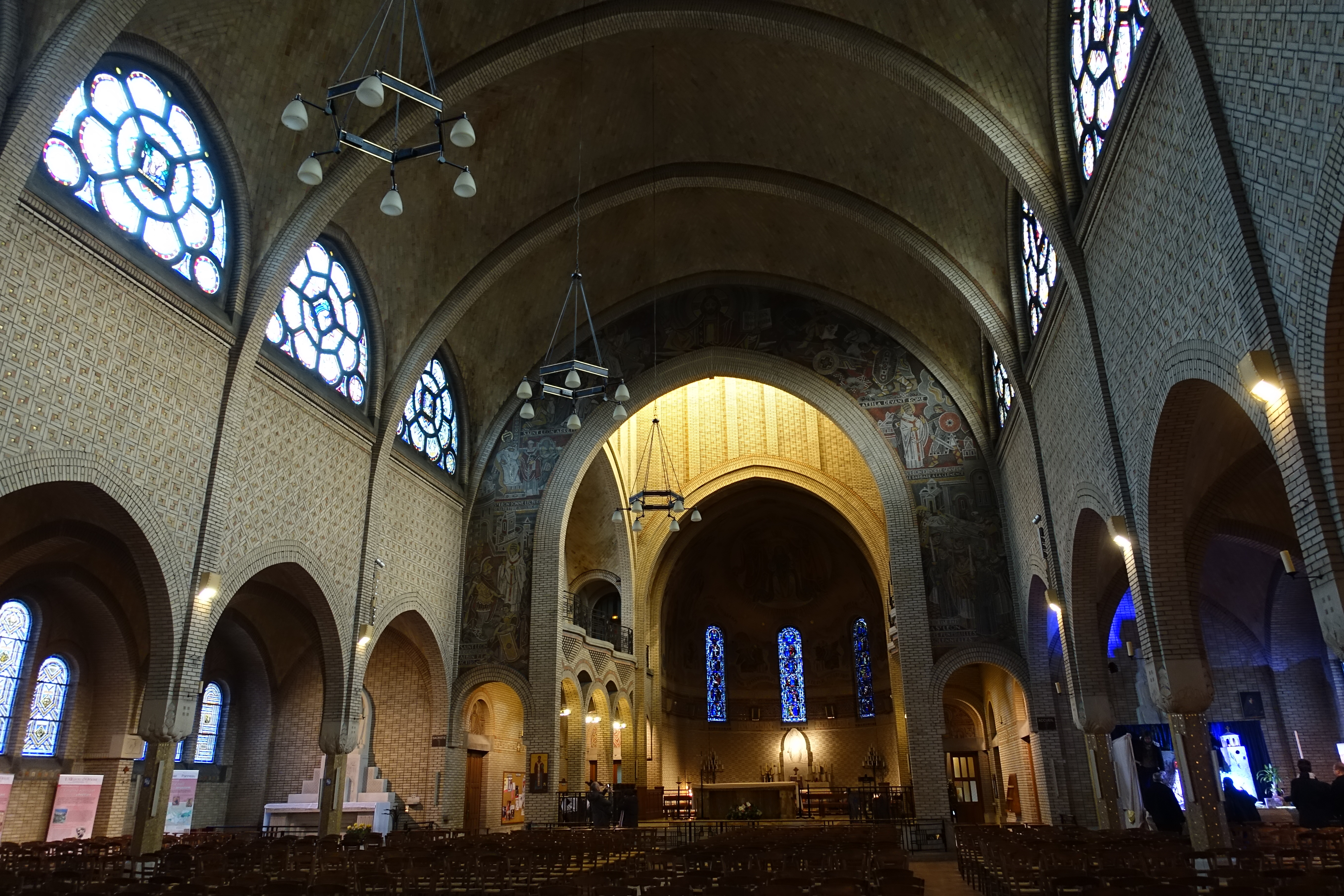
The nave and choir

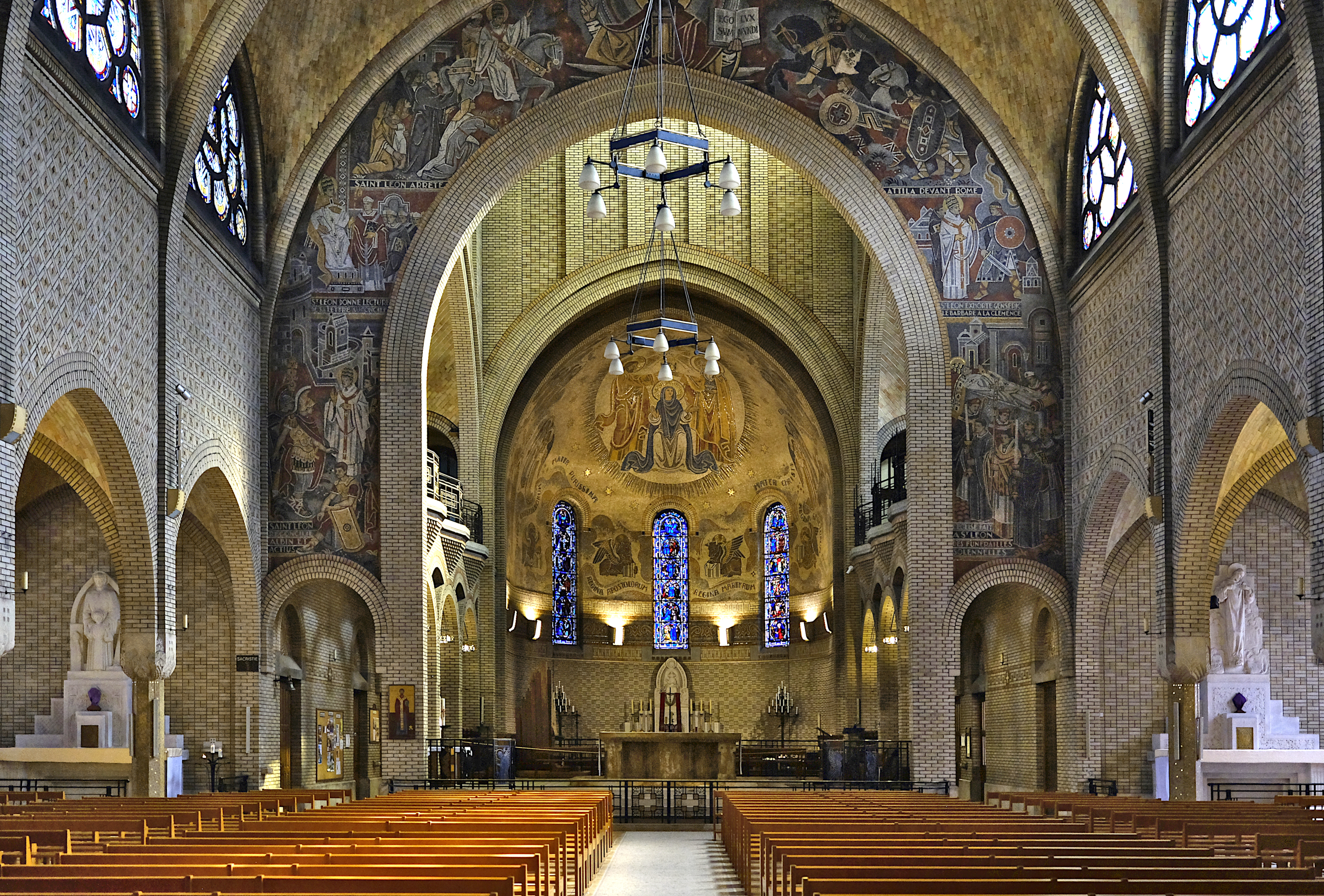
The choir

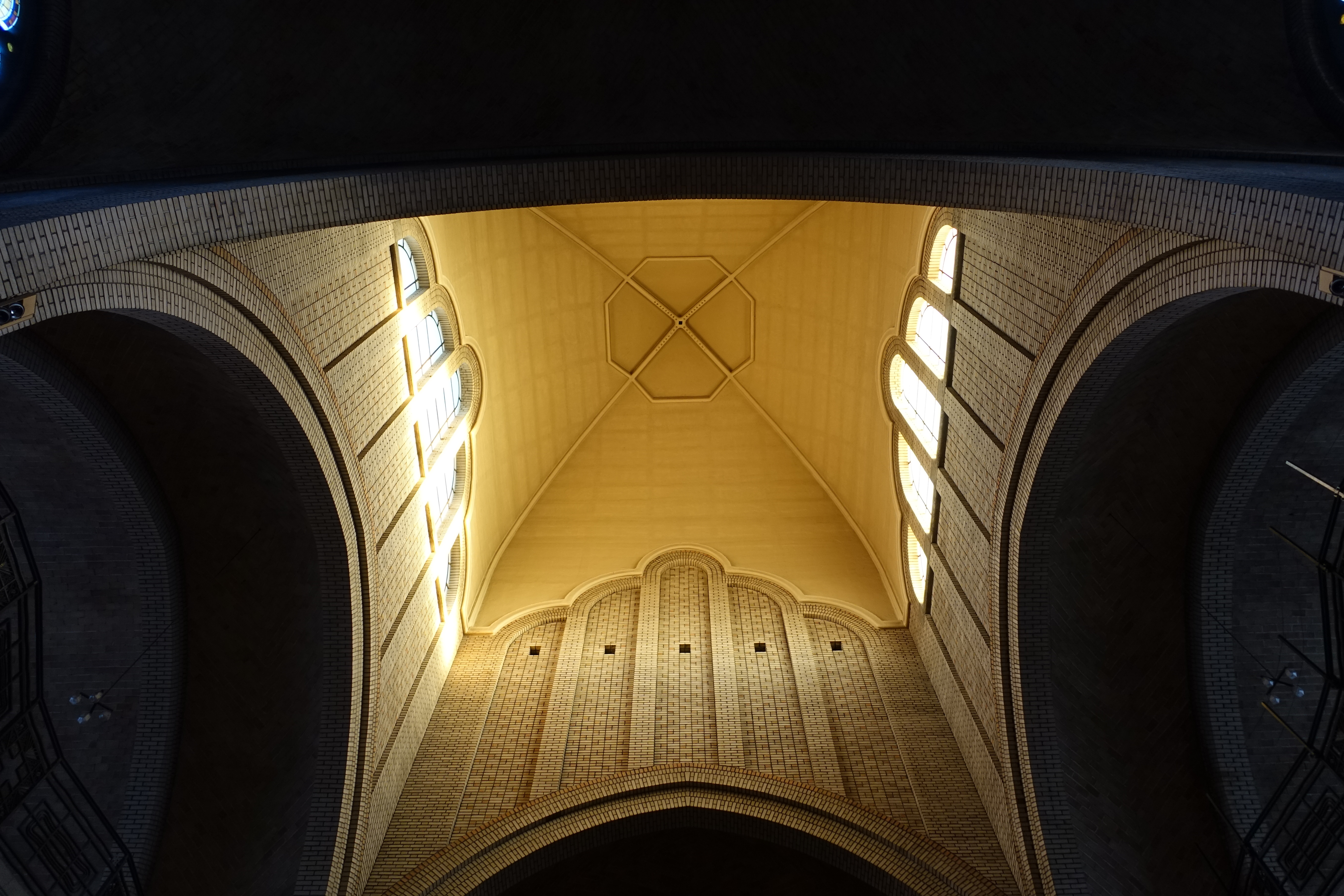
Interior of the spire
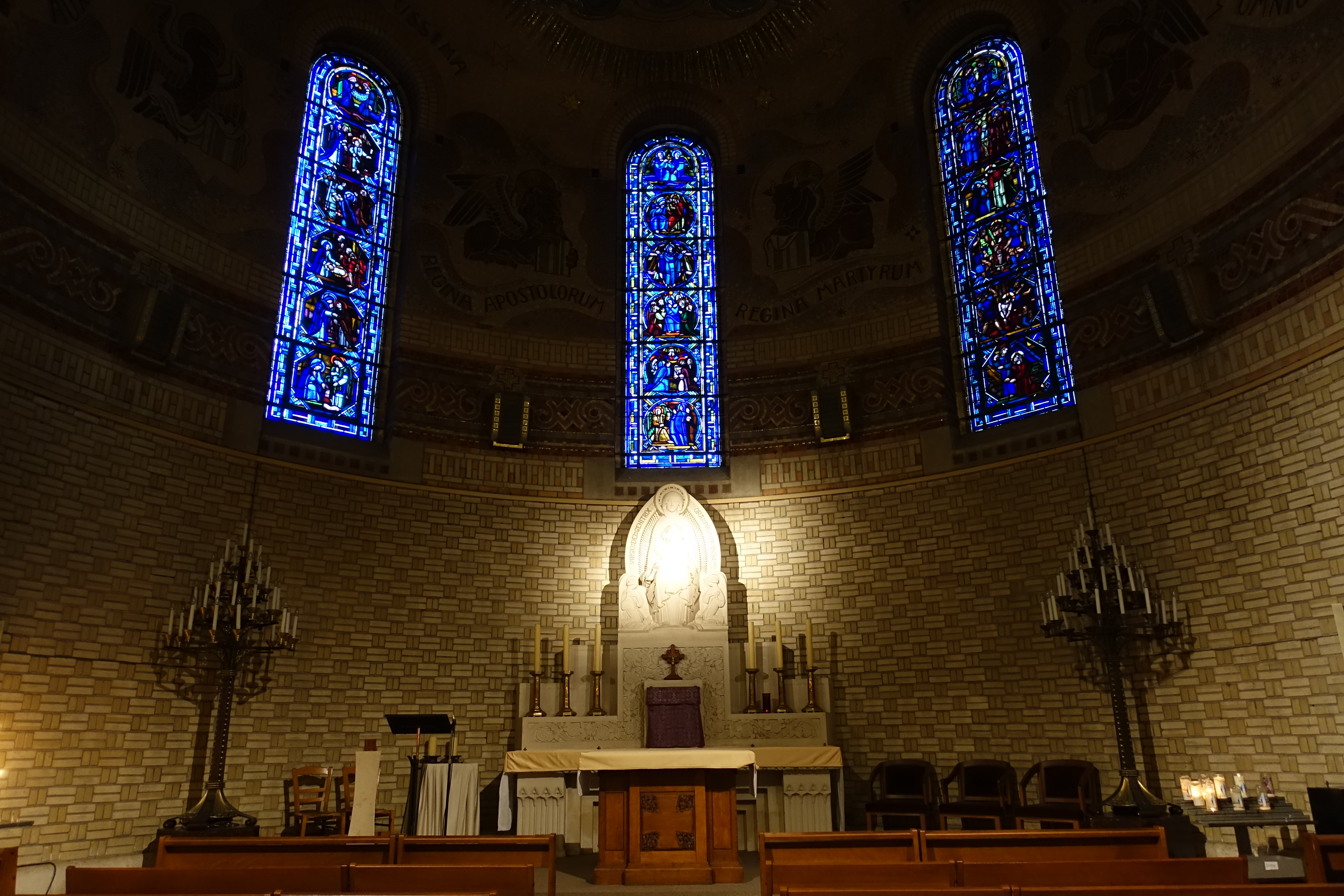
Stained glass in the chapel of the Virgin

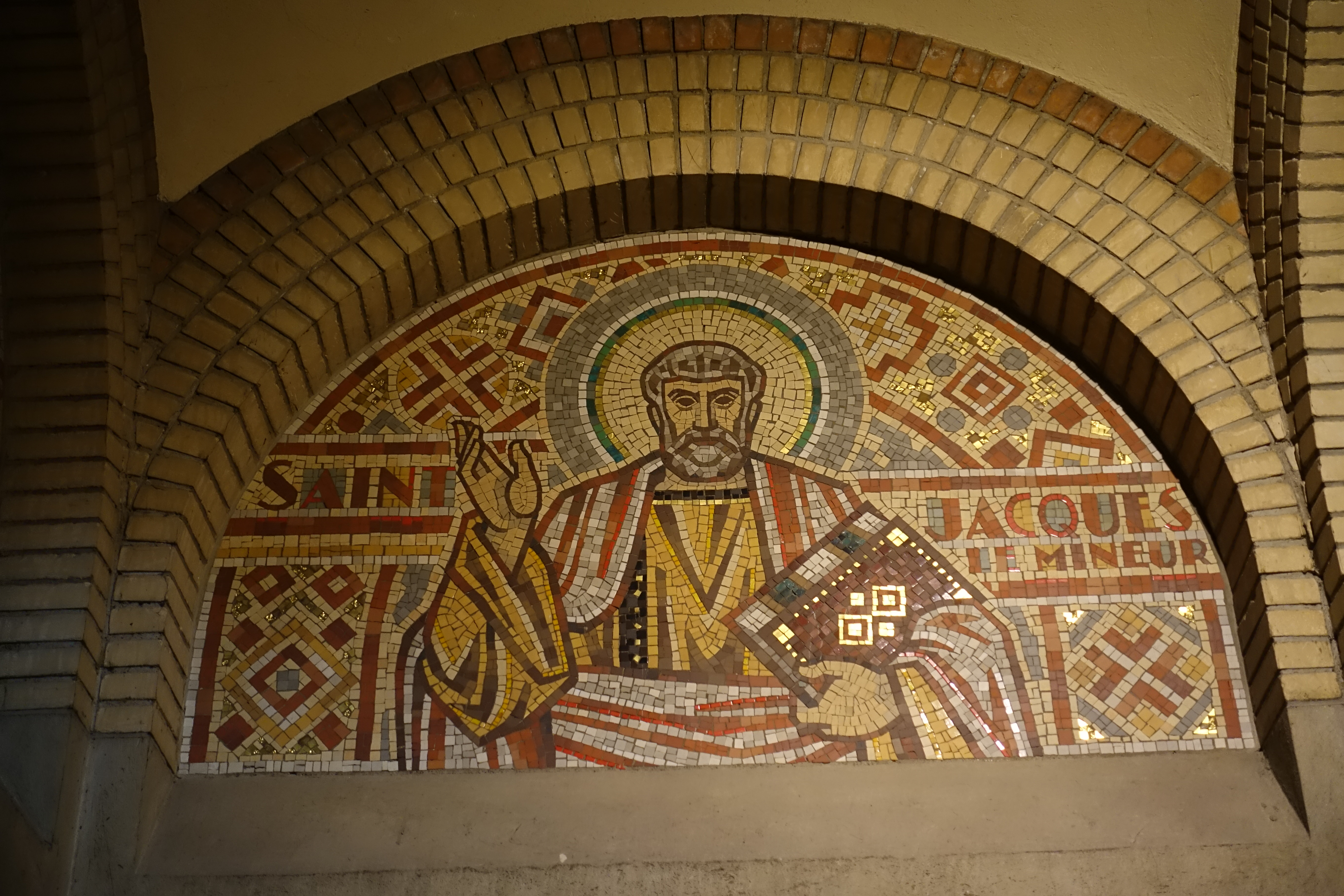
Interior mosaic of Saint john,

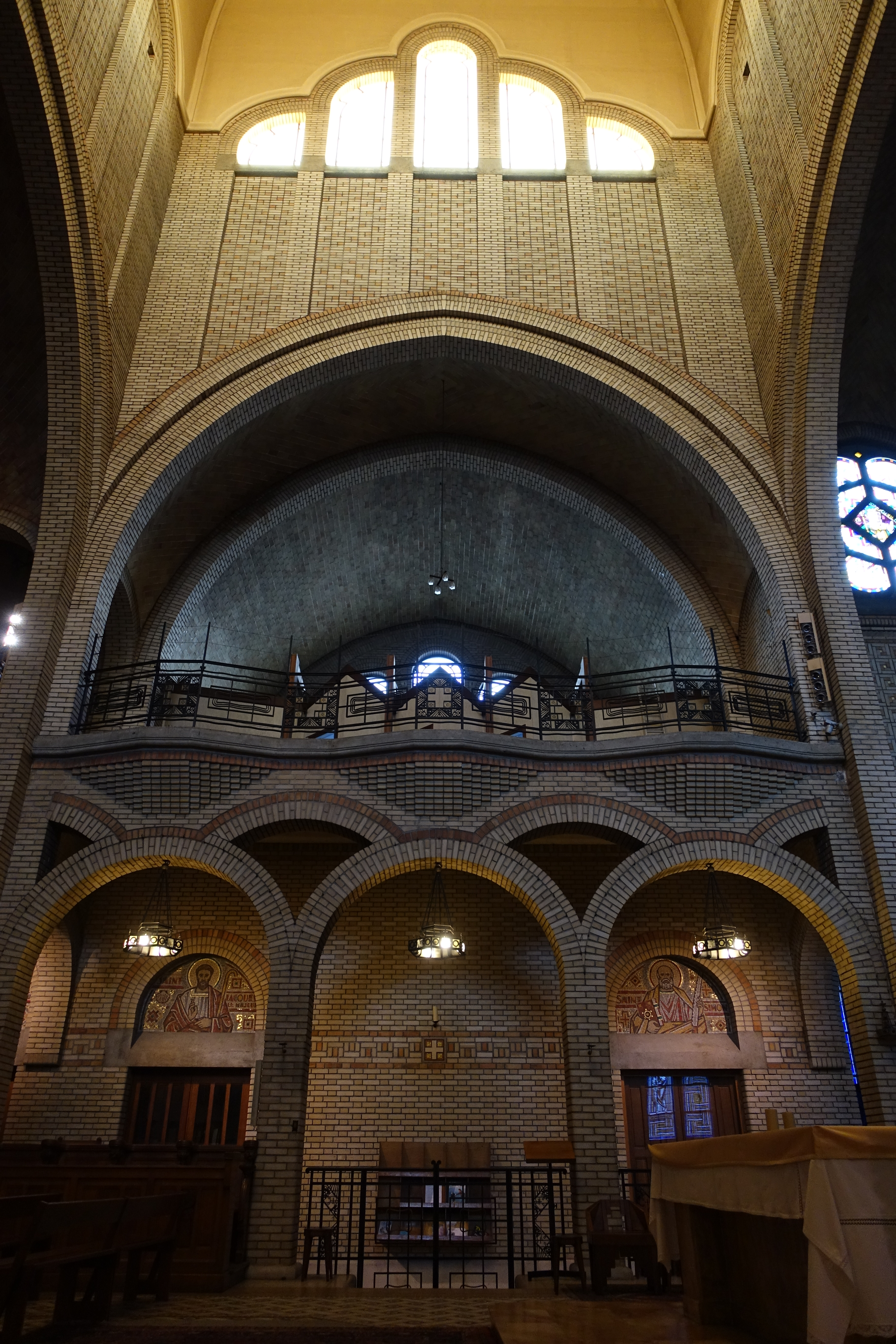
The tribune

The chapel of the Virgin, in the apse, is covered by a large mosaic in the vault above depicting "The crowning the Virgin." THe mosaic was made by Pierre Chaudiere and the daughter of Auguste Labouret. The central mosaic is surrounded by other scenes of the life of Virgin, and angels singing litanies to her. The stained glass windows in the chapel also depict scenes from the life of the Virgin.

== Stained Glass ==
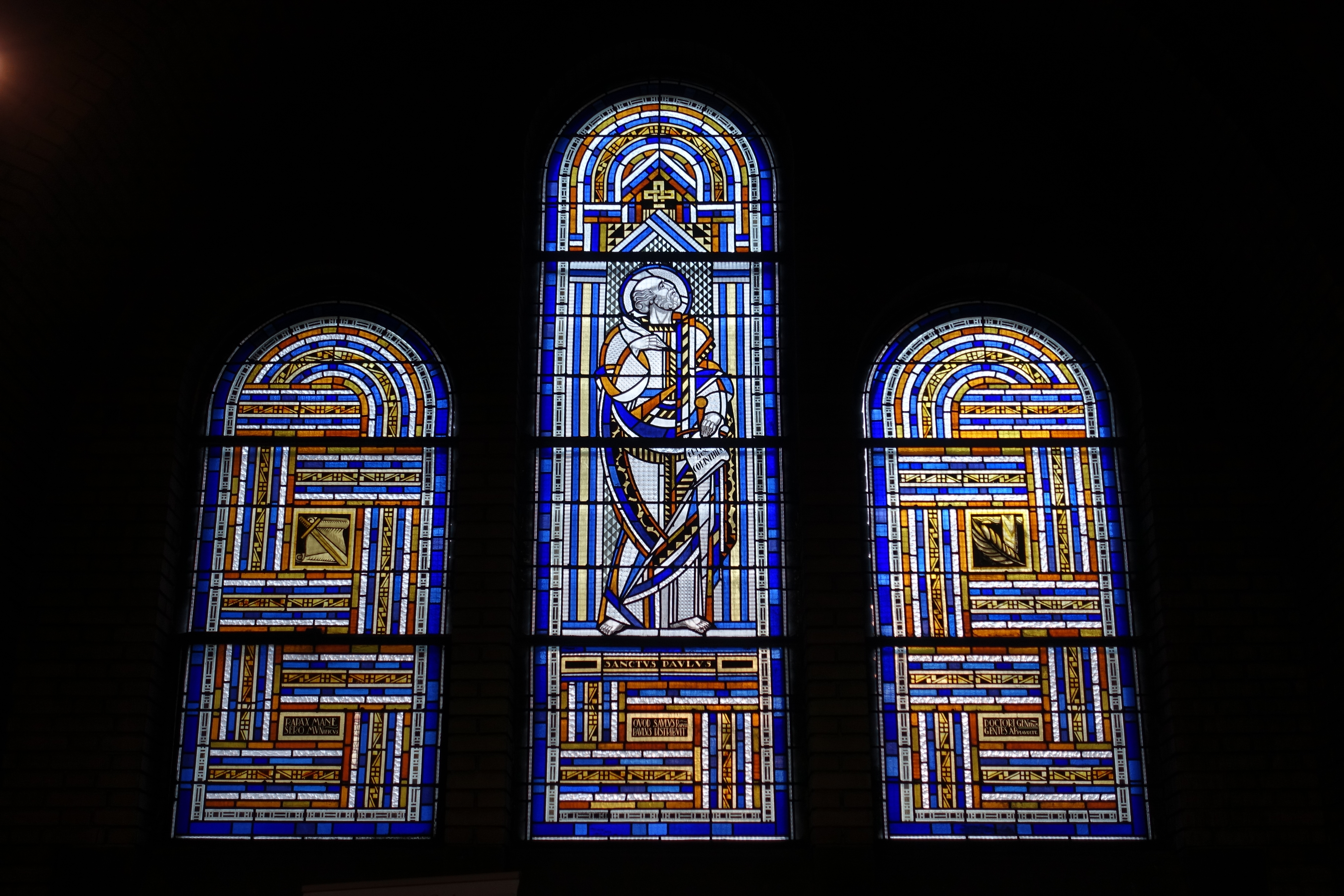
Window devoted to Saint Paul

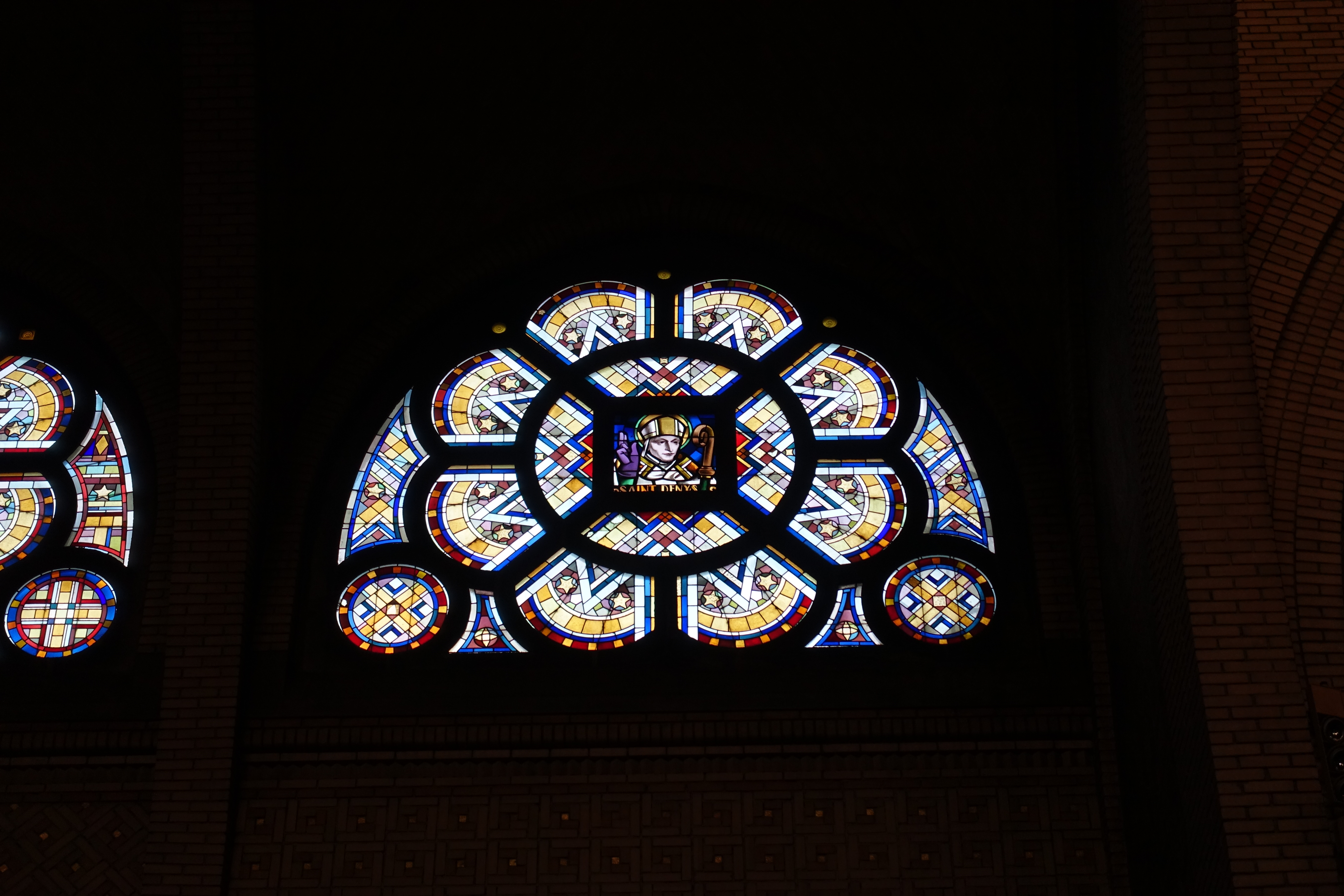
Window devoted to Saint Denis

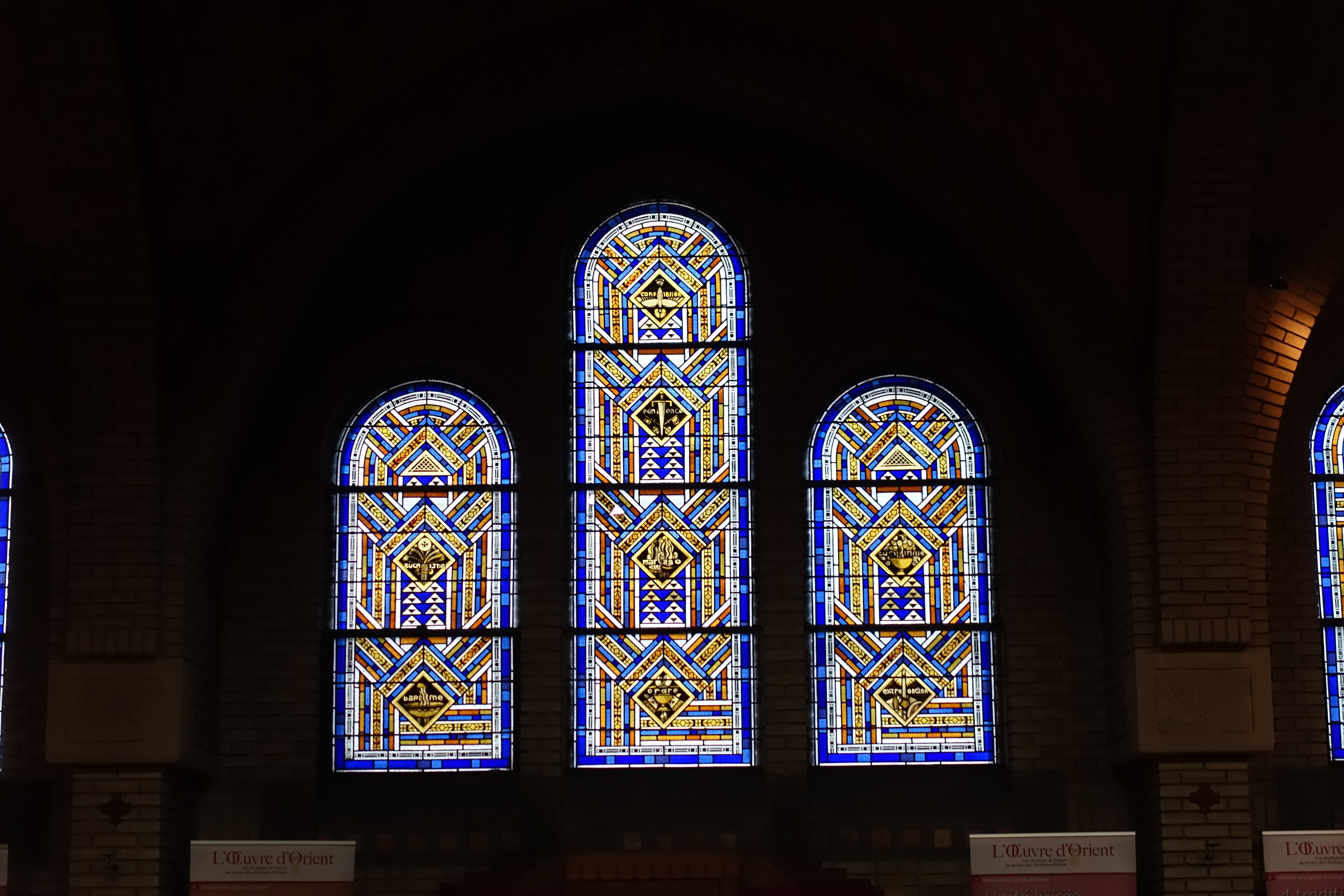
An abstract window

The stained glass windows in the church date mostly to about 1920. They come from the studio of master glassmaker Auguste Labouret.

== Sculpture ==
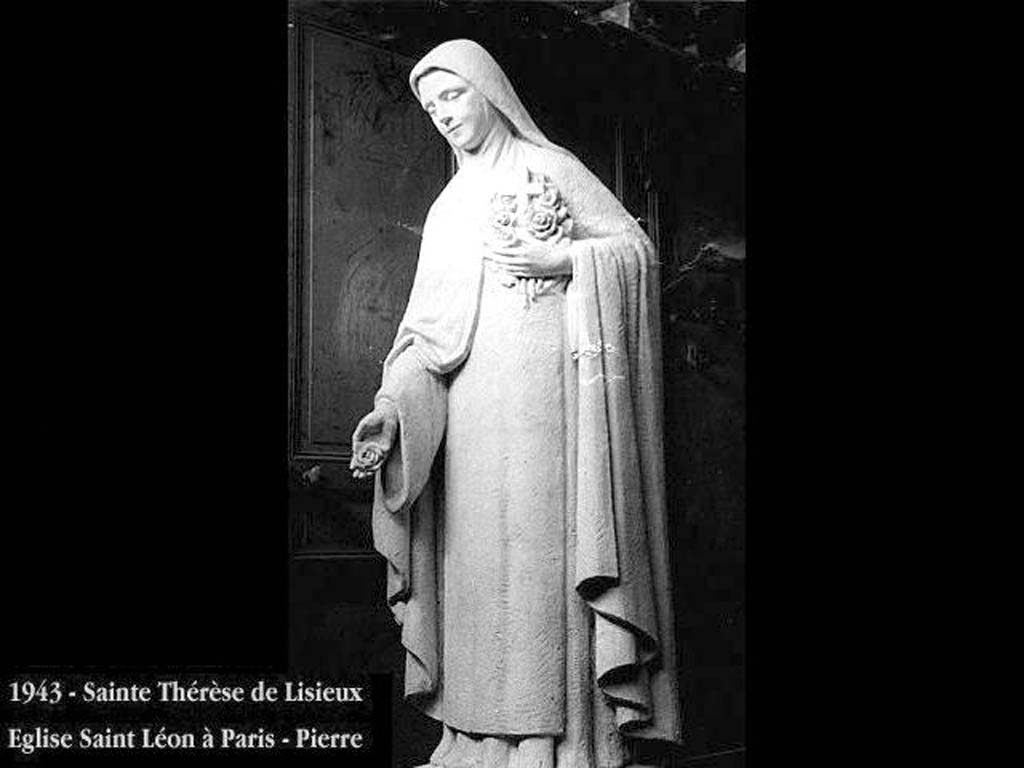
Saint Therese, by Bouchard (1930) (Saint-Leon Church, Paris)

Several sculptural works were made by Henri Bouchard (1875-1960)

== The Organ ==
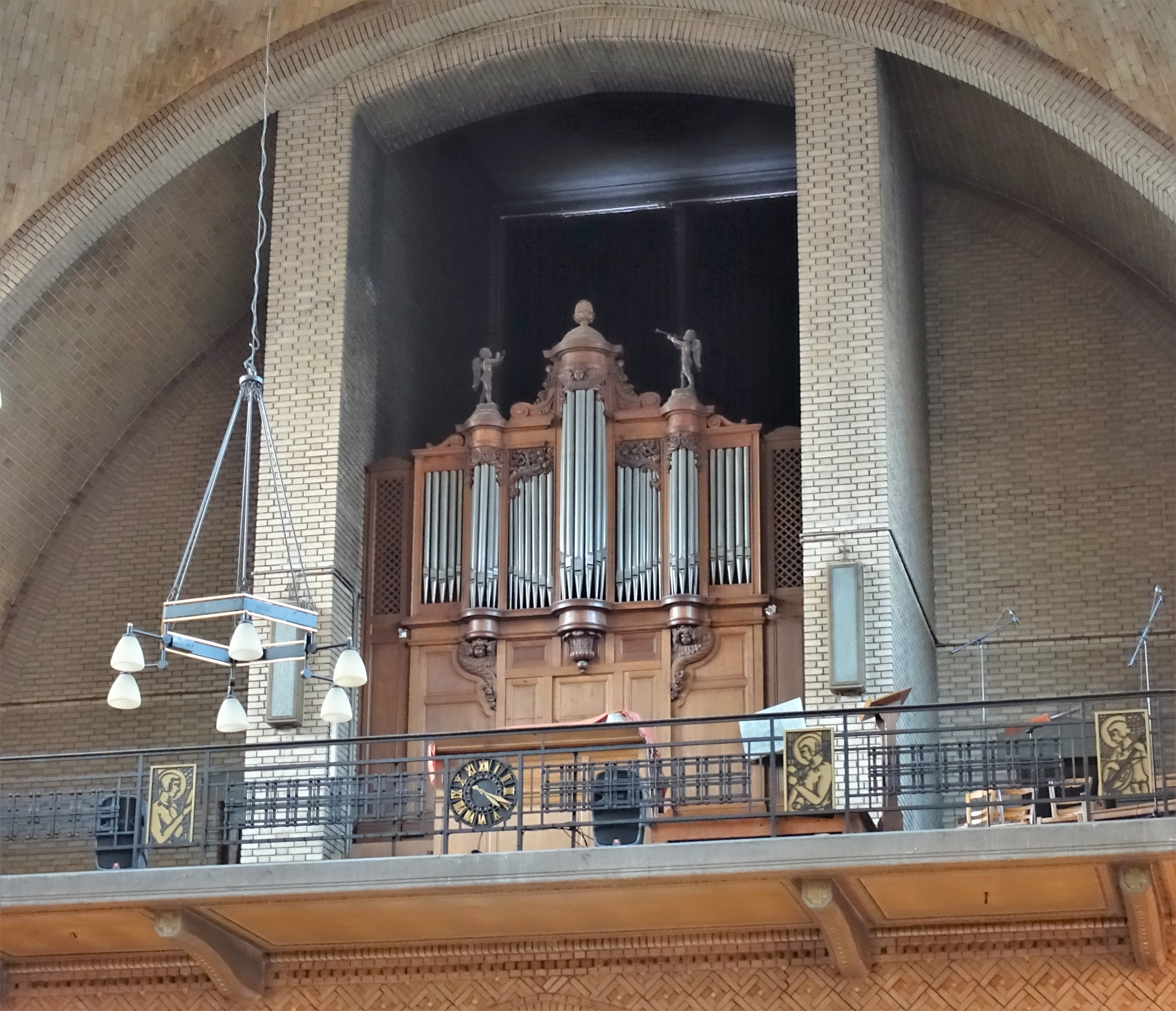
The organ in the tribune

The organ, located in the tribune at the rear of the church, was built by the French firm of Mutin in 1920.

== External Sources ==
- Article on site patrimoine-histoire.fr

== Bibliography ==
- "Paris d'eglise en eglise", Massin (editor), ISBN 978-2-7072-0583-4
