= Georges Guiraud =

Georges, Dominique, Jacques Guiraud (8 March 1868 – 11 March 1928) was a French organist, cellist and composer.

== Career ==
Born in Toulouse, Georges Guiraud first studied with the Jesuits and in 1898 won a first prize for cello at the Toulouse Conservatory where his father, Omer Guiraud, organist of Basilique Saint-Sernin de Toulouse teaches.

He entered the École Niedermeyer de Paris, then the Conservatoire de Paris. He followed the classes of Charles-Marie Widor, César Franck, and Jules Massenet. During this time in the capital, he was singing conductor at the concerts Colonne.

After his father's death, he returned to Toulouse in 1912, and took over from him at Saint-Sernin. He was then a professor of harmony at the Toulouse conservatory. Marcel Vidal-Saint-André dedicated his choral et mouvement vif to him and Émile Goué in 1923-24. Taking over from his father, he will also be a correspondent for L'Express du Midi.

He was also a great friend of composer Aymé Kunc.

He died in Toulouse on 11 March 1928.

== Titulariats ==
- From 1889 to 1895: Paris, Sainte-Croix and Saint-Jean
- From 1891 to 1912: Charenton-le-Pont, église paroissiale Saint-Pierre
- From 1912 to 1928: Toulouse, Basilique Saint-Sernin

== Works ==
- 1875: Fantaisie pour orgue
- 1877: L'organiste à Vêpres - 50 versets
- 1895: Sortie-Finale
- 1912: Offertoire pour les fêtes de la Sainte-Vierge
- 1914: Offertoire pascal sous forme de Variations sur l'O Filii
- 1926: Salut Solennel - Ave verum and Ave Regina Cælorum

But also masses, motets, melodies and piano pieces.

== Bibliography ==
- Pierre Guillot, Dictionnaire des organistes français des XIXe et XXe siècles, (p. 263)
- Louis Ollier, Georges Guiraud in Musique sacrée, Toulouse, 1928
