= Georges Taconet =

French composer

- Born: 17 August 1889; Mont Saint Aignan
- Died: 1962
- Era: 20th century

Georges Taconet (Mont Saint Aignan, 17 August 1889 – 1962) was a provincial French composer based in Le Havre. He won the local Normandy prize Le prix Gossier in 1926.

== Works, editions and recordings ==
Works

- L'Attente mystique, Triptych to poems by abbé fr:Louis Le Cardonnel (1862-1936) - orchestral version performed 1927, Le Havre
- Piano Quintet - performed 1932, Paris, favourably reviewed by Paul Le Flem
- Organ Prelude and Fugue - published by Hérelle, reviewed favourably in American Organist 1935
- Over sixty songs

Editions

- Downloadable Editions and Manuscripts

Recordings

- Taconet: Fourteen Songs. Dominique Méa (soprano) and Carlos Cebro (piano). Sonata in D minor for Violin and Piano: Fanny Clamagirand (violin) and Virginie Martineau (piano). Marco Polo 2002-2003, released 2005.
