= Henri Messerer =

French organist and composer

- Born: 19 May 1838; Marseille, France
- Died: 5 October 1923 (aged 85); Marseille, France
- Occupations: Organist, composer

Henri Messerer (19 May 1838 – 5 October 1923) was a French organist and composer. The Rue Henri Messerer in his hometown of Marseille was named in his honour.
