= Joseph Joubert (abbot) =

French Catholic priest and organist

Joseph Joubert (15 March 1878 – 15 November 1963) was a French Catholic priest and organist.

== Biography ==
Born in Coëx, Joubert was ordained a priest on 22 February 1902. He was appointed secretary and vice-chancellor of the Roman Catholic Diocese of Luçon in 1919. He also held the position of chaplain of the Carmel from July 1904 until his death.

He studied music at the Schola Cantorum de Paris from 1903 to 1904. Upon the sudden death of his predecessor, he had to abandon his studies in order to hold the position of titular organist of the Cavaillé-Coll organ of the Cathédrale Notre-Dame-de-l'Assomption de Luçon from 1904 to 1935, then from 1940 to 1946.

Joubert died in Luçon in 1963.

== Publications ==
He had the idea of soliciting composers to ask them for unpublished pieces for organ or harmonium (590) which he collected and had published in 8 volumes (1912 and 1914) at Éditions Maurice Senart in Paris. This important anthology is entitled Maîtres contemporains de l'orgue.

"We knew that the only pages of organ, written by Russian composers since the beginning of the 20th century, had been written at the request of a certain Joubert, organist from Luçon, in France. That is why we consider Joseph Joubert as the founder of the contemporary Russian organ school." Vladimir Shlyapnikoff, director of the Saint Petersburg Court Chapel, mentioned by abbot Abel Gaborit. (in Musica et Memoria)

After the First World War, in 1921 he began publishing parts for organ or harmonium in booklet form, Les Voix de la douleur chrétienne at A. Ledent-Malay in Brussel, as a tribute to the disappeared.

First booklet:

- Fernand de La Tombelle: Pro Patria, Pro Defunctis, Pro Vulneratis, Pro Lacrymantibus, Pro Deo.
- Henri Defossé: Marche funèbre, Épitaphe.
- Jacques Ibert: Choral à la manière de Franck.
- Joseph Jongen: 4 improvisations inspired by the Office of the Deceased: Requiem æternam, Pie Jesu, Quid sum miser, Recordare Jesu Pie.

Second booklet:

- Eugène Gigout: Pièce brève.
- Paul Silva Hérard: L’heure du Glas.
- Albert Alain: Suite héroïque.
- Marie-Joseph Erb: Élégie et Marche triomphale.
- Jean Vadon: Suite.
- Henri Dallier: Offertoire funèbre.

Third booklet:

- Jean Marcel Lizotte: Three Petits préludes in E minor.
- Gaston Singery: inspired by the deceased.
- Abbot Louis Boyer: Lamento.
- René Quignard: Dans les ruines d’une Église martyre, Nuit de Noël, Prière au Sacré Cœur de Jésus.
- Maurice Reuchsel:Offertoire hommage aux âmes héroïques, Communion Près d’une tombe délaissée, Absoute sur le chemin de l’Exil.
- Amédée Reuchsel: In memoriam, Fuga tristis.
- Émile Wambach: Ode funèbre and Action de grâces.

Fourth booklet of the Voix de la douleur chrétienne (1924):

- Henry Defosse from Paris, Jean-Marcel Lizotte from Bordeaux, Edmudo Torres from Seville, Marcel Courtonne from Nantes, Paul de Maleingreau from Brussels, L. Monière from Caen: Pièces funèbres, Mater dolorosa, Résignation, Sérénité, Gloria in excelsis, Venite ad me omnes, Ego sum vita, Confide Fili, Ne Recorderis, Credo quod Resemptor meus vivit, Stabat Mater dolorosa, Prière aux morts glorieux.

Fifth booklet:

- Désiré Walter: Stabat mater, Recordare, Oro supplex, Fiat et Lux perpetua.

Sixth booklet: À la mémoire des Morts de la patrie:

- Léo de Pachmann: Préludes, Elégie, Consolation, Prière, Apothéose.
