= Henri Dallier =

French organist (1849–1934)

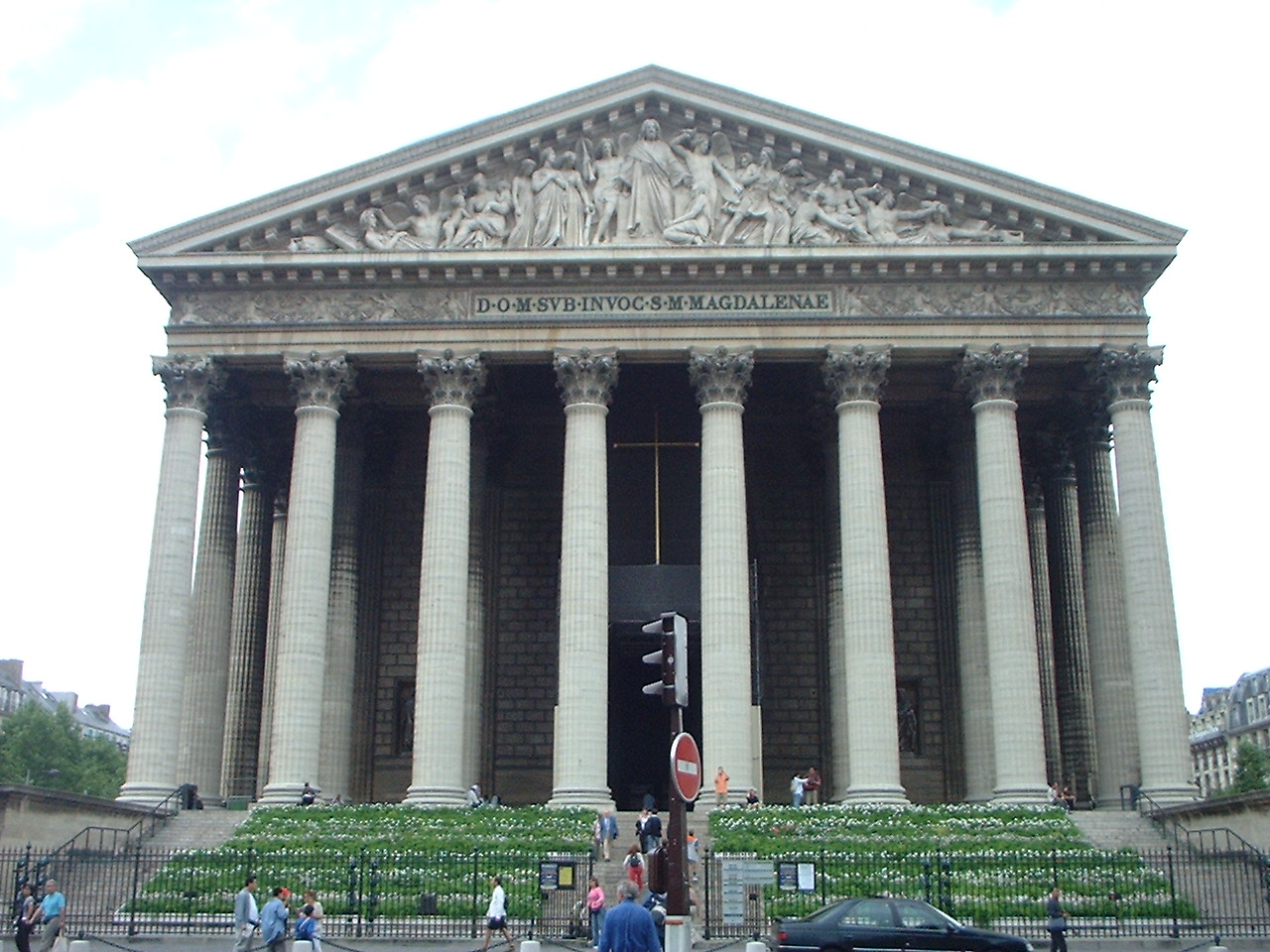
Église de la Madeleine in Paris

Henri Édouard Dallier (20 March 1849 – 21 December 1934) was a French organist.

== Career ==
Born in Reims, Dallier studied organ with César Franck at the Conservatoire de Paris and obtained First prize in organ and fugue in 1878. He became "titulaire du grand orgue" of Saint-Eustache in 1879 and in 1905 he succeeded Gabriel Fauré as the organist of la Madeleine.

== Compositions ==
- Cantilène, piano, 1874
- Six grands préludes pour la Toussaint, Op. 19, organ (Leduc, 1891)
- Contemplation, violin, piano/harp and organ (Leduc, 1891)
- Messe nuptiale (Leduc, 1894)
- In Deo caritas, organ (Leduc, 1895)
- Symphony No.1, Op. 50 (1908)
- Cinq invocations, organ (Lemoine, 1926)
- Fête joyeuse, trumpet and piano
- Fantaisie-Caprice, oboe and piano

Preceded by Gabriel Fauré	Organist, Église de la Madeleine; 1905-1934	Succeeded by Édouard Mignan
