= Alexandre Guilmant =

French organist and composer

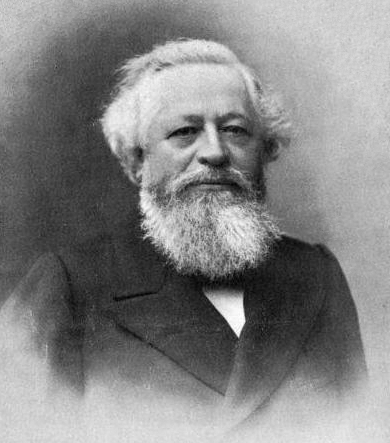
- Guilmant, 1896
- Born: 12 March 1837; Boulogne-sur-Mer, France
- Died: 29 March 1911 (aged 74); Meudon, France
- Occupations: Composer; Organist
- Organizations: La Trinité; Schola Cantorum de Paris; Conservatoire de Paris

Félix-Alexandre Guilmant (French pronunciation: [feliks alɛksɑ̃dʁ ɡilmɑ̃]; 12 March 1837 – 29 March 1911) was a French organist and composer. He was the organist of La Trinité from 1871 until 1901. A noted pedagogue, performer, and improviser, Guilmant helped found the Schola Cantorum de Paris. He was appointed as Professor of Organ in the Conservatoire de Paris in 1896.

== Biography ==
Guilmant was born in Boulogne-sur-Mer. A student first of his father Jean-Baptiste and later of the Belgian master Jacques-Nicolas Lemmens, he became an organist and teacher in his place of birth.

In 1871 he was appointed to play the organ regularly at la Trinité church in Paris, and this position, organiste titulaire, was one he held for 30 years. Guilmant was known for his improvisations, both in the concert and church setting. His inspiration came from Gregorian chants, and he was greatly noted amongst his colleagues for his mastery of the melodies. From then on, Guilmant followed a career as a virtuoso; he gave concerts in the United States (the first major French organist to tour that country), and in Canada, as well as in Europe, making especially frequent visits to England. His American achievements included a 1904 series of no fewer than 40 recitals on the largest organ in the world, the St. Louis Exposition Organ, now preserved as the nucleus of Philadelphia's Wanamaker Organ.

With his younger colleague André Pirro, Guilmant published a collection of scores, Archives des Maîtres de l'Orgue (Archives of the Masters of the Organ), a compilation of the compositions of numerous pre-1750 French composers. The collection was printed in ten volumes, the first in 1898 and the last (which Guilmant did not live to finalize) in 1914. Guilmant provided a rather similar survey of organ pieces by foreign composers, publishing l'École classique de l'Orgue (Classical School of the Organ). These anthologies, despite all the musicological developments which have taken place since Guilmant's own time, remain very valuable sources of early music.

In 1894 Guilmant founded the Schola Cantorum with Charles Bordes and Vincent d'Indy. He taught there up until his death at his home in Meudon, near Paris, in 1911. In addition, he taught at the Conservatoire de Paris where he succeeded Charles-Marie Widor as organ teacher in 1896. As a teacher, Guilmant was noted for his kindness and attention to detail. His students' recollections feature accounts of a particular focus on all facets of a note: attack, release, character. Marcel Dupré was the most celebrated of his many students. Others included Augustin Barié, Joseph-Arthur Bernier, Joseph Bonnet, Alexandre Eugène Cellier, Abel Decaux, Gabriel Dupont, Charles Henry Galloway, Philip Hale, Edgar Henrichsen, Édouard Mignan, and Émile Poillot. See: List of music students by teacher: G to J#Alexandre Guilmant.

Guilmant's interest in Marcel Dupré began when the latter was a child. Albert Dupré, father of the celebrated Marcel, studied organ with Guilmant for seven years prior to his son's birth. In Dupré's memoirs, he includes an anecdote where Guilmant visits his mother upon his birth and declares that the child will grow up to be an organist. After frequent visits throughout his childhood, Marcel Dupré began studying with Guilmant formally at age 11. From this time until his death, Guilmant championed the young virtuoso and did much to advance his career. Guilmant's house was later purchased then demolished by Dupré and rebuilt. His home organ was also sold to Dupré.

== Compositions ==
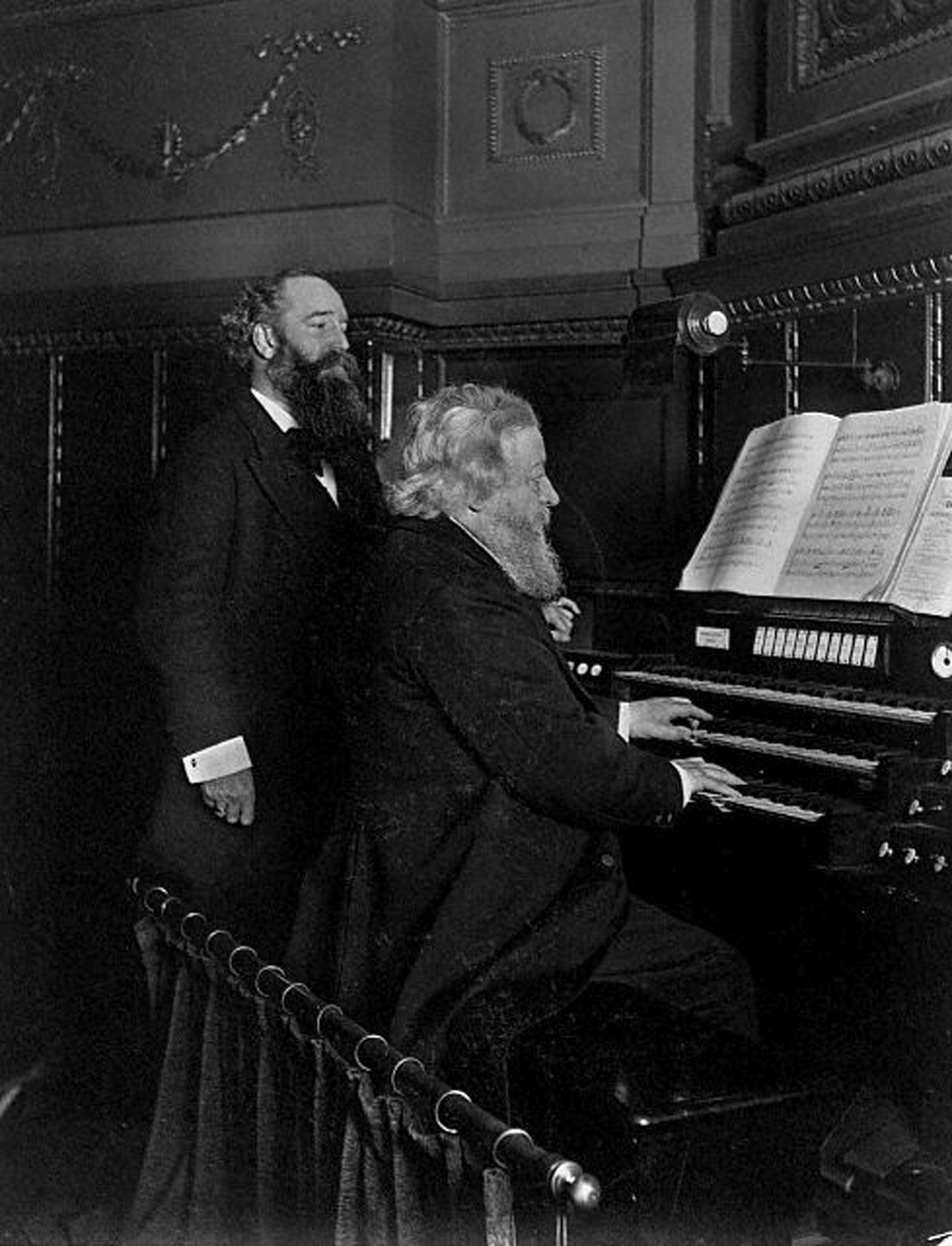
Clarence Eddy and Alexandre Guilmant, 1898

Fugue alla Händel in F major

Guilmant was an accomplished and extremely prolific composer. Unlike Widor, who produced a great deal of music in all the main genres, Guilmant devoted himself almost entirely to works for his own instrument, the organ. His organ output includes: 'Pièces dans différents styles', published in 18 books; 'L'organiste pratique', published in 12 books; Eighteen 'Pièces Nouvelles'; and 'L'Organiste liturgique', published in 10 books. Guilmant's Eight Sonatas were conceived with the Cavaillé-Coll organ of La Trinité in mind, and are therefore symphonic in style and form, taking their place alongside the symphonic organ works of César Franck and the Organ Symphonies of Charles-Marie Widor.

The Sonate No. 1/Symphonie No. 1 for organ and orchestra, Op. 42, was programmed by Sergei Koussevitzky in the 1930s, but was not heard again until Igor Buketoff revived it for a 1977 live recording with the Butler University Orchestra (note, the composer's name is misspelled "Gilmont" in the source).

Though few in number, his works for instruments besides the organ have not been entirely neglected. For example, the Morceau Symphonique is one of the most frequently performed trombone solos, enjoying longstanding popularity among both professional and advanced student trombonists.

== Opus list ==
| Opus | Title |
|---|---|
| 1 | Ave Verum pour Choeur et Orgue |
| 2 | O Salutaris Hostia pour Choeur et Orgue |
| 3 | Faux-Bourdons - Chant de la Commission de Reims et Cambras |
| 4 | Messe en Fa majeur pour Choeur et Orgue |
| 6 | Première Messe à 4 Voix, Choeur et Orgue |
| 7 | Te Deum pour Choeur et Orgue |
| 8 | Quam Dilecta (Psaume 83) pour Choeur et Orgue |
| 9 | Messe Brève pour Choeur et Orgue |
| 11 | Troisième Messe Solennelle pour Choeur et Orgue |
| 12 | Cinq Litanies en l’honneur de la bienheureuse Vierge Marie à une, deux, trois ou quatre voix |
| (13) | Échos du mois de Marie - Cantiques à une ou deux voix égales avec accompagnement d'orgue ou d'harmonium |
| 14 | 12 Motets pour Choeur et Orgue |
| 15 | Pièces dans différents styles pour orgue, livraison 1 |
| 16 | Pièces dans différents styles pour orgue, livraison 2 |
| 17 | Pièces dans différents styles pour orgue, livraison 3 |
| 18 | Pièces dans différents styles pour orgue, livraison 4 |
| 19 | Pièces dans différents styles pour orgue, livraison 5 |
| 20 | Pièces dans différents styles pour orgue, livraison 6 |
| 21 | Kyrie Eleison pour Choeur et Orgue/Orchestre |
| 22 | Prière pour Violoncello et Piano |
| 23 | Deux Morceaux pour Harmonium |
| 24 | Pièces dans différents styles pour orgue, livraison 7 |
| 25 | Pièces dans différents styles pour orgue, livraison 8 |
| 26 | Pastorale pour Harmonium et Piano duo |
| 27 | Prière et Berceuse pour Harmonium |
| 28 | Canzonetta pour Harmonium |
| 29 | Fughetta de Concert pour Harmonium |
| 30 | Aspiration Religieuse pour Harmonium |
| 31 | Scherzo pour Harmonium |
| 32 | Deux Pièces pour Harmonium |
| 33 | Pièces dans différents styles pour orgue, livraison 9 |
| 34 | Marche Triomphale pour Harmonium et Piano duo |
| 35 | Mazurka de Salon pour Harmonium |
| 36 | Scherzo Capriccioso pour Harmonium et Piano duo |
| 37 | O Salutaris pour Basse ou Baryton et Orgue |
| 38 | Idylle pour Piano |
| 39 | L'Organiste Pratique pour Harmonium, livraison 1 |
| 40 | Pièces dans différents styles pour orgue, livraison 10 |
| 41 | L'Organiste Pratique pour Harmonium, livraison 2 |
| 42 | Sonate No. 1/Symphonie No. 1 pour Orgue (et Orchestre) |
| 43 | Fantaisie sur deux Mélodie Anglaises pour Orgue |
| 44 | Pièces dans différents styles pour orgue, livraison 11 |
| 45 | Pièces dans différents styles pour orgue, livraison 12 |
| 46 | L'Organiste Pratique pour Harmonium, livraison 3 |
| 47 | L'Organiste Pratique pour Harmonium, livraison 4 |
| 48 | Six petites pièces pour Piano réunies |
| 49 | L'Organiste Pratique pour Harmonium, livraison 5 |
| 50 | L'Organiste Pratique pour Harmonium, livraison 6 (Seconde Sonate pour Grand Orgue) |
| 51 | Balthazar: Scène Lyrique |
| 52 | L'Organiste Pratique pour Harmonium, livraison 7 |
| 53 | Symphonie-Cantate Ariane |
| 54 | Cantate en l’honneur de Frédéric Sauvage pour Choeur et Orchestre |
| 55 | L'Organiste Pratique pour Harmonium, livraison 8 |
| 56 | L'Organiste Pratique pour Harmonium, livraison 9 (Troisième Sonate pour Grand Orgue) |
| 57 | L'Organiste Pratique pour Harmonium, livraison 10 |
| 58 | L'Organiste Pratique pour Harmonium, livraison 11 |
| 59 | L'Organiste Pratique pour Harmonium, livraison 12 |
| 60 | Noëls pour Harmonium ou Orgue (4 livraisons) |
| 61 | Quatrième Sonate pour Harmonium ou Grand Orgue |
| 62 | Couronnement de Notre-Dame de Boulogne-sur-Mer pour Choeur et Orchestre |
| 63 | Méditation sur le Stabat Mater pour Orgue et Orchestre |
| 64 | Christus Vincit pour Choeur et Orgue |
| 65 | L'Organiste Liturgiste pour Orgue ou Harmonium (10 livraisons) |
| 66 | Ecce Panis pour Choeur et Orgue |
| 67 | Deux Romances sans Paroles pour Violoncello ou Violon et Piano |
| 68 | 60 Interludes dans la tonalité Grégorienne pour Orgue ou Harmonium |
| 69 | Pièces dans différents styles pour orgue, livraison 13 |
| 70 | Pièces dans différents styles pour orgue, livraison 14 |
| 71 | Pièces dans différents styles pour orgue, livraison 15 |
| 72 | Pièces dans différents styles pour orgue, livraison 16 |
| 73 | Pie Jesu pour Baryton et Choeur |
| 74 | Pièces dans différents styles pour orgue, livraison 17 |
| 75 | Pièces dans différents styles pour orgue, livraison 18 |
| 77 | Sept pièces for organ |
| 78 | Berceuse (Elegie) pour Flûte et Piano |
| 79 | Berceuse pour Flûte ou Violon et Piano |
| 80 | Sonate No. 5 pour Grand Orgue |
| 81 | Allegro pour Orgue et Orchestre |
| 82 | Two pieces for organ |
| 83 | Final alla Schumann pour Orgue et Orchestre |
| 84 | Grand Choeur en forme de Marche pour Grand Orgue |
| 85 | Romance sans Paroles pour Flute et Piano |
| 86 | Sonate No. 6 pour Grand Orgue |
| 87 | Offertoire sur le commun des confesseurs non pontifes |
| 88 | Morceau Symphonique pour Trombone et Piano |
| 89 | Sonate No. 7 (Suite) pour Grand Orgue, dédié à Monsieur Charles Galloway |
| 90 | 18 Pièces Nouvelles pour Orgue (7 livraisons) |
| 91 | Sonate No. 8/Symphonie No. 2 pour Grand Orgue/Orgue et Orchestre |
| 92 | Voluntary for the Organ |
| 93 | Chorals et Noëls pour Orgue |
| 94 | Trois Oraisons pour Orgue |
