= List of compositions by Louis Vierne =

Below is a sortable list of compositions by Louis Vierne. The works are categorized by genre, opus number, date of composition and titles.

Op.	French title (original title)	English title	Date	Genre	Instrumentation	Notes
24	Symphonie en la mineur	Symphony in A minor	1907–08	Orchestral	for orchestra	
50	Poème	Poème	1925–26	Concertante	for piano and orchestra	
52	Ballade	Ballade	1926	Concertante	for violin and orchestra	
	Pièce symphonique	Symphonic Piece	1926	Concertante	for organ and orchestra	adapted from Organ Symphonies Nos. 1–3
5	Deux pièces: 1. Le soir 2. Légende	Two Pieces: 1. Evening; 2. Legend	1894–95	Chamber	for viola or cello and piano	
6	Largo et Canzonetta	Largo and Canzonetta	1894?	Chamber	for oboe and piano	
12	Quatour à cordes en ré mineur	String Quartet in D minor	1894	Chamber	for 2 violins, viola and cello	
23	Sonate en sol mineur	Sonata in G minor	1905–06	Chamber	for violin and piano	
25	Rhapsodie en sol bémol majeur	Rhapsody in G♭ major	1909	Chamber	for harp	
27	Sonate en si mineur	Sonata in B minor	1910	Chamber	for cello and piano	
42	Quintette en ut mineur pour piano et cordes	Piano Quintet in C minor	1917–18	Chamber	for 2 violins, viola, cello and piano	
46	Marche triomphale pour le centenaire de Napoléon Ier	Triumphal March for the Centenary of Napoleon I	1921	Chamber	for 3 trumpets, 3 trombones, timpani and organ	
56	Soirs étrangers: 1. Grenade; 2. Sur le Léman; 3. Venise; 4. Steppe Canadien; 5. Poissons chinois	Evenings Abroad: 1. Grenada; 2. On Lake Léman; 3. Venice; 4. Canadian Steppe; 5. Goldfish	1928	Chamber	for cello and piano	
1	Allegretto	Allegretto in B minor	1894	Organ	for organ	
	Verset fugué sur "In exitu Israel"	Verset fugué sur "In exitu Israel"	1894	Organ	for organ	
4	Prélude funèbre	Prélude funèbre in C minor	1896	Organ	for organ	
8	Communion	Communion	1899	Organ	for organ	
14	Première symphonie pour grand orgue: 1. Prélude; 2. Fugue; 3. Pastorale; 4. Allegro vivace 5. Andante; 6. Final	Organ Symphony No. 1 in D minor: 1. Prelude; 2. Fugue; 3. Pastorale; 4. Allegro vivace 5. Andante; 6. Final	1898–99	Organ	for organ	dedicated to Alexandre Guilmant
20	Deuxième symphonie pour grand orgue: 1. Allegro; 2. Choral; 3. Scherzo; 4. Cantabile; 5. Final	Organ Symphony No. 2 in E minor: 1. Allegro; 2. Choral; 3. Scherzo; 4. Cantabile; 5. Final	1902–03	Organ	for organ	
28	Troisième symphonie pour grand orgue: 1. Allegro maestoso 2. Cantilène; 3. Intermezzo; 4. Adagio; 5. Final	Organ Symphony No. 3 in F♯ minor: 1. Allegro maestoso 2. Cantilena; 3. Intermezzo; 4. Adagio; 5. Final	1911	Organ	for organ or harmonium	dedicated to Marcel Dupré
30	Messe basse: 1. Entrée; 2. Introit; 3. Offertoire; 4. Élévation; 5. Communion; 6. Sortie	Low Mass	1912	Organ	for organ or harmonium	
31	Vingt-quatre pièces en style libre: 1. Préambule; 2. Cortège; 3. Complainte; 4. Épitaphe; 5. Prélude; 6. Canon; 7. Méditation; 8. Idylle mélancolique 9. Madrigal; 10. Rêverie; 11. Divertissement; 12. Canzona; 13. Légende; 14. Scherzetto; 15. Arabesque; 16. Choral; 17. Lied; 18. Marche funèbre 19. Berceuse; 20. Pastorale; 21. Carillon; 22. Élégie; 23. Épithalame; 24. Postlude	24 Pieces in Free Style	1913–14	Organ	for organ or harmonium	
32	Quatrième symphonie pour grand orgue: 1. Prélude; 2. Allegro; 3. Menuet; 4. Romance; 5. Final	Organ Symphony No. 4 in G minor: 1. Prelude; 2. Allegro; 3. Minuet; 4. Romance; 5. Final	1914	Organ	for organ	
	Prélude en fa dièse mineur	Prélude in F♯ minor	1914	Organ	for organ	
47	Cinqième symphonie pour grand orgue: 1. Grave; 2. Allegro molto marcato 3. Tempo di scherzo ma non troppo vivo 4. Larghetto; 5. Final	Organ Symphony No. 5 in A minor: 1. Grave; 2. Allegro molto marcato 3. Tempo di scherzo ma non troppo vivo 4. Larghetto; 5. Final	1923–24	Organ	for organ	dedicated to Joseph Bonnet
51	24 Pièces de fantaisie: Première Suite: 1. Prélude; 2. Andantino; 3. Caprice; 4. Intermezzo; 5. Requiem aeternam 6. Marche nuptiale	24 Fantasy Pieces: Suite No. 1	1926	Organ	for organ	
53	24 Pièces de fantaisie: Deuxième Suite: 1. Lamento; 2. Sicilienne; 3. Hymne au soleil 4. Feux follets 5. Clair de lune 6. Toccata	24 Fantasy Pieces: Suite No. 2	1926	Organ	for organ	
54	24 Pièces de fantaisie: Troisième Suite: 1. Dédicace; 2. Impromptu; 3. Étoile du soir 4. Fantômes; 5. Sur le Rhin; 6. Carillon de Westminster	24 Fantasy Pieces: Suite No. 3	1927	Organ	for organ	Vierne dedicated Dédicace to Rodman Wanamaker of the Wanamaker Organ.
55	24 Pièces de fantaisie: Quatrième Suite: 1. Aubade; 2. Résignation; 3. Cathédrales; 4. Naïades; 5. Gargouilles et Chimères; 6. Les cloches de Hinckley	24 Fantasy Pieces: Suite No. 4	1927	Organ	for organ	
	Trois improvisations: 1. Marche épiscopale 2. Méditation; 3. Cortège	3 Improvisations	1928	Organ	for organ	live performance by Vierne recorded at Notre Dame de Paris Cathedral in November 1928; transcribed by Maurice Duruflé (1954) from the recording
58	Triptyque: 1. Matines; 2. Communion; 3. Stèle pour un enfant défunt	Triptyque	1929–31	Organ	for organ	
59	Sixième symphonie pour grand orgue: 1. Introduction et Allegro; 2. Aria; 3. Scherzo; 4. Adagio; 5. Final	Organ Symphony No. 6 in B minor: 1. Introduction and Allegro; 2. Aria; 3. Scherzo; 4. Adagio; 5. Final	1930	Organ	for organ	dedicated to Lynnwood Farnam
62	Messe basse pour les défunts: 1. Prélude; 2. Introit; 3. Offertoire; 4. Élévation; 5. Communion; 6. Défilé	Low Mass of the Dead	1934	Organ	for organ or harmonium	
7	Deux pièces: 1. Impression d'automne 2. Intermezzo	2 Pieces: 1. Autumn Impression; 2. Intermezzo	1895	Piano	for piano	
9	Feuillets d'album: 1. Matin d'été 2. Contemplation; 3. La mer et la nuit 4. Nuit étoilée 5. Coup de vent 6. Le vieux berger 7. La valse 8. Dans le bois 9. Chanson des faucheurs	Album Leaves		Piano	for piano	manuscript lost
17	Suite bourguignonne: 1. Aubade; 2. Idylle; 3. Divertissement; 4. Légende bourguignonne 5. À l'angélus du soir 6. Danse rustique 7. Clair de lune	Burgundian Suite	1899	Piano	for piano	
34	Trois nocturnes: 1. La nuit avait envahi la nef de la cathédrale...; 2. Au splendide mois de mai, lorsque les bourgeons rompaient l'écorce...; 3. La lumière rayonnait des astres de la nuit, le rossignol chantait...	3 Nocturnes	1915–16	Piano	for piano	
36	Douze préludes: 1. Prologue; 2. Tendresse; 3. Pressentiment; 4. Souvenir d'un jour de joie 5. Nostalgie; 6. Par gros temps 7. Évocation d'un jour d'angoisse 8. Dans la nuit 9. Suprême appel 10. Sur une tombe 11. Adieu; 12. Seul	12 Preludes	1914–15	Piano	for piano	
39	Poème des cloches funèbres: 1. Cloches dans le cauchemar 2. Le glas	Poem of the Funeral Bells	1916	Piano	for piano	1. manuscript lost
43	Silhouettes d'enfants: 1. Valse; 2. Chanson; 3. Divertissement; 4. Barcarolle; 5. Gavotte dans le style ancien	Children's Silhouettes	1916	Piano	for piano	
44	Solitude: 1. Hantise; 2. Nuit blanche 3. Vision hallucinante 4. La ronde fantastique des revenants	Loneliness	1918	Piano	for piano	
49	Ainsi parlait Zarathoustra, Poème	Thus Spake Zarathustra	1922	Piano	for piano	Poem after Friedrich Nietzsche; incomplete
16	Messe solennelle en ut dièse mineur	High Mass in C♯ minor	1899	Choral	for 4 voices and 2 organs	
22	Praxinoë, Princesse d'Egypte, Légende lyrique	Praxinoë, Princess of Egypt	1903–05	Choral	for soloists, choir and orchestra	Légende lyrique; libretto by Ambroise Colin
2	Tantum ergo	Tantum ergo	1891	Vocal	for 1 voice or 4 voices	
3	Ave Maria	Ave Maria	c.1890	Vocal	for voice and organ	
10	2 Mélodies: 1. À Elle; 2. En Prison	2 Songs	1895	Vocal	for voice and piano	manuscript lost 1. words by P. Gobillard; 2. words by Paul Verlaine
11	3 Mélodies: 1. Beaux papillons blancs 2. Donc ce sera par un clair soir d'été 3. Qu'as-tu fait de ta jeunesse?	3 Songs	1896	Vocal	for voice and piano	1. words by Théophile Gautier; 2. words by Paul Verlaine; 3. words by Paul Verlaine
13	3 Mélodies: 1. Chanson d'automne 2. Lied d'amour 3. Extase	3 Songs	1899	Vocal	for voice and piano	1. words by Paul Verlaine; 2. words by Carly Timun; 3. words by Victor Hugo
18	3 Mélodies: 1. L'heure du berger 2. Ô triste, triste était mon âme!; 3. Le Rouet	3 Songs	1897	Vocal	for voice and piano	1. words by Paul Verlaine; 2. words by Paul Verlaine; 3. words by Leconte de Lisle
19	Dors, chère Prunelle	Sleep, Dear Prunelle	1898	Vocal	for voice and piano	words by Catulle Mendès
21				Vocal		manuscript lost; possibly 3 Motets or 3 Mélodies
26	3 Mélodies: 1. Soleils couchants 2. Nox; 3. Adieu	3 Songs	1903	Vocal	for voice and piano	1. words by Paul Verlaine; 2. words by Leconte de Lisle; 3. words by Auguste Villiers de l'Isle-Adam
29	Stances d'amour et de rêve: 1. Les Chaînes; 2. Chanson de mer 3. À l'hirondelle 4. Ressemblance; 5. Le Galop	Stanzas of Love and Dreams	1912	Vocal	for voice and piano	words by Sully Prudhomme
33	Psyché	Psyché	1914	Vocal	for soprano and orchestra (or piano)	Symphonic Poem; words by Victor Hugo
35	Les djinns	Les djinns	1912	Vocal	for soprano and orchestra	Symphonic Poem
37	Éros	Éros	1916	Vocal	for soprano and orchestra	Symphonic Poem; words by Comtesse de Noailles
38	Spleens et détresses: 1. Dans l'interminable ennui de la plaine 2. Un grand sommeil noir 3. Spleens; 4. Promenade sentimentale 5. À une femme 6. Sérénade; 7. Le son du cor 8. Sapho; 9. Les faux beaux jour 10. Marine	Spleen and Distress	1916	Vocal	for soprano and piano or orchestra	words by Paul Verlaine
40	Romance	Romance	1907	Vocal	for voice and piano	Vocalise
41	Dal vertice	Dal vertice	1917	Vocal	for tenor and orchestra (or piano)	Ode lyrique; words by Gabriele d'Annunzio
45	Cinq poèmes de Baudelaire: 1. Recueillement; 2. Réversibilité; 3. Le Flambeau vivant 4. La Cloche fêlée 5. Les Hiboux	5 Poems of Baudelaire: 1. Meditation; 2. Reversibility; 3. The Living Torch; 4. The Cracked Bell; 5. The Owls	1919	Vocal	for soprano and piano	words by Charles Baudelaire
48	Poème de l'amour I. Floréal: 1. Le Jour où je vous vis 2. Au jardin d mon cœur 3. Le Bateau rose; II. Thermidor: 1. Donne-moi tes baisers 2. Le Trésor; 3. Rondeaux mignons 4. Abdications; III. Brumaire: 1. Sonnet d'automne 2. Les Sorcières; 3. Air retrouvé 4. Le Bateau noir; IV. Nivôse: 1. Jour d'hiver 2. Souvenir; 3. Angoisse; 4. Sombres plaisirs	Love Poem	1924	Vocal	for voice and piano	15 Songs; words by Jean Richepin
57	Les Angélus: 1. Au Matin; 2. À Midi; 3. Au Soir	Les Angélus	1930–31	Vocal	for voice and organ (or orchestra)	
60	Quatre poèmes grecs: 1. Offrande à Pan; 2. Le Repos; 3. Offrande à Kypris; 4. Chanson pour Avril	4 Greek Poems: 1. Offering to Pan; 2. Peace; 3. Offering to Kypris; 4. April's Song	1930	Vocal	for soprano and harp or piano	words by Comtesse de Noailles
61	La ballade du désespéré	The Ballad of Despair	1931	Vocal	for tenor and orchestra (or piano)	Poème lyrique
	Les roses blanches de la lune	The White Roses of the Moon		Vocal	for voice and piano	words by Jean Richepin

== Sources ==
- Catalogue of Vierne's Works Compiled by Bernard Gavoty
