= Pièces de fantaisie =

- Suites Nos. 1-4 for organ
- by Louis Vierne
- Opus: 51, 53, 54, & 55
- Year: 1926-1927
- Publisher: Henri Lemoine & Cie
- Movements: 24
- Scoring: Solo organ

The Pièces de fantaisie, Opp. 51, 53, 54 & 55 (from French, Fantasy Pieces) is the title given to four different suites for solo organ by French composer and organist Louis Vierne. Written between 1926 and 1927, the four suites are usually treated as a single cycle of 24 pieces.

== Background ==
=== Suite No. 1, Op. 51 ===
Vierne wrote the manuscript of the first suite in Dinard, in August-September, and in Paris, in December 1926. It was premiered on February 4, 1927, even though some titles would be changed for the published version. The premiere took place in the auditorium of the New York Wanamaker department store. Vierne only performed the set in four of the 34 documented recitals he gave in America, but he played it in full every time. The composer himself is known to have recorded the "Andantino" in December 1928, together with some improvisations, at Notre-Dame de Paris. The suite was published by Henri Lemoine & Cie in 1926.

=== Suite No. 2, Op. 53 ===
The second suite was composed along with the first, between the months of August and December 1926. It was published upon Vierne's return from America, in May 1927. Many of these pieces are dedicated to people linked in one way or another to organ playing in the United States. The suite was published by Henri Lemoine & Cie in 1927.

=== Suite No. 3, Op. 54 ===
Vierne wrote his third suite after his return from the 1927 United States tour, in July and August 1927, in Luchon. The individual pieces in this set were never formally premiered, but they were included in different recitals around 1927 and 1928. The dedicatees of these pieces include Rodman Wanamaker, the son of the founder of the department stores that welcomed the premiere of his first suite, and André Marchal, to whom Vierne sent a letter asking for his approval to dedicate his "Impromptu" to him. Marchal went on to premiere it in June 1928, on a program of the Société Nationale, and recorded it twenty years later at Saint-Eustache.

I just finished my 24 Pièces de Fantaisie . . . I took the liberty of putting your name at the top of one of them [the Impromptu]. Do you accept the dedication? In doing this I wanted first to express my highest admiration of your great talent, then, to recognize by an abiding homage the extreme kindness with which you have always supported my music and myself whenever you could. Above all, I am sensitive to loyalty.

— Louis Vierne, letter of September 9, 1927 to André Marchal

This suite also includes "Carillon de Westminster", arguably the best-known work from the set. which was premiered on November 29, 1927, in Notre Dame. It received a more formal premiered eight days later in a recital in Saint-Nicolas-du-Chardonnet. The Carillon is famous for featuring the "Westminster Quarters", the sound of the Big Ben bells. The suite was published by Henri Lemoine & Cie in 1927.

=== Suite No. 4, Op. 55 ===
As in the case of the third suite, the fourth suite was also composed in Luchon during July and August 1927. There is little information about its premiere. It was published by Henri Lemoine & Cie in 1927.

== Structure ==
The complete collection of pieces is divided into four suites with six pieces each. It is scored for solo organ.

Pieces de fantaisie
Suite No.	Piece No.	Title	Key	Tempo marking	Dedication
Suite No. 1, Op. 51	I	Prélude	C major	Moderato	to my friend A. Convers
Suite No. 1, Op. 51	II	Andantino	A minor	Adagio	to my student the Count of Saint-Martin
Suite No. 1, Op. 51	III	Caprice	D minor	Allegretto	to my student Henri Nibelle
Suite No. 1, Op. 51	IV	Intermezzo	F major	Allegro ma non troppo vivo	to my student Ludovic Panel
Suite No. 1, Op. 51	V	Requiem æternam	G minor	Lento ma non troppo – Poco più lento	to the memory of my brother Édouard Vierne
Suite No. 1, Op. 51	VI	Marche nuptiale	B♭ major	Allegro maestoso e marcato	to my student Mademoiselle Louise Neymarck
Suite No. 2, Op. 53	I	Lamento	C minor	Adagio quasi larghetto	to my friend Monsieur Bingham, organist in New York (U.S.A.)
Suite No. 2, Op. 53	II	Sicilienne	E minor	Allegretto moderato	to my friend Monsieur Zeuch, organist in Boston (U.S.A.)
Suite No. 2, Op. 53	III	Hymne au soleil	G major	Maestoso	to my student Madame Ruth M. Conniston, organist in New York
Suite No. 2, Op. 53	IV	Feux follets	B minor	Vivace	to my friend Charles Courbouin, organist of the Wanamaker Auditorium in Philadelphia (U.S.A.)
Suite No. 2, Op. 53	V	Clair de lune	D♭ major	Adagio molto espressivo	to my friend Ernest Skinner, organ maker in Boston (U.S.A.)
Suite No. 2, Op. 53	VI	Toccata	B♭ minor	Allegro risoluto	to my friend, Dr. Alexandre Russell, professor at Princeton University (U.S.A.)
Suite No. 3, Op. 54	I	Dédicace	A♭ major	Andantino espressivo	to Monsieur Rodman Wanamaker
Suite No. 3, Op. 54	II	Impromptu	F minor	Vivace – Molto cantabile	to André Marchal, organist of Saint-Germain-des-Prés in Paris
Suite No. 3, Op. 54	III	Étoile du soir	G♯ minor	Moderato non troppo lento	to my student Mademoiselle Yolande de Noailles
Suite No. 3, Op. 54	IV	Fantômes	C♯ minor	Grave – Allegro più mosso – Grave	to my student Pierre Auvray
Suite No. 3, Op. 54	V	Sur le Rhin	E♭ minor	Molto maestoso – Poco più vivo – Tempo I	to my friend Paul de Maleingreau, organ professor at the Conservatoire Royal in Brussels
Suite No. 3, Op. 54	VI	Carillon de Westminster	D major	Andante con moto	to my friend Henry Willis, organ maker in London
Suite No. 4, Op. 55	I	Aubade	E♭ major	Allegretto	to my friend Monsieur R. [H.] Matthias Turton, organist and chorus master in Montréal (Canada)
Suite No. 4, Op. 55	II	Résignation	F♯ major	Adagio molto sostenuto	to my student Henri Gagnebin, director of the Conservatoire de Genève
Suite No. 4, Op. 55	III	Cathédrales	A major	Largo molto sostenuto	to my student Edward Shippen Barnes, organist to Philadelphia (U.S.A.)
Suite No. 4, Op. 55	IV	Naïades	B major	Allegro non troppo vivo	to my student Madame Charles Louis-Dreyfus
Suite No. 4, Op. 55	V	Gargouilles et Chimères	F♯ minor	Poco lento – Allegretto con moto – Poco lento – Allegretto marcato – Poco lento – Allegretto con moto	to my student Georges Ibos, organist of Saint Honoré d'Eylau in Paris
Suite No. 4, Op. 55	VI	Les Cloches de Hinckley	E major	Andante con moto, quasi allegro – Allegro molto marcato	to my friend J. W. Iberson Esq., organist in Sheffield
