= Trois improvisations =

- by Louis Vierne
- Year: 1932
- Performed: 1932 - Paris
- Duration: 11 minutes approx.
- Movements: 3
- Scoring: Solo organ

Trois improvisations (from French, Three improvisations) are a series of improvisations recorded by French organist and composer Louis Vierne in 1928.

== Background ==
Louis Vierne's recorded improvisations were constrained by the limitations in size of the 78 rpm format, which allowed only about three to three and a half minutes per side on a 10-inch disc and roughly four and a half minutes on a 12-inch disc. According to Madeleine Richepin, who was present at the recording session, the composer complained about the allowable length being too short by saying: "“What? Three minutes, thirty seconds per side? What do you want me to do in three and a half minutes? Oh, well, some pompous, Republican marches will do." Consequently, the Marche left one minute and twelve seconds of disc time unused; the Cortège left one minute and ten seconds; the Méditation, the longest of the three, had a duration of three minutes and fifty seconds, still leaving around forty seconds free.

Vierne recorded these three improvisations at the 1858 Cavaillé-Coll grand organ located in Notre Dame in Paris, in December 1928. It is doubtful he ever wrote them down prior to recording them. The matrices of those recordings were kept by Odeon, and circulation became rare since then.

=== Reconstruction ===
On April 1, 1953, many years after the composer's death, French organist and composer Maurice Duruflé obtained a copy of the recordings thanks to the ORTF, which produced several discs from the original copy owned by Odeon. After listening to the improvisations, Duruflé became captivated by them: "It's rapture! This music puts you in a euphoric state that you can't imagine... What tender emotion, what sweet melancholy in the Méditation." At the request of Madeleine Mallet-Richepin, Vierne's lifelong patron and companion, Duruflé transcribed the three pieces and published them in 1954, under Éditions Durand. Since then, others have made new transcriptions of the piece, including the Croatian-German organist Danijel Drilo in 2015.

Duruflé premiered the three works on April 5, 1954, at Sainte-Clotilde, Paris, in a recital sponsored by Les Amis de l'Orgue. The recordings were preserved and only remastered on 33⅓-rpm long-playing discs by Odeon in 1959 and EMI in 1981. Two of these improvisations (Marche épiscopale and Cortège) were later reissued in 1993 by EMI Classics as part of their "Composers in Person" series.

== Structure ==
The three improvisations have a total duration of around 11 minutes. The movement list is as follows:

1. Marche épiscopale
2. Méditation
3. Cortège

== Reception ==
At the time, opinions on Vierne's improvisations were mixed. Many of his contemporaries shared the common belief that Vierne's improvisation skills had gone down in the years prior to this set. Jean-Pierre Mazeirat stated that those who had known Vierne personally believed the recordings did not resemble his usual manner of improvising. André Fleury went further and said that "Vierne improvised correctly, but all those who heard him before the War of 1914-18 said that he was extraordinary. After the war, he always tended to do pretty much the same thing. Every Sunday it was the same registration." This view was also shared by Albert Schweitzer and Vierne's own student Henri Doyen. On a more negative note, American organist Ernest Douglas said Vierne's improvisation was "disappointing in that [it] lacked the sparkling brilliancy one naturally expected from the nature of his own organ works.", even though he remarked he improvised with mastery.

On the other hand, a long list of musicians and musicologists, particularly Conrad Bernier, Norbert Dufourcq, Maurice Duruflé, Bernard Gavoty, and Jean Langlais, emphasized the fact that his improvisation at Notre Dame was closer to the style he employed when composing his symphonic output. Gavoty explicitly specified that Vierne improvised in the style of his Sixth Symphony. American organist George Huntington Byles argued that, when compared to Marcel Dupré, Vierne's improvisations "had a great deal more musical depth; they were more moving—while Dupré's were sometimes rather more breathtaking," as "in those days Dupré went in for some breathtaking pyrotechnics, which Vierne did not quite ever do."
