= List of symphonies in A minor =

This is a list of symphonies in A minor written by notable composers.

Composer	Symphony
Hugo Alfvén	Symphony No. 5, Op. 54 (1942, 1952/3)
Kurt Atterberg	Symphony No. 7 "Sinfonia Romantica", Op.45 (1941-2)
Victor Bendix	Symphony No. 3, Op. 25 (1895)
Arrigo Boito	Symphony
Alexander Borodin	Symphony No. 3 (sketched between 1884-7 but left incomplete, first two movements finished and orchestrated by Alexander Glazunov)
Havergal Brian	Symphony No. 9 (1951); Symphony No. 25 (1965–66)
Stephen Brown	Symphony, The Northern Journey
Samuel Coleridge-Taylor	Symphony, Op. 8 (1896)
Johann Nepomuk David	Symphony No. 1, Op. 18 (1937)
Carl Ditters von Dittersdorf	Symphony "Il delirio delli compositori, ossia Il gusto d'oggidi" (1770s)
Thomas Dunhill	Symphony, Op. 48 (1914–16)
Johann Friedrich Fasch	Symphony Fwv M:a 1
Eduard Franck	Symphony (1846 – lost)
Niels Gade	Symphony No. 3, Op. 15 (1847)
Edward German	Symphony No. 2 "Norwich" (1893)
Evgeny Golubev	Symphony No. 5, Op. 45 (1960)
Alexander Gretchaninov	Symphony No. 2, Op. 27 "Pastoral" (1908)
Howard Hanson	Symphony No. 3, Op. 33 (1937)
Alfred Hill	Symphony No. 5 "Carnival" (1955, arrangement of a string quartet from 1912); Symphony No. 13 for Strings (1959)
Vincent d'Indy	Symphony No. 1 (1872)
Mykola Kolessa	Symphony No. 2 (1966)
George Lloyd	Symphony No. 1 (1932)
George Alexander Macfarren	Symphony No. 5 (1833)
Gustav Mahler	Symphony No. 6 (1903-4, revised 1906-8)
John Blackwood McEwen	Symphony (1898)
Erkki Melartin	Symphony No. 5 "Sinfonia Brevis", Op. 90 (1915)
Felix Mendelssohn	Symphony No. 3, Op. 56, "Scottish"
Alexander Mosolov	Symphony No. 5 (1959–60)
Alexander Moyzes	Symphony No. 2, Op. 16 (1932, revised 1941)
Wolfgang Amadeus Mozart	Symphony "Odense" K. Anh 220 (16a) (1765?)
Nikolai Myaskovsky	Symphony No. 3, Op. 15 (1914); Symphony No. 23 "Symphony-Suite on Kabardanian Themes", Op. 56 (1941)
Arvo Pärt	Symphony No. 4 (2008)
Gavriil Popov	Symphony No. 2 "Motherland", Op.39 (1943)
Sergei Rachmaninoff	Symphony No. 3, Op. 44 (1935–36)
Joachim Raff	Symphony No. 11, Op. 214 "Winter" (1876, edited and published by Max Erdmannsdörfer in 1883)
Ferdinand Ries	Symphony No. 7, Op. 181 (1835)
Jean Rivier	Symphony No. 5 (1950)
Julius Röntgen	Symphony (1931)
Guy Ropartz	Symphonie sur un Choral Breton. (1894-5)
Anton Rubinstein	Symphony No. 6, Op. 111 (1886)
Camille Saint-Saëns	Symphony No. 2, Op. 55 (1859)
Vadim Salmanov	Symphony No. 3 (1963)
Bernhard Scholz	Symphony No. 2, Op. 80 (published 1896)
Franz Schreker	Symphony, Op. 1
Cyril Scott	Symphony No. 2, Op. 22 (1903)
Jean Sibelius	Symphony No. 4, Op. 63 (1909–11)
Alice Mary Smith	Symphony in A minor (probably 1876)
Alexandre Tansman	Symphony No. 2 (1926)
Randall Thompson	Symphony No. 3
Johann Baptist Wanhal	Symphony Bryan a1; Symphony Bryan a2 (1770s)
Sergei Vasilenko	Symphony No. 5, Op. 123 (1947)
Louis Vierne	Symphony in A minor, Op. 24 (1907-08); Organ Symphony No. 5, Op. 47 (1923-4)
Karl Weigl	Symphony No. 6 (1947)
Mieczysław Weinberg	Symphony No. 4, Op. 61 (1957, rev 1961); Symphony No. 6, Op. 79 (1962–63); Symphony No. 10, Op. 98 (1968)
