= Symphony in A =

Symphony in A can refer to:

- List of symphonies in A minor
- List of symphonies in A major

== See also ==
- List of symphonies by key
