= Piet Kee =

Dutch musician (1927–2018)

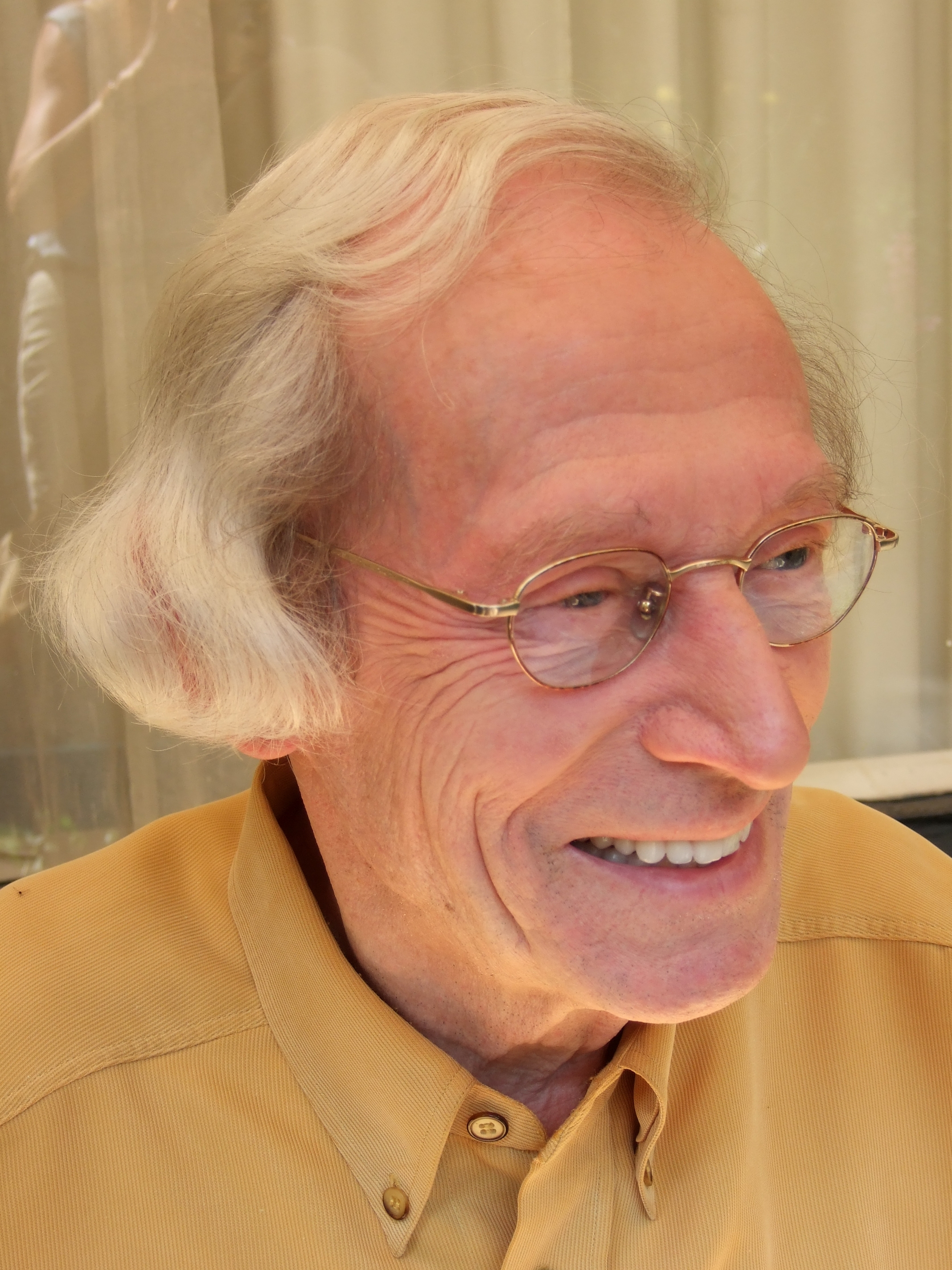
Piet Kee

Pieter William Kee (30 August 1927 – 25 May 2018) was a Dutch organist and composer.

== Biography ==
Born in Zaandam, Netherlands, Kee studied organ, piano and composition at the Amsterdam Conservatory, obtaining the Prix d'Excellence, and won first prize at the annual Haarlem International Improvisation Competition three times in succession (1953 to 1955). This was the start of a worldwide career as a concert organist.

Kee taught at the Music Lyceum and Sweelinck Conservatory in Amsterdam from 1954 until 1988, and at the Haarlem International Summer Academy for Organists. He was organist of the Hagerbeer-Schnitger organ in St. Laurens church in Alkmaar from 1952 to 1987, and city organist of the world-famous Müller organ at St. Bavo church in Haarlem from 1956 until 1989.

Kee's improvisation skills were renowned. His compositions include "Haarlem Concerto", which received its first performance by Thomas Trotter in March 2006. His numerous recordings, several of which received awards, include a series of CDs on the Chandos label, covering the repertoire from Sweelinck to Messiaen, recorded on important European historical instruments.

In 1988, with Olivier Messiaen, Kee received an Honorary Fellowship from the Royal College of Organists.

In February 2014, several of Kee's compositions were performed in a "Composer's Portrait" concert at the Orgelpark in Amsterdam. This included a version of The Organ for five pipe organs.

Kee died in Haarlem at the age of 90.

== Compositions ==
The list below is selective. Publishers include Bärenreiter-Verlag (BA), Donemus (D), Harmonia (H), Hinrichsen/Peters (HP) and Boeijenga Music Publications (BO).

Recent compositions (see further below for details) include:

- Organ and panpipes – Magic Pipes. Premiered on September 11, 2012 in St Bavo, with Matthijs Koene panpipes, and Jos van der Kooy organ. The piece was performed by the same artists at Bogazici University, Istanbul in November 2012.
- Carillon – Kampanella.
- Organ and Alto Saxophone(s) – Performance.
- Organ – Three Organ Pieces.

=== Organ ===
- Triptych on Psalm 86 (1960) (HP)
- Two Organ Pieces (1962) (HP)

Fantasia on "Wachet Auf"
Passion Choral

- Four Pieces for Manuals (1966) (BA 8265)

Praeludium
Ciacona
Choral "Aus tiefer Not schrei ich zu dir" on Aus tiefer Not schrei ich zu dir at St. Laurenskerk, Rotterdam)
Epilog

- Intrada for two organs on "Erschienen ist der herrlich Tag" after Nikolaus Herman's hymn (BO)
- Gedenck-Clanck 76 – Ode to Valerius based on 3 Dutch songs (1976) (H)
- Bios – in seven movements (1995) (BA 7651)
- The Organ – inspired by paintings of Pieter Saenredam (2000) (BA 9365)
- Three Organ Pieces (BA 9393)

Seventy Chords – (2008) (originally published in "Essays in Honor of Ewald Kooiman" (BO))
Cervus (Psalm 42) – for organ (or harmonium) (2006)
Voluntary on HSAE (2009)

=== Organ with other instruments ===
- Music and Space – for two organs, three trumpets and two trombones (1969) (D)
- Confrontation – for church organ and three street organs (1979)
- Network – for main organ plus small organ or electronic keyboard, alto saxophone and soprano recorder (1996) (BA 7421)
- Festival Spirit – for main organ and four positiv or box organs, commissioned for performance by jury members of the St. Albans International Organ Festival competition, UK (2001)
- Bios II – for organ, solo violin and percussion (2002)
- Haarlem Concerto – for organ and orchestra (symphonic wind ensemble, an alto and tenor saxophone, double basses, percussion and harmonium) (2006) (D)
- Performance – for alto saxophone and organ (2009) (BA 9392). (A version for twelve saxophones and organ is available by contacting Bärenreiter or the composer.)
- Magic Pipes – for panpipes and organ (2012)

=== Other compositions ===
- The World – a mini oratorio using a text of Henry Vaughan for mixed choir, four vocal soloists (SATB) and ad libitum continuo instrument (1999) (BA 7587)
- Heaven – an echo fantasy using a text of George Herbert for unaccompanied mixed choir and two echo sopranos (2000)
- Frans Hals Suite for carillon (1990) (D)

Luidstuk (Ringing Piece)
Sarabande voor Judith Leyster
Frans Hals Toccata

- Daaaee for carillon (1999)
- Flight – flute solo (1992) (D)
- Opstreek (Up-bow) – for violin and piano (1997)
- Winds – for reed quintet (2000)
- Kampanella for carillon (2011) – composed for the inauguration of the restored Hemony carillon (17th century) in Kampen, Netherlands
- Improvisations – none transcribed, but the improvisation in the final of the 1953 Haarlem Organ Improvisation Competition, a Sonata in three movements, is available for listening from the NCRV archives. The contestants were Paul Barras, Anton Heiller, Piet Kee (winner), Matthieu Prange and Karl Richter.

== Discography ==
Earlier recordings, released since 1954, can be found on the Telefunken, His Master's Voice, Philips and Guild labels. Starting in 1989, Piet Kee made a series of eleven recordings for Chandos Records, including works of Sweelinck, Pachelbel, Bruhns, Buxtehude, Bach, Walther, Mendelssohn, Franck, Alain, Reger, Hindemith, Andriessen and Messiaen on notable European instruments including St. Bavo Haarlem, St. Laurens Alkmaar, Roskilde Cathedral Denmark, Basilika Weingarten, Martini Church Groningen and the Concertgebouw in Amsterdam. Several of these recordings are now available as MP3 downloads.

== Writings ==
- The Secrets of Bach's Passacaglia – Musik und Kirche, 52 (1982) and 53 (1983). Also The Diapason, June, July, August and September 1983.
- Astronomy in Buxtehude's Passacaglia – Ars Organi (1984), Reprinted in Organist's Review, August 2007.
- Number and Symbolism in the Passacaglia and Ciacona – Musik und Kirche, May 1988. Also John Loosemore Association 1988 (ISBN 1-871179-01-7)
- Haydn's Last Symphony: Input from London? – The Musical Times, vol.147 no.1897 (Winter 2006), pp. 57–62

== Recordings of Piet Kee's compositions ==
- Triptych on Psalm 86 – Jos van der Kooy, St. Bavo church, Haarlem, "Orgels in Nederland 2005", box 2, CD no. 8.
- Fantasia on Wachet auf and Choral on Aus tiefer Not – Piet Kee, St. Bavo church, Haarlem, Guild Records LP GRSP 7014, Xenophone CD 885220.
- Gedenck-Clanck 76 – Piet Kee, Sint Laurenskerk Alkmaar, Guild Records LP GRSP 7017, Wisp CD 25962.
- Confrontation – Philips LP 6410 767.
- Frans Hals Suite – Arie Abbenes, Carillon of Domkerk Utrecht, "Dutch Compositions for Carillon", issued by Utrechtse Klokkenspel Vereniging.
- Bell Extravaganza : Ringing Piece from Frans Hals Suite – Adrian Tien, National Carillon Canberra, Move Records MD 3224.
- The Organ – Jos van der Kooy, St. Bavo Haarlem, "New Music for the Müller Organ", Etcetera KTC 1364.
- Cervus (Psalm 42) – Jos van der Kooy, Philharmonie, Haarlem, Tulip Records TURE 185003.
- Intrada for two organs on "Erschienen ist der herrlich Tag" – Bert Lassing and Marco bij de Vaate, Grotekerk, Culemborg.

== Sources ==
- Sadie, S. (ed.) (1980) The New Grove Dictionary of Music & Musicians, vol. 9.
- Philip Sawyer "Piet Kee in conversation" in Organists' Review, May 2008.
