= Organ Symphonies (Vierne) =

Louis Vierne composed six symphonies for the organ in total:

- Organ Symphony No. 1 (Vierne) in D minor
- Organ Symphony No. 2 (Vierne) in E minor
- Organ Symphony No. 3 (Vierne) in F-sharp minor
- Organ Symphony No. 4 (Vierne) in G minor
- Organ Symphony No. 5 (Vierne) in A minor
- Organ Symphony No. 6 (Vierne) in B minor
