= Christine Kamp =

Dutch musician

Christine Kamp (1966 in Strasbourg, France) is a Dutch organist & pianist.

== Biography ==
Christine Kamp studied organ and piano at the Sweelinck Conservatory in Amsterdam, as well as organ, church music, chamber music and lied accompaniment at the Utrecht conservatory. Her organ teachers included Ewald Kooiman, Jacques van Oortmerssen and Jan Raas. Ronald Brautigam and Thom Bollen were among her piano teachers. She attended courses with György Sebők and Marie-Louise Jaquet-Langlais.

Christine Kamp has performed in the Netherlands (e.g. Concertgebouw Amsterdam and Sint-Bavokerk Haarlem), abroad (St. Clotilde, Paris and St. Sernin, Toulouse), and has done recordings for Radio, TV and CD. She gave the first performance and made the world premiere recording of the complete score since 1928 of the Pièce Symphonique by Louis Vierne with the Holland Symfonia Orchestra conducted by Ermanno Florio in 2006.

She has been the organist of the Grote Kerk at Weesp since 1996.

== Discography ==
- Louis Vierne Complete organ works (2CD) Vol.1, 2, 3, 4 (5 not recorded): including complete choral works, transcriptions, organ with chant, brass & orchestra
- Christine Kamp Sauer organ Hermannstadt/Sibiu Romania Vol.1, 2

== Awards ==
In 2002, Christine Kamp was decorated with the Silver Medal of the Société Académique 'Arts Sciences Lettres' in Paris, and in 2008, with the Weesper Cultuurprijs.
