= Ruth Muzzy Conniston Morize =

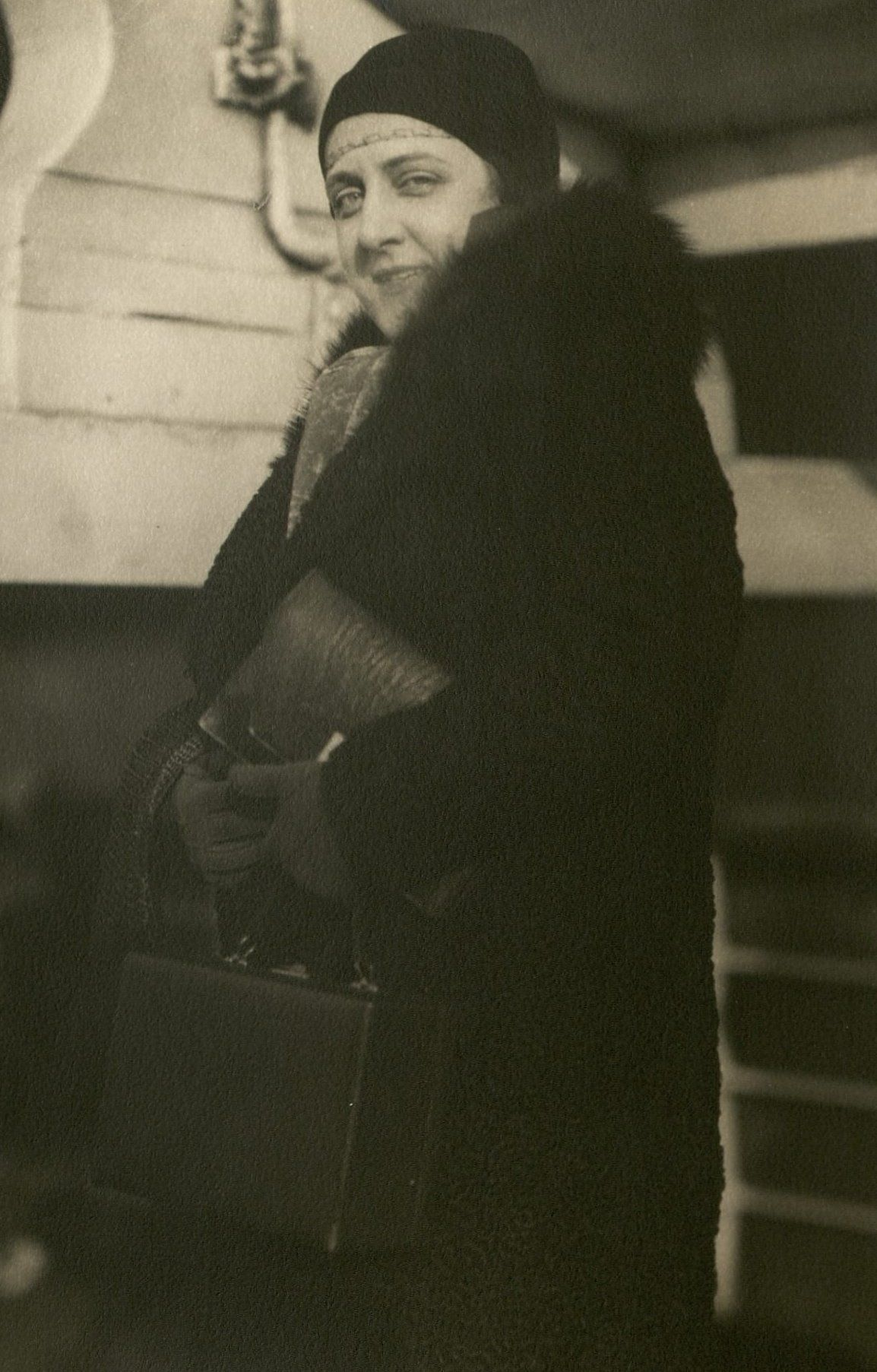
- Born: December 1, 1892; Bristol, Connecticut, US
- Died: October 3, 1952 (aged 59); Paris, France

Ruth Muzzy Conniston Morize (December 1, 1892 – October 3, 1952) was a Boston socialite and musician, and received widespread media attention for her work as a carillonneur.

== Life ==
Ruth Muzzy was born in Bristol, Connecticut, on December 1, 1892, to Arthur George Muzzy and Martha Ellen Thomas Muzzy. She studied music at Yale, receiving a bachelor's degree of music in 1915. Afterward, she studied organ with Louis Vierne in Paris, France.

On January 13, 1918, Ruth married Capt. Philip Conniston in Honolulu, but the marriage ended in 1920 due to his death. She taught music appreciation at Simmons College (now Simmons University) and the New England Conservatory of Music in Boston. In addition to teaching, she volunteered with the Quakers and participated in Boston and New York society. She also published at least two collections of French songs, “Chantons un Peu” and “La Cercle Francais.”

On June 27, 1929, Ruth Conniston married Andre Morize, a noted professor of French literature and culture at Harvard University. While Professor Morize directed the French summer school at Middlebury College, Ruth Morize organized the Music Center in the summer of 1938. The Music Center only ran for three years.

As World War II spread throughout Europe, Ruth Morize helped organize a unit of the Fighting French Relief and volunteered with American Aid to France and the Red Cross.

In 1952, Andre Morize divorced Ruth Morize, citing “unreasonable jealousy.” Ruth Morize challenged the validity of the French divorce, claiming desertion, and requested spousal support. The divorce was followed closely in the news. Additionally, as the case was tried in an American court, it raised the question of whether an American court could adjudicate a divorce from outside its jurisdiction and country. Ultimately, the Suffolk County, Massachusetts court awarded Ruth Morize a $150 monthly stipend from her former husband's American funds.

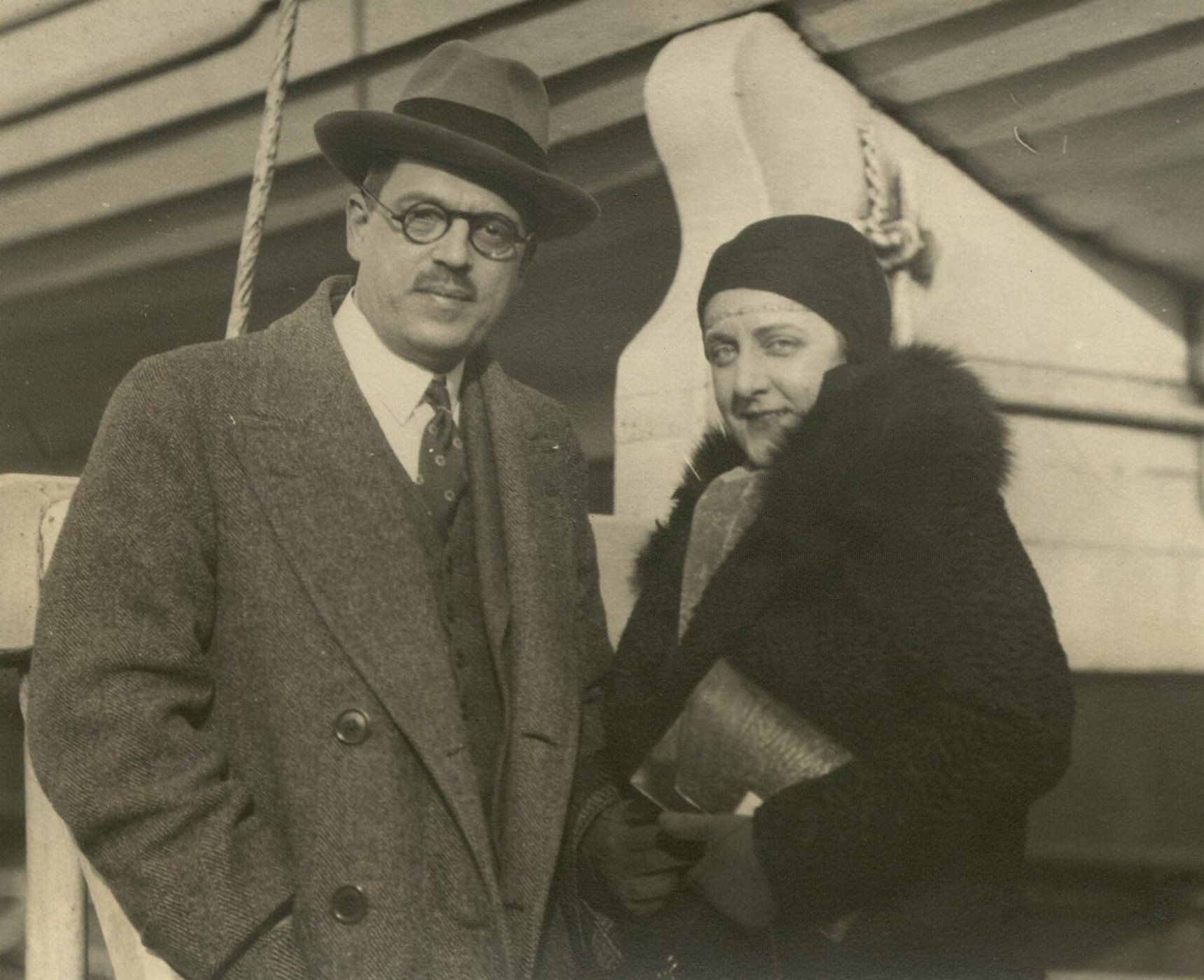
Andre Morize and Ruth Morize (right) traveling.

Ruth Muzzy Conniston Morize died on October 3, 1952, in Paris, France. Her ashes were placed in a niche at the columbarium of Père Lachaise Cemetery.
