= Ave Maria (Vierne) =

Choral composition by Franz Biebl

- Sacred song by Louis Vierne
- Key: B major
- Opus: 3
- Text: Ave Maria
- Language: Latin
- Published: c. 1890
- Scoring: mezzo-soprano; organ

Ave Maria (Hail Mary), Op. 3, by Louis Vierne is a sacred song, originally composed c. 1890 for mezzo-soprano and organ.

== History ==
Vierne was the organist and choirmaster of. He composed Ave Maria c. 1890. It was published by Julien Hamelle. The composition was transposed for other voice ranges, and transcribed for mixed choir. Both solo and choral versions were recorded.

== Text ==
The text in Latin is taken from the Ave Maria. The first part is a verse from the Annunciation, from the Gospel of Luke, while the second part is a prayer for Mary's intercession:

Latin

Ave Maria, gratia plena,
Dominus tecum.
Ave, Ave Maria.
Benedicta tu in mulieribus,
et benedictus fructus ventris tui, Jesus.

Sancta Maria, mater Dei,
ora pro nobis peccatoribus
nunc et in hora mortis nostrae.
Amen.

English

Hail Mary, full of grace,
the Lord is with thee.
Hail, Hail Mary.
blessed art thou amongst women,
and blessed is the Fruit of thy womb, Jesus.

Holy Mary, Mother of God,
pray for us sinners
now and at the hour of our death.
Amen.
