= Le Fleix =

- Commune
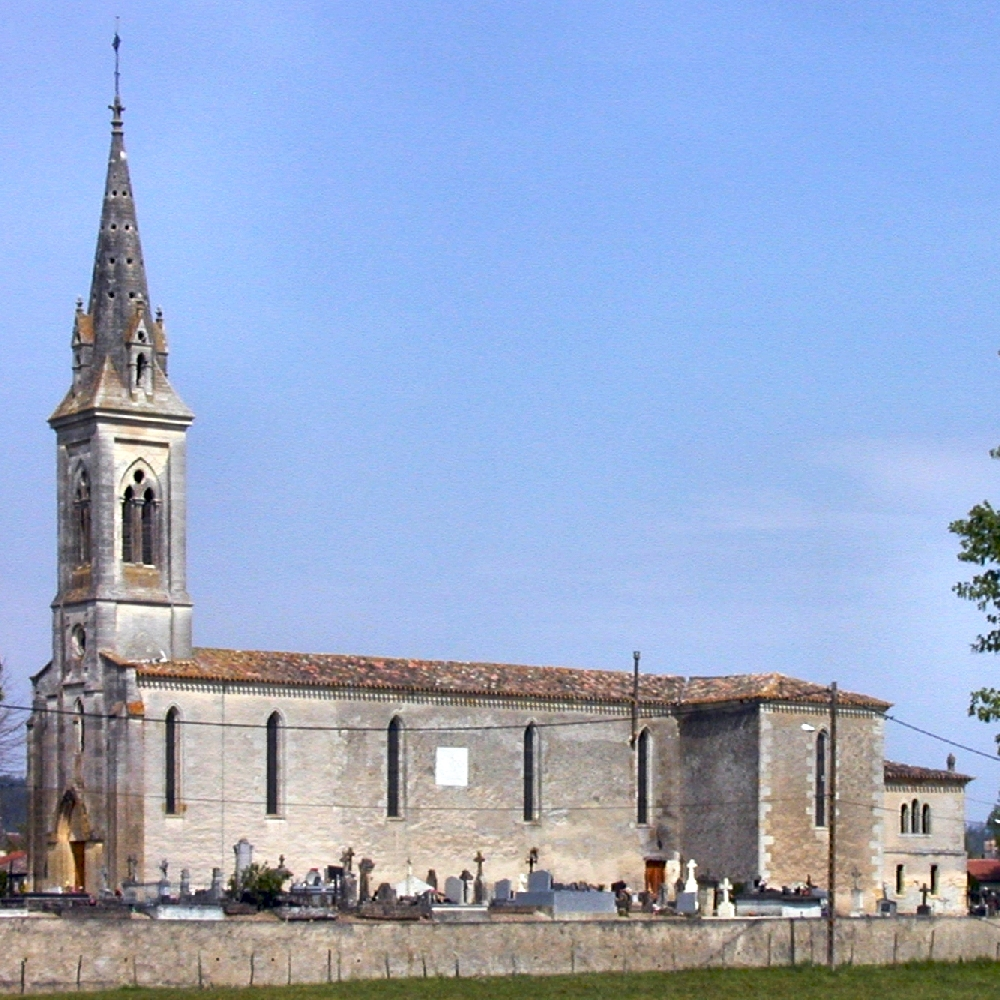
- The church in Le Fleix

- Coat of arms
- Location of Le Fleix
- Location within France Location within Nouvelle-Aquitaine
- Coordinates: 44°52′31″N 0°14′32″E
- Country: France
- Region: Nouvelle-Aquitaine
- Department: Dordogne
- Arrondissement: Bergerac
- Canton: Pays de la Force
- Intercommunality: CA Bergeracoise

Government
  - Mayor (2020–2026): Lionel Filet
- Area^{1}: 18.05 km^{2} (6.97 sq mi)
- Elevation: 18 m (59 ft)
- Highest elevation: 157 m (515 ft)
- Lowest elevation: 6 m (20 ft)
- Population (2023): 1,488
  - Density: 82.44/km^{2} (213.5/sq mi)
- Time zone: UTC+01:00 (CET)
  - Summer (DST): UTC+02:00 (CEST)
- INSEE/Postal code: 24182 /24130
- ^{1} French Land Register data, which excludes lakes, ponds, glaciers > 1 km^{2} (0.386 sq mi or 247 acres) and river estuaries.

Le Fleix (French pronunciation: [lə flɛ]; Occitan: Lo Flèis) is a commune in the Dordogne department in Nouvelle-Aquitaine in southwestern France.

Le Fleix lies on the banks of the Dordogne at a place where the river bends. This is likely the origin of the name "flexus".

== History ==
Le Fleix is famous for the Treaty of Fleix, signed there in 1580.

There were once two castles in Le Fleix, the Old Castle, which was destroyed, and the New Castle built in the 17th century as a residence for Frédéric de Foix. It was sold during the French Revolution, and became a Protestant church in 1805.

== Population ==
Historical population
Year	Pop.	±% p.a.
1968	1,253	—
1975	1,224	−0.33%
1982	1,241	+0.20%
1990	1,278	+0.37%
1999	1,345	+0.57%
2007	1,417	+0.65%
2012	1,461	+0.61%
2017	1,485	+0.33%
2023	1,488	+0.03%
Source: INSEE

== Economy ==
The harbour is active in the timber and wine trades. The economy, once based on the river, is now primarily viticultural.

== Notable people ==
- Andre Morize (1883–1957), French professor
- Reclus family, a family involved in French political and intellectual life

== See also ==
- Communes of the Dordogne department
