= Ewald Kooiman =

Dutch organist (1938–2009)

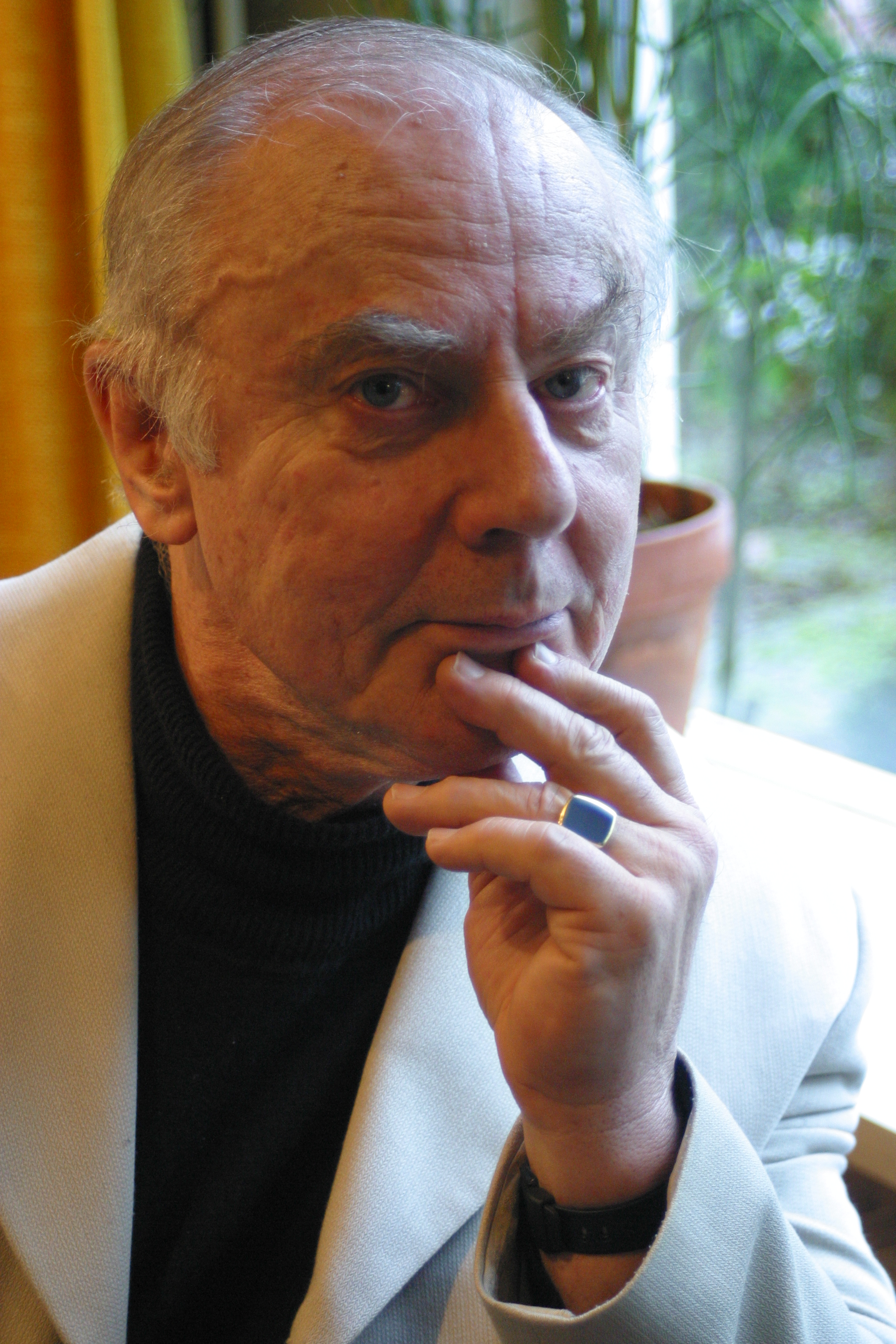
Ewald Kooiman

Ewald Kooiman (14 June 1938 in Wormer, North Holland – 25 January 2009 in Hurghada), was a Dutch organist. He studied organ in Amsterdam with Piet Kee and with Jean Langlais in Paris. In addition, he was professor of Romance languages.

== Recordings ==
He recorded the complete organ works of Johann Sebastian Bach twice on contemporary organs on LP and CD. A third recording cycle on Silbermann organs in Alsace, which Kooiman had started in April 2008 for the German label Aeolus was only partly completed at the time of his unexpected death.

== Teaching ==
Kooiman taught organ at the Vrije Universiteit in Amsterdam, as well as at the International Summer Academy for Organists in Haarlem, with a particular emphasis on the performance of J.S. Bach's organ music. Jos van der Kooy and Christine Kamp are among his students.

As a visiting professor, he taught at various universities in Europe, South Africa and Korea. He also edited more than 50 editions of organ music, mainly covering the 17th to the 19th century. Kooiman was internationally recognized as a specialist in historically informed performance, particularly with regard to the organ works of Johann Sebastian Bach. He published numerous books and articles on Bach performance practice and other organ-related research topics.

Kooiman died of a cardiac arrest during a holiday trip to Egypt on 25 January 2009.
