= Symphony (Vierne) =

Symphony by Louis Vierne

- by Louis Vierne
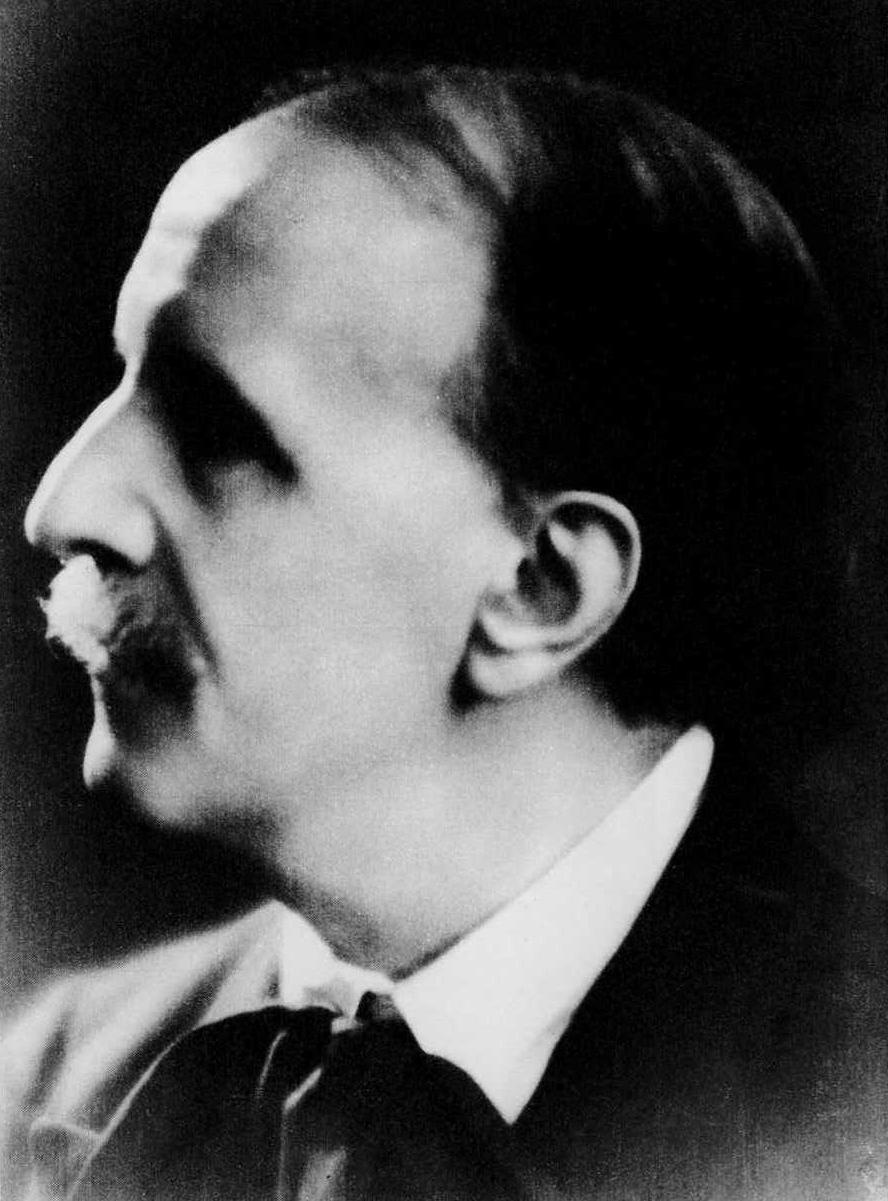
- The composer in 1910
- Key: A minor
- Opus: 24
- Composed: 1907–08
- Dedication: Gabriel Fauré
- Performed: 26 January 1919
- Movements: four

The Symphony en la mineur, op. 24 by Louis Vierne is the composer's second symphonic score, after Praxinoë op. 22, and is the only symphony for orchestra by the blind organist of Notre-Dame de Paris who composed six Organ Symphonies.

Composed in 1907 and 1908, a contemporary of Vierne's Cello Sonata, Op. 23, the Symphony is marked by the circumstances of its composition, in this case his troubled family life and strained relations with his wife, which led to a divorce in 1909. The first performance of the work took place on 26 January 1919 at the Salle Gaveau conducted by Gabriel Pierné. The score, still unpublished, is now in the public domain.

== Composition ==
Vierne composed his Symphony during the summers of 1907 and 1908, spent in Juziers. The composition of a work for orchestra, between organ symphonies, is a particularly hard physical ordeal for the musician:

Without a doubt, had he not been almost blind, he would have composed much more for orchestra. It is truly a tragedy, for his only orchestral Symphony reveals a master born of the genre and ranks alongside the most important works written in France at the time by Chausson, Dukas, Magnard and soon by Roussel.

If his sight, "weakened but appreciable nevertheless, had allowed him to write his compositions with a pen and to have recourse to a third party only for the work of copying or orchestration, which would have fatigued him too much", it is always in the glow of a bec Auer (so close and a fire so intense that he confided to one of his friends that "the litters would end up becoming bloody".

The circumstances of the composition are also marked by the composer's marital problems:

For some years the household had been morally separated. Difference of tastes, feelings? [...] Two beings separated, who loved each other. Vierne suffers terribly from this, and since, in his home, all pain manifests itself in music, since the creative impulse is rooted in a violent feeling, whatever it may be, he undertakes to write a Symphony for orchestra, the epigraph of which says enough about the weariness that suddenly embraces him:

O se peut-il qu'il ait été
Des jours clairs et des nuits d'été…

== Premiere ==
The score is immediately proposed for study, in its version for piano four hands:

as soon as the first two beats are completed, he runs to Pugno, who deciphers them on the piano with Nadia Boulanger. Pugno admires the expressive sobriety of the 'Allegro' and, while his fingers are peeling off the desolate lament of the Lamento, he gives Vierne eloquent glances; then when he has finished, he stands up and, without a word, comes to kiss his friend Gavoty.

The first performance of the work was not to take place until 26 January 1919 in the Salle Gaveau (in the composer's absence, still convalescent in Savoy) under the direction of Gabriel Pierné, and not Camille Chevillard as Bernard Gavoty mentions. Adolphe Boschot, (surprised by the work's romanticism), wonders about its date of composition in an article in L'Écho de Paris dated 27 January:

We would like to know if this symphony is recent or if it is ten or twenty years old.

The work, dedicated to Gabriel Fauré, has never been published: the manuscript preserved at the Bibliothèque Nationale de France under the title "Vma-Ms. 645", is now in the public domain.

== Introduction ==
=== Setting ===
The orchestra consists of 3 flutes (the 3rd also playing the piccolo), 2 oboes, 1 English horn, 2 clarinets in A, 1 bass clarinet in A, 2 bassoons and contrabassoon, for the lecterns of the Wind instrument. The brass instruments consist of 4 horns in F, 4 trumpets in C, 2 tenor trombones and two bass trombones. Percussion is limited to timpani but requires two timpanists. The classical string quintet consists of the first violins, second violins, alto, cello and double bass.

The orchestration of the "Symphony" is remarkable for its "dark colours", with the rare presence of two bass trombones instead of the tuba associated with a bass trombone.

=== Mouvements ===
The "Symphony" op. 24 is in two large "parts" or four movements:

1. Grave in A minor in four beats – Allegro molto in 2/4 – enchaîné
2. Lamento – Adagio molto in F♯ minor to 3/4
3. Scherzo – Animato ma non troppo in D minor to 6/8 – chained
4. Finale – Allegro moderato in A major two-beat

== Analysis ==
The Lamento, "whose character is more than melancholy, bears as its epigraph verses from Verlaine which Vierne later used for one of the melodies of Spleens et détresses":

Un grand sommeil noir
Tombe sur ma vie;
Dormez, tout espoir,
Dormez, toute envie…

For Gavoty, "this suggestive Lamento, like everything else in Vierne's work that springs from the heart, is the most original part of the symphony, the other three movements (Grave and Allegro molto, Scherzo and Finale) being, in spite of their masterful craftsmanship, of a more traditional cut".

== Legacy ==
From its late premiere, this symphony was considered a little timid. Gavoty, however, considers it to be

one of the beautiful orchestral works of the pre-war period, and one of the last testimonies of symphonic art, which, after 1918, no longer found the favour it had enjoyed at the junction of the two centuries: Louis Vierne's symphony is, along with those of Paul Dukas, Vincent d'Indy and Albéric Magnard, a fine example of the generous and inspired flame that animated the French school before 1914.

== Recording ==
- Louis Vierne : Symphonie en la mineur op. 24, Poème pour piano et orchestre op. 50, by the Orchestre Philharmonique de Liège, directed by Pierre Bartholomée (1996, CD Timpani 1C1036)
