= Treaty of Fleix =

1580 treaty between France and the Huguenots

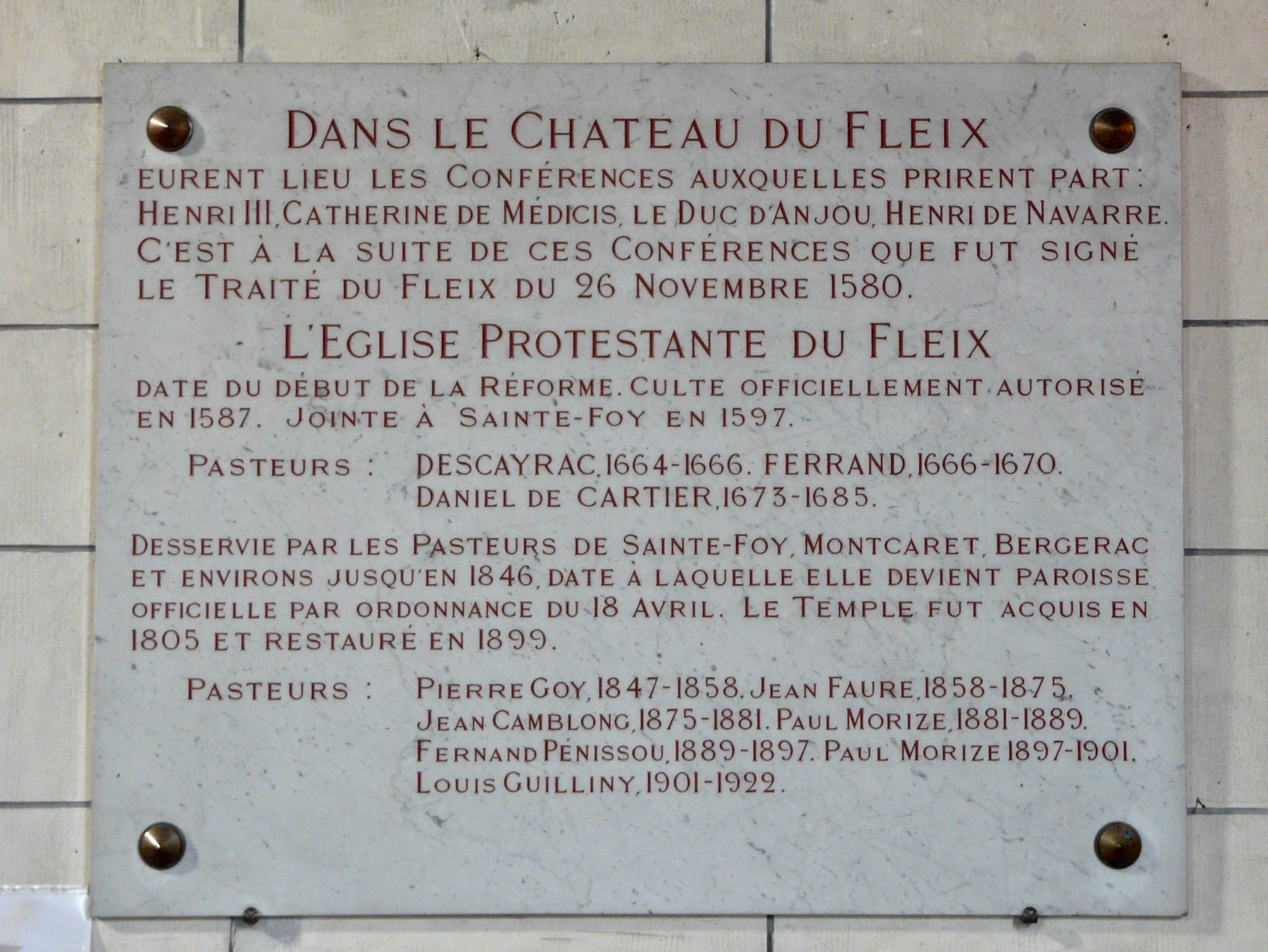

The Treaty of Fleix (also known as the Edict of Fleix and the Peace of Fleix) was signed on 26 November 1580 by Henry III of France in Le Fleix.

== See also ==
- List of treaties
