= Messe solennelle (Vierne) =

Mass by Louis Vierne

- Mass by Louis Vierne
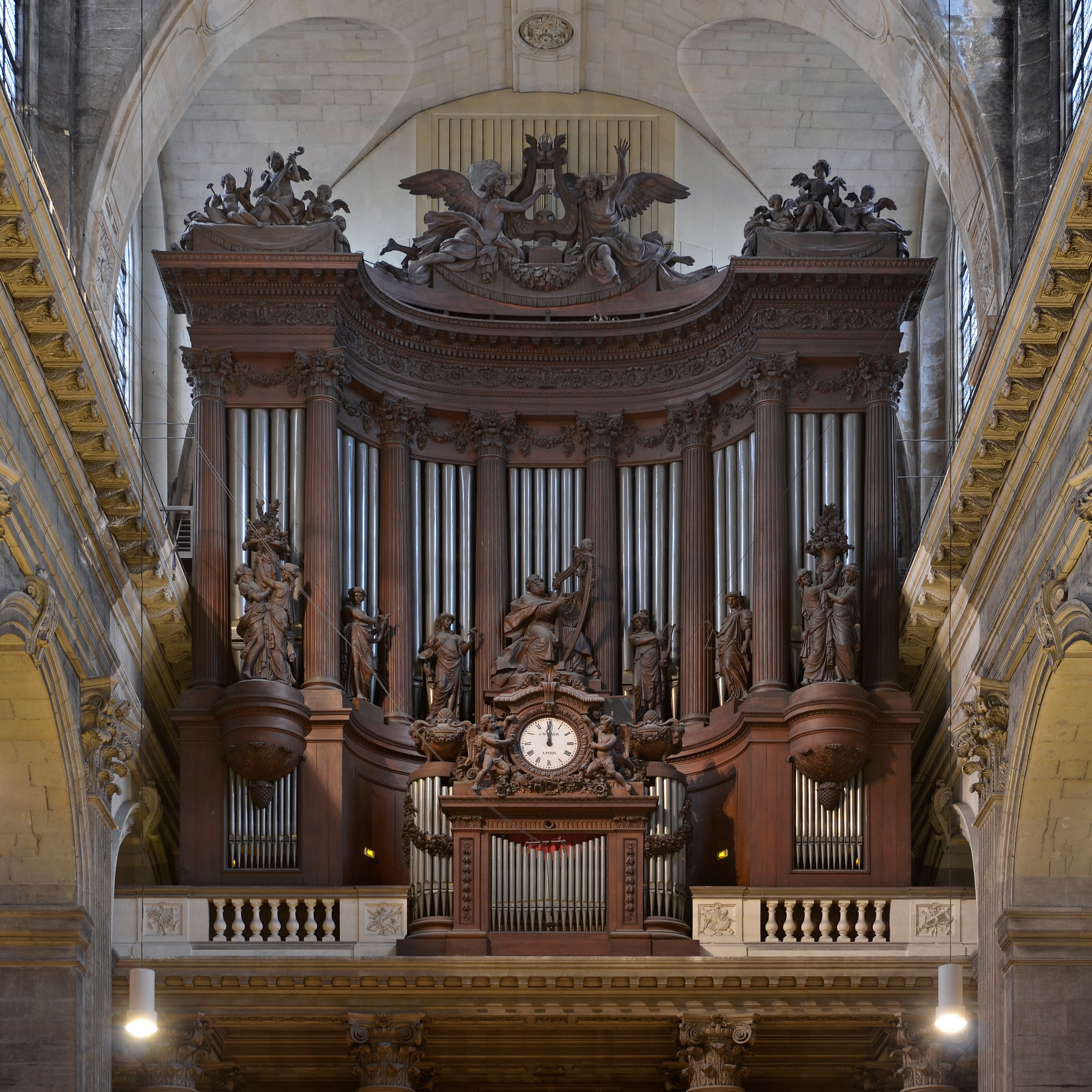
- The great organ at Saint-Sulpice, where the mass was first performed
- Key: C♯ minor
- Opus: 16
- Form: Missa brevis
- Text: Mass ordinary
- Language: Latin
- Composed: 1899
- Dedication: Théodore Dubois
- Performed: 8 December 1901
- Published: 1900
- Movements: five
- Vocal: SATB choir
- Instrumental: 2 organs

The Messe solennelle (Solemn Mass) in C♯ minor, Op. 16, is a mass by the French composer Louis Vierne. He composed it in 1899, scored for choir and two organs. It was published in 1900, before it was first performed at Saint-Sulpice in Paris in December 1901. Although scored for two pipe organs, it was later adapted for a single organ, as most churches could not provide two such instruments.

== History ==
In 1899, Vierne set the Latin text of the mass ordinary without the Credo, which makes it a formally a short mass or missa brevis. He imagined a mass for orchestra, but Charles-Marie Widor, his teacher and organist at Saint-Sulpice in Paris advised him to employ organs, for practical reasons. The mass was first performed at Saint-Sulpice in 1901, on the Feast of the Immaculate Conception, 8 December. The church has a great organ (grand orgue) in its back built by François-Henri Clicquot which Aristide Cavaillé-Coll had reconstructed and improved in 1862. The choir organ, in the choir, was built by Cavaillé-Coll in 1858. Vierne planned the effect of sound from the far ends of the church. In the premiere, Widor played the main organ, while the composer, who was by then organist at Notre-Dame de Paris, played the choir organ.

The mass was first published in 1900 by Pérégally & Fils in Paris, dedicated to Théodore Dubois. An arrangement for choir and one organ was made by Zsigmond Szathmáry, as the use of two organs is often not practical. Another arrangement for one organ by Markus Frank Hollingshau was published by Dr. J. Butz.

== Structure and music ==
The mass is structured in five movements, omitting a Credo. The choir is mostly four-part, SATB, but at times divided further. In the following table of the movements, the markings, keys and signatures are taken from the choral score, using the symbols for common time (4/4) and alla breve.

No.	Part	Incipit	Marking	Key	Time
I	Kyrie		Maestoso ma non troppo lento	C♯ minor	common time
II	Gloria	Et in terra pax hominibus	Risoluto	A major	cut time
II	Gloria	Domine Deus	Molto quasi doppio più lento	F♯ minor	common time
II	Gloria	Quoniam tu solus sanctus	Tempo	A major	cut time
III	Sanctus		Maestoso ma non troppo lento	E major	common time
IV	Benedictus		Poco più vivo	E major	common time
V	Agnus Dei		Andante	C♯ minor	3/4

Vierne builds on models by his teacher Widor and of César Franck, but adds more development of themes and "imaginative expression". He uses repeated rhythmic figures in the accompaniment. The Kyrie opens with "awesome solemnity", while the "mysterious antiphonal harmonies of the Benedictus" were new sounds in French church music, and the Agnus Dei ends, after antiphonal exchange between choir and great organ, serenely in C♯ major when praying "dona nobis pacem" (Grant us peace).

== Recordings ==
Recordings of the work include a 2009 performance by the Chœur d'Oratorio de Paris at the location of the first performance, who integrate the mass in the music of a complete service, with Saint-Sulpice organist Daniel Roth on the great organ and Éric Lebrun of Église Saint-Antoine-des-Quinze-Vingts on the choir organ. The liturgical chants are performed by the Chœur Gregorien de Paris. The recording has been called "musical and spiritual time-travel".
