= André Fleury (organist) =

French musician (1903–1995)

- Born: 25 July 1903; Neuilly-sur-Seine
- Origin: Paris, France
- Died: 6 August 1995 (aged 92) Le Vésinet
- Genre: classical
- Occupations: composer, pianist, organist, pedagogue
- Instruments: piano, organ
- Years active: 1926–1993

André Edouard Antoine Marie Fleury (25 July 1903 – 6 August 1995) was a French composer, pianist, organist, and pedagogue.

== Life ==
André Fleury was born in Neuilly-sur-Seine, France. He received his musical training as a private student of Henri Letocart (a former student of César Franck), and later, of André Marchal and Louis Vierne. At the Paris Conservatory, he studied organ with Eugène Gigout and received a first prize in organ performance and improvisation under Gigout's successor, Marcel Dupré, in 1926. Fleury also studied composition with Paul Vidal.

In 1920, Fleury became Gigout's assistant at St. Augustin in Paris, and, later, also assistant of Charles Tournemire at Ste. Clotilde. He became titular organist at St. Augustin in 1930. In 1941, he was appointed professor of organ at the École Normale de Musique in Paris.

After World War II, Fleury and his wife left Paris for health reasons, and relocated to Dijon. In 1949, he succeeded Émile Poillot as titular organist at Dijon Cathedral and as professor of piano (a year later also of organ) at the Dijon Conservatory. In 1971, he accepted Jean Guillou's invitation to become co-titular organist at Saint-Eustache in Paris. He also was appointed as professor of organ at the Schola Cantorum and as titular organist at Versailles Cathedral, this duty was taken over by Francis Vidil after his death.

André Fleury died in 1995 at Le Vésinet, France, age 92, and was buried in Arcy-sur-Cure.

As a composer, Fleury wrote numerous works for organ, many of which have not been published yet, however. He also performed extensively throughout Europe. André Fleury premiered several important organ compositions, such as the organ sonata of Darius Milhaud, Maurice Duruflé's Scherzo op. 2, as well as La Nativité du Seigneur by Olivier Messiaen (the first integral performance of this organ cycle, after the premiere by Jean Langlais, Jean-Yves Daniel-Lesur, and Jean-Jacques Grunenwald).

Among his students were Bernard Gavoty, Pierre Cochereau, and Daniel-Lesur.

== Compositions ==
=== Organ Solo ===
- Allegro symphonique (1927)
- Prélude et Fugue No. 1 (1928)
- Vingt-quatre pièces pour orgue ou harmonium (1930–1933)
- Prélude, Andante et Toccata (1931/1932)
- Pièce sans titre (à Odette et Jean Degouy) (1933)
- Postlude (dernière des 24 pièces - arrangé pour Grand Orgue) (1935)
- Symphonie No. 1 (1938/1943)
- Pastorale (1941)
- Divertissement sur un Noël (1941)
- Variations sur Adeste Fideles (1942)
- Pour la Pentecôte, Veni Sancti Spiritus (1943)
- Toccata sur l'Ite Missa Est pascal (1943 or 1944)
- Versets sur le Veni Creator (1945)
- Carillon sur le Victimae Paschali Laudes (1945)
- Offertoire pour l'Ascension (1945)
- Offertoire sur deux Noëls (1945 or 1946)
- Sortie sur un vieux Noël (1945 or 1946)
- Symphonie No. 2 (1946/1947)
- Variations sur Haec Dies (1946)
- Postlude (en Ré) (1947)
- Paraphrase sur l'Alleluia de la Messe de Pâques (1947)
- Prélude à l'Introït (1947, unpublished)
- Offertoire (1947)
- Sortie pascale (O Filii) (1947)
- Prélude sur l'Introït Resurrexi (1949)
- Vexilla Regis (1949)
- Messe pour la fête de tous les saints (1954)
- Prélude à l'Introït VXIème dimanche après la Pentecôte (1954)
- Psaume pour les morts de la guerre (1954, unpublished)
- Prélude et Fugue No. 2 (1957–1959)
- Variations sur un Noël bourguignon (1959/1960)
- Offertoire pour une messe de la Sainte Vierge (Ave Maria) (1959)
- Entrée pour le XVIème dimanche après la Pentecôte (1961)
- Offertoire pour le XVIème dimanche après la Pentecôte (1961, unpublished)
- Elévation pour le XVIème dimanche après la Pentecôte (1962, unpublished)
- Communion pour le XVIème dimanche après la Pentecôte (1963, unpublished)
- Postlude pour le XVIème dimanche après la Pentecôte (1965, unpublished)
- Sept pièces (sans pédale obligatoire) (1967)
- Fantaisie (Honos alit artes) (1969)
- Prélude, Cantilène et Final (1981)
- Transcription du Vézinet de Rameau (1983)
- Versets sur l'hymne Lucis Creator (1990)
- Pièce sans titre Tampon (1993)

=== Organ with other instruments ===
- Marche for trumpet and organ (1980, unpublished)
- Méditation for cello and organ (1988, unpublished)

=== Piano Solo ===
- Trois pièces (1946/1947)
- Quatre pièces brèves (1951, unpublished)
- Trois pièces (1953)

=== Undated Compositions ===
- Versets sur l'hymne Lucis Creator for organ
- Trois versets sur A Solis Ortus Cardine for organ
- Transcription de la Berceuse extr. de Dolly (Fauré) for organ
- Sujets de fugues, thèmes d'improvisation (P. Cochereau, M. Dupré)
- Prélude à l'Introït / XVIème dimanche après la Pentecôte for organ
- Mouvements de trio avec piano'
- Magnificat du 8ème mode for organ
- In memoriam Louis Vierne for organ
- Finale des Variations sur O Filii for organ
- Esquisses d'une pièce en hommage à Jehan Alain for organ
- Esquisse du 3ème mouvement d'un Tryptique pour orgue'
- Choeur "A Jésus ouvrier" '
