= Denise Launay =

French organist and musicologist

- Born: 7 October 1906; Paris
- Died: 13 March 1993 (aged 86); Paris
- Occupations: Organist; Musicologist

Denise Launay (7 October 1906 – 13 March 1993) was a 20th-century French organist and musicologist.

== Biography ==
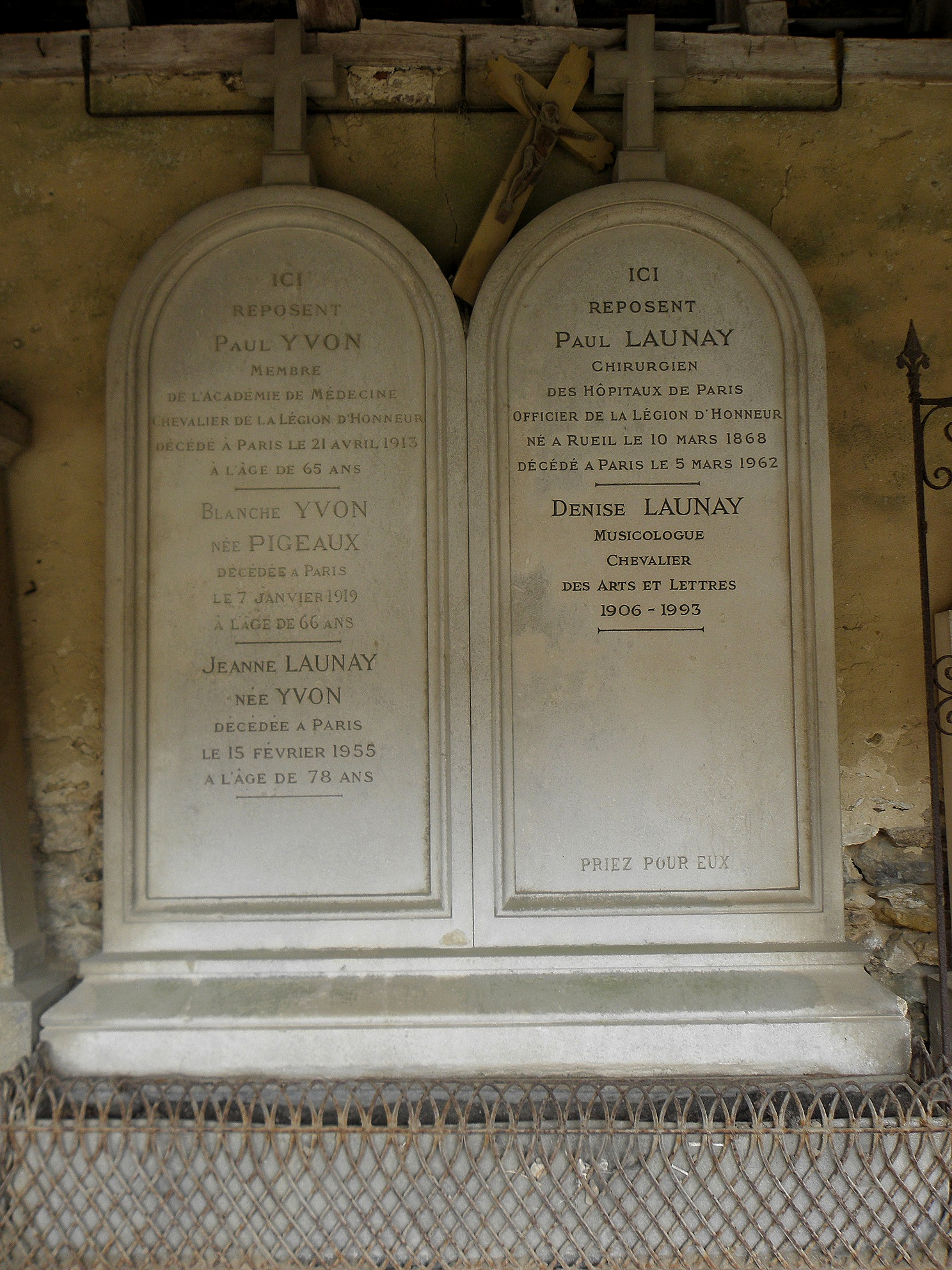
Denise Launay's grave at Montfort-l'Amaury.

Launay studied the history of music with André Pirro and Paul-Marie Masson at the Sorbonne, and the organ with André Marchal and Gaston Litaize. From 1939, she was a curator at the Bibliothèque Nationale de France. She was the organist at the Notre-Dame-de-Lorette church in Paris during 35 ans.

She was buried at Montfort-l'Amaury Cemetery, alongside her father Paul Launay, surgeon, member of Paris hospitals.

== Works ==
=== Publications ===
- 1965: Essai d’un commentaire de Titelouze par lui-même
- 1974: Anthologie du psaume français polyphonique (1610–1663), tome 1 (n°1 to 14), Éditions ouvrières, 35 p.
- 1993: La musique religieuse en France du Concile de Trente à 1804, Société française de musicologie et Éditions Klincksieck, Paris, ISBN 2-252-02921-8, 583 p.
