= Bernard Gavoty =

- Born: Bernard Georges-Marie Gavoty; 2 April 1908; 8th arrondissement of Paris, France
- Died: 24 October 1981 (aged 73); 7th arrondissement of Paris, France
- Other name: Clarendon
- Education: Cours Hattemer; Institut national agronomique; Sorbonne University; Conservatoire de Paris
- Employers: Jeunesses musicales de France; Office de Radiodiffusion Télévision Française
- Spouse: Victoire Vignon (m. 1944)
- Children: 2
- Parent: Raymond Gavoty (father)

Comedy career
- Years active: 1942-1981
- Medium: television; journalism; essays
- Subjects: Classical music; Pipe organs; Musicology

Bernard Georges-Marie Gavoty (2 April 1908 – 24 October 1981), also known by the pen name Clarendon, was a French organist, musicologist, writer, talk show host and winegrower. He was known popularly for being a pundit on classical music and the pipe organ, subjects he would prolifically discuss and write various books and essays about in a manner accessible to both cognoscenti and dilettanti.

His most famous work was the monographic series Les grands interprètes (The Great Interpreters), which focused on documenting the endeavours of contemporary classical musicians. The series were adapted for television in 1961, and he would likewise host this programme.

Gavoty was also known as the host of Au cœur de la musique (At the Heart of Music), a talk show and multimedia programme focusing on classical music in general, and served as head of the Domaine Gavoty winegrowing firm from 1937 until his death.

== Biography ==
Bernard Gavoty was born on 2 April 1908 in the eighth arrondissement of Paris to a family of Catholics. His parents were Raymond Gavoty, a deputy of the Var department (11 March 1866 - 20 January 1937 in Paris), and Geneviève Magimel (9 October 1875 in Paris - 17 October 1946 ibid.). He was the middle of three brothers: his elder sibling was Jacques (9 May 1900 - 25 September 1983) and his younger one was François (born 5 May 1912), a sales advisor. He attended the Cours Hattemer.

Following studies under Louis Vierne, Gavoty entered the organ and composition classes of the Conservatoire de Paris while also studying literature and philosophy at the Sorbonne University. The Conservatoire's organ class was taught by Marcel Dupré and André Fleury. There, his classmates included Denise Launay, Michel Boulnois, Antoine Reboulot, Félicien Wolff, and Jean-Jacques Grunenwald, among others. Gavoty would hold a special place amongst Dupré's students.

He was also an agricultural engineer, having graduated from the Institut national agronomique: following his father's death in 1937, Gavoty managed the Domaine Gavoty winegrowing firm in Cabasse, which his family founded in 1806. This firm is presently managed by his granddaughter Roselyne.

Aside from his prolific concert career (having delivered over five-hundred organ recitals around France and the world), Gavoty was also recognised for eloquent oration and writing. He frequently delivered lectures, especially for Jeunesses musicales de France (later Jeunesses Musicales International). Furthermore, in 1945, Gavoty was hired as principal music critic for Le Figaro (succeeding Reynaldo Hahn) under the pseudonym Clarendon, referencing the protagonist of Pierre-Augustin de Beaumarchais' play Eugénie. He also wrote - either as Clarendon or under his real name - for various local and international periodicals. He did so until his death.

In 1942, he was appointed titular organist of the grand organ of the Église Saint-Louis des Invalides; he had the instrument rebuilt in 1955 by the Beuchet-Debierre firm to adhre to prevailing neoclassical æsthetic. From 1948 onwards (sponsored by the Office de Radiodiffusion Télévision Française), Gavoty was seen in various musical and artistic documentaries and broadcasts as a narrator or commentator. He frequently appeared on the single television channel, especially on his own talk show Au cœur de la musique, discussing classical music throughout the 1950s and 1960s.

Gavoty was elected a member of the Académie des beaux-arts in 1976, succeeding Julien Cain in the fifth seat of the section for unattached members; he served until his death, upon which he was succeeded by investment banker Michel David-Weill the following year.

== Personal life ==
In 1944, Gavoty married Monique Victoire Marie Vignon (15 May 1916 - 19 January 2003); she simply went by Victoire Vignon. She was born in Mably and died in the eighteenth arrondissement of Paris. They had two daughters: Marie-Ange (born 11 October 1945) and Cécile (born 17 June 1949).

Gavoty died on 24 October 1981 in the seventh arrondissement of Paris; he was seventy-three.

== Bibliography ==
- Louis Vierne : La vie et l'œuvre, Paris, Albin Michel, 1943; new ed. 1979 OCLC 2500413
- Jehan Alain, musicien français, Paris, Albin Michel, 1945; reissued Éditions d'Aujourd'hui (Introuvables), 1985 OCLC 21548494
- Les Français sont-ils musiciens ?, éditions Conquistador, 1950
- Deux capitales romantiques : Vienne Paris, SACEM, 1953
- Pour ou contre la musique nouvelle ?, with François Lesure, Flammarion
- Carl Schuricht, Geneva, series Les grands interprètes, René Kister, 1954
- Edwin Fischer, Geneva, series Les grands interprètes, René Kister, 1954
- Walter Gieseking, Geneva, series Les grands interprètes, René Kister, 1954 OCLC 12169813
- Wilhelm Kempff, Geneva, series Les grands interprètes, René Kister, 1954
- Roberto Benzi, Geneva, series Les grands interprètes, René Kister, 1954
- Alfred Cortot, Geneva, series Les grands interprètes, René Kister, 1955
- Pablo Casals, Geneva, series Les grands interprètes, René Kister, 1955 OCLC 802804623
- André Cluytens, Geneva, series Les grands interprètes, René Kister, 1955 OCLC 901885362
- Yehudi Menuhin et Georges Enesco, Geneva, series Les grands interprètes, René Kister, 1955 OCLC 422015293
- Arthur Rubinstein, Geneva, series Les grands interprètes, René Kister, 1955 OCLC 46637333
- Samson François, Geneva, series Les grands interprètes, René Kister, 1956 OCLC 58820657
- Wanda Landowska, Geneva, series Les grands interprètes, René Kister, 1956 OCLC 898902067
- Victoria de los Ángeles, Geneva, series Les grands interprètes, René Kister, 1956 OCLC 470639068
- Nathan Milstein, Geneva, series Les grands interprètes, René Kister, 1956 OCLC 715079166
- Bruno Walter Geneva, series Les grands interprètes, René Kister, 1956 OCLC 47065527
- Witold Malcuzynski, Geneva, series Les grands interprètes, René Kister, 1957 OCLC 901885161
- Elisabeth Schwarzkopf, Geneva, series Les grands interprètes, René Kister, 1957 OCLC 718247457
- La Musique adoucit les mœurs ?, Paris, Gallimard, 1959
- Chopin amoureux, La Palatine, 1960
- Dix grands musiciens, Gautier-Languereau, 1962
- Vingt grands interprètes, Lausanne, Rencontres, 1966.
- Lettre d'Alexis Weissenberg à Bernard Gavoty, 1966
- L'Arme à gauche, Beauchesne, 1971
- Chopin, Paris, Grasset, 1974
- Les grands mystères de la musique, Trévise, 1975 ISBN 978-2-7112-0353-6
- Alfred Cortot, Paris, series Musique, Buchet/Chastel, 1977, rééd. 2012, 378 pages OCLC 810314744
- Anicroches, Paris, series Musique, Buchet/Chastel, 1979, 245 pages, OCLC 419232256
- Liszt, le virtuose, Paris, Julliard, 1980
- Les souvenirs de Georges Enesco, Kryos, 2006

== Discography ==
- Camille Saint-Saëns - 3rd symphony, with organ (1975 - Paris, Égise Saint-Louis-des-Invalides - Orchestre National ORTF, conducted by Jean Martinon - EMI Group),
- Louis Vierne: Marche triomphale - César Franck: Prélude, Fugue et Variation - Claude Balbastre: développement sur le Noël populaire « Joseph est bien marié » (Paris, Saint-Louis-des-Invalides) - Erato, dq 105, 1957. Cuivres, dir. Louis Frémaux. Organ: Marcel Dupré),
- Prières à Saint-Louis-des-Invalides : Pierre de Bréville - Gabriel Fauré - Johann Sebastian Bach - César Franck (Paris, Saint-Louis-des-Invalides - Disque Ducretet, M.-R. Chauveau, soprano, 1958 (38),
- L'orgue de Saint-Louis-des-Invalides décrit par Bernard Gavoty (Paris, Saint-Louis-des-Invalides - Le Chant du Monde (éditions musicales et label), c. 1960),
- Johann Sebastian Bach : les pièces cataloguées BWV 617, 645, 653, 659, 680, 686, 727, 734, 582, 541 (Paris, Saint-Louis-des-Invalides - Le Chant du Monde, 1963).

== Theatre ==
- 1971: Dumas le magnifique by Alain Decaux, directed by Julien Bertheau, Théâtre du Palais Royal
- 1975: Les Secrets de la Comédie humaine by Félicien Marceau, directed by Paul-Émile Deiber, Théâtre du Palais Royal
