= Carillon de Westminster =

1927 composition by Louis Vierne

- Organ music by Louis Vierne
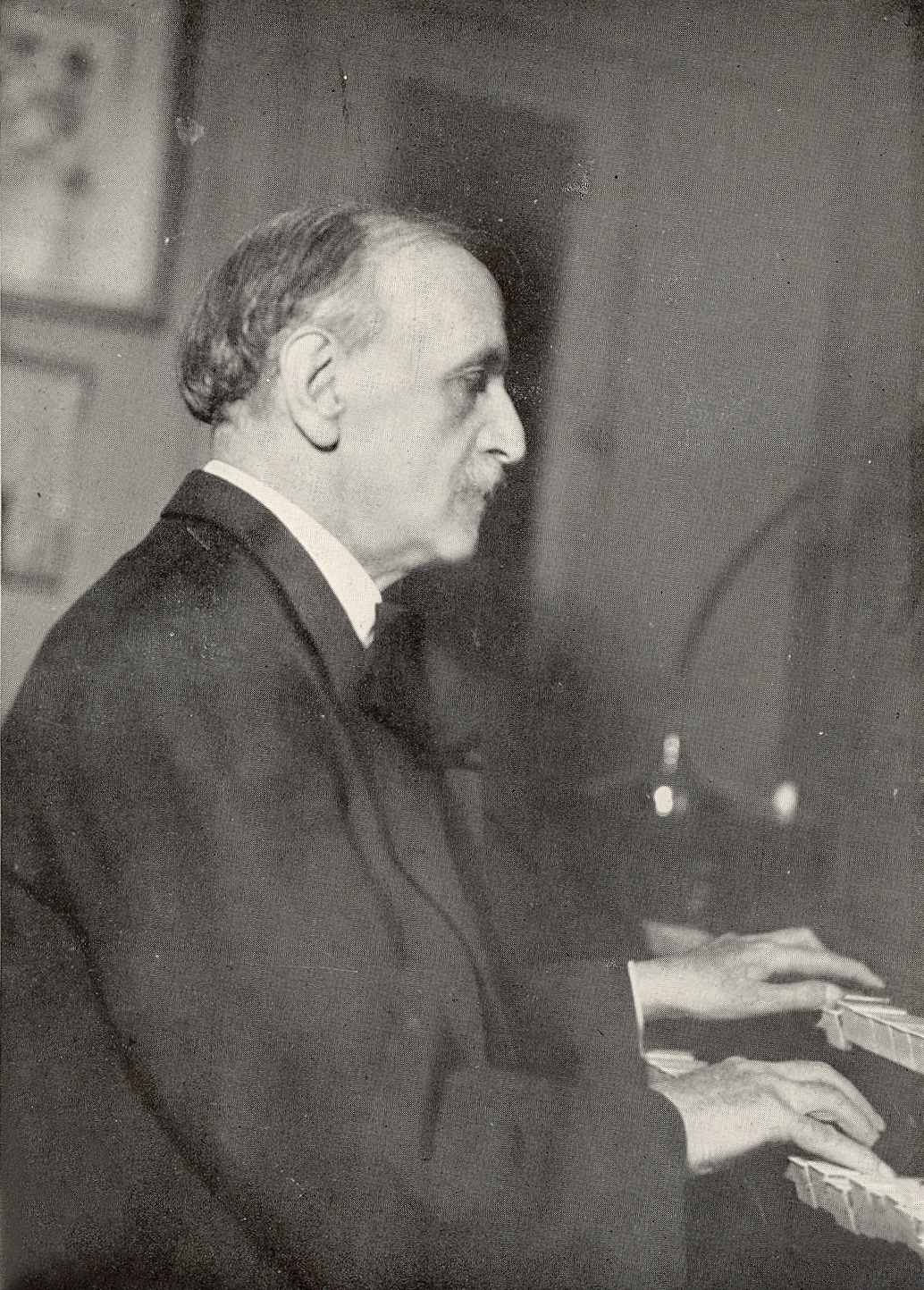
- The composer in 1930
- Key: D major
- Opus: 54, No. 6
- Dedication: "à mon ami Henry WILLIS - Facteur d'orgues à Londres". NB. The dedicatee is Henry Willis III, not to be confused with his grandfather Henry 'Father' Willis
- Performed: Composed version first performed by the composer, 29 November 1927, based on an improvisation from 1924.

Premiere
- Location: Composed version premiered in Notre Dame, Paris; original improvisation in Westminster Cathedral

Carillon de Westminster, Op. 54, No. 6, is a piece written for organ by Louis Vierne. It constitutes the sixth piece in the third suite of Vierne's four-suite set 24 pieces de fantaisie, first published in 1927. Carillon de Westminster is in the key of D major, and is in compound triple time.

== Origin and inspiration ==
As indicated by the title, Carillon de Westminster is a fantasia on the Westminster chimes, which are chimed hourly from the Clock Tower, Palace of Westminster, since 1858. The chimes play four notes in the key of E major, G♯, F♯, E, and B in various patterns every fifteen minutes. The Westminster chimes are in 5/4 time, whereas Vierne's piece is in triple time.

The published piece has its origin in an improvisation during a concert given by Vierne in 1924 in Westminster Cathedral, at which event it is rumoured that Vierne's friend Henry Willis III, the builder of the Westminster organ, hummed the tune for the composer upon Vierne's request. The rumour continues that either Willis hummed the tune incorrectly or Vierne misheard his friend upon transcription; in any case Vierne misquoted the second quarter of the chimes. Instead of jumping up a third from the tonic, dropping down a whole step, and landing on the fifth, Vierne's version moves up in whole steps to the third before moving down to the fifth. Vierne then stays on the fifth, leaps to the second, then third note of the scale and ends on the tonic. In essence, he uses a variant of the third phrase of the chimes followed by the fifth phrase, rather than the second and third phrases that normally form the second quarter. There is debate among musicologists as to whether or not Willis did misquote the tune, or if Vierne altered the melody to suit his own purpose (and certainly the 1927 composed and published version, which is dedicated to Willis, does not attempt to 'correct' such a possible 1924 misunderstanding of the melody to match the Westminster Chimes). However, at some points in the piece, Vierne uses the second phrase in its standard "Westminster" version, including as early as the opening statement of the tune for the fourth quarter. Moreover, he alters the order of the phrases and the frequency with which they occur as the piece develops, using the fifth phrase more extensively and finally shortening the overall cycle from 10 phrases to 7.

== Performance ==
Vierne first performed Carillon de Westminster at Notre Dame, Paris on 29 November 1927 for the ending of Forty Hours at the cathedral. The piece was an instant success. Vierne's student, Henri Doyen, observed that it was "... one of the rare times when I saw the clergy and faithful not sortie ... Everyone, to the great desperation of the verger and sacristans 'who had never seen anything like it', waited quietly until the end, and a number of people improvised a little ovation for the maître when he came down from the tribune."

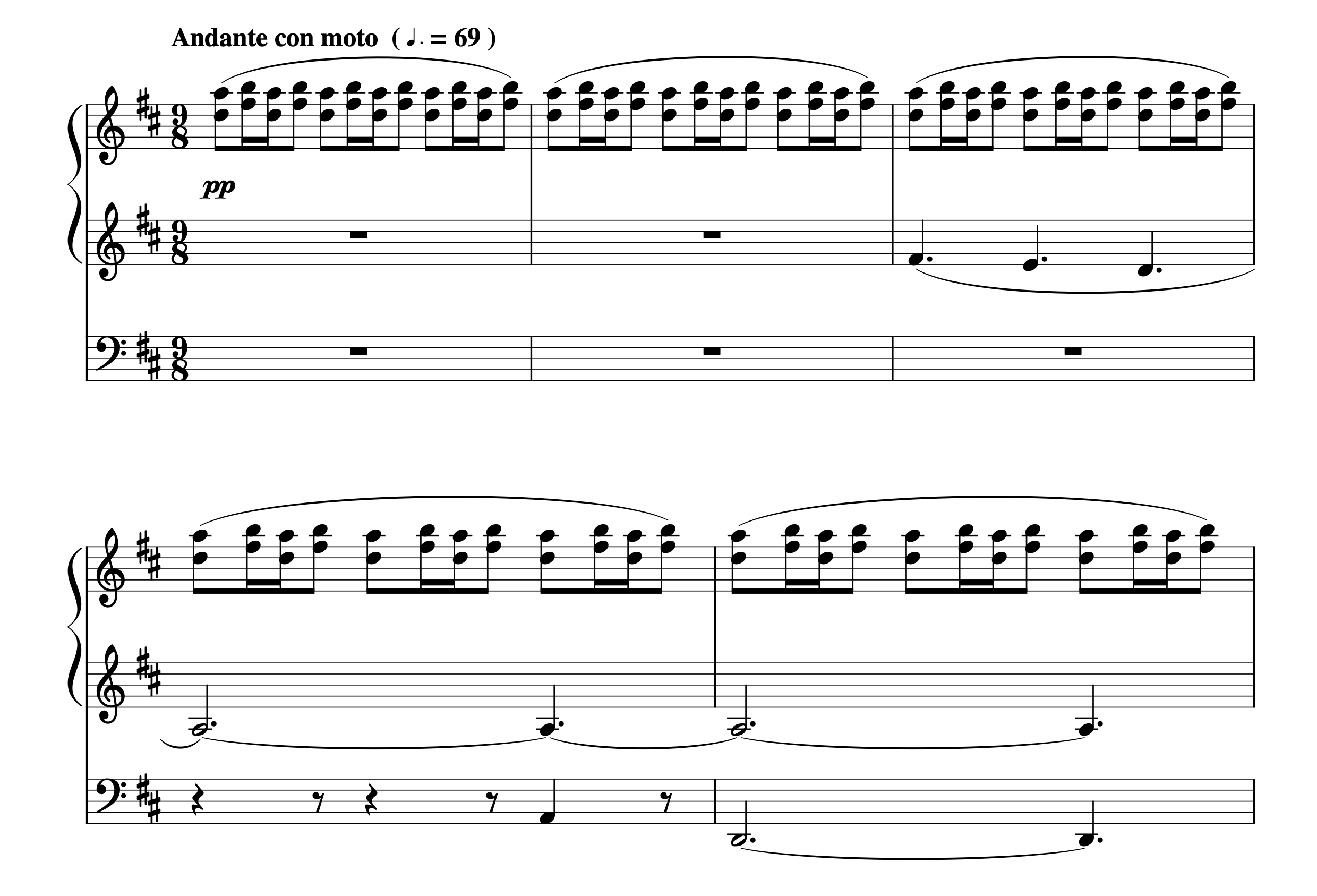
Carillon de Westminster from 24 Pièces de fantaisie

When playing the piece today, the organist should keep in mind a number of guidelines typical to a Vierne performance. Registration is not inflexible, and Vierne noted this in his introduction to 24 pieces de fantaisie: "It [registration] is an indication for the general colorings […] that can be modified according to the possibilities offered by the instruments on which they [the pieces] are to be performed." Vierne indicates Fonds et anches for the Récit expressif manual, and Fonds et anches, et principals for the Positif, Grand, and Pédale manuals. The Westminster tune within the piece is played on the Positif and Récit coupled, so as to give the theme substantial prominence over the pedal and harmony lines. The supporting secondary theme (rapid eighth and sixteenth note groupings against the dotted-quarter note primary theme) opening the piece is given less registration and seems to bubble along, weaving in and out of its strong namesake theme. Stops are added little by little throughout the piece, gradually building up to the climax using full organ and a fully open swell box (precise stops to be determined by performer and his or her organ).

Carillon de Westminster, op. 54
Matthias Flierl plays the organ of St. Jakob, Rothenburg ob der Tauber, Germany ( Rieger/Austria, IV/69

Vierne understood similar flexibility with regards to how fast the piece should be played, articulation, and phrasing. Vierne never wrote metronome markings on his manuscripts; he knew that a piece played in a small drawing room could not be played at the same tempo in a cavernous stone cathedral. Whatever tempo chosen should be strictly adhered to throughout the entire piece.

Articulation between phrases is also determined by the venue. For performance of Carillon de Westminster at Notre Dame, breath between phrases would have to be longer in order to remain clear than in a smaller setting. The French-Romantic tradition emphasizes legato playing. The right-hand is split into one-bar phrases but it is not clear whether this was intended by Vierne (his manuscripts are notoriously difficult to read due to his sight).

The same clarity pertains to the rest of the piece, especially the chord progressions at the end after the climax. Such thick chords can sound muddy if not played with precise, even attack and release. In some venues it would be wise to shorten the value of each chord slightly, and insert a 32nd rest between each one.
