= Louis Vierne =

French organist and composer (1870–1937)

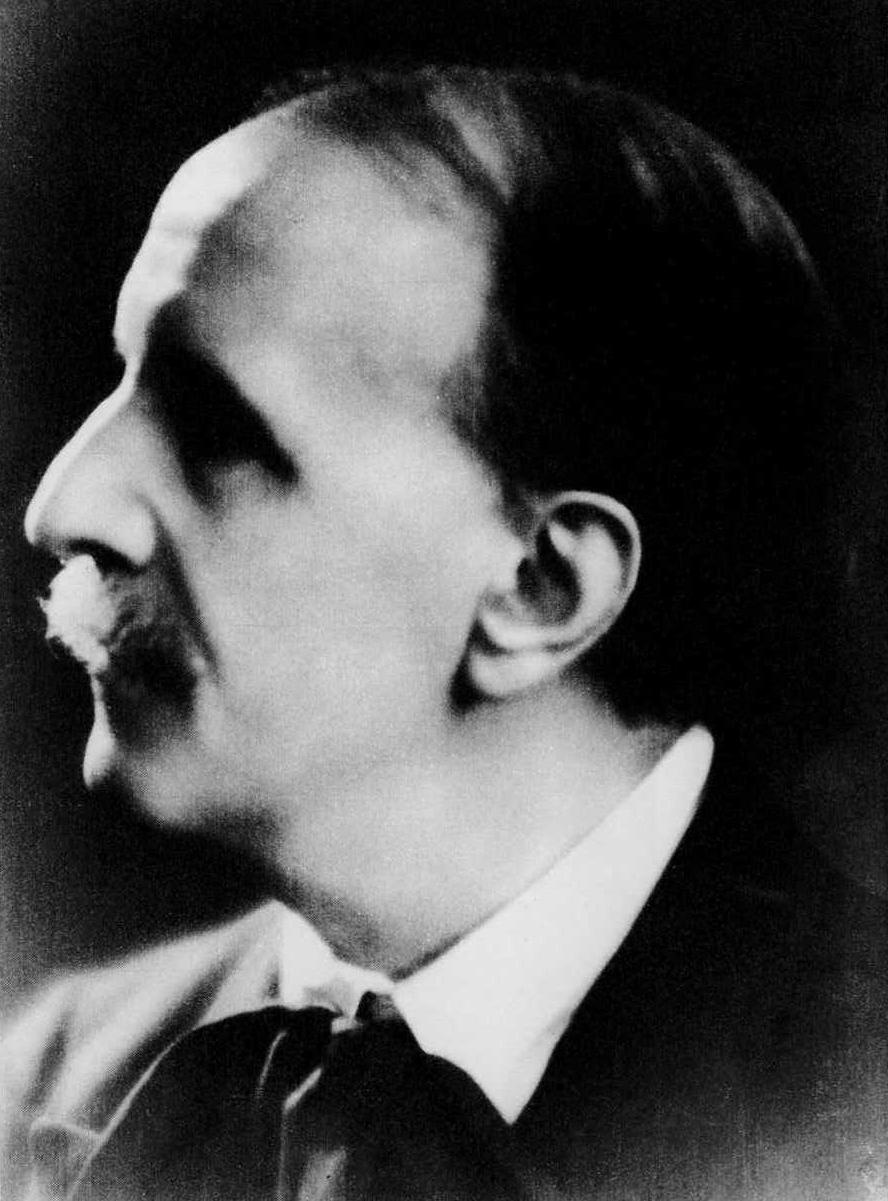
- Vierne c. 1910
- Born: Louis Victor Jules Vierne; 8 October 1870; Poitiers, France
- Died: 2 June 1937 (aged 66); Paris, France
- Education: Paris Conservatory (1894-1911) Schola Cantorum (1911-1935) École César Franck (1935-1937)
- Occupations: Organist; Composer
- Years active: 1892–1937
- Works: List of compositions
- Relatives: Charles Colin, René Vierne

Signature
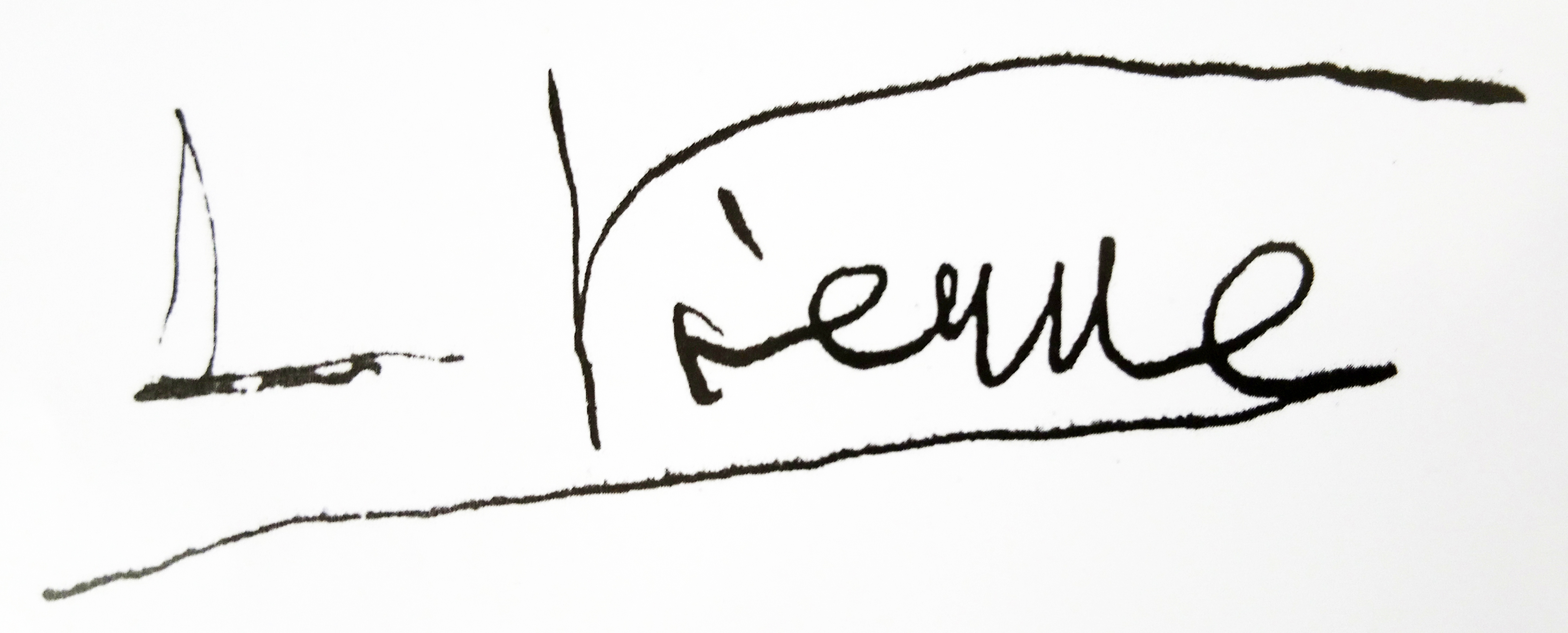

Louis Victor Jules Vierne (8 October 1870 – 2 June 1937) was a French organist and composer. He was the organist of Notre-Dame de Paris from 1900 until his death. As a composer, much of his output was organ music, including six symphonies and four suites, and works for choir and organ, including a Messe solennelle for choir and two organs. He toured Europe and the United States as a concert organist. His students included Nadia Boulanger and Maurice Duruflé.

== Life ==
Louis Vierne was born in Poitiers on 8 October 1870, the son of Henri-Alfred Vierne (1828–1886), a teacher, who became a journalist. He was editor-in-chief of the Journal de la Vienne in Poitiers, where he met his future wife, Marie-Joséphine Gervaz. The couple had four children. Louis was born nearly blind due to congenital cataracts. His unusual gift for music was discovered early. When he was only two years of age, he heard the piano for the first time: his neighbor played him a Schubert lullaby, and after he had finished young Louis promptly began to pick out the notes of the lullaby on the piano. From April 1873, his father worked for the Paris-Journal, moving with the family to Paris. At age six, Louis underwent an iridectomy in both eyes. He was then able to distinguish shapes and people, and could read large letters. He took piano lessons with Madame Gosset in Lille, where his father worked for the Lille Memorial. She transcribed the music on large staves. He also learned Braille.

In 1880, the family returned to Paris where his father worked for several newspapers including Le Figaro. Vierne studied the piano with Louis Specht, a blind teacher at the Institut National des Jeunes Aveugles (National Institute for the Young Blind). He was impressed when listening to César Franck playing the organ in 1881:

The organ played a mysterious prelude, quite unlike any I had heard at Lille; I was bowled over and became almost ecstatic. ... I could not hold back my tears. I knew nothing; I understood nothing; but my instinct was violently shaken by this expressive music echoing through every pore.

Vierne was accepted as a student of the institution in 1881. Franck recommended that he study the organ, and Vierne began lessons with Louis Lebel and Adolphe Marty. He studied harmony privately with Franck, and attended classes at the Paris Conservatoire, admitted as a full-time student in 1890. When Franck died on 8 November 1890, Charles-Marie Widor succeeded him. Vierne became his assistant in the organ class and as organist at Saint-Sulpice. Vierne was awarded first prize in the organ class of the Conservatoire in 1894. He remained assistant to Widor in the organ class, and also to his successor Alexandre Guilmant from 1896.

In July 1898, Vierne was godfather at a baptism, and Berthe Arlette Taskin the godmother. She was born in 1880, and was a contralto singing who had worked with her father, the baritone and teacher at the Conservatoire Émile-Alexandre Taskin. Vierne proposed to her on 18 July, and they got married on 20 April 1899. Widor was the organist in the church ceremony on 22 April at Saint-Sulpice. Their first son, Jacques, was born on 6 March 1900.

On 21 May 1900, Vierne won the competition for the position of titular organist at Notre-Dame de Paris. On 11 September, he gave a recital together with his wife, as part of the world fair, Exposition Universelle. He held the post until his death in 1937. Although he held one of the most prestigious organ posts in France, the organ of Notre-Dame was in a state of disrepair throughout much of his tenure at the instrument. He eventually undertook a transcontinental concert tour of North America to raise money for its restoration. The tour, which included major recitals on the famous Wanamaker Organ in Philadelphia and its smaller sister instrument, the Wanamaker Auditorium Organ in New York City, was very successful, although the trip physically drained him.

When Vierne's mother died on 25 March 1902, he moved to a larger flat on Rue ses Saints-Pères. A second son, André, was born on 6 January 1903, and a daughter, Collette, was born on 5 January 1907. In 1906, a street accident in Paris caused him to badly fracture his leg, and it was briefly thought that his leg would need to be amputated. The leg was saved, but his recovery, and the task of completely re-learning his pedal technique, took a half a year.

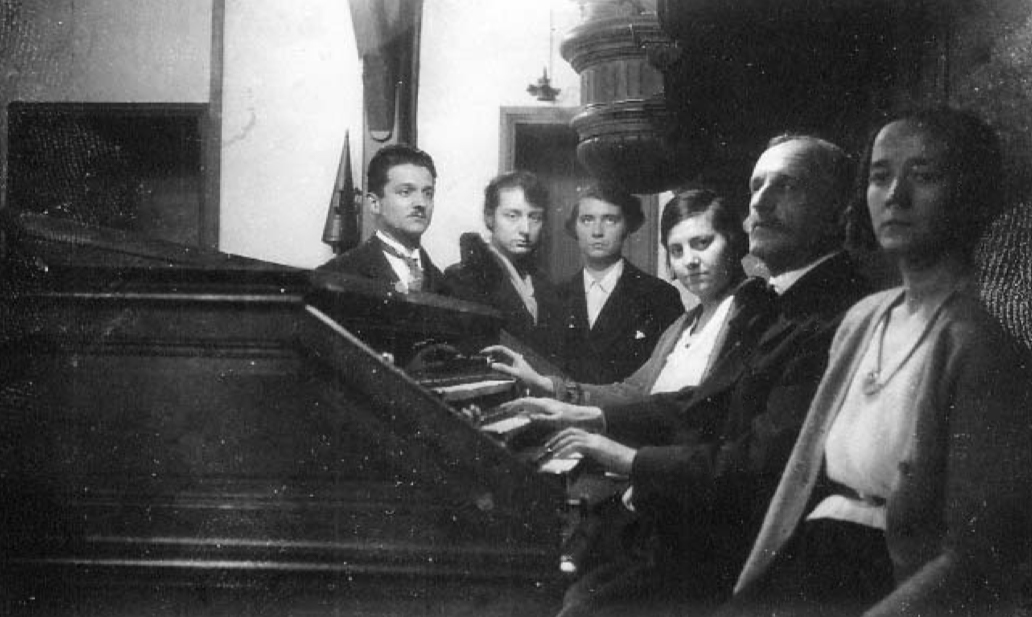
Louis Vierne at the Schola Cantorum

Vierne obtained a divorce on 4 August 1909, citing the infidelity of his wife. While she became custodian of the younger children, Jacques remained with his father.

Vierne taught, as an assistant, at the Conservatoire for nineteen years, where his students included Joseph Bonnet, Nadia Boulanger, Marcel Dupré and Henri Mulet. He was expected to succeed Guilmant as head of the organ class, but instead, Eugène Gigout was appointed, succeeded in 1926 by Dupré. Vierne taught at the Schola cantorum from 1912. His students uniformly described him as a kind, patient and encouraging teacher. Among his pupils were Augustin Barié, Edward Shippen Barnes, Lili Boulanger, André Fleury, Isadore Freed, Henri Gagnebin, Gaston Litaize, Édouard Mignan, Émile Poillot, Adrien Rougier, Alexander Schreiner, and Georges-Émile Tanguay. In the summer of 1913, he was awarded two medals from the Salon des musiciens.

With the outbreak of WW1 in 1914, Vierne's son Jacques, still a minor, wished to enlist in the military. Louis Vierne signed the necessary dispensation. Vierne went to Switzerland in 1916 for glaucoma treatment, expecting to be away for only four months, with Dupré deputy organist at Notre-Dame, but due to complications, he returned four years later. In May 1917, Jacques was transferred to the 44th Field Regiment as a driver. He committed suicide on 12 November 1917 in Prosne in the Marne. Vierne composed the Piano Quintet, Op. 42, in commemoration. His brother René died at the front on 29 May 1918, remembered in Solitude, a poem for piano.

Vierne returned to Paris in 1920. A year later, he met Madeleine Richepin, a young singer for whom he set poems by Baudelaire (Poème d'amour) which they performed in concerts together. In June 1922, he toured Switzerland, Italy and Germany. In 1924, he toured England and Scotland, and played in Lyon and Brussels. In 1927, he undertook a U.S. tour of three months with Richepin. In 1928, they spent the summer at a castle in Angers, where he composed Les Angélus, orchestrated Poème d'amour which they premiered in Paris on 1 March 1930), and began his lyrical drama Antigone. After the death of Vincent d'Indy and the conflicts that followed, he left the Schola cantorum for the César Franck School in 1931.

The government of France made Vierne a Chevalier de la Legion d'honneur in 1931.

== Death ==
Vierne died on 2 June 1937 when giving his 1,750th organ recital at Notre-Dame. He completed the main concert, which members of the audience said showed him at his full powers ("as well as he has ever played"), playing his "Stèle pour un enfant défunt" from his Triptyque, Op. 58. The closing section was to be two improvisations on submitted themes. He read the first theme in Braille, then selected the stops he would use for the improvisation. He suddenly pitched forward, and fell off the bench as his foot hit the low "E" pedal of the organ. He lost consciousness as the single note echoed throughout the church. He had thus fulfilled his oft-stated lifelong dream — to die at the console of the great organ of Notre-Dame. Maurice Duruflé, another major French organist and composer, was at his side at the time of his death.

== Music ==
See List of compositions by Louis Vierne, Category:Compositions by Louis Vierne

Final Movement of Organ Symphony No. 1 in D minor, op. 14
Performed by Marc Giacone

Carillon de Westminster, op. 54
Matthias Flierl plays the organ of St. Jakob, Rothenburg ob der Tauber, Germany ( Rieger/Austria, IV/69)

Prelude, Op 36 No. 10 (Sur une tombe)
Performed on an organ by Ulrich Metzner

Vierne had an elegant, clean style of writing that prioritized form. His harmonic language was romantically rich, but not as sentimental or theatrical as that of his early mentor César Franck. Like all of the great fin de siècle French organists, Vierne's music was very idiomatic for his chosen instrument and has inspired many Parisian organist-composers who followed him.

His output for organ includes six organ symphonies, 24 Fantasy Pieces (which includes his famous Carillon de Westminster), and Vingt-quatre pièces en style libre, among other works. There are also several chamber works (sonatas for violin and cello, a piano quintet and a string quartet for example), vocal and choral music, and a Symphony in A minor for orchestra.

== Discography ==
Organ

- Louis Vierne: Complete Organ Works: Pierre Cochereau & George C. Baker; Solstice; 7 CDs
- Louis Vierne: Complete Organ Works: Christine Kamp; Festivo; 8 CDs completed of 10
- Louis Vierne: Complete Organ Works: Ben van Oosten; MDG; 9 CDs
- Louis Vierne: Complete Organ Works: Wolfgang Rübsam; IFO Records, 2008); 8 CDs
- Organ Symphonies Nos. 1-6: Marc Dubugnon; Aethon Recordings;
- Organ Symphonies Nos. 1-6: Martin Jean; Loft Recordings
- Organ Symphonies Nos. 1-6: David Sanger; Meridian Recordings
- Organ Symphonies Nos. 1-6: Günther Kaunzinger; Koch-Schwann
- Organ Symphonies Nos. 1-6: Jeremy Filsell; Signum Classics
- Second Symphony for Organ: Christopher Houlihan
- 24 Pièces de fantaisie: Kaunzinger; Novalis; 2 CDs
- 24 Pièces De Fantaisie: Gaston Litaize; La Voix de son Maitre; 2 LPs
- 24 Pièces en style libre op. 31: Kaunzinger; Koch-Schwann; 2 CDs

Choir and organ

- Louis Vierne: Complete Choral Works: Truro Cathedral Choir; Robert Sharpe & Christopher Gray; Regent Records (2008)
- Messe solennelle: Pierre Pincemaille (organ), Ensemble de cuivres de l'Opéra de Paris, 1998 - Forlane 16786 OCLC 690092154.

Other

- Louis Vierne: Symphonie en la mineur, Poème pour piano et orchestre – François Kerdoncuff, piano; Orchestre Philharmonique de Liège; Pierre Bartholomée, conductor; Timpani (2007)
- Louis Vierne: La Musique de chambre intégrale (The Complete Chamber Music) – François Kerdoncuff, piano; Olivier Gardon, piano; Alexis Galpérine, violin; Odile Carracilly, viola; Yvan Chiffoleau, cello; Christian Moreaux, oboe; Pascale Zanlonghi, harp; Quartour Phillips; 2 CDs; Timpani (2005)
- Louis Vierne: Piano Quintet op. 42: Stephen Coombs, piano; Chilingirian Quartet; Hyperion
- Louis Vierne: Piano Quintet op. 42: Tamara Atschba, Louise Chisson, Matthias Adensamer, Alexander Znamensky, Christophe Pantillon; Gramola (2014)
- Louis Vierne: Preludes for piano op. 38: Tamara Atschba; Gramola (2014)
- Louis Vierne: L'œuvre pour piano (Works for piano) – Olivier Gardon; 2 CDs; Timpani (1995)
- Louis Vierne: Mélodies – Mireille Delunsch, soprano; François Kerdoncuff; Christine Icart, harp; Timpani (1997)
- Louis Vierne: Mélodies (volume I) – Delunsch; Kerdoncuff; Timpani (2005)
- Louis Vierne: Songs: Rachel Santesso, soprano; Roger Vignoles, piano; Andrew Reid, organ; Hugh Webb, harp; Deux-Elles

== Bibliography ==
- Smith, Rollin (1999). Louis Vierne: Organist of Notre Dame Cathedral. Pendragon Press. ISBN 1-57647-004-0.
