= Harvey Bartlett Gaul =

American musician (1881-1945)

Harvey Bartlett Gaul (b. 12 Apr 1881, Brooklyn; d. 1 December 1945, Pittsburgh, Pennsylvania) was an American composer, organist, choirmaster, lecturer, music critic, and writer from Pittsburgh. He is memorialized by an annual award — the Harvey Gaul Memorial Composition Contest (aka The Harvey Gaul Prize) — bestowed to composers for outstanding work.

He was an organist for 35 years (1910–1945) at Calvary Episcopal Church, Pittsburgh. He is well known as a composer of church music. His students included composer Gladys Rich.

== Harvey Gaul Prize winners ==
Harvey Gaul Award of the State Federation of Music Clubs (established while he was alive)

- 1942 — Catherine Latta

1947: Friends of Harvey Gaul, Inc., contest administrator and sponsor

- 1947 — Joseph W. Grant, Albuquerque, Scherzo for organ
- 1947 — Robert Elmore, Wayne, Pennsylvania, The Lord Will Come, for mixed voice anthem
- 1947 — Francis McCollin, Philadelphia, O Little Town of Bethlehem, for small choir anthem
- 1951 — Sgt. Paul Nelson, staff arranger, U.S. Military Academy, Cantata, for soprano solo with chorus, violin, cello, harp (Note: "Cantata," by Paul Nelson, was composed for the Pennsylvania College for Women and premiered by a college group April 26, 1951, in Pittsburgh.)
- 1954 — Clifford Taylor

1960: Friends of Harvey Gaul, Inc., and the Carnegie Institute of Technology Department of Music, contest co-administrators and cosponsors

- 1961 — Richard C. Moffatt (1927–1983)
- 1962 — Merrill Ellis
- 1969 — Marles Nole Smith (Hon. Mention), Two Movements for Violin and Organ
- 19?? — Fisher Tull
- 1972 — Jan Bach (tie), Three Sonnette on Woman, for tenor voice and harpsichord
- 1972 — Wesley Ward (tie), University of Pittsburgh
- 1975 — Robert E. Jager
- 1975 — Tom Wirtel (2nd place), Violin and Piano Sonata

1980: The Pittsburgh New Music Ensemble, contest administrator and sponsor

- 1983 — Robert D. Morris
- 1989 — C. Bryan Rulon
- 1991 — David Cleary
- 1997 — Derek Bermel
- 1999 — Brett Dietz (Hon. Mention)
- 2001 — Matthew Fields (Hon. Mention)
- 2001 — Pierre D. Jalbert
- 2003 — Daniel Kellogg
- 2005 — David T. Little
- 2007 — Stacy Garrop
- 2007 — Robert Paterson (Hon. Mention)
- 2007 — Wang Jie (Hon. Mention)
- 2009 — Ned McGowan
- 2009 — D. J. Sparr (Hon. Mention)
- 2009 — Clint Needham (Hon. Mention)
- 2011 — Ted Hearne
- 2011 — Dan Visconti (Hon. Mention)
- 2011 — Sean Friar (Hon. Mention)
- 2013 — Dan Visconti
- 2013 — Amy Beth Kirsten (Hon. Mention)
- 2013 — Kyle Duffee (Hon. Mention)
- 2013 — Viet Cuong (Hon. Mention)

== Notable students ==
- Garth Edmundson
- Mary Wiggins

== Family ==
Harvey Bartlett Gaul married Harriette Lester Avery (b. 1886, Youngstown, Ohio) June 13, 1908, in Cleveland, Ohio. They had a two children: a son and a daughter.

The son, James Harvey Gaul, had been an archeologist (Harvard class of 1932, PhD Harvard 1940). During World War II, as a U.S. Naval Reservist Lieutenant, he died by German firing squad in late January 1945 at the Mauthausen Concentration Camp near Linz, Austria. Having worked with the Office of Naval Intelligence, in 1944, he had been transferred to the Office of Strategic Services. He had been captured by the Germans during a combat mission in Czecho-Slovakia, a country where he had worked as an archeologist. The President of the United States presented him with the Distinguished Service Cross (Posthumously).

The daughter, Ione Gaul Walker (1914–1987), a painter, had been married to Hudson Dean Walker (1907–1976), an art dealer.

== Death ==
Harvey Gaul died December 1, 1945, of injuries from an auto accident.

== Notes and references ==
=== General references ===
- The New Grove Dictionary of American Music, four volumes, edited by H. Wiley Hitchcock and Stanley Sadie, Macmillan Press, London (1986)
- Obituaries on File, two volumes, compiled by Felice Levy, Facts on File, New York (1979)
- Baker's Biographical Dictionary of Musicians, ninth edition, edited by Laura Kuhn, Schirmer Books, New York (2001)
- Baker's Biographical Dictionary of Twentieth-Century Classical Musicians, by Nicolas Slonimsky, Schirmer Books, New York (1997)
