= William Appling =

American conductor

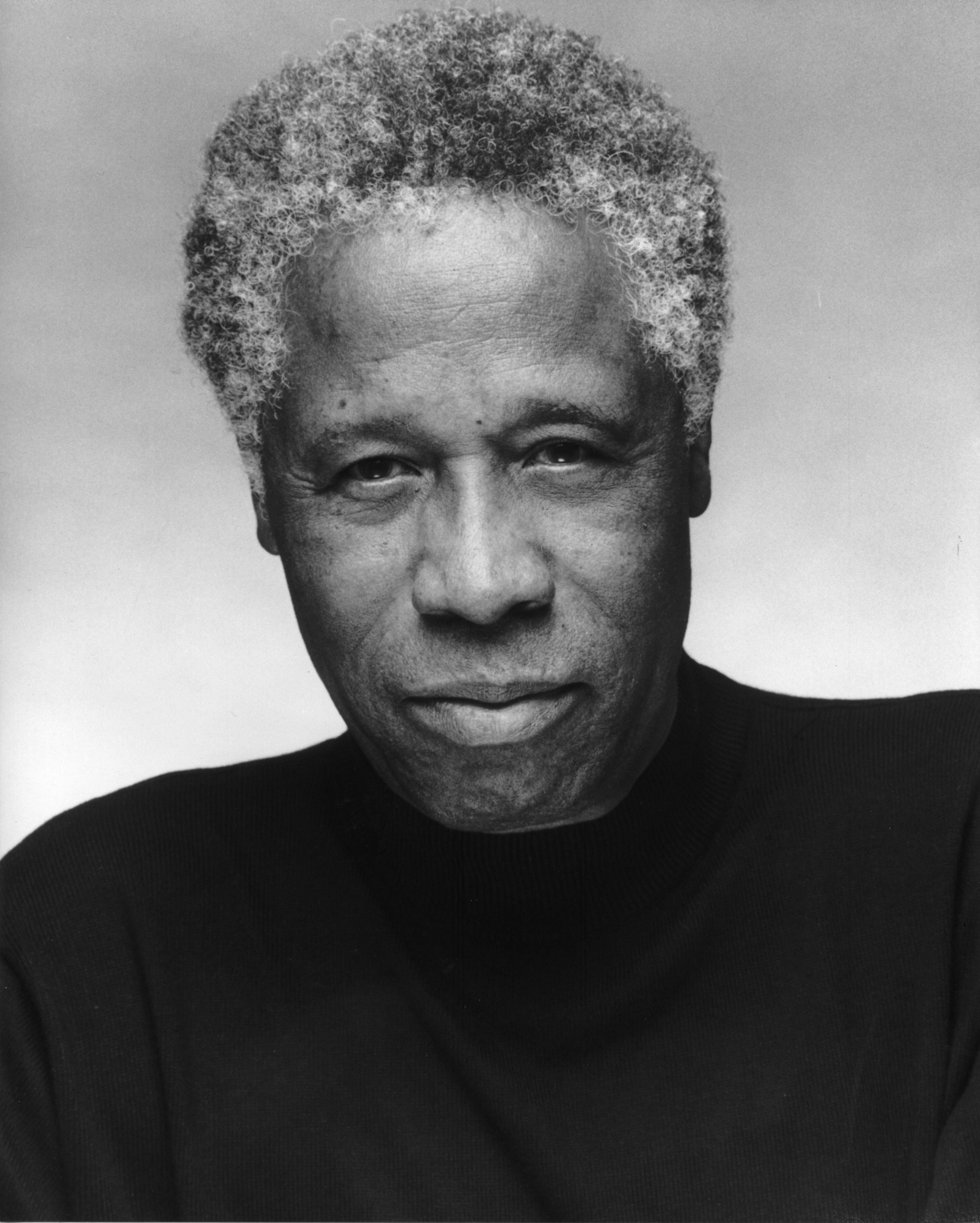
- William Appling in 1996
- Born: November 3, 1932; Cleveland, Ohio, United States
- Died: August 29, 2008 (aged 75); The Bronx, New York City, U.S.
- Occupations: Musician, conductor, pianist, educator, arranger
- Years active: 1950-2008
- Website: WilliamAppling.org

William Thomas Appling (November 3, 1932 - August 29, 2008) was a renowned American conductor, pianist, educator and arranger. As a conductor he led the William Appling Singers & Orchestra for almost twenty-five years and conducted other choirs and musical organizations, premiering new works by many American composers. As a pianist he played under the batons of conductors including Robert Shaw, Louis Lane, and Darius Milhaud, and he was the first African American to record the complete piano music of Scott Joplin. As an educator he taught at American schools and universities including Vassar College, Case Western Reserve University, the Cleveland Institute of Music and Western Reserve Academy. He made a number of recordings as both conductor and pianist, and his choral arrangements have been performed and recorded by such prominent ensembles as Chanticleer, Cantus and Dale Warland Singers.

== Biography ==
=== Early life ===
Appling was born and raised in Cleveland, Ohio, the youngest in a family of four boys and three girls. Neither his father, Bradford Appling, nor his mother, Gertrude Wynn Appling, were musicians, though they encouraged him to pursue his talent. He attended Cleveland's John Adams High School and his formal education was completed upon graduating with both a BA and MA from Case Western Reserve University. His preparation included piano study with Elizabeth Lambright, Frances Bolton Kortheuer, Egbert Fischer, and Leonard Shure, and organ study with Edwin Arthur Kraft.

== Career and influence ==
=== As conductor ===
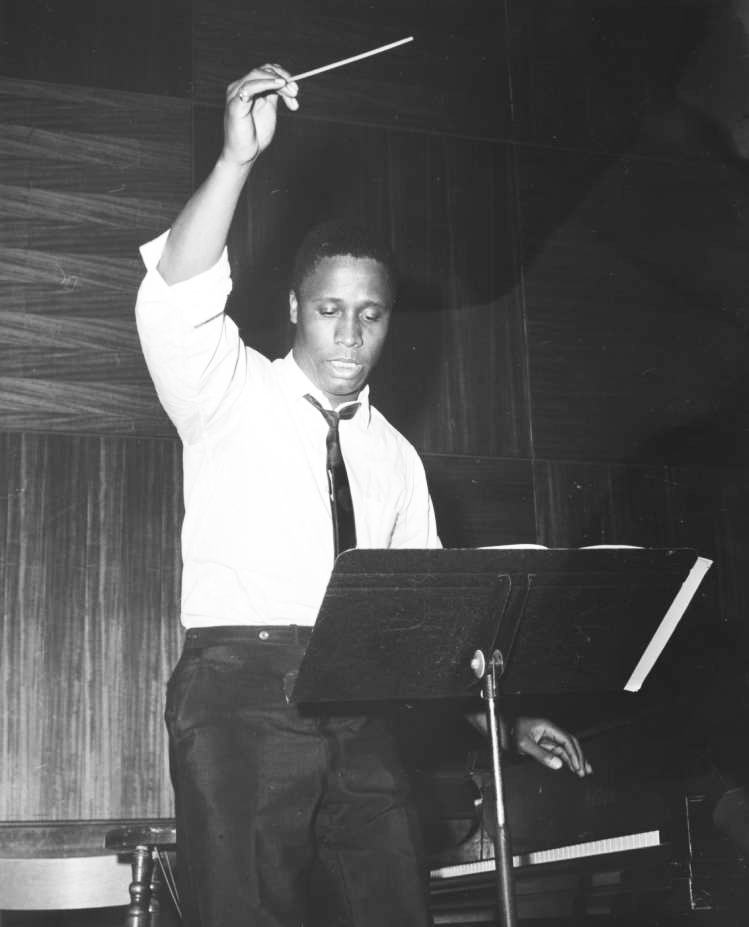
William Appling conducting in 1967

During his years in the Cleveland area, Appling was Director of the Choral Club of Glenville High School from 1955 to 1965. Under his leadership the choir became well known throughout Ohio and beyond, accepting invitations to sing at the Hollywood Bowl, the 1964 New York World's Fair and at educators' meetings in Ohio and Indianapolis. In 1965, the Cleveland Board of Education presented the Choral Club in a sold-out concert at Severance Hall.

Appling also served as the Choral Director of the Case Men's Glee Club from 1964 to 1979, West Shore Chorale from 1970 to 1981, the University Circle Singers at the Cleveland Institute of Music, and was a guest conductor and prepared choruses for the Cleveland Philharmonic Orchestra from 1966 to 1968. He also served as guest director of choral conferences throughout Ohio and the United States.

In 1965, Appling received the first Kulas Foundation Fellowship Award for Choral Conducting with the Cleveland Orchestra, in which capacity he served as assistant to Robert Shaw, then conductor of the Cleveland Orchestra Chorus.

In 1979, Appling founded the William Appling Singers & Orchestra (WASO), a professional ensemble performing primarily choral works of all periods and styles. The group's premiere performance was at the Cleveland Institute of Music on March 9, 1980, presenting an all-Mozart program. WASO premiered the works of many contemporary American composers, including those by Richard Hundley, Donald Erb, and Richard Edward Wilson. In Ohio, WASO appeared in concert at Severance Hall, Blossom Music Center, the Cleveland Museum of Natural History, the Cleveland Museum of Art, and numerous church concerts. The group was noted for its performances of J.S. Bach's Mass in B minor and during the holiday seasons their presentation of Handel's Messiah became a welcome tradition in the Cleveland area. Appling and WASO also collaborated on projects with the prominent musician, sociologist and musicologist Zelma Watson George in community outreach programs such as A Joyful Noise, which was presented at Cleveland's legendary Karamu House and Mount Zion Congregational Church.

Appling was music director and conductor of the premiere of Leslie Adams's opera, Blake, in a 70-minute concert version at the Cleveland Play House in June, 1985.

On February 22, 1990, Appling was guest artist for A Night to Remember, sponsored by the University of Akron in conjunction with the university's Black Cultural Center to recognize the contributions of Blacks to the arts. The program included excerpts from Porgy and Bess and a tribute to the late choreographer Alvin Ailey.

After moving to New York in 1990 to become Director of Choral Activities at Vassar College in Poughkeepsie, New York, Appling re-established WASO on the east coast where the ensemble performed throughout the 1990s and early 2000s. From 1991 to 1995, Appling and WASO were associated with the Bard Music Festival, founded by Leon Botstein. In 1991, he prepared the chorus for the Festival's performance of Felix Mendelssohn's choral symphony Lobgesang. The Bard Festival focused on composer Richard Strauss in 1992, and about the festival critic Edward Said wrote in The Nation magazine, "For me, there was one particularly jolting work that stood out over all the others. Performed with rapt concentration by the William Appling Singers under Appling, a remarkable choral conductor, it was heard for the first time in the United States: Strauss's Deutsche Motette, Op. 62, composed in 1913, revised in 1943." In 1993, he prepared the chorus in performances that were part of the Antonín Dvořák festival in New York City. 1994's Bard Festival was devoted to Robert Schumann, and in 1995, Appling and WASO were part of the Bard Music Festival's Rediscoveries - Béla Bartók and His World.

On October 7, 1996, WASO was the only professional musical organization in the United States to present a concert celebrating the 250th anniversary of the birth of William Billings, America's first great native-born composer at Christ & Saint Stephen's Episcopal Church in New York City.

=== As pianist ===
William Appling enjoyed an active career as a concert pianist, giving many recitals in the Cleveland area during the 1950s and '60s. On April 1, 1962, with Robert Shaw conducting the Cleveland Orchestra at Severance Hall, Appling was piano soloist in George Gershwin's Rhapsody in Blue. On August 11, 1962, he performed Rhapsody in Blue in a Pops Concert in Public Auditorium with Louis Lane conducting the Cleveland Orchestra. Appling also appeared as part of the Brooklyn Museum Concerts Program series in January, 1963, and in solo recital at The Town Hall, New York City, in April, 1964. He also played Tchaikovsky's Piano Concerto No. 1 under the baton of Hyman Schandler and the Cleveland Women's Orchestra in 1965.

Appling also appeared at the Aspen Music Festival under Darius Milhaud and in duo recital with tenor Seth McCoy and his then wife, soprano Anita Appling. Early in his career, in 1952, he appeared as accompanist with the legendary composer and musician W. C. Handy in a program sponsored by the National Association of Negro Musicians.

During the 2000s, while working on his Scott Joplin project, Appling performed several times at venues in New York City and Massachusetts. He performed a program of Scott Joplin on March 16, 2004, at the Church of the Holy Apostles in Manhattan when the church's soup kitchen served its 5 millionth meal.

=== As arranger ===
Appling arranged a number of Negro spirituals for chorus. Two of these arrangements are published by J.W. Pepper & Son: We Shall Walk Through the Valley in Peace, and Yonda' Come Day. His arrangement of We Shall Walk Through the Valley in Peace has been widely performed and is included on recordings by such prominent ensembles as Chanticleer on its 1994 Teldec recording, Where the Sun Will Never Go Down, and by The Dale Warland Singers' Harvest Home from 2005 on the Gothic label. The arrangement also appears on WASO's own 2000 recording, Shall We Gather, on Albany Records. A recording of We Shall Walk Through the Valley in Peace, with an arrangement by Appling and Joseph Jennings from a live concert featuring Chanticleer and Cantus, has been widely viewed.

=== As educator ===
Appling served on the faculties of Case Western Reserve University from 1964 to 1979 and the Cleveland Institute of Music from 1961 to 1970. He joined the music department at Western Reserve Academy in Hudson, Ohio, in 1965, and was appointed head of the department in 1971, serving in that capacity until 1989.

While at Western Reserve Academy, Appling "helped sculpt the music program into one of the region's preeminent programs." [WRA note] In addition to musical instruction, he gave the high school students numerous opportunities to perform both at the school's Hudson, Ohio, campus and at outside venues. In 1972, nine members of the WRA Glee Club joined the Case Men's Glee Club on a ten-day concert tour of Europe. The WRA chorus and glee club sang at Christmas at Stan Hywet, an annual series of classical programs, and the school's music department organized annual Music Festivals and Messiah Sings.

In 1972, Appling founded and directed Summer Music Experience, an international six-week program offering intensive music training and performance experience to gifted students of high school age. The music camp/festival involved members of the Cleveland Orchestra and included visiting artists and master classes with Robert Shaw, Grant Johannesen, Louis Lane, André Watts, Phyllis Curtin, Matthias Bamert and many others.

In June, 1989, Appling was dismissed by Western Reserve Academy and his firing was met with protests and objections by a large number of the school's students, parents and alumni and members of the public. A defense fund raised several thousand dollars to help defray legal fees, and he and the school negotiated a financial settlement in 1990. The Cleveland Plain Dealer wrote an extended article which included speculations about reasons for the dismissal, but these were never publicly disclosed by Appling or the school.

In 1990, Appling was appointed Director of Choral Activities at Vassar College, a position he held until 1996, where he directed the Vassar College Choir and Vassar College Madrigal Singers in many performances. Under Appling's leadership, the Madrigal Singers also performed away from the school's campus in concerts in New York City, at the 1991 Four Freedoms Medal awards ceremony in Hyde Park, New York, and other locations. In 1996, Appling organized a panel discussion entitled Mutiny on the Amistad: The Art of Retelling. Panelists included the prominent African American composers Hale Smith and Anthony Davis and concerts including works by both composers were presented.

== Recordings ==
=== As conductor ===
Under Appling's direction, the Glenville High School Choral Club released a self-titled LP in 1962 on the Delta Records of Ohio label. The album included a wide variety of classical choral works as well as three traditional spirituals arranged by Appling.

In 1969, the Case Men's Glee Club under Appling's direction released an LP, Cantate Domino, through Recording Studios Inc. The album included a wide variety works including compositions by Hans Leo Hassler, Vincent Persichetti, and Appling's own arrangements of four Negro spirituals.

In 1970, Appling conducted The University Circle Singers in Donald Erb's Kyrie for chorus, percussion and electronic tape, on a recording of contemporary American music, Metamorphosis, released on the Ars Nova Ars Antiqua label.

William Appling Singers & Orchestra released a number of recordings including Wake Ev'ry Breath, a CD on New World Records of music by William Billings; Stresses in the Peaceable Kingdom, choral music of Richard Wilson; Shall We Gather, a recording of American hymns and spirituals; and The Revenge of Hamish, choral music of William McClelland, all on Albany Records.

=== As pianist ===
Appling collaborated with soprano A. Grace Lee Mims on Spirituals, an album of Negro spirituals released in 1981 on H&GM Records. A number of the selections on the recording were arranged by Appling.

William Appling Plays Scott Joplin & J.S. Bach, Appling's recording of works by J. S. Bach (the Italian Concerto and the First Partita) and Scott Joplin (seven compositions) was released by Albany Records in 2010.

Over a two-year period from 2006 to 2007, Appling recorded all of Scott Joplin's compositions for solo piano, a total of 46 works. Scott Joplin, The Complete Rags, Waltzes & Marches, a 4-CD set, was released on April 1, 2017, the centenary of Scott Joplin's death. The recordings, produced by WASO, were the first ever "complete Joplin" recorded by an African American pianist and received widespread notice. In 2019, Appling's recording of Joplin's composition "Solace (A Mexican Serenade)" was featured by The New York Times in "5 Minutes That Will Make You Love he Piano." Times classical music reporter Michael Cooper wrote that, "With its aching harmonies and seamless blend of Latin rhythms, ragtime, Romantic flourish and ineffable nostalgia, this is one of those rare pieces whose emotional impact can withstand familiarity; it gets me every time." Appling's recording of Joplin's famous The Entertainer is featured at the National Museum of African American Music in Nashville, Tennessee in its exhibition, "Rivers of Rhythm Pathways - The Evolution of African American Music Traditions." Appling's recording of Joplin's Maple Leaf Rag is featured in a special video by the Morgan Library & Museum regarding the original publishing contract for the composition, signed by Joplin himself in 1899 and now in the Morgan's archives.

== Awards and honors ==
Over his career, Appling received a number of awards including First Prize in Piano from the National Association of Negro Musicians (NANM) in 1954. He also won a scholarship in 1947 (at age fourteen) from the NANM for one year's study with Edwin Arthur Kraft.

In 1965, Appling was awarded the first Kulas Foundation Fellowship Award for Choral Conducting with the Cleveland Orchestra during the tenures of George Szell and Robert Shaw.

In November, 1998, Appling was inducted into the Glenville Hall of Fame in Glenville, Cleveland as an "Arts-Legacy" in a ceremony taking place at the Western Reserve Historical Society.

Shortly after William Appling's death in 2008, the Board of William Appling Singers & Orchestra along with Appling's former students, friends and colleagues began planning an event in his honor which would feature musical performances and spoken tributes and remembrances. Celebrating William Appling was held at the Riverside Church in New York City on June 21, 2009. A second event, A Tribute to William Appling: The Celebration Continues! was held on June 29, 2013, at the Church of the Holy Apostles in New York City.

In the spring of 2012, Western Reserve Academy presented the first William T. Appling Memorial Concert honoring Appling's enormous contribution to the school and to music, and since then the concert has been an annual event at the academy.
