= American Lullaby =

American Lullaby was a song published by Gladys Rich in 1932. The narrator of the piece is a nursemaid, who is putting the baby in her care to sleep.

Some might argue that "American Lullaby" is a saddening commentary on how achieving the “American Dream” often ends with unintended results. In this specific case, the baby's parents have achieved what is perceived to be the perfect life. Daddy is a successful stockbroker whose family has relative wealth; Mommy is gone to her bridge party and does not seem to interact with her child, allowing the nursemaid to provide what little nurturing her child receives.

Others might argue that the lullaby is simply a portrait of upper-middle class American life in the mid-20th Century and the family is having a hard time so the nursemaid is helping them, when the father is trying to keep the bank or somebody away from taking the money, while the mother is trying to get money for a child at a Casino

American Lullaby was dedicated to Helen-Claire Moyle, and its copyright is currently held by G. Schirmer (Inc.).

The legendary Canadian contralto Maureen Forrester recorded the song twice. Once on her classic 1967 album "A Charm of Lullabies" with pianist John Newmark and again in 1998 for a cd titled "Lullabies" with John Arpin.

This piece has been performed professionally by Clarissa Ocampo, Bridgette Cooper-Anderson, Jay Pierson, John O'Brien and The Louise Toppin Trio.

== Lyrics ==
Hush-a-bye you sweet little baby and don't you cry anymore. Daddy is down at his stockbroker's office a keeping the wolf from the door. Nursie will raise the window shade high, So you can see the cars whizzing by. Home in a hurry each daddy must fly To a baby like you.

Hush-a-bye you sweet little baby and close those pretty blue eyes. Mother has gone to her weekly bridge party to get her wee baby the prize. Nursie will turn the radio on So you can hear a sleepy-time song, Sung by a lady whose poor heart must long For a baby like you.
