= Lynnwood Farnam =

Canadian organist (1885–1930)

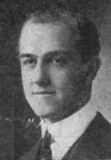

Lynnwood Farnam (January 13, 1885 – November 23, 1930) was a Canadian organist who became the preeminent organist in North America in the 1920s until his death. He was influential in promoting the music of Bach, and also championed French organ music contemporary to his day. He became acquainted with the most important American and European organists of his day, and upon his early death, several major works were dedicated to his memory. He was known for his superb technical ability and knowledge of organ registration, but he avoided performances intended to "show off" the organist, preferring the attention to be drawn to the music.

== Biography ==
Walter Lynnwood Farnam was born on January 13, 1885, in Sutton, Quebec, Canada, into a family of farmers and inventors. He was named Walter after his great-great-grandfather, who gained a fortune for a plow he had invented. However, to his friends and family he was always called "Lynnwood" or Lynn. His father was Arlington I. Farnam, a farmer and inventor who also was an amateur musician of no particular talent. His mother, Bertha Curtis née Wood, was a highly skilled musician with a noted ability for memorization. He was raised on a farm in Dunham, Quebec, where both his parents had deep family ties, with the obligatory farm chores. His first musical instructor was his mother, and then from two teachers at Dunham Ladies College. Farnam gave credit to one of these teachers, George W. Cornish, as giving him the foundation for technical ability for which he became famous. The first verifiable public performance took place at the age of ten. He began giving piano lessons of his own by the age of eleven. In 1900 he was awarded the Montreal Scholarship, enabling him to attend the Royal College of Music for three years studying under James Higgs, W. S. Hoyte, F. A. Sewell, Herbert Sharpe and Franklin Taylor. He had spent three months in intense preparation for the scholarship exam, but the day of the examination and performance left him nervous. His father relieved his nerves with encouragement and by massaging Lynnwood's fingers, for which Lynnwood expressed gratitude. Because he excelled in his studies he earned an additional year of tuition at the Royal College.

His first professional position as an organist was at St. James Methodist Church in Montreal, which he held from 1904 to 1905. He then moved as organist to St. James the Apostle, also in Montreal, from 1905 to 1908. He was the organist of Christ Church Cathedral in Montreal from October 1908 until August 1913, and there he gave a series of annual Lenten concerts, and also directed choir performances. His final year in Montreal also saw him begin teaching organ at McGill Conservatory.

While located in Montreal he made trips to Boston, playing many organs there and befriending fellow organists. He was then appointed organist and choirmaster at Emmanuel Church in Boston after an audition from which he demonstrated an ability to play from memory more than 200 pieces in his repertoire, from Bach fugues to current works. At this post he became famous in the United States, and began to acquire an international reputation as a great organist. An organ was built to his specifications which at the time of completion (1918) was the third-largest organ on the North American continent. He was personally at his happiest in Boston, where his talents were greatly appreciated, the organ he played on was built to his specifications, and where he made close personal friendships and acquired financial benefactors that lasted the rest of his life.

Despite his satisfaction with Boston, Farnam felt that New York City was the cultural hub that allowed him further artistic development. That he was offered a position with thrice his current salary probably factored into his decision to leave his appointment in Boston and accept a position at Fifth Avenue Presbyterian Church in New York City. Before he could fill the post he immediately resigned to serve in the Canadian Army. He had applied to join the Canadian army much earlier at the outset of Canadian participation in the First World War, but he had been rejected because of eye impediments. However, by 1918 the Canadian Army was enlisting men who had previously been deferred. In the Canadian Infantry he went to Wales, but ill health prevented him from going to the continent to participate in the fighting. While there he continued his organ performances. After leaving the army the position at First Presbyterian was re-extended to him and he accepted and then held residence for a year, continuing to give full concerts and weekly half-hour recitals preceding Sunday afternoon services. His tenure at this location was unpleasant for him, he was unappreciated by the congregation and had an acrimonious relationship with the music committee.

In 1920 he then became an organist at the Church of the Holy Communion in Manhattan's Flatiron District, which he held until the time of his death. This position suited him well. It was a small congregation but had a surplus of monetary support. The church allowed Farnam to embark on extensive worldwide tours, feeling the world in general would be the beneficiary.

In June 1923 Farnam made his first performing tour of Europe, in England and France. While in France he spent time with Louis Vierne at Notre-Dame de Paris. October 1923 saw Farnam making his first radio broadcast. He commenced a second European tour May 1924, and stayed in the home of Marcel Dupré for a time. On February 7, 1927, he commenced a sequence of weekly all-Bach recitals at the Church of the Holy Communion in New York. In the late 1920s he toured the United States extensively, ranging from the Deep South to the Midwest to the Northwest.

He gained an excellent reputation for teaching, and so became head of the organ department of the Curtis Institute of Music in 1927, where he taught weekly until the time of his death. He made organ rolls for the Aeolian company in February 1930, of particular importance in that Farnam made no phonograph recordings. The Cincinnati Conservatory of Music awarded Farnam an honorary Doctor of Music June 20, 1930. His last European tour took place the next month, July 1930. It was on this tour that Farnam began to recognize the symptoms of what would prove to be a fatal disease, losing all appetite, feeling highly lethargic, and experiencing chest pains. He sought medical treatment in August, having arrived back in the United States. By October 6 he was suffering severely. Farnam's last recital took place on October 12, 1930, at the Church of the Holy Communion. He was in pain during the concert and was directly thereafter brought to a hospital where he was diagnosed with liver cancer. He died in New York on November 23, 1930, of liver cancer shortly after receiving surgery for gallstones. His cremains are inurned in the Great Mausoleum of Forest Lawn Memorial Park in Glendale, California.

== Style ==
Farnam was the first North American organist to play the entire repertoire of Johann Sebastian Bach's organ works, a feat not repeated until E. Power Biggs completed the cycle in September 1937. Farnam considered Bach to be the greatest writer of organ music but had a particular fondness of French organ music from his own time, especially that of Louis Vierne. Farnam also performed programs consisting of the entire organ works of Brahms and Franck. He rarely played music that had been transcribed for organ, but performed music originally composed for it. Edward Moore of the Chicago Tribune remarked upon Farnam's rhythm, comparing the dance-ability of his performance of Handel's organ concertos to Paul Whiteman. He viewed his concerts and recitals as an extension of the church's work, and disdained "theatrical" playing in a sacred setting.

Farnam learned new pieces first by playing slowly on the piano, and working out precise fingering. Then he transferred the piece to a small organ at his residence, to gain the feel for the organ keyboard. Once he felt he had mastered the piece technically, he then moved to the full organ at his disposal, where he worked out the registration per the specifications of the instrument upon which he was performing. His command of registration and tone was considered unparalleled. Farnam would not improvise in public, but concentrated on bringing attention to the pieces he was performing through technical perfection without emphasizing his virtuoso capabilities. He composed a singular piece, Toccata on 'O filii et filiae', which he used to test the sonic capabilities of the organs he was to play.

Farnam was proud of his Canadian heritage and ensured that "Canadian Organist" was placed on programs under his name.

== Legacy ==
In promotional material, Farnam was described as "The Premiere Organist of the North American Continent", a claim which was never challenged in his lifetime and a reputation he held decades later. He deserves consideration in conversations regarding the greatest North American organists.

Many composers wrote music for or dedicated to Farnam, including:

- Marcel Dupré, who considered Farnam the world's greatest organist, dedicated the first movement of 7 Pièces, Op. 27, to Farnam's memory.
- Vierne dedicated his Organ Symphony No. 6 in B minor to Farnam. Farnam had helped popularize Vierne's Carillon de Westminster.
- Gustave Ferrari dedicated his Entree Festaval to Farnam.
- The 21st office, "Dominica IV post Pascha", from Charles Tournemire's L'Orgue Mystique, dated June 14 1930.
- Seth Bingham's Suite No. 1 for Organ, opus 25.
- Leo Sowerby's Symphony in G major for organ is "dedicated to my friend Lynnwood Farnam, who is certainly the greatest organist I ever knew"
- Karg-Elert's In Memoriam for organ is dedicated to Farnam
- Harry Jepson's Masquerade is dedicated to Farnam.

After his death a memorial was erected at the Third Avenue Church in Saskatoon and bronze bust of Farnam by Alfred Laliberté was placed at Christ Church Cathedral in Montreal upon the first anniversary of his death. In 1999 the bust was permanently loaned to the Faculty of Music of McGill University, where it now rests in the lounge of Pollack Concert Hall.

== Personal life ==
Farnam never married. During his studies in London he wrote that he wished he had "a girl", but he never pursued a serious courtship. He was very close to both his parents and to his sister who was two years younger. He was also close to his Aunt Alice.

== Pupils of Lynnwood Farnam ==
Farnam's several pupils included:

- Arthur L. Bates
- Garth Edmundson
- Katherine Fowler
- Alfred Greenfield
- H. William Hawke
- Alexander McCurdy
- Ruth Barrett Phelps
- Harold Ramsay
- Frederick Silvester
- Carl Weinrich
- Ernest White
- Clarence Mader
- Helen Hewitt
- Robert Cato
- Robert Noehren
- Paul Robinson
- William Thaanum
