= Garth Edmundson =

American musician (1892–1971)

- Born: 11 Apr 1892
- Origin: United States
- Died: 2 Apr 1971
- Occupation(s): Organist, Composer, Music director, and Music teacher

Garth C. Edmundson (b. 11 Apr 1892, Pennsylvania; d. 2 Apr 1971, New Castle, Pennsylvania) was an American organist, composer, music director, and music teacher.

== Formal training ==
Edmundson studied music in Pittsburgh, New York, London, Paris, and at the Leipzig Conservatory. His instructors were Harvey Gaul, Lynnwood Farnam, Joseph Bonnet, and Isidor Philipp.

== Professional career ==
Edmundson was an organist, music teacher, and director of music in several churches and schools in western Pennsylvania. Edmundson began his career as church organist and minister of music at First Presbyterian Church in New Castle and played special masses at St. Mary Church. He composed hundreds of compositions for organ, including:

- Impression Gothiques
- Imagery in Tableaux
- Vom Himmel Hoch

== Honors and awards ==
- Honorary doctorate degree – Doctor of Music, Westminster College, New Wilmington, Pennsylvania.

== Affiliations ==
Edmundson was a member of ASCAP and Trinity Episcopal Church. He also was a 32nd Degree Mason.

== Selected published works ==
- Christus Advenit (Christmas Suite No.2) (for organ):
  1. Adeste Fideles
  2. Veni Emmanuel
  3. Vom Himmel hoch
- Four Modern Preludes on Old Chorals (Vater Unser - Eudoxia - Evan - Vom Himmel hoch)
- Hail the Day (Ascension), (1956) anthem for mixed voices
- Humoresque Fantastique
- To the Setting Sun
- Toccata on "How Brightly Shines the Morning Star"
- Toccata-Prelude on "St. Ann's"
- Seven Modern Preludes on Ancient Themes for organ, J. Fischer & Bro. (1937). Includes:
  1. Chorus Novae Jerusalem (Ye Choirs, O New Jerusalem)
  2. Pange Lingua Gloriosi (Sing My Tongue)
  3. Veni Creator Spiritus (Come Holy Spirit)
  4. Ecce Jam Noctis (Lo! the Night)
  5. Vexilla Regis (The Royal Banner)
  6. Dies Irae (Day of Wrath)
  7. Divinium Mysterium (Of the Fathers Love)
- Garth Edmundson, In Modum Antiquum, Book Two, J. Fischer & Bro. (1936); Includes:

Pandean Pastoral
Caravan of the Magi
Humuresque Gracieuse
In Silent Night
Mereauesque Toccata
A selection of Edmundson's printed works is available here http://www.onlinesheetmusic.com/garth-edmundson-a77827.aspx?type=list

== Audio samples ==
- Vom Himmel Hoch, Toccata, Prelude IV from Christus Advenit (Christmas Suite No. 2), based on the German Christmas carol "Vom Himmel Hoch"
1. Video on YouTube, Graham Barber, organist, Schulze organ at St. Bartholomew's Church, Armley, England
2. Video on YouTube, Anthony Hunt, organist, Cathedral Church of St. John the Evangelist, Salford, Greater Manchester, England
3. Video on YouTube, Andrew Lucas, organist, St. Paul's Cathedral, London
4. Video on YouTube, Ralph Cupper, organist
