= Les Adams =

Les or Leslie Adams may refer to:

- Les Adams (politician) (born 1974), American politician from Virginia
- Les Adams (rugby league) (1909–1945), English rugby league footballer
- Les Adams (DJ) (1955–2019), English DJ and producer
- Leslie Adams (composer) (1932–2024), American composer
