= Merrill Leroy Ellis =

American classical composer

- Born: 9 December 1916; Cleburne, Texas, US
- Died: 12 July 1981 (aged 64); Denton, Texas
- Education: University of Oklahoma
- Occupations: composer and academic
- Employer: University of North Texas College of Music

Merrill Leroy Ellis (9 December 1916 Cleburne, Texas – 12 July 1981 Denton, Texas) was an American composer, performer, and experimental music researcher. He is most known for his work with electronic (analog) and intermedia compositions, new compositional techniques, development of new instruments, and exploration of new notation techniques for scoring and performance.

== Education ==
- 1939 – Bachelor of Music, University of Oklahoma
- 1940 – Master of Music Education, University of Oklahoma
- Graduate studies, University of Missouri

Ellis studied privately with Roy Harris, Spencer Norton (1909–1978), and Charles Garland (University of Missouri) and Darius Milhaud (1957)

== Personal life ==
Ellis was married to Willa Naomi Ellis (née Wiggins), who held a BFA in Music Education and taught piano from their home. Together they raised five children, teaching each one to play two instruments.

In 1974 Ellis travelled by train across the southwest from Texas to California with his wife, children and grandchildren while filming footage for his intermedia composition "Trains - Used to Run Late."

== Career ==
Merrill Ellis taught band, orchestra, music theory, and composition in Texas and Missouri at the high school (Hickman High School and Lefors Independent School District), junior college (Joplin Junior College (now Missouri Southern State University and Moberly Junior College)and college level (Christian College now Columbia College (Missouri) from 1943 until 1962.

In 1962, Ellis founded the electronic music program at the University of North Texas College of Music shortly after he began teaching there. North Texas acquired its first Moog Machine for use in Merrill Ellis' studio, late 1965. Ellis was a pioneer in composing and performing live multimedia music on Moogs from the mid to late 1960s. He worked with Robert Moog to design the second Moog synthesizer ever made to be portable for him and his doctoral students to use during performances. Robert Moog gave a nod to Ellis by naming this second model the E-II. It was Moog's second synthesizer and Ellis' second Moog. In March 1970, a Tucson newspaper (Tucson Daily Citizen) mentioned that he had brought a Moog (smaller than the North Texas studio model) for a live performance of "Kaleidoscope."

The electronic music center at North Texas was one of the few in the southwest in the early 1960s. According to Ellis in a 1970 interview, Columbia-Princeton Electronic Music Center (in New York City) was the largest and oldest. Yale University, University of Toronto, and University of Illinois had prolific computer music labs, too.

The Center for Experimental Music and Intermedia (CEMI) at North Texas is an outgrowth of his accomplishments. When the College of Music designed and erected a new music complex in the late 1970s, a "new music" theater was designed and named "The Merrill Ellis Intermedia Theater" or "MEIT."

== Selected compositions ==
Instrumental works

- "And Ruth Said," sacred songs (medium voice) with piano (Aug. 15, 1947); OCLC 42755062
- "Brass Quartet," for 2 trumpets, tenor trombone, bass trombone (manuscript dated 1951)
- "Bridge Game," for string quartet; OCLC 48546112, 28445907
- "Cape "G" Melody," for oboe, viola, cello, with optional part for double bass (manuscript dated 1951)
- "Classical Combo," a septet + one; OCLC 27956521
- Dizzy Kate Piano Suite, (Sept. 19, 1947); OCLC 42755031

1. "Introducing Kate"
2. "Kate Was Very Modal"
3. "She Sas Long and Slim and Loved to Dance"
4. "Kate Lived at the Corner of 4th and 5th"
5. "My, My, Dizzy Kate"

- "A Dream Fantasy," an intermedia piece; may use dancers if desired; for clarinet (some passages may be performed on saxophone), percussion, tape, and 2 reels of 16 mm. film; 35 mm. slides optional, C. Fischer (1976); OCLC 3308993, 869657148
- "Duets," for flute & piano (1969)
- "Ecce homo," for cello & piano (1970); OCLC 51169319
- "Einyah [Festival]," for piano, trumpet, and percussion;
- Etudes for Piano, ("to Sis, Jan 5, 1951"); OCLC 49981198
1. Etude I: "Dorian"
2. Etude II: "Phrygian"
3. Etude III: "Lydian"
- "Fantasy for Organ" (1969); OCLC 37149337
- "Five Plus One," for woodwind quintet – flute, oboe, clarinet, horn, and bassoon, with optional double bass (1969)
- "General William Booth Enters Into Heaven," for SATB chorus with instrumental ensemble, text by V. Lindsay (1954)
- "Incantations," for two pianos (1969); OCLC 27876766
- "Mutations," a multi-media composition for brass quintet, prepared electronic tape, 16mm film projection and 35mm slide projections, Delaware Water Gap, Pennsylvania, Shawnee Press (1972); OCLC 17579310, 223198454

for 2 trumpets, horn, bass trombone and tuba

- "Pastoral," for harp (1970); OCLC 367625536
- "Pastoral," for & piano (1970)
- "Piece," for trumpet & piano (1950); OCLC 29170766
- "Celebration," for flute, oboe, clarinet, bassoon, percussion, tape, lasers, and visual events (commissioned by Baylor University, Richard Shanley & Society for Commissioning New Music) American Music Center, New York (1980); OCLC 25457601
- "Dream of the Rode," for tape and 16 mm film;

Premiered Nov 6, 1973, Montevallo University, Alabama; Marsue Burns, PhD (1935–2007), libretto; Carroll Young Rich, PhD (1933– ), Anglo-Saxon translation for the spoken parts (Marsue and Carroll were members of the UNT English faculty)

- "Feedback Fantasy"
- "The Great Gift"
- "Kaleidoscope;" OCLC 17011680
- "Mutations," Shawnee Press, Delaware Water Gap, Pennsylvania (1972); OCLC 17579310, 924030337
- "Nostalgia," for orchestra, film & theatrical events; OCLC 2881943, 24827789
- "Oboe Quintet"
- "Organ Fantasy"
- "Scintillation," solo piano; General Words and Music Co., Park Ridge, Illinois (1976); OCLC 9296147, 28152355, 3398362, 756990300
- "Tomorrow Texas," North Texas Composer's Archive, Denton (1965)

Opera

- "The Sorcerer," for solo baritone, tape, film, slides, and chorus (with optional live band); Shawnee Press, Delaware Water Gap, Pennsylvania (1973); OCLC 3267795

Film and television

- "The Choice is Ours," intermedia work for 2 films, slides, tape & audience participation

== Awards & honors ==
- 1962 — Harvey Gaul Prize, Friends of Harvey Gaul, Inc., and the Carnegie Institute of Technology, Department of Music, for the composition, Organ Fantasy, performed in Carnegie Hall
- 1964 — Texas Federation of Music Clubs Competition, First Prize for "The Great Gift"
- 1965 — Texas Federation of Music Clubs Competition, First Prize for "Oboe Quintet"
- 1965 — Texas Federation of Music Clubs Competition, Second Prize for "Tomorrow Texas"

Ellis became a member of ASCAP in 1966.

- ASCAP Award for contributions in serious music; 1967, 1970, 1971, 1972, 1973, 1974, 1975, 1976, 1977, 1978, 1979

== Other publications ==
- Electronic Music Composition Manual, Merrill Ellis, Robert Cannon Ehle (born 1939), and Robert A. Moog, North Texas State University (196-?); OCLC 24103657 [latest date in bibliography is 1967]

== Merrill Ellis Memorial Composition Scholarship recipients ==
- 1990–92 — Kurt Kuniyasu
- 1990–91 — Gregory Alan Schneider
- 1991–92 — Rick D. Chatham
- 1991–92 — Michael Anthony McBride
- 1994–95 — Steven Bryant
- 1994–95 — Hideko Kawamoto
- 1994–96 — Man-Mei Wu
- 1996–97 — Lucio Edilberto Cuellar, DMA 2002
- 1998–99 — J.T. Rinker
- 1999–00 — Henry Vega
- 2000–01 — Kayli House
- 2002–03 — James Worlton
- 2005–07 — Stephen Lucas
- 2007–08 — Camilo Salazar
- 2009–10 — Nicholas Kanozik
- 2011–12 — Ryan Pivovar
- 2012–13 — Jonathan Jackson
- 2013–15 — Dan Tramte

== Selected discography ==
- Louisville Orchestra – Jorge Mester, conductor

Merrill Ellis, "Kaleidoscope," for Orchestra, Synthesizer, and Soprano – Joan Wall, soprano
George Crumb, Echos of Time and the River †

originally released 1974 (LP), Louisville Orchestra First Edition Recordings LS711; OCLC 916602, 9846970, 221630245, OCLC 83589462, 221612389, 79876387

- Unconventional Trumpet, music by University of North Texas (CD), composers Ellis, Beasley, McTee, Mailman, Austin, Latham, and Tull

Crystal Records (2004); OCLC 57490708

- Facets 2, John Holt, Trumpet

Natalia Bolshakova (piano)
Crystal Records CD764 (Dec 1, 2004); OCLC 57491034
Track 10 – Ellis: Trumpet Piece

† Crumb, who shares the album with Ellis, won the 1968 Pulitzer Prize in Music for this composition
