= Jan Bach =

American composer (1937–2020)

Jan Bach (December 11, 1937 – October 30, 2020) was an American composer. He taught at the University of Tampa (Florida) from 1965 to 1966 and at Northern Illinois University in DeKalb, Illinois (music theory and composition) from 1966 to 2002. His primary performing instrument was the horn, and he was renowned among hornists for his horn pieces. He also played the piano.

Bach died on October 30, 2020, at age 82.

== Early life and education ==
Jan Bach was born on December 11, 1937, in Forrest, Illinois. He earned a Bachelor of Music degree in 1959 from the University of Illinois at Urbana-Champaign and a Doctor of Musical Arts degree in composition there in 1971. He studied with Aaron Copland and Roberto Gerhard at Tanglewood in 1961 and with Thea Musgrave in Aldeburgh and London in 1974.

== Awards ==
In 1957 he won the BMI Student Composers first prize. He later won the Koussevitsky competition at Tanglewood, the Harvey Gaul Composition Contest, the Mannes College opera competition, the Sigma Alpha Iota choral composition award, first prize at the First International Brass Congress in Montreux, Switzerland, grants from the National Endowment for the Arts and the Illinois Arts Council, the Brown University choral composition award, first prize in the Nebraska Sinfonia chamber orchestra competition, and first prize in the New York City Opera competition. He has been nominated six times for the Pulitzer Prize in music.

In 1982, he was awarded a Presidential Research Professorship grant. He was Northern Illinois University's nominee for the National CASE Professor of the Year award six times.

== Compositional style ==
According to James P. Cassaro writing in the New Grove Dictionary of Music, "a predominant aspect of [Bach's] work is his charming and inexhaustible sense of humour." Cassaro goes on to remark that "in all genres, Bach's works display both structural clarity and a subtle use of instrumental timbre." Rick Anderson in the Quarterly Journal of the Music Library Association (June 2007), p. 925-926, calls Bach "one of America's somewhat hidden treasures" noting the "two sides, equally important, of Bach's musical personality...his seriousness...and his humor". Barry Kilpatrick in the American Record Guide (January–February 2007), p. 55-56 remarks that "[Bach] writes difficult music, to be sure. I think it's a prime motivation, judging by his own comments about how both the Horn Concerto and the French Suite might be the most difficult works ever written for horn. Perhaps this motivation comes from the fact that he is a horn player. Whatever the reason, the result is that only the highest level of player can seem in command of the pieces. Everyone else can only try hard."

== Compositions ==
His second opera, The Student from Salamanca, was produced by Beverly Sills for the New York City Opera Company in 1980. His first opera, The System, premiered in New York at the Mannes College of Music on March 5, 1974.

His orchestral compositions include: Burgundy Variations, 1968; Sprint, 1982; Alla Breve, 1984; Escapade, 1984; Romeo and Juliet, 1984; and Estampie, 1988.

His band and wind ensemble compositions include: Dionysia, 1964; Recitative and March, viola soloist and wind ensemble, 1966;The Eve of St. Agnes, 1976; and Foliations, 1995.

His chamber music includes Divertimento, oboe and bassoon, 1956; String Trio, 1956; Quartet for Stings, 1957; Quintet for Oboe and Strings, 1958, Four Two-Bit Contraptions, flute and horn, 1964, Skizzen, wind quintet, 1967, Laudes, brass quintet, 1971, Concert Variations, double-belled euphonium or euphonium and piano, 1977, and Triple Play for brass trio, commissioned by the Zephyr Brass Trio in 2006.

== Publishers ==
His publishers include Boosey & Hawkes, Carl Fischer, Associated Music, Meadow Music, Galaxy-Highgate, M. M. Cole, Mentor Music, Cimarron Music Press, Trevco Music, and ITEA Press.

== Bibliography ==
- The Grove Dictionary of Music and Musicians (2000), "Jan Bach".
- Baker's Biographical Dictionary of Musicians (1991), "Jan Bach".
- R.H. Kornick: Recent American Opera: a Production Guide (New York, 1991), 36–9.
- Time Magazine, October 20, 1980, Vol. 116, No. 16, 86-8: "Opera is Still Alive in New York".
- Newsweek, November 3, 1980, Volume XCVI, No. 18, 81: "Opera with the Sills Touch".
- Alfred Blatter, Instrumentation and Orchestration (New York, 1997), 156.
- The New York Times, October 26, 1980, "MUSIC VIEW; The 'Prickly Thickets' Of American Opera".
- K.E. Shrum: An Analytical Commentary on the Euphonium and Tuba Music of Jan Bach (diss., Arizona State U., 1989)
- R. Winston Morris and Daniel Perantoni: Guide to the Tuba Repertoire: The New Tuba Source Book (2006), 5, 135, 153, 175, 192.

== Discography ==
- The Happy Prince; Limited Classics LCI-101(LP)
- The New York Brass Quintet; Crystal Records S210 (LP)
- The New York Brass Quintet; Crystal Records (LP on CD, CD221)
- Introducing the Bowie Brass Quintet, BBQ 101 (CD, DDD)
- The Meridian Arts Ensemble; Channel Classics Records CCS 2191 (CD, DDD)
- Heavy Metal; Grammofon AB BIS
- Premieres; University of Wisconsin Recordings UW103 (LP)
- Clockworks; Grammofon AB BIS CD-699 (CD, DDD)
- Is This the Way to Carnegie Hall; Crystal Records S350 (LP)
- 20th Century Wind Chamber Music; Centaur Recordings CRC 2225 (CD, DDD)
- American Wind Music; Centaur Recordings CRC 2085 (CD, DDD)
- Opening Concert, 1979 Aldeburgh Festival; BBC In Recital #546 (TAPE)
- Chamber Music for Harp, Flute, and Strings; MChP-2 (CD, DDD)
- In the Shadow of a Miracle; Sierra Records SXCD 5005 (CD, DDD)
- Garten Von Freuden und Traurigkeit; Cavalli Records CD 237 (CD, DDD)
- Eu-Fish; Albany Records TROY 162 (CD, DDD)
- Obsessions; Nippon Acoustic Records NAR 2004 (CD, DDD)
- Premier!; Summit Records DCD 187 (CD, DDD)
- Contrasts for Trumpets; Doyen Recordings DOY CD 009 (CD, DDD)
- Jubilee; WSSNJ-9701 (CD, DDD)
- Spring!Flowers!; AFS Digital Media Services, RED ROSE RECORDS (CD, DDD)
- Paul Freeman Introduces Exotic Concertos; Albany Records TROY 521 (CD, DDD)
- My Very First Solo; Arktos Recordings, ARKTOS 200367 (CD, DDD)
- Something New; London Independent Records (LIR 015)
- Something Blue; LIR Classics (LIR 028)
- Oompa Suite; Summit Records (Classical), DCD 558 (CD)
- Zodiac; Koch Entertainment LP (KIC-CD-7538)
- Everyone But Me; Murch Records (MURCH2607)
- Foliations; Bis Records AB (BIS-CD-1438)
- Brass Outings; Gaudete Brass (GBQ-01)
- Blowout!; American Music Corporation (AMC 1018)
- Music from Five Centuries; Affetto Recordings (AF 2001)
- Themes and Meditations; Summit Records (DCD 700)
- American Music for Violin and Horn; Affetto Recordings (AF 2007)
- With Strings Attached; Central Michigan University (WPM 239)
- Le Soleil de Mitia; Indesens Records (INDE 005)
