= Frederick Kinsley =

American organist

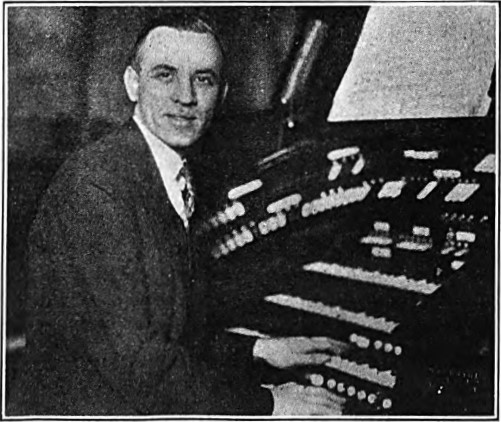
- Portrait of organist Frederick Kinsley, circa 1927
- Born: 4 May 1886
- Died: 30 May 1960 (aged 74)
- Occupations: Organist/theatre organist, teacher and recording artist
- Parent(s): Frederick Kinsley Sr. and Leonie Ambuhl

Frederick Kinsley (1886–1960) was a theatre organist and early recording artist for Edison Records in the 1920s. He was one of the first organists to be recorded on acoustical record following the advent of the technology.

== Early life ==
Frederick Kinsley was born on May 4, 1886, in New Haven, Connecticut. Kinsley was born into a musical family. His mother, Leonie Ambuhl Kinsley, was a descendant of German composer Franz Abt. She instructed him in piano by age 6. By age 12, he was known throughout New England as a keyboard prodigy.

== Education ==
Kinsley attended the Eaton School in New Haven as a young man, and Hillhouse for high school. He attended the Yale School of Music in 1904, majoring in organ performance. He was instructed by noted professor of organ at Yale, Harry Benjamin Jepson. Throughout his studies at the Yale music school, he worked as a vaudeville pianist, including at the former Poli's theatre of New Haven. He graduated in the class of 1907. He was engaged to be organist at the All Saint's Episcopal Church of New Haven in 1908. Subsequently, he studied abroad at Trinity College of Music and King's College of London. He was an awardee of a licentiate from Trinity College of London of the music school. He also studied with Widor in France.

== Organist ==
Upon his return to the United States, Kinsley was appointed choirmaster and organist of St. Paul's Church in New Haven. He held this position until World War I, during which time he served in the 26th division of the 102nd Infantry. During his service, he participated in the YMCA's "Overseas Entertainment" for troops, in the vaudeville division. Following military service in France, Kinsley had discovered his replacement at St. Paul's in New Haven. He then left to New York City, where he began many positions as house organist of theatres, beginning with one of the Fox theatres there. For a brief time in 1920, he was giving organ recitals in churches around Manhattan, including at the Church of the Incarnation. He was appointed chief organist at The Hippodrome in 1921. At this theatre, he played silent film accompaniments with orchestra, and during intermissions.

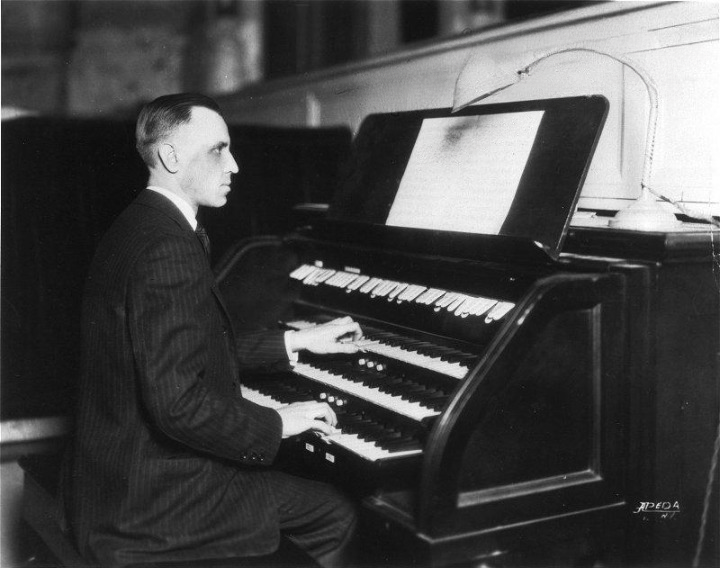
Frederick Kinsley at the console of the Midmer-Losh organ of The Hippodrome, 1924

He performed on a Midmer-Losh pipe organ, with which he would later make records for Edison. In 1924, he debuted Isham Jones' popular song, "I'll See You In My Dreams" at the Midmer-Losh of The Hippodrome. Kinsley also played the organs at the former Rialto, Strand and Cameo theatres.

Briefly in 1927, he was invited to play at the Picadilly Theatre (also known as Warners' Theatre) on Broadway, which had a large Marr & Colton organ. He returned to The Hippodrome that same year, which had installed a Wurlitzer organ a year prior. During this time, he instructed theatre organists including Eddie Baker. Kinsley also played a Welte-Mignon organ at a local radio station during this period. Kinsley became chief organist of RKO in June, 1928.

== Recording artist ==
Kinsley made his first recordings for Edison Records on June 15, 1924. This included an arrangement of Rachmaninoff's Prelude in C sharp minor, Liebestraum by Liszt, and the popular songs "The World Is Waiting for the Sunrise" by Ernest Seitz and "Poor Butterfly" by Raymond Hubbell, which debuted as part of "The Big Show" production at The Hippodrome in 1916. They were all recorded on the Hippodrome's Midmer-Losh. Further recording sessions were held elsewhere by Edison Records in 1925 with Kinsley presiding at two different Midmer-Losh organs in the manufacturer's factory. These were profitable records, as evidenced by a letter from Edison recording manager A. L. Walsh to Thomas Edison on June 29, 1926: SUBJECT: We need Organ Records[:]

"I am receiving a tremendous number of requests for Organ Records of popular selections to be sold at $1.00. This demand has been so persistent and widespread that I am firmly convinced that I could do nothing more important to our record business than to issue such records, particularly as Victor is making a big hit with such records at 75 cents."

This resulted in the acquisition of a Midmer-Losh organ for the Edison recording studio in West Orange, New Jersey in November 1926, which Kinsley would make regular recordings on going forward. These became very popular records by the late 1920s. Kinsley was promoted by Edison Records during this time as "organist of New York's famous "big" theatre, the "Hippodrome".

Kinsley continued to record for Edison after the company switched to electrical recordings during the summer of 1927. Of the nine titles recorded by that method, four were issued, the last being recorded on March 20, 1928. Test pressings exist of both issued and a number of un-issued sides, such as a version of "Are You Lonesome Tonight,?" recorded on December 24, 1927, survive at the Thomas Edison National Historic Park.

== Demise of theatre organ and later career ==
With the advent of sound technology in theaters such as Vitaphone, Frederick Kinsley abandoned silent film accompaniment and returned to becoming a church organist in Pelham Manor, New York. He also taught music at the Flushing and Bayside public high schools.

During the New York World's Fair of 1939, he was the featured organist at the Florida Building. His performances on its organ were also broadcast.

He was organist at Riverside Church in New York City from 1940 to 1946, preceding Virgil Fox. He was last the organist of Wesley Methodist Church in Worcester, Massachusetts from late 1946 until his retirement in 1960. He died that same year. Kinsley was the first dean of the Worcester Chapter of the American Guild of Organists in 1949.
