= Jeanne Singer =

American pianist and composer (1924–2000)

Jeanne Vandervoort Walsh Singer
- Born: August 4, 1924
- Died: June 20, 2000 (aged 75)
- Citizenship: American
- Education: Barnard College (B.A.); Columbia University
- Occupations: Pianist, teacher, composer

Jeanne Vandervoort Walsh Singer (August 4, 1924 – June 20, 2000) was an American pianist, teacher, and composer of lyrical poetry.

== Personal life and awards ==
Singer received a Bachelor of Arts from Barnard College, was taught composition by Douglas Moore at Columbia University, and was the student of pianist Nadia Reisenberg for 15 years. She also studied with Seth Bingham and William Mitchell. Her appearances included radio and television. She has composed over 150 songs. Singer won two First Rating Gold Medals from the National Guild of Piano Teachers, 12 First Prizes from the National League of Pen Women, and 20 ASCAP Awards.
