= Ruth Barrett Phelps =

American organist in NYC (1899–1980)

- Born: Anna Ruth Barrett; October 21, 1899; Albany, New York
- Died: August 20, 1980 (aged 80); San Mateo, California
- Occupation: Organist
- Spouses: Walter M. Arno and Lawrence I. Phelps

Ruth Barrett Phelps (October 21, 1899 - August 30, 1980) was an American organist whose career included both theatre organ and church performance.

== Biography ==
Ruth was born on October 21, 1899, in Albany, New York. She studied under a number of well-known teachers including Lilian Carpenter, Lynnwood Farnam, Ernest Mitchell, Fritz Heitmann, and Frank La Forge, and she attended Guilmant Organ School in New York City and American School of Music in Fontainebleau, France.

In 1926 she was a resident organist at the Colony Theatre in New York City. She moved to the Cameo Theatre in 1928. While in New York she performed concerts of classical music at Aeolian Hall. It was unusual for women to be organists at the time.

She married Lawrence I. Phelps, an organ builder, and from this point on performed as Ruth Barrett Phelps. She became the principal organist at The First Church of Christ, Scientist by 1950, the Aeolian-Skinner organ installed during her tenure was designed by her husband. As a result, she became one of Boston's prominent musicians, and made recordings and national radio broadcasts from the church. She was the first woman dean of the Massachusetts chapter of the American Guild of Organists. In addition to the church work she gave concerts of classical music. She wrote a monthly review column in The Christian Science Monitor, and published a number of music books. Among these books were several compilations of Mary Baker Eddy hymns and other music "suitable for Christian Science services".

Ruth Barrett Phelps died on August 30, 1980, in San Mateo, California.
