= Gladys Rich =

American composer

Gladys Rich (26 April 1892 - 18 October 1972) was an American composer and music educator who is best known for her song “American Lullaby.”

Rich was born in Philadelphia, Pennsylvania, to Ann Walker Low and Ezra Clark Rich. Her family moved to Ogden, Utah, where she was baptized in the Church of Jesus Christ of Latter-day Saints in 1901. She earned a B.A. at the University of Utah and a M.A. at New York University. She also studied at National Park Seminary in Washington, D.C., the New England Conservatory of Music, and with Edward Shippen Barnes, Harvey Gaul, and Frederick Schleider.

Rich entertained troops in Paris during World War I. From 1928 to 1933, she was a public school music supervisor in Newcastle, Pennsylvania. From 1933 to 1938, she was a music director at State Teachers College in Clarion, Pennsylvania. She belonged to the American Society of Composers, Authors, and Publishers (ASCAP), Kappa Kappa Gamma, and Mu Phi Epsilon.

Rich composed operettas and other vocal works, but is best known for her song “American Lullaby,” which was recorded in 1950 by Thelma Carpenter with the Ames Brothers and Orchestra (Varsity Records). Her compositions were published by Belwin Mills, G. Schirmer Inc., Galaxy Music Corporation, Carl Fischer Music, J. Fischer & Brothers, and Pioneer Music Press, and included:

== Works ==
=== Cantatas ===
- Beneath a Southern Sky (text by Vivian Yeiser Laramore)
- Journey of Promise
- Messengers of Mercy (text by Minnie D. Warner)
- Triumph of Faith (text by Claire Stewart Boyer)

=== Operettas ===
- Aloha Sugar Mill
- Garden Magic
- Renting the Hive
- The Lady Says Yes (libretto by Phyllis McGinley)
- The Toy Shop (libretto by Phyllis McGinley)
- Walk the Plank (libretto by Phyllis McGinley)

=== Vocal works ===
- American Lullaby
- Banana Man
- Christmas Wish
- Maholo Nui
- Nursery Rhyme Blues
- Octavos
- Partners
- Sitting Home
- Street of Little Houses
