= Mary Wiggins =

American classical composer

Mary Wiggins (February 10, 1904 – April 17, 1974) was an American composer, educator, organist, and pianist, born in Indiana, Pennsylvania.

== Biography ==
Wiggins studied composition at Carnegie-Mellon University with Roland Leich, and privately with Gladys W. Fisher and Harvey B. Gaul.

Wiggins taught organ at Schenley High School in Pittsburgh, Pennsylvania, from 1951 to 1957. She taught piano privately and at the Pittsburgh Musical Institute from 1959 to 1962, and received an award from the National Federation of Music Clubs in 1973. Her music was published by G. Schirmer Inc.

Wiggins died in 1974 in Pittsburgh.

== Works ==
Chamber

- pieces for bassoon
- pieces for organ
- pieces for violin

Piano

- Catch Me!
- Cathedral Bells
- Frolicking Waves

Vocal

- The Ghost
