= Edward Shippen Barnes =

American organist

- Born: September 14, 1887; Seabright, New Jersey
- Died: February 14, 1958 (aged 70); Idyllwild, California
- Education: Yale University
- Occupation: American organist.

Edward Shippen Barnes (September 14, 1887 in Sea Bright, New Jersey – February 14, 1958, in Idyllwild, California) was an American organist.

== Life and career ==
He was a graduate of Yale University, where he studied with Horatio Parker and Harry Jepson. After graduating from Yale, Barnes continued his studies in Paris with Louis Vierne, Vincent D'Indy, and Abel Decaux.

He worked as organist at the Church of the Incarnation, New York (1911–1912), Rutgers Presbyterian Church, New York (1913–1924), St. Stephen's Episcopal Church, Philadelphia (1924–1938), and the First Presbyterian Church, Santa Monica (1938–1958). He also composed two organ symphonies, other smaller organ works, arranged works for the organ and wrote books about religious music.

He also wrote an instructional organ method, The School Of Organ Playing (1921), and was editor of the magazine "American Organ Monthly." His students included composer Gladys Rich.

== Discography ==
- The Organ Symphonies of Edward Shippen Barnes, performed by Simon Nieminski; 1937 Wicks organ, St Mary's RC Cathedral, Peoria, Illinois, USA: Pro Organo, January 2001. Pro Organo CD 7131

== Compositions ==
- Hush, my dear, lie still and slumber; Christmas carol-anthem & cappella. New York, C. Fischer, inc., 1933. 1 p.l., 5 p. 27 cm.

== Dedications ==
- Louis Vierne dedicated his organ work Cathédrales from his Pièces de Fantaisie pour orgue, Suite IV, Op. 55 (1927) "à mon élève" Edward Shippen Barnes.
- T. Tertius Noble dedicated his 2 Pieces for Organ (1913) to Edward Shippen Barnes
