= Harry Benjamin Jepson =

American organist and composer

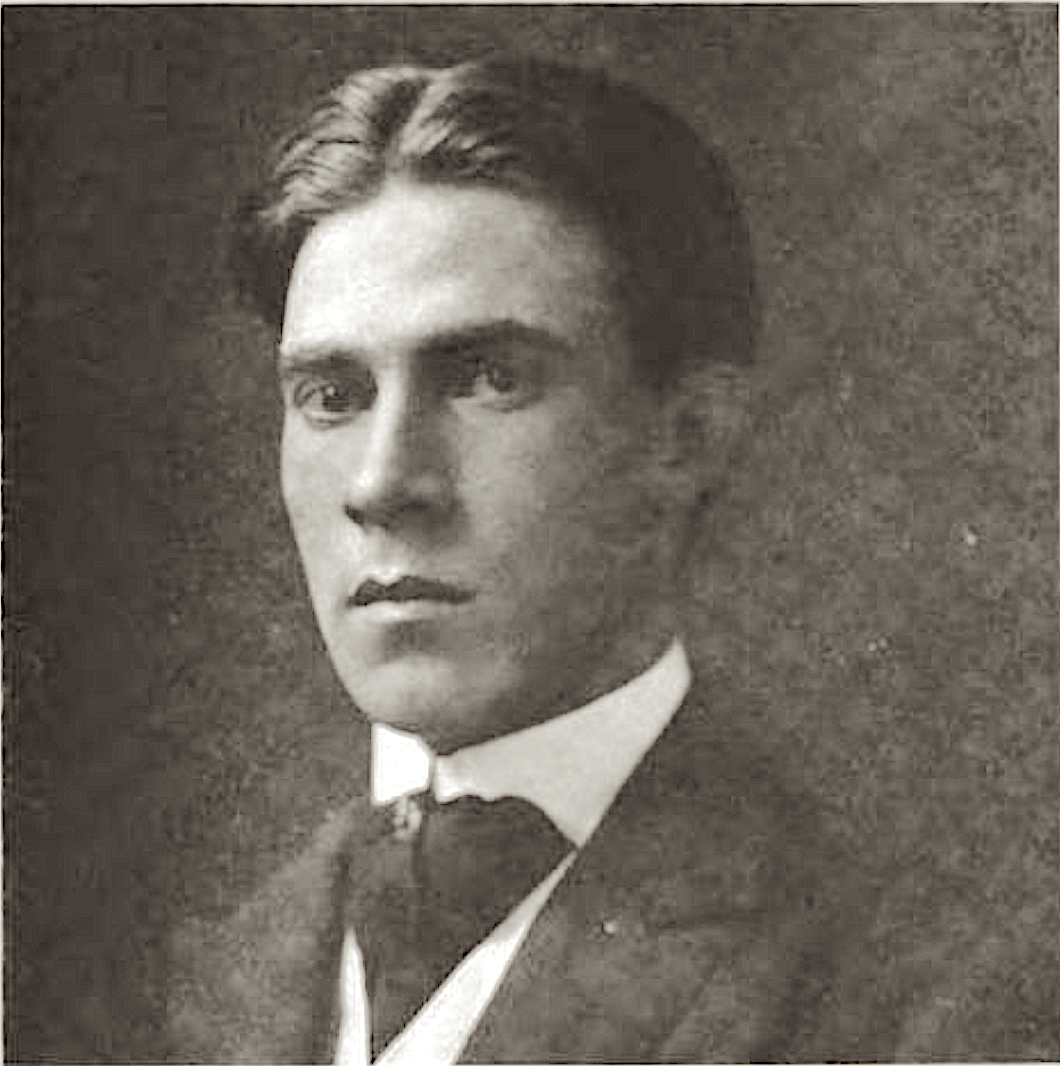
- Jepson in an 1908 publication
- Born: August 16, 1870; New Haven, Connecticut
- Died: August 23, 1952 (aged 82); Noank, Connecticut
- Education: Yale University, B.A. (1893), B.M. (1894)
- Occupations: Organist and composer
- Spouse: Isabella James

Harry Benjamin Jepson (August 16, 1870 – August 23, 1952) was an American organist and composer and (starting in 1906) the first University Organist of Yale University.

Jepson was born August 16, 1870, in New Haven, Connecticut. He attended Hillhouse High School. Jepson studied at Yale under Horatio Parker and Gustave Stoeckel, earning a B.A. in 1893 and a B.M. in 1894. While at Yale he was the organist for New Haven's Christ Church (in 1889) and Old Center Church (from 1890 to 1894 where he was succeeded by Charles Ives). He then studied in Paris under Charles Marie Widor and Louis Vierne.

He was appointed instructor at Yale in 1895, eventually rising to a full professorship in 1907. He also directed the Battell Chapel choir. He retired in 1939; Charles Kullman was among the performers at the musical service in held for his retirement.

Among his students were Edward Shippen Barnes (who dedicated his 2nd Organ Symphony to Jepson), Seth Bingham (who dedicated his Counter-Theme from 6 Pieces Op. 9 to Jepson, and who Jepson hired briefly at Yale), Edwin Arthur Kraft, Virginia Carrington-Thomas, and Frederick Kinsley.

Jepson died August 23, 1952, in Noank, Connecticut. He was succeeded by Luther Noss as University Organist.

Yale's Harry B. Jepson Memorial Scholarship is named after him, and he oversaw the design and construction of the renowned Newberry Memorial Organ in Yale's Woolsey Hall, as well as its 1915-1917 and 1929 renovations.

== Selected compositions ==
- Ballade for organ (c. 1907), dedicated to Florence Annette Wells, New Haven area organist and 1900 Yale graduate.
- Veni, Sancte Spiritus, anthem for chorus and organ.
- Masquerade, for organ, dedicated to Lynnwood Farnam
- Pastel, for organ, dedicated to Miles Farrow, organist of Cathedral of St. John the Divine in New York City.
- Toccata, dedicated to Hugo Goodwin
- Pantomime, dedicated to Pauline Voorhees
- L'Heure exquise, dedicated to Ruth Muzzy, likely a former student
- Sonata in G-Minor, for organ, dedicated to Arthur Hyde, organist of St. Bartholomew's Church in New York City.
- Battell Chapel, hymn, text by William Gaskell.
