= Clifford Taylor (composer) =

American classical composer

Clifford O. Taylor (20 October 1923 in Avalon, Pennsylvania – 19 September 1987 in Abington Township, Montgomery County, Pennsylvania) was an American composer and music educator. He studied with Walter Piston and Paul Hindemith and served as chairman of the department of music composition at Temple University for 23 years. Among his compositions are three symphonies, The Freak Show (a 1975 one-act opera), several string quartets and numerous piano sonatas. In December 1971 the Philadelphia Orchestra played the world premiere of his Symphony No. 2. He was married for many years to Louise Kemp, living with her in Jenkintown, PA until his death at Abington Memorial Hospital in 1987. They had three sons, Christopher, Andrew and Jonathan Taylor.

His major works seemed to belonged to a school of thought among 20th century American composers, such as Aaron Copland and Leonard Bernstein, that was intent on writing music exhibiting strictly American styles, properties, and innovations.

In fact, the sound of Clifford Taylor's music might indeed be mistaken for some by Copland, and it seems to have used similar compositional processes.
