= Leslie Adams (composer) =

American composer (1932–2024)

Harrison Leslie Adams Jr.
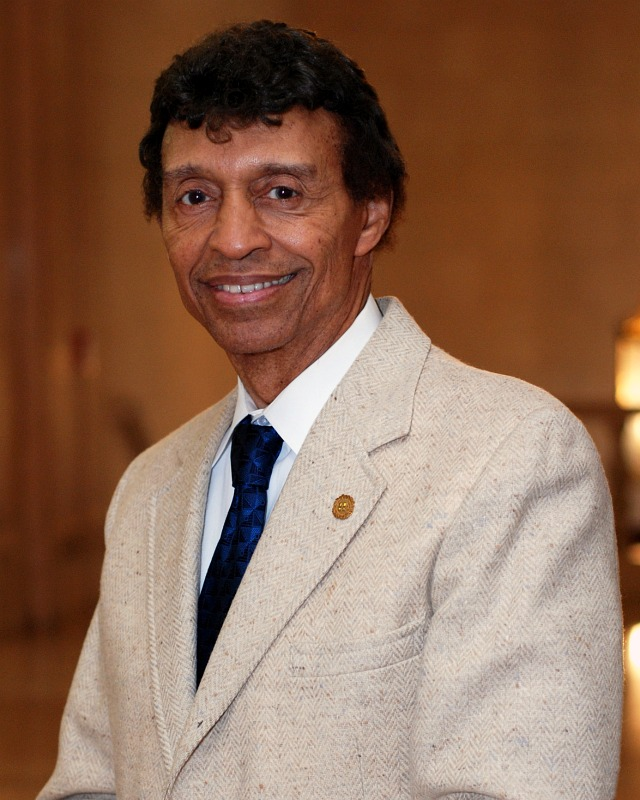
- H. Leslie Adams
- Born: December 30, 1932; Cleveland, Ohio, USA
- Died: May 24, 2024 (aged 91); Cleveland, Ohio, USA
- Education: Oberlin College (BM), California State University, Long Beach (MM), Ohio State University (PhD)
- Occupation: Composer
- Known for: Music for voice, choral music, art songs, vocal solos, music drama
- Works: Blake (1986), Twenty-Six Etudes for Solo Piano (1997–2007)
- Awards: National Association of Negro Women Composition Award; Christian Arts National Competition for Choral Music; Cleveland Arts Award (2015)

Harrison Leslie Adams Jr. (December 30, 1932 – May 24, 2024) was an American composer. His works have been performed by the Prague Radio Symphony Orchestra, Iceland Symphony Orchestra, Buffalo Philharmonic Orchestra, and Indianapolis Symphony Orchestra, and commissioned by the Cleveland Orchestra, Ohio Chamber Orchestra, Cleveland Chamber Symphony, and the Center for Black Music Research, among others. Metropolitan Opera artists have performed his vocal works internationally. He has also received composition awards from the National Association of Negro Women and the Christian Arts National Competition for Choral Music. Adams is best known for writing music for voice (including choral music, art songs, vocal solos, and music drama) but has also written numerous purely instrumental compositions. Adams's music is composed largely within the tradition of Western classical music and also incorporates elements unique to African-American music.

== Biography ==
Born in Cleveland, Ohio, on December 30, 1932, Adams began to study music at an early age, having lessons with neighbor and violinist Dorothy Smith at four years old. Adams earned a Bachelor of Music Education from Oberlin College in 1955, a Master of Music from California State University, Long Beach in 1967, and a Ph.D. in Music from Ohio State University in 1973. He also pursued private studies with Leon Dallin, Herbert Elwell, Joseph R. Wood, Vittorio Giannini, Robert Starer and Eugene O'Brien. He received composer residency fellowships from the Rockefeller Foundation (Bellagio, Italy, 1979) and Yaddo Artist Residence (Saratoga Springs, New York, 1980 and 1984). Adams has held high school appointments and faculty positions at Stillman College, Florida A&M University and the University of Kansas.

Adams's music drama Blake (composed 1986) was the focus of a significant portion of Y. C. Williams's New Perspectives on Music (ed. J. Wright with S.A. Floyd Jr, published Warren, Michigan, 1992, pages 172–209). This music drama is very loosely based on Martin Delany's novel Blake; or the Huts of America (1859–1862), which is about the lives of African-American slaves on the eve of the Civil War. The work incorporates many elements of African-American music, such as syncopated rhythms, melodies reminiscent of spiritual and gospel music, and an improvised percussion passage in the style of Afro-Cuban jazz. Adams started to compose Blake in June 1980 after taking up residence at the Yaddo arts colony. During this stage, he worked with librettist Daniel Myers, which carried the development of the opera into 1985. The opera was introduced at Oberlin College at a workshop setting and officially had its first hearing at the Bolden Theatre, Cleveland Playhouse. The premiere was broadcast over PBS with Veronica Tyler and Kathleen Orr (sopranos), Jane Vernon (mezzo-soprano), Paul Atkins (tenor), Herbert Perry (baritone), Stephen Saxon (bass), and the William Appling singers with Appling conducting.

Between 1997 and 2007, Adams composed Twenty-Six Etudes for Solo Piano, which were recorded by Maria Thompson Corley (1–12) and Thomas Otten (13–26) and performed live at the University of North Carolina at Chapel Hill. In 2015, he received the Cleveland Arts Award.

Adams worked from his Cleveland studio in Ohio purely focused on composition and promotion of his music. He was also a frequent lecturer at various colleges and universities, instructing people on his music.

Adams died in Cleveland on May 24, 2024, at the age of 91.

== Compositions ==
=== Daybirth ===
A collection of songs on the texts of Joette McDonald:

- "On This Day"
- "Love Union (a.k.a. Christ at a Wedding)"
- "In the Midnight of My Soul"
- "Cantus"
- "Anniversary Song"
- "Daybirth"
- "Flying"
- "From a Hotel Room"
- "Love Request"
- "Lullaby Eternal"
- "Midas, Poor Midas"
- "Song to Baby Jesus"
- "Song of Thanks"
- "Song of the Innkeeper's Children"
- "Wave and the Shore"
- "Contentment"
- "Night People"

=== Five Millay Songs ===
Songs on the texts of Edna St. Vincent Millay:

- "Wild Swans"
- "Branch by Branch"
- "For You There is No Song"
- "The Return from Town"
- "Gone Again is Summer the Lovely"

=== Nightsongs ===
- "Prayer" (text by Langston Hughes)
- "Drums of Tragedy" (text by Langston Hughes)
- "The Heart of a Woman" (text by Georgia Douglas Johnson)
- "Night Song" (text by Clarissa Scott Delany)
- "Sence You Went Away" (text by James Weldon Johnson)
- "Creole Girl" (text by Morgan Collins)

Note: Nightsongs is also available for medium solo voice and chamber orchestra. "The Heart of a Woman" is also available for solo tenor, solo baritone and piano.

=== The Wider View ===
- "To the Road" (text by Paul Laurence Dunbar)
- "Homesick Blues" (text by Langston Hughes)
- "Li'l' Gal" / "My Man" (text by Paul Laurence Dunbar)
- "Love Come and Love gone" (text by Georgia Douglas Johnson)
- "The Wider View" (text by R. H. Grenville)
- "Love Rejoices" (text by James Dillet Freeman)

=== Collected songs ===
- "Love Request" (text by Paul Laurence Dunbar)
- "Love Memory" (text by Paul Laurence Dunbar)
- "Amazing Grace" (text by H. Leslie Adams)
- "Song of Solitude" a/k/a "Alone...." (text by Nikos Valance)
- "Dream Song" (text by Countee Cullen) piano–vocal and optional with cello obbligato
- "Advocation" (text by Suzanne Hassler)
- "Christmas Lullaby" (text by H. Leslie Adams)
- "It's So Nice Being Home at Christmas" (text by H. Leslie Adams)
- "Walking After Midnight" (text by H. Leslie Adams)

== Scores and recordings ==
Critically acclaimed CD recordings of Adams are Twelve Etudes (Piano Etudes Part I), Piano Etudes Part II.
