= Edwin Arthur Kraft =

American organist & choir-director (1883-1962)

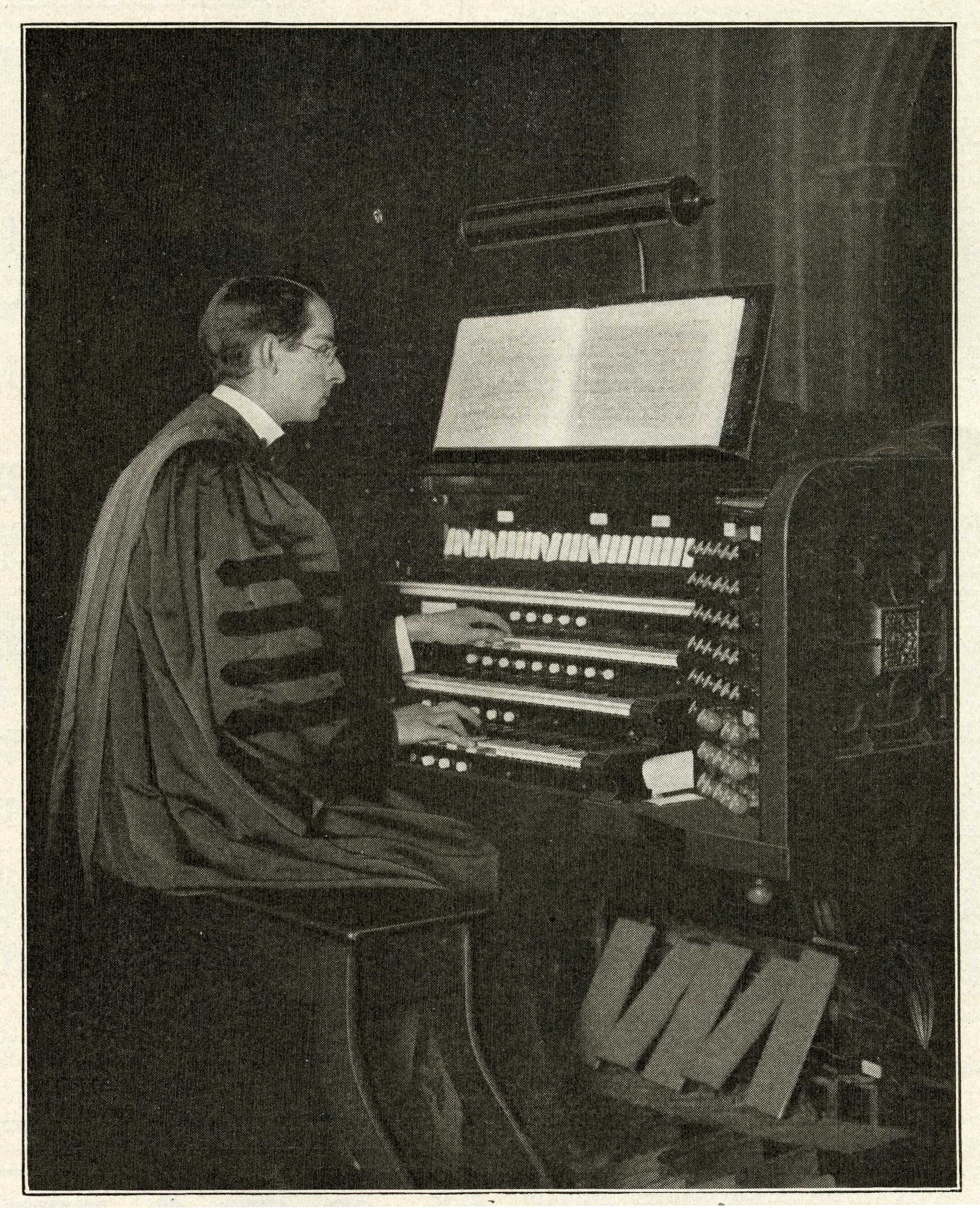
Kraft at the console of the Skinner organ at Trinity Cathedral, Cleveland.

Edwin Arthur Kraft (January 8, 1883 - July 15, 1962) was an American organist and choir-director.

== Biography ==
Kraft was born in New Haven, Connecticut, on January 8, 1883. At age 15 he became organist at New Haven's Grace Methodist Church, and soon after became organist and choirmaster at the Church of the Ascension. He studied music at Yale University under Horatio Parker and Harry Jepson before becoming became the organist at St. Thomas's Church in Brooklyn, N.Y. He then went to Europe for three years, studying organ with Grunicke and Edgar Stillman Kelley in Berlin and Alexandre Guilmant and Charles-Marie Widor in Paris. Upon returning to the US he took the position as organist of St. Matthew's Church in Wheeling, West Virginia. In 1907 he was chosen from among 90 applicants as the organist of Trinity Cathedral, Cleveland, and gave the dedicatory performance of its new Skinner Organ Co. pipe organ. In 1914 he moved to Atlanta to work as municipal organist but he returned to Trinity Cathedral the following year. Kraft also served as director of music at Lake Erie College and as head of the organ department at the Cleveland Institute of Music. He finally retired from his position at the cathedral in 1959. He died on July 15, 1962, and was buried in the Mausoleum of Knollwood Cemetery.

He married Nancy Lovis in December 1909 and had three children, Nanette, Margaret, and Edwin Arthur, Jr. The year after his wife's death in 1925 Kraft married his second wife, mezzo-soprano Marie Simmelink. He was a fellow of the American Guild of Organists.
