= Old First Presbyterian Church (Newark, Delaware) =

Historic church in Delaware, United States

- U.S. National Register of Historic Places
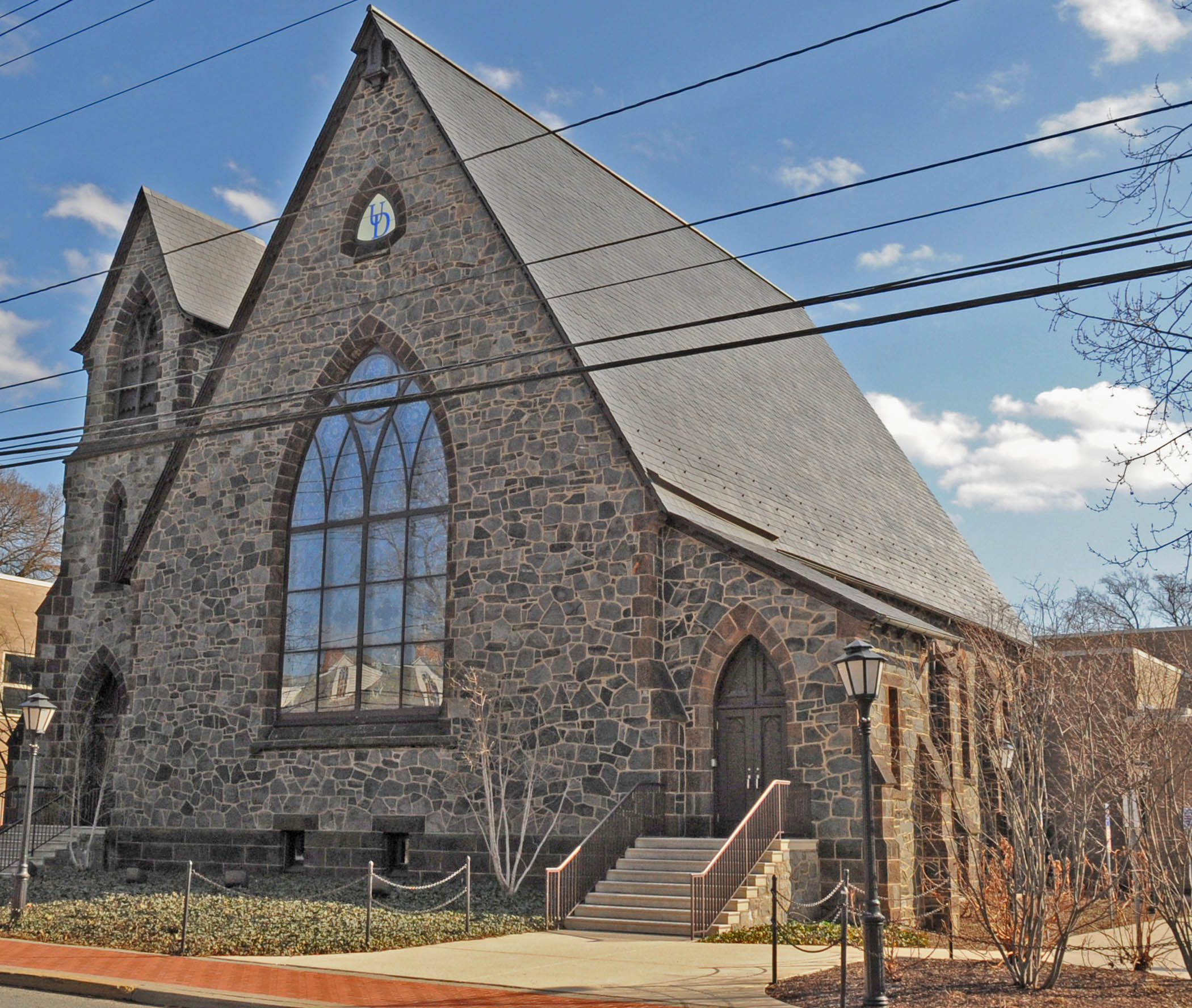
- Old First Presbyterian Church, February 2016

- Location within Delaware Location within the United States
- Location: 17 W. Main St., Newark, Delaware
- Coordinates: 39.682751°N 75.754594°W
- Area: 0.4 acres (0.16 ha)
- Built: 1872
- Architect: Dixon & Davis
- Architectural style: Gothic
- MPS: Newark MRA
- NRHP reference No.: 82002347
- Added to NRHP: May 7, 1982

Old First Presbyterian Church is a historic Presbyterian church located at Newark in New Castle County, Delaware. It was begun in 1868, dedicated in 1872, and is one story rectangular stone structure with a two bay facade and a tower. The tower features a steep gable roof with flared eaves and a louvered belfry. Architects Dixon and Davis of Baltimore designed this stone building in the Gothic Revival style. The Wilmington Daily Commercial publicized its construction, describing blue granite and brownstone mined from Chestnut Hill, a steeple soaring 100 feet high and twenty-foot interior ceilings. A large, pointed-arch, stained-glass window dominates the north wall facing Main Street. Narrow, pointed-arch windows with pastel, diamond-shaped panes line the east and west walls between exterior stone buttresses. The slate roof has alternating rows of square and scalloped shingles. In 1967, the building was sold by the First Presbyterian Church to the University of Delaware. The University of Delaware renamed it after J. Fenton Daugherty, professor of physics from 1929 to 1945 and dean of men from 1945 to 1951. Several generations of students knew it as "The Abbey," a cafeteria-style dining facility. In 1995, as part of the new student center project, the University restored the sanctuary and reopened it as a "quiet" study lounge adjoining Trabant University Center.

Daugherty Hall has been listed on the National Register of Historic Places since 1982. It has been incorporated into the University's Trabant University Center.

It was added to the National Register of Historic Places in 1982.

== See also ==
- National Register of Historic Places listings in Newark, Delaware
