= Seth Bingham =

American organist and composer (1882–1972)

Seth Daniels Bingham (April 16, 1882 – June 21, 1972) was an American organist and prolific composer.

== Biography ==
Bingham was born in Bloomfield, New Jersey, the youngest of four siblings in a farming family that soon relocated to Naugatuck, Connecticut. After extensive childhood activities in church music, he studied organ and composition with Harry Benjamin Jepson and Horatio Parker at Yale University, gaining a B.A. in 1904. Taking time also to study in Paris with Alexandre Guilmant, Vincent d'Indy and Charles-Marie Widor, Bingham earned his B.Mus. from Yale in 1908, and subsequently taught theory, composition and organ at Yale from 1908 to 1919. Beginning in 1913, he was organist and choirmaster at Madison Avenue Presbyterian Church in New York City, a position he held until his 1951 retirement. He was an associate professor at Columbia University from 1922 to 1954, received an honorary doctorate from Ohio Wesleyan University in 1952, and lectured at the School of Sacred Music at Union Theological Seminary from 1953 to 1965. His students included Jeanne Walsh Singer. He married Blanche Guy in Switzerland in 1907, had two children and three grandchildren, and died in New York City at age 90.

== Compositions ==
Bingham's compositions include orchestral, choral, and chamber music, but most of his compositions are for organ solo. His best-known works are:

- Roulade, from "Six Pieces for Organ", Op. 9, No. 3 (1923), dedicated to David McKinley Williams
- Suite for Organ "Baroques", Op. 41 (1944), dedicated to E. Power Biggs
  - 1. Overture
  - 2. Rondo Ostinato
  - 3. Sarabande
  - 4. Rhythmic Trumpet
  - 5. Voluntary
