= Clarissa Ocampo =

Filipino-American mezzo-soprano

Clarissa Ocampo is a Filipino-American mezzo-soprano. She is best known for her album Cradle Songs and sings professionally in the United States and Asia.

== Early life ==
Clarissa Ocampo was born in the Philippines. Her mother was a concert pianist and her father was an obstetrician. She graduated from high school in 1986, and planned to attend college in the United States until the People Power Revolution against the Marcos regime took place.

Initially she enrolled as a pre-med student at a local university but decided to transfer to the University of Santo Tomas Conservatory of Music. It was here she realized her calling to music. "I was able to build a singing career in the Philippines while in college, and I think this was when I knew that singing was going to be my profession," she said.

A short time later, Ocampo was accepted into Juilliard for graduate school. It was then that she began her career in the United States.

== Career highlights ==
- WINNER "Best Female Classical Performer", Aliw Awards 2013.
- "Kalayaan: Pananagutan ng Bayan Para Sa Tuwid Na Daan" in celebration of the 114th Philippine Independence Day.
- As Berta in Rossini's "The Barber of Seville" at the Cultural Center of the Philippines.
- Guest Artist "Ramon Obusan Folkloric Group's 40th Anniversary "Ugat, Ugnayan... Obusan".
- Alto Soloist in "Beethoven's Fantasy in C minor for Piano, Chorus, and Orchestra, Op. 80" with the Singapore Symphony Orchestra.
- As Lady Thiang in the First National Touring Company of “The King & I”, Dodger Productions, New York USA; AEA Member.
- Gian Carlo Menotti’s “Amahl and the Night Visitors”, Aiken Productions, IN, USA.
- "Beyond Expectations", as Guest Artist of Mr. Jed Madela at the Cultural Center of the Philippines.
- “Pepe Rizal, Sa Isip, Sa Salita at Sa Gawa”, premiered a new composition by Jesse Lucas, poem by Jose Rizal.
- A repeat performance of G.F. Handel’s “Messiah”, at the Tremont Temple Baptist Church, Boston, MA.
- G.F. Handel’s “Messiah”, at the Tremont Temple Baptist Church, Boston, MA.
- “Ang Pag-Ibig Mo”, an all-Filipino concert at the Nichols Concert Hall, Music Institute of Chicago, Evanston, IL.
- “Chanted Journeys”, a concert sponsored by the Filipinas Heritage Foundation, held at the Cultural Center of the Philippines.
- “Sari-Saring Musika”, with the country’s premier vocal group The CompanY.
- As Edad in the staged reading of Juan Cabreros Laya’s play “Sa Sariling Lupa”, at the Carlos P. Romulo Auditorium, RCBC Building.
- “Love Unspoken”, University of Santo Tomas Conservatory of Music’s Quadricentennial Celebration, at the Cultural Center of the Philippines.
- “GENESIS”, Gala concert to close the Cultural Center of the Philippines’ 40th Anniversary celebration.
- “Seven Arts One Imelda”, premiered Mr. Ryan Cayabyab’s commissioned work “Muse and Madness”.
- “RUBIES”, 40th Anniversary Concert of the Cultural Center of the Philippines, where she sang Vincent A. De Jesus’ “Walang Himala” to rave reviews.
- “Mga Ginintuang Alaala ni Conching Sunico at ng MET”, a Filipino Heritage Festival 2009 season performance.
- Virtuosos 2008: Voices Through Time at the Cultural Center of the Philippines
- Featured Artist in the Cultural Center of the Philippines’ Filipino Artist Series.
- Alto soloist in Sir Michael Tippett’s “A Child of Our Time”, with the Philippine Philharmonic Orchestra.

=== Opera roles performed ===
- Berta in Rossini's Il Barbiere di Siviglia, The Cultural Center of the Philippines (2012)
- Judith in Bartok’s Bluebeard’s Castle with the MCO Foundation (2009)
- Flora Bervoix in Verdi’s La Traviata with The Singapore Lyric Opera (2008)
- Olga in the Philippine premier of Tchaikovsky’s Eugene Onegin (2006)
- Cherubino in the concert version of The Marriage of Figaro with the UST Symphony Orchestra (2004)
- Pitti-Sing in “The Mikado” with Opera North (1995)
- Rosina in “The Barber of Seville” (1995)
- Romeo in “I Capuletti ed I Montecchi” (1993)
- Third Spirit in “The Magic Flute” with the Juilliard Opera Theater. (1992)

=== Discography ===
- “Cradle Songs”, IJH Productions 2004, Boston, MA USA. Cradle Songs won “Best Lullaby Album”, and “Best Classical Album” at the 2004 Children’s Music Awards, chosen by over 70 schools in the US.

=== Fellowships and award grants ===
- University of California Santa Barbara – Vocal Institute Fellowship Grant, where she performed in a number of song recitals, and a master class conducted by Mignon Dunn.
- Aspen Music Festival Chamber Music Fellowship Grant in Colorado, where she performed in a variety of concerts, including “The Brilliance of Brahms”, with renowned soprano Renée Fleming as the featured artist.
- Anna Case McKay Scholarship Grant from the Juilliard School
- University of Santo Thomas Scholarship Grant
- Young Artist Foundation Scholarship Award
- Prizewinner of the New York Vocal Artists Competition held at Carnegie Hall, New York
- Two-time prize winner of the National Music Competition for Young Artists in the Philippines

== Artist-in-residence ==
From May 2012 - March 2013, Clarissa accepted a 10-month position as Artist-in-Residence with The Philippine Opera Company in Manila, where she mentored Young Artists of The Philippine Opera Company through private studio lessons, master classes and workshops. She also assisted the Artistic Director with development, planning, and coordination of the monthly Young Artist Series, which ran from October through March. She performed regularly as Guest Artist in the company's Young Artist Series, Main Stage productions, special performances, and high-profile events as contracted by producers and music directors affiliated with the opera company.

== Current achievements ==
In September 2015, Clarissa obtained a Master of Arts degree in Communication Disorders, Speech-Language Pathology. Clarissa is now a licensed and ASHA certified Speech-Language Pathologist and Voice Specialist, mentoring elite performers, coaching singers and actors with articulatory precision, and teaching them mastery of good vocal hygiene, as well as, the use of proper vocal techniques for optimum performance. Over the years, Clarissa has conducted numerous lectures, workshops, and masterclasses in singing and voice performance techniques for Opera and Theater singers, TV and radio actors, and other individuals who use their voice for their profession (i.e. radio announcers, lecturers, teachers, etc.).

Clarissa's ultimate goals are to integrate her knowledge in music and vocal performance with her clinical Speech practice, as she continues honing her clinical skills and expertise through advanced learning, as well as, participate in evidence-based and empirical research to further enhance the knowledge and skills in the treatment of Voice and Swallowing disorders for the adult neurological population, and the treatment of voice disorders found in professional voice users.
