= Greater Cleveland Associated Foundation =

- Founded: November 8, 1961
- Founder: Harold Clark, Dolph Norton, Kent Smith, Paul Ylvisaker
- Dissolved: 1971
- Location: Cleveland, Ohio, U.S.
- Region served: Cuyahoga County, Ohio, U.S.
- Method: Grants, Funding

The Greater Cleveland Associated Foundation (GCAF, or the Associated Foundation) was a community foundation established in 1961 in Cleveland, Ohio, in the United States to assist other private and community foundations in and around Cleveland in establishing priorities and working to find solutions to pressing social needs. After its second round of funding, GCAF leaders merged the foundation with The Cleveland Foundation, an organization which GCAF had greatly influenced.

== Creating GCAF ==
=== Idea for a new foundation ===
The Cleveland Foundation was far and away Cleveland's largest community foundation in the 1960s. But many individuals felt that the organization had become staid and fusty. Among these were Kent Smith a chemical engineer and retired president of the Cleveland Graphite Oil Products Company (later renamed Lubrizol Corporation), and Harold Clark, a local Cleveland attorney who was executor of the estate of Leonard C. Hanna, Jr. (a partner and director of Hanna Mining). Clark had also spent most of the 1940s and 1950s on The Cleveland Foundation's Distribution Committee, which approved grants to local organizations. By 1960, Smith had become a member of the Distribution Committee.

Both men believed that The Cleveland Foundation's grantmaking was too routinized and not responsive to the changing needs of people in the area. They also believed the foundation had lost sight of its original goal: Producing cutting-edge research designed to spark progressive social change.

Political scientist Paul N. Ylvisaker was head of the Public Affairs Program at the Ford Foundation. The program was committed to studying the problems of urban areas and financing pilot project to help solve them. In late 1960, Ylvisaker was in the process of finalizing a $1.25 million grant to the Kansas City Association of Trusts and Foundations (later renamed the Kansas City Community Foundation) to help that body revitalize its research and grant-making agenda. About the same time, Ylvisaker began talking to Harold Clark about how the Public Affairs Program might make a similarly sized grant to a Cleveland-area organization. Homer Wadsworth, head of the Kansas City foundation, urged Ylvisaker to make the grant, so that it would not appear as if the Ford Foundation were favoring Kansas City.

To lead the new foundation, Ylvisaker recommended Dr. James Adolphus "Dolph" Norton, his college roommate at Harvard University and by 1961 a political scientist at Case Institute of Technology. In February 1961, Ylvisaker contacted T. Keith Glennan, president of Case, to ask him to temporarily release Norton from his teaching duties so he could lead the new foundation. Glennan agreed. Glennan and Ylvisaker also decided to have Kent Smith work with Norton on developing the proposal further.

=== Norton's proposals ===
On July 17, 1961, Norton met with The Cleveland Foundation's Distribution Committee to discuss his proposal for a new foundation. Clark convinced Thomas Patton, president of Republic Steel and chairman of the Cleveland Development Foundation, and Elmer Lindseth, president of the Cleveland Electric Illuminating Co. and a director of the Cleveland Development Foundation, to accompany Norton to underscore the importance the business community gave to his plans. The Distribution Committee agreed to give Norton $5,000 from The Cleveland Foundation's Leonard C. Hanna, Jr. Special Purpose Fund to allow him to write the proposal. By August 1, Norton had a draft proposal finished which proposed establishing a new program under The Cleveland Foundation. He had also won preliminary agreement from Clark that a major grant would be made to the new foundation by the Hanna estate. Norton and Lindseth both urged Kent Smith to become chairman of the board of the new organization.

On August 25, 1961, Norton presented a revised proposal to the Distribution Committee. His plan now conceived of a foundation separate and distinct from The Cleveland Foundation. Concluding that The Cleveland Foundation did not have the vision or funding mechanisms for carrying out the more activist program envisioned for the new foundation, Norton proposed establishing a separate entity. In order to avoid the appearance that the Hanna estate had control over the new foundation, Norton argued that the Hanna donation should be a matching grant. This required seeking the majority of the new foundation's funding from an outside source, like the Ford Foundation. The Ford Foundation's name would also provide the new organization with a great deal of cachet, which would be needed to win the support of the business community.

On November 8, 1961, the Distribution Committee, the Hanna estate, the Elizabeth Severance Prentiss Foundation, the Louis D. Beaumont Foundation, the Kulas Foundation, and the Elizabeth Ring Mather and William Gwynn Mather Fund jointly submitted the proposal for the new community fund to the Ford Foundation. Letters of recommendation also came from Anthony J. Celebrezze, Mayor of Cleveland; Michael DiSalle, Governor of Ohio; the Cleveland Chamber of Commerce; and Dr. Glennan, in his capacity as president of Case Institute of Technology. The new foundation was to be called the Greater Cleveland Association of Foundations.

On December 8, 1961, the Ford Foundation informally notified the Distribution Committee that it was giving the new foundation $1.25 million. Edgar A. Hahn, treasurer of the Louis D. Beaumont Foundation, subsequently urged a changed in the name of the new foundation to avoid the appearance that it wanted to become the sole source of charitable giving in Cuyahoga County. He suggested using the word "associated, and on December 12 the Distribution Committee notified the Ford Foundation that the new foundation would thenceforth be known as the Greater Cleveland Associated Foundation.

== Operational history ==
On November 16, 1961, Harold Clark, Kent Smith, Elmer Lindseth, and Ellwood Fisher (president of Fisher Foods) organized themselves as the first Board of Trustees of the Greater Cleveland Associated Foundation. Smith was elected chairman of the board, and Dolph Norton was appointed president. An 11-member Board of Directors was appointed by the Trustees, which included the four trustees, the president, three prominent local businessmen, and representatives from four of the sponsoring foundations. Seth Taft, a prominent local attorney and general counsel for The Cleveland Foundation, drew up the articles of incorporation. With the name change on December 12, the new foundation was established.

On December 15, 1961, the Ford Foundation formally notified GCAF that it had won its $1.25 million grant. The Ford Foundation grant went entirely to grantmaking, because operating expenses were paid for by a $1.25 million grant from the Leonard C. Hanna, Jr. Special Purpose Fund.

=== Initial grantmaking ===
GCAF made just $300,000 in grants to just seven organizations in its first year. About $200,000 went to the Welfare Federation of Cleveland, a coalition of groups which dominated anti-poverty efforts in Cleveland in the fields of income support, job training, education, and similar areas. Two grants—one for $7,000 to the Greater Cleveland Youth Services Planning Commission and one for $18,000 to a coalition of citizens' groups in education—augured the direction GCAF would take in the next nine years.

Grantmaking in GCAF's first year was not well-planned, as the board and President Norton struggled to find a common vision. In December 1961, Norton threatened to resign when the Board of Directors declined to give him a pay raise, a sign that the board had found extensive fault with his leadership of GCAF. A compromise was reached, in which the pay raise was granted and Norton given one year to prove his leadership of the organization.

=== Influential early grants ===
In 1962, GCAF and The Cleveland Foundation provided a grant to help Cuyahoga County plan the creation of Cuyahoga Community College. GCAF also helped lobby local training schools and private colleges, which had opposed the community college on the grounds that it would be competitive with them. The college opened in 1963. Smith, originally an opponent of the effort, became its biggest booster. He aggressively and successfully solicited funds for the college from area businesses, successfully breaking a century-long Cleveland taboo on private donations to public endeavors.

In September 1963, GCAF created and funded a "program advisory committee", the Plan for Action by Citizens in Education (PACE)—one of many such committees the foundation sponsored to provide it with citizen and activist input on critical issues, including recommending and implementing solutions. PACE grew out of the $18,000 educational system study grant made in 1962, and GCAF funded the program advisory committee's work for three years with a $110,000 operating grant. GCAF also provided funding in the fall of 1963 to Community Action for Youth (CAY). (Note: In 1958, The Cleveland Foundation urged the Welfare Federation of Cleveland to look into the rapidly rising level of crime among poor youth. The Welfare Federation created the Greater Cleveland Youth Services Commission. CAY was operated by the Greater Cleveland Youth Services Commission.) GCAF's $7,000 grant to CAY permitted the organization, whose funding was running out, to search for new financing. In June 1963, CAY won a major $1 million grant to combat juvenile deliquency from the President's Committee on Juvenile Delinquency and Youth Crime. GCAF made a $100,000 matching grant to CAY to allow CAY to win the federal monies. By the end of 1963, the GCAF board had fulsome praise for Norton's leadership.

During 1963, GCAF developed a grant decision-making process that later would become standard among community foundations. First, GCAF sought to build consensus around what the problem was and what the solutions should be. Second, grants focuses on coordinating efforts among existing groups, rather than a go-it-alone strategy. Third, the grants were often matching grants, or were used by the recipient organization to attract other resources. Fourth, the grants were used to attract existing high-quality talent to the recipient organization, or to develop such talent.

In 1966, GCAF, The Cleveland Foundation, and the Carnegie Foundation jointly provided $400,000 to Case Institute of Technology and Western Reserve University to study whether the two colleges should merge. They did so in 1967, forming Case Western Reserve University. On November 3, 1966, GCAF and The Cleveland Foundation gave $180,000 to Operation Equality (a project to assist African American families in finding affordable housing outside slum areas) and $167,500 to the Fair Housing Council (an organization fighting housing discrimination). By 1973, the Fair Housing Council convinced 45 out of the county's 60 municipalities to pass fair housing resolutions, and Operation Equality had filed lawsuits and won fair housing consent agreements with landlords owning more than 10,000 units.

During the first five years of its Ford Foundation grant, GCAF disbursed more than $1.8 million in 52 separate grants, which included $160,000 to the Cuyahoga County Mayors and City Managers Association; $233,438 to Western Reserve University to establish a graduate program in public management science; $157,000 to the Welfare Federation of Cleveland; $45,000 to the Lake Erie Watershed Conservation Foundation; $100,000 Community Action for Youth; $50,000 to Cuyahoga Community College; $11,000 to the Governmental Research Institute; $24,000 to PACE; and $15,000 to Cleveland elementary school libraries.

=== Second grant-making round and merger ===
In 1966, the Ford Foundation made a second $1.25 million grant to GCAF to support its grant-making abilities. The Hanna estate also made another $1.25 million for operational support. The Ford Foundation, however, indicated it was unlikely to make a second renewal of its grant and challenged GCAF to consider where its funding would come from in the future.

Norton and Smith believed that, although GCAF had not yet made much of an impact on The Cleveland Foundation's grant-making decisions, GCAF should merge with the larger, wealthier, more established foundation. In 1963, John Sherwin, Sr. succeeded Lindseth as chairman of The Cleveland Foundation. The following year, Sherwin wrote a memo to the files expressing his concern that The Cleveland Foundation's Distribution Committee was not adequately evaluating grant proposals before approving them, and that the foundation's staff was not properly trained or numerous enough to do its work. On January 10, 1965, GCAF director Dolph Norton wrote a confidential memo to Sherwin suggesting that GCAF and The Cleveland Foundation merge. He also suggested that the merged organization's board be specifically diversified to include at least one woman, one African American, and one young person. With Cleveland Foundation chairman J. Kimball Johnson nearing retirement age, Norton suggested that either Sherwin himself, Kent Smith, or Carter Kissell (vice chairman of the board of directors of steelmaker Midland-Ross and then-chairman of the Businessmen's Interracial Committee on Community Affairs). The merged organization should have three divisions, Norton said: A Community Development division (overseeing research and grantmaking in the areas of civic governance, education, health, race relations, and welfare), a Physical Development division (overseeing research and grant-making in the areas of economic development, housing, transportation, and urban planning), and a Foundation Development division (overseeing foundation finances and staff development). He also suggested that, for the first time, the foundation hire a professional staff of seven.

Negotiations between the two organizations did not take on a more serious nature until after the Hough riots, a race riot which occurred in Cleveland in late July 1966. In the wake of the riots, Sherwin attempted to reinvigorate The Cleveland Foundation by asking T. Keith Glennan to leave Case Institute of Technology and become the new chairman of the organization. Glennan declined, and Sherwin began negotiating more intensively with Norton. On August 23, Norton asked Seth Taft (now GCAF's attorney) to draft an expanded version of the January 1965 proposal. This met with general approval from Sherwin, and he asked The Cleveland Foundation's counsel, the law firm of Thompson, Hine and Flory, to draft a resolution approving the proposal. The draft proposal was ready by December 12. After slight reworking by Taft, Sherwin and Smith approved it at a meeting on December 30. At this meeting, Norton later said, "the Associated Foundation...persuaded The Cleveland Foundation that its structure was outdated".

On April 14, 1967, The Cleveland Foundation's Distribution Committee and the Trustees Committee voted to approve the merger. GCAF's board approved it a few days later. The resolution essentially created two interlocking boards of directors, whose memberships were exactly the same. Although each foundation would, until April 1, 1971, (Note: This is the date GCAF's funding ran out.) retain its legal identity, name, and distinct funding sources, the two foundations would share staff and office space. Each board would meet quarterly and approve disbursements from each foundation's funds. Membership on The Cleveland Foundation's Distribution Committee was temporarily increased to 14 members from five, with the nine new members appointed by GCAF. Two of the Distribution Committee's members already sat on the GCAF board of directors; the remaining three would be immediately appointed to the GCAF board as well. The Distribution Committee would shrink to 11 members on the date of the merger.

On July 6, 1967, John Sherwin and Kent Smith announced that The Cleveland Foundation and GCAF would merge on April 1, 1971.

== Independence issues and closure ==
Legally, GCAF was separate from The Cleveland Foundation and had its own staff and 11-member board of trustees. In terms of financial control, however, GCAF was essentially a trust fund of The Cleveland Foundation. With the interlocking boards and Distribution Committee, GCAF now essentially controlled more than $5 million a year in grant-making, provided by The Cleveland Foundation. To accommodate the newly energized programmatic goals of The Cleveland Foundation, the Distribution Committee created five subcommittees (cultural affairs, education, health and welfare, public affairs, and youth) to evaluate proposals before sending them to the Distribution Committee and then the Cleveland Foundation board for approval.

In 1968, John Sherwin, Sr. was elected chairman of the Greater Cleveland Associated Foundation.

J. Kimball Johnson retired as director of The Cleveland Foundation on December 31, 1967, Norton was appointed director of The Cleveland Foundation—effectively unifying the chief executive officer position for both organizations.

=== Legacy ===
Historian Diana Tittle, who has best chronicled the history of The Cleveland Foundation and GCAF, assessed GCAF's legacy in this way:

In the years preceding the election of Carl B. Stokes as Cleveland's mayor in 1967, the Associated Foundation would spark or shape public debate on the need for improvements in the schools, race relations and city governance, thus helping to create a climate for reform. Acting on the new ideas generated, GCAF would help to make possible such sweeping changes as the creation of the first publicly supported community college in the state, the integration of Cleveland's near eastern suburbs and the total overhaul of the creaky management structure of City Hall.

== Citations ==
Notes

Citations

== Bibliography ==
- Bartimole, Roldo (1995). "Who Governs: The Corporate Hand". In Keating, W. Dennis; Krumholz, Norman; Perry, David C (eds.). Cleveland: A Metropolitan Reader. Kent, Ohio: Kent State University Press. ISBN 9780873384926.
- Bernard, Richard M. (1990). Snowbelt Cities: Metropolitan Politics in the Northeast and Midwest Since World War II. Bloomington, Ind.: Indiana University Press. ISBN 9780253311771.
- Hammack, David C. (1998). "Community Foundations: The Delicate Question of Purpose, 1989". Making the Nonprofit Sector in the United States: A Reader. Bloomington, Ind.: Indiana University Press. ISBN 9780253334893.
- Hodges, James A.; O'Donnell, James H.; Oliver, John W. III (2003). Cradles of Conscience: Ohio's Independent Colleges and Universities. Kent, Ohio: Kent State University Press. ISBN 9780873387637.
- Rothman, Jack (1999). Reflections On Community Organization: Enduring Themes and Critical Issues. Itasca, Ill.: F. E. Peacock. ISBN 9780875814162.
- Shiao, Jiannbin Lee (2005). Identifying Talent, Institutionalizing Diversity: Race and Philanthropy in Post-Civil Rights America. Durham, N.C.: Duke University Press. ISBN 9780822334361.
- Tittle, Diana (1992). Rebuilding Cleveland: The Cleveland Foundation and Its Evolving Urban Strategy. Columbus, Ohio: Ohio State University Press. ISBN 9780814205600.
