= Fisher Tull =

American classical composer

Fisher Aubrey Tull, Jr. (September 23, 1934 – August 23, 1994), known professionally as Fisher A. Tull, a.k.a. Mickey Tull, was an American composer, arranger, educator, administrator, and trumpeter.

== Life and career ==
Tull was born in Waco, Texas, where he attended public schools. He eventually earned three degrees from the University of North Texas: a B.M. in music education (1956), a M.M. in music theory (1957), and a Ph.D. in music composition (1965). He studied trumpet with John Haynie and composition with Samuel Adler. While an undergraduate, he played trumpet in and arranged for various jazz and dance bands, including the University of North Texas Lab Bands.

In 1957 Tull became a faculty member at Sam Houston State University in Huntsville, Texas, serving as Chairman of the Department of Music since 1965.

Tull entered into serious composition beginning in the early 1960s. His works are generally tonal but harmonically adventurous and rhythmically vigorous, and show a strong influence of Medieval and Renaissance music. His catalog of compositions include over 80 published works for orchestra, band, chorus, and chamber ensemble, although he is known particularly for his works for concert band, brass, and percussion ensemble. Most of his works are published by Boosey & Hawkes (with which he was on contract since 1974) and Southern Music Company, with other works available from Western International Music, Ludwig Publishing Company, TRN, and the International Trombone Association Manuscript Press.

Tull died in Huntsville, Texas. On July 13, 1996 the Fisher A. Tull Memorial Gazebo was dedicated in downtown Huntsville.

== Selected works ==
- Prelude and Double Fugue
- Studies in Motion
- Cryptic Essay
- The Final Covenant
- Jargon After William Billings
- Liturgical Symphony
- Swing Board
- March for Tripod
- Sketches on a Tudor Psalm
- Sonata for Trumpet and Piano
- Three Bagatelles
- Segments
- Concerto Grosso
- The Binding
- Sonatine for percussion ensemble (1971)
- Rhapsody for Trumpet and Winds (1980)
- Jargon (After William Billings) (1976)

== Discography ==
- Sam Houston State University Symphonic Band and Wind Ensemble, Ralph L. Mills, Conductor (1981). The Compositions of Fisher A. Tull, v. 2. LP. Golden Crest Records.
