= Nicolas Bucher =

French organist (born 1975)

Nicolas Bucher (born 30 November 1975) is a French organist and harpsichordist, accompanist, continuo player, and conductor who devotes most of his artistic life to organ music, 17th and 18th century vocal music, opera and contemporary music.

== Life ==
Born in Lens, Bucher began playing the organ in Arras and then at the Conservatoire de Lille, in Jean Boyer's and Aude Heurtematte's classes. He then continued his musical studies with Jean Ferrard, at the Royal Conservatory of Brussels where he obtained First Prizes in organ, writing and music history.

In 1997, he entered the Conservatoire national supérieur de musique et de danse de Lyon, where he met Jean Boyer again. He obtained his national diploma in musical higher education in June 2000.

Bucher was a finalist of the Xavier Darasse International Organ Competition of Toulouse (1998) and received second prize at the International Organ Competition Musashino-Tokyo (October 2000).

Working as an organist in Lens, Marcq-en-Barœul, and Lyon (Saint-Jean Cathedral), Bucher succeeded Michel Chapuis in 2002 at the prestigious tribune of Église Saint-Séverin in Paris, a position he held until April 2013. He is currently titular organist of the organ of the Vézelay Abbey.

After teaching organ in several music schools, he then turned his career towards conducting. As a holder of the certificate of aptitude for the functions of director of the conservatory, Bucher directed the conservatory of Arras from 2005 to 2007. From September 2007 to November 2011, he was Director of Music Studies at the Conservatoire de Lyon.

Since 2011, Bucher has lived and worked in Vézelay, where he directs the Cité de la Voix, a unique place dedicated to vocal art in the form of artistic residencies, a professional vocal ensemble (Arsys Bourgogne), and a public season. Since 2018, he has been in charge of the Centre de musique baroque de Versailles (CMBV).

From 2011 to 2018, Nicolas Bucher lived and worked in Vézelay, where he directed the Cité de la voix, a unique venue devoted to the vocal arts in the form of artistic residencies, a professional vocal ensemble (Arsys Bourgogne) and a public season. Since March 1, 2018, he has directed the Versailles baroque music center. He has held the position of titular organist at Saint-Gervais church in Paris since the end of 2021.

== See also ==
- Liesbeth Schlumberger, one of his teachers.
