= François Brassard =

Canadian musician

François Joseph Brassard (6 October 1908 in Métabetchouan – 26 April 1976 in Quebec City) was a Canadian ethnomusicologist, organist, composer and music teacher.

Brassard studied piano with Rolland-Georges Gingras, organ with Omer Létourneau and harmony with Robert Talbot. As a scholarship student of the Académie de musique du Québec he was a student of Léo-Pol Morin and Claude Champagne in Montreal in 1930. He finished his training in 1933–34 in Paris with Albert Bertelin and Guy de Lioncourt and in 1935 at London's Royal College of Music with Ralph Vaughan Williams.

Brassard was an organist from 1930 to 1970 at the Church of Saint-Dominique in Jonquière, (Quebec). Starting in 1940, he collected more than 1200 French-Canadian folksongs on journeys throughout Canada, and published a series of articles and essays. His arrangements were broadcast in two series on CBC Radio. He also taught at Université Laval beginning in 1946 and worked at the folklore archives there. One of his notable pupils was composer Micheline Coulombe Saint-Marcoux.

His composition Panis angelicus won a prize in 1942 from the Société des musiciens d'église de la province de Québec. The concert hall of the Cégep de Jonquière was named Salle François Brassard in his honour in 1965.
