= Lioncourt =

Lioncourt or de Lioncourt is a surname. Notable people with this name include:

== People ==
- Guy de Lioncourt (1885–1961), French composer
- Vincent Berthier de Lioncourt (born 1947), French musician

== Fictional characters ==
- Lestat de Lioncourt, character from Anne Rice's The Vampire Chronicles novel series
- Gabrielle de Lioncourt, character from the same series, Lestat's mother, see List of The Vampire Chronicles characters
