= Jean Boyer (organist) =

French organist (1948–2004)

- Born: 4 October 1948; Sidi Bel Abbès (French Algeria)
- Died: 28 June 2004 (aged 55); Lille
- Occupation: Organist

Jean Henri Marcel Boyer (4 October 1948 – 28 June 2004) was a French organist and a professor of organ at several institutions including the Conservatoire national supérieur musique et danse de Lyon.

== Career ==
Jean Boyer's father, Noël Boyer, a former student of André Marchal and Jean Langlais, was the organist of the Cathedral Saint Vincent and taught piano and violin at the Conservatory of Sidi Bel Abbès. Jean Boyer began his musical studies in Toulouse, where he trained with Xavier Darasse. He obtained a first organ prize in 1969 and recorded his first record in 1971 at the organ of Gimont in the Gers department.

In 1972, he became the organist of the Église Saint-Nicolas-des-Champs in Paris, taking over from Michel Chapuis. He remained in office until 1995. In 1975, he also joined Michel Chapuis, André Isoir and Francis Chapelet at the pulpit of the Église Saint-Séverin.

Jean Boyer was a professor at the Conservatoire of Bayonne, of Brest, at the Schola Cantorum de Paris, at the Conservatoire de Lille (1982-1992), where he succeeded Jeanne Joulain, and finally at the Conservatoire national supérieur musique et danse de Lyon, where he succeeded Xavier Darasse. He was also regular visiting teacher at the Conservatorium van Amsterdam.

Among his students were Élise Rollin, Yves Lafargue, Nicolas Bucher, Arnaud Pumir, Dong-ill Shin, Jean-Luc Perrot, Damien Simon, Aude Schumacher, Francis Jacob, Bruno Beaufils, Brice Montagnoux, Dominique Chevalier, Laurent Bouis, Sylvain Heili, Lionel Avot, Andrés Cea Galan, Willy Ippolito, Jérôme Mondesert, Aude Heurtematte, Michel Jézo, Régis Rousseau, Thomas Ahrén du Quercy, Su-One Park, Hye-Won Park, Ayako Kuwayama, Yukiko Jojima, Loreto Aramendi, Mickael Souveton, Krzysztof Pawlisz.

In 2004 a cancer broke out; Boyer died at the age of 55 following the effects of cerebral haemorrhage. He is buried at cimetière de l'Est in Lille.

Jean Boyer was a great "discoverer" of ancient instruments. His scant discography illustrates his mistrust of the fixed recording compared to the spontaneity of concerts.

== Distinctions ==
- 1972: Grand Prix du Disque of the Académie Charles Cros
- 1978: Laureate of the Arnhem-Nimègue (Netherlands) competition

== Discography ==
- Spanish, Flemish and French pieces on the organ of Gimont
- Pieces by Alexandre-Pierre-François Boëly at St Nicolas des Champs
- Integral of the organ work by Johannes Brahms
- Integral of the work by orgueby Nicolas de Grigny at Collégiale Saint-Sylvain of Levroux (1979)
- Organ pieces by Jehan Titelouze, Charles Racquet, Francisco Correa de Arauxo
- Leipzig chorals by Johann Sebastian Bach at Porrentruy
- Integral of the organ work by Louis-Nicolas Clérambault
- Mass by Maurice Ohana
- Concerti grossi op.3 by Georg Friedrich Haendel

== Bibliography ==
- 1995: La "Grand Pièce Symphonique" de César Franck. In: Hans Davidsson, Sverker Jullander: Proceedings of the Göteborg International Organ Academy 1994. Göteborgs universitet, Göteborg
- 1997: Johannes Brahms et l'orgue. In Japan Organist
- 1998: Nuances dynamiques dans la musique d'orgue de J. S. Bach. In 30 ans d'orgue. Évolution de la facture d'orgue, de l'interprétation et des répertoires ancien et contemporain au cours des 30 dernières années. Académie de l'orgue de Saint-Dié-des-Vosges, Saint-Dié, (pp. 155–156).

== See also ==
- Liesbeth Schlumberger, a pupil (in Lille), then assistant (in Lyon)
