= Jacques Berthier =

French composer

- Born: 27 June 1923; Auxerre, Burgundy, France
- Died: 27 June 1994 (aged 71); Paris, France
- Era: 20th century
- Known for: Taizé compositions
- Spouse: Germaine de Lioncourt
- Children: Vincent Berthier de Lioncourt
- Father: Paul Berthier

Jacques Berthier (27 June 1923 – 27 June 1994) was a French composer of liturgical music, best known for writing much of the music used at Taizé.

== Biography ==
Berthier was born in Auxerre, Burgundy; both of his parents were musicians. His father Paul was the kapellmeister and organist at the Auxerre Cathedral and his mother Geneviève Parquin was a composer. Learning first from his parents, Berthier was trained in music at the École César Franck in Paris. While there, he was taught by, among others, Edouard Souberbielle and Guy de Lioncourt (whose daughter he married).

In 1955 Berthier was first asked to compose music for the Taizé Community, which was then just a monastic community of twenty brothers. Six years later he became organist at the Church of the Jesuits in Paris, Saint-Ignace, where he worked until his death. In 1975, Berthier was again asked to compose for Taizé, this time for chants to be sung by the increasing numbers of young people coming to worship there. Over nearly twenty years, Berthier built up a body of church music that has been utilized around the world.

He died at his home in Paris in 1994, and requested that none of his own music be used in his funeral at Saint-Sulpice. In 2006, the Jubilate Deo Award was granted to him posthumously. It was accepted by Brother Jean-Marie (Taizé).

His son is Vincent Berthier de Lioncourt.

== Music ==
In more than twenty years, Berthier left an important corpus (232 songs in 20 different languages) in wide use today by other communities and around the world. He is also the author of Masses for organ, a cantata in the form of the cross and a cantata for Saint Cecilia. In total, he wrote over 1,500 pieces of work.

He collaborated with Didier Rimaud.

== Taizé songs ==
The 2024-2025 edition of the song booklet used by the Taizé Community contains songs written by Jacques Berthier, as well as Joseph Gelineau and the brothers of Taizé.

Berthier's Taizé songs include;

- 1 : Dans nos obscurités
- 2 : Wait for the Lord
- 3 : Bleibet hier
- 5 : Bless the Lord
- 7 : Notre âme attend
- 8 : C’est toi ma lampe
- 9 : Jésus le Christ
- 10 : Laudate Dominum
- 11 : Oculi nostri
- 12 : De noche
- 13 : Veni Creator (litanie)
- 14 : Tui amoris
- 15 : Ubi caritas
- 16 : Bénissez le Seigneur
- 17 : El Senyor
- 18 : Confitemini Domino
- 19 : Magnificat (canon)
- 20 : Adoramus te Christe
- 21 : Christe Salvator
- 22 : Veni Creator (canon)
- 23 : Laudate omnes gentes
- 24 : Singt dem Herrn
- 25 : Gloria... et in terra pax
- 26 : La ténèbre
- 29 : Ostende nobis
- 32 : Mon âme se repose
- 33 : Nunc dimittis
- 34 : Cantate Domino (canon)
- 35 : Bonum est confidere
- 36 : Spiritus Jesu Christi
- 37 : Jesus, remember me
- 38 : Psallite Deo
- 40 : Surrexit Christus
- 41 : Magnificat (choral)
- 43 : Veni Lumen (choral)
- 44 : Adoramus te O Christe
- 45 : Christus resurrexit
- 46 : In te confido
- 47 : Per crucem / Vater unser
- 48 : Crucem tuam
- 49 : Surrexit Dominus vere
- 50 : Nada te turbe
- 52 : Veni Sancte Spiritus
- 53 : Dona la pace Signore
- 54 : Toi, tu nous aimes
- 55 : Da pacem cordium
- 56 : Sanctum nomen Domini
- 57 : Vieni Spirito creatore
- 58 : Misericordias Domini
- 60 : O Christe Domine Jesu
- 61 : Jubilate Coeli
- 63 : Benedictus (canon)
- 65 : Dona nobis pacem
- 68 : Alleluia 4
- 69 : Alleluia 7
- 70 : Alleluia 8
- 71 : Alleluia 10
- 72 : Alleluia 11
- 79 : Kyrie eleison 1
- 80 : Kyrie eleison 5
- 81 : Kyrie eleison 6
- 82 : Kyrie eleison 8
- 83 : Kyrie eleison 9
- 84 : Kyrie eleison 10
- 85 : Kyrie eleison 12
- 86 : Kyrie eleison 13
- 91 : Veni Lumen cordium I
- 92 : Veni Lumen cordium II
- 117 : Nebojte se
- 141 : Bleib mit deiner Gnade
- 143 : Eat this bread / Jesus Christ, bread of life
