= Jean-Luc Perrot =

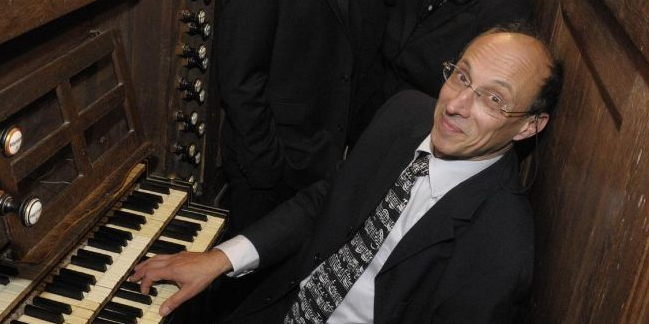
Jean-Luc Perrot at the Souvigny pipe organ

Jean-Luc Perrot (born 23 May 1959 in Moulins, Allier, in Central France) is a French organist, carillonneur, composer and musicologist.

== Biography ==
Jean-Luc Perrot is agrégé of musicology, Doctor of literature and arts (musicology), lecturer at the École Supérieure du Professorat et de l'Éducation (former IUFM) of Saint-Étienne after being a lecturer at the Jean Monnet University of this same town, where he previously taught organology, accompaniment and free value Arts Lyriques. A pupil of Roland Meillier in piano at the conservatoire à rayonnement régional de Saint-Étienne, he studied the pipe organ (an instrument he discovered at the age of 13 in 1972), under the leadership of Michel Chapuis, Jean Boyer, as part of Summer Academies. The holder of the historical organ Callinet (1837) of Notre-Dame in Saint-Étienne, his thesis on L'orgue en France de 1789 à 1860 led him to discover many forgotten sheet music. In January 2013, he was appointed to replace Henri Delorme on the François-Henri Clicquot organ in Souvigny, alongside Madeleine Cordez and Pierre Dubois. He is the author of several articles, analyzes, CD booklets, and historical notices. He also plays the harmonium, the harpsichord and the carillon.

His recordings L'Héritage de l'orgue classique, Suites et versets (on the organ of La Chaise-Dieu), Beauvarlet-Charpentier à Souvigny, Maîtres français du XVIIe à Pommiers en Forez (as harpsichordist), four-handed works on the large organ of the Cathedral of Rodez in the company of Georges Lartigau and recently a CD devoted to the unpublished works of Michel Corrette at La Chaise-Dieu showed his attachment to rare music scores. His last recording on the organ of Villerupt is devoted to a certain number of forgotten Romantic composers (Petrali, Smart, Brosig, La Tombelle, Becker). His concerts have taken him all over France but also in Italy, Poland, Germany, Spain and Canada. He has recently performed several improvisational experiments, notably in long sessions of accompanying silent films.

Alongside his teaching activities (he has deepened pedagogy at the University Institute of Teacher Training and gives many courses and master classes), he founded the Baroque ensemble La Clémence d'Urfé. Jean-Luc Perrot is also a composer: He has written several pages for organ alone and organ with 4 hands, works for choir, carillon, or various formations of chamber music. His first Suite à quatre mains pour l'orgue dans le style français, including in particular a third in size entitled Le tombeau de Georges Cziffra was published by La Sinfonie d'Orphée.

He also gives numerous lectures both in France and abroad, for associations, for the CNRS, or at international conferences (Brussels, Paris, Poland). As a musicologist, his articles were published in the Dictionnaire des musiciens du XIXe siècle, the encyclopedy Die Musik in Geschichte und Gegenwart, and in collaboration with the Observatoire musical français (Paris-Sorbonne University)

He collaborated in the publication of facsimile works in the series Patrimoine et Mémoire de l'orgue, at éditions Musicreprints (works by Benaut, Miné, Daussoigne-Méhul, Batiste). He is secretary of the Cavaillé-Coll Association.

Jean-Luc Perrot is chevalier in the Ordre des Palmes académiques.

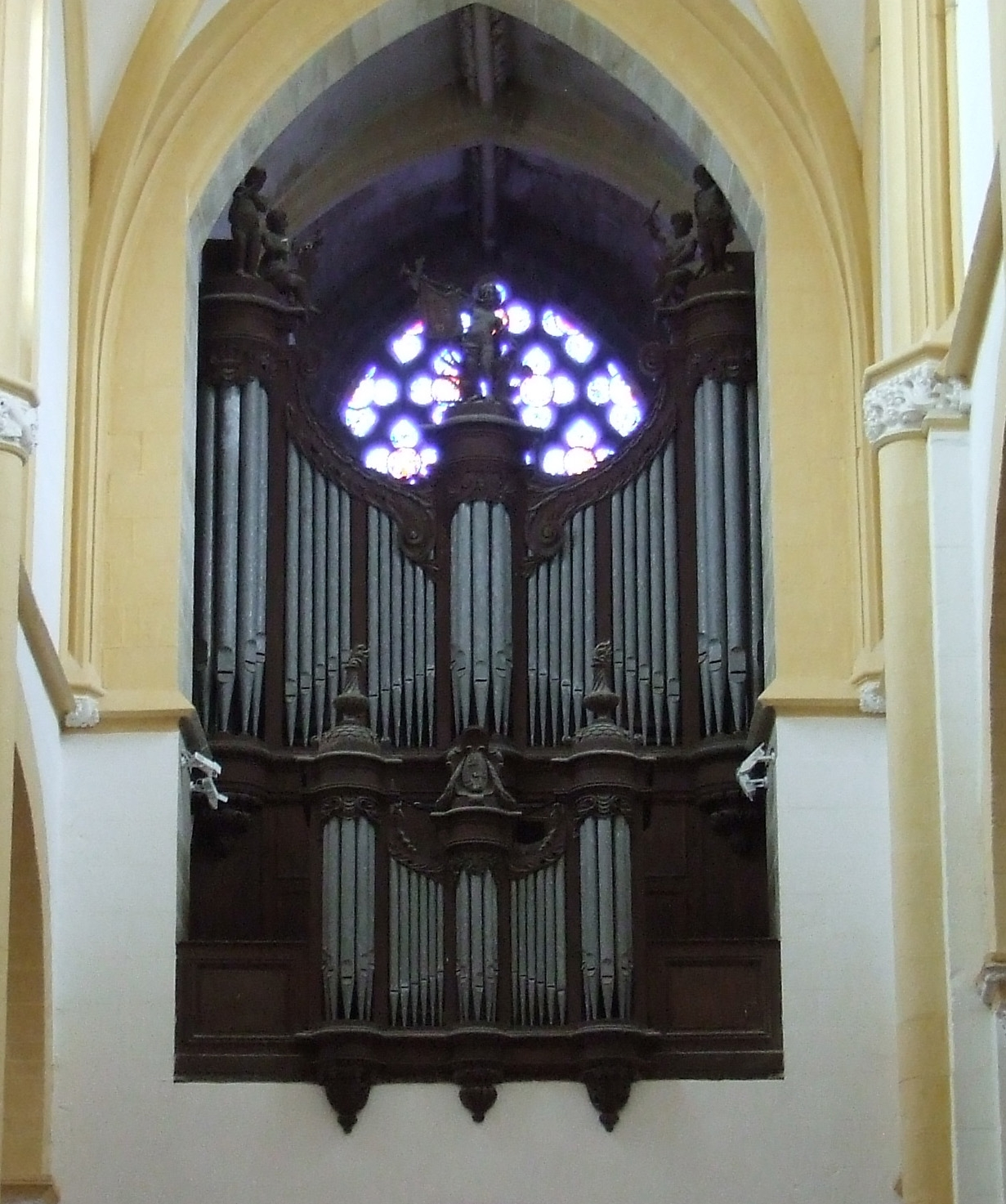
Historical organ built by François Henri Clicquot (1783), Souvigny

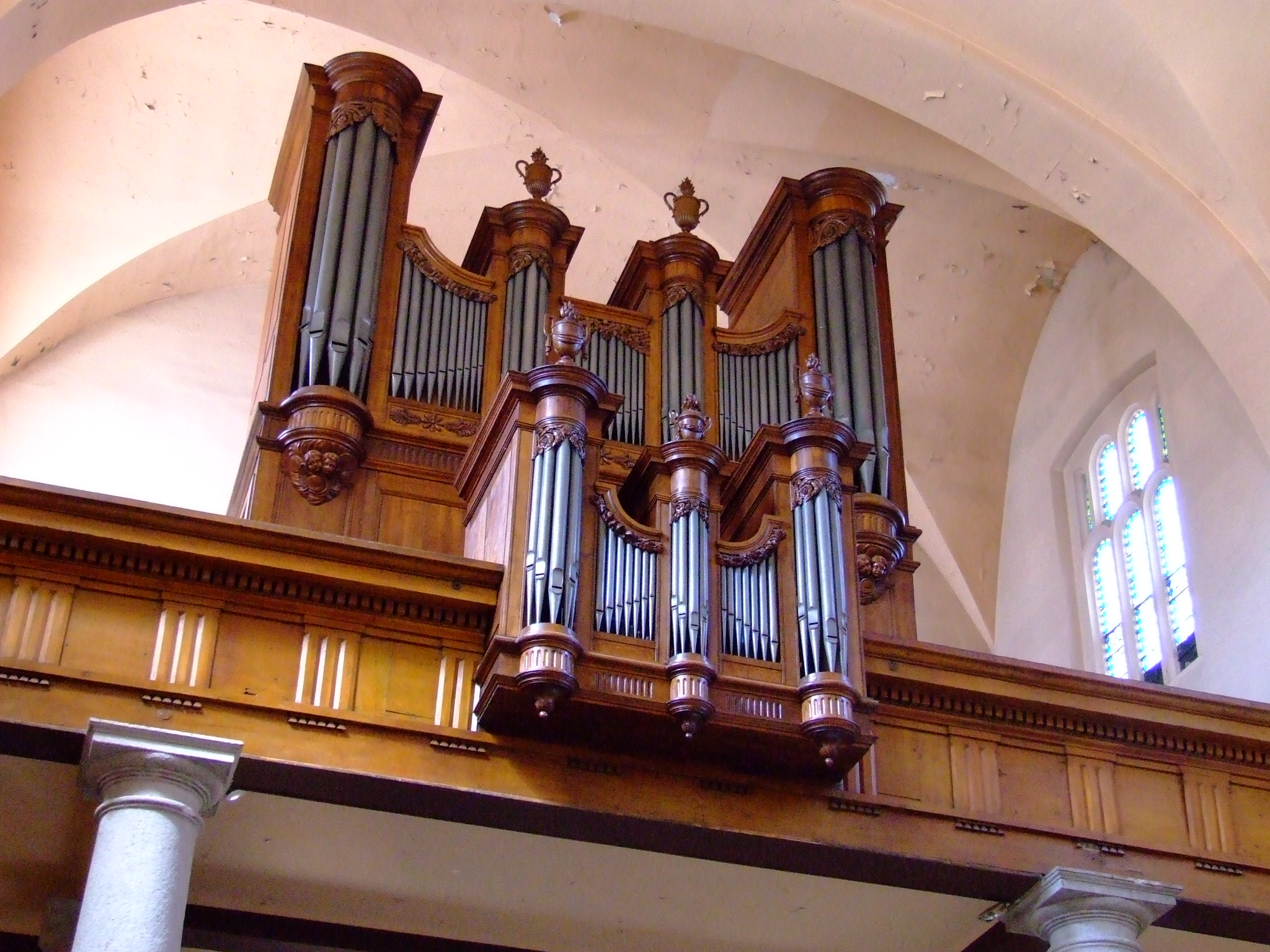
Orgue Callinet (1837), Notre-Dame church, Saint-Étienne

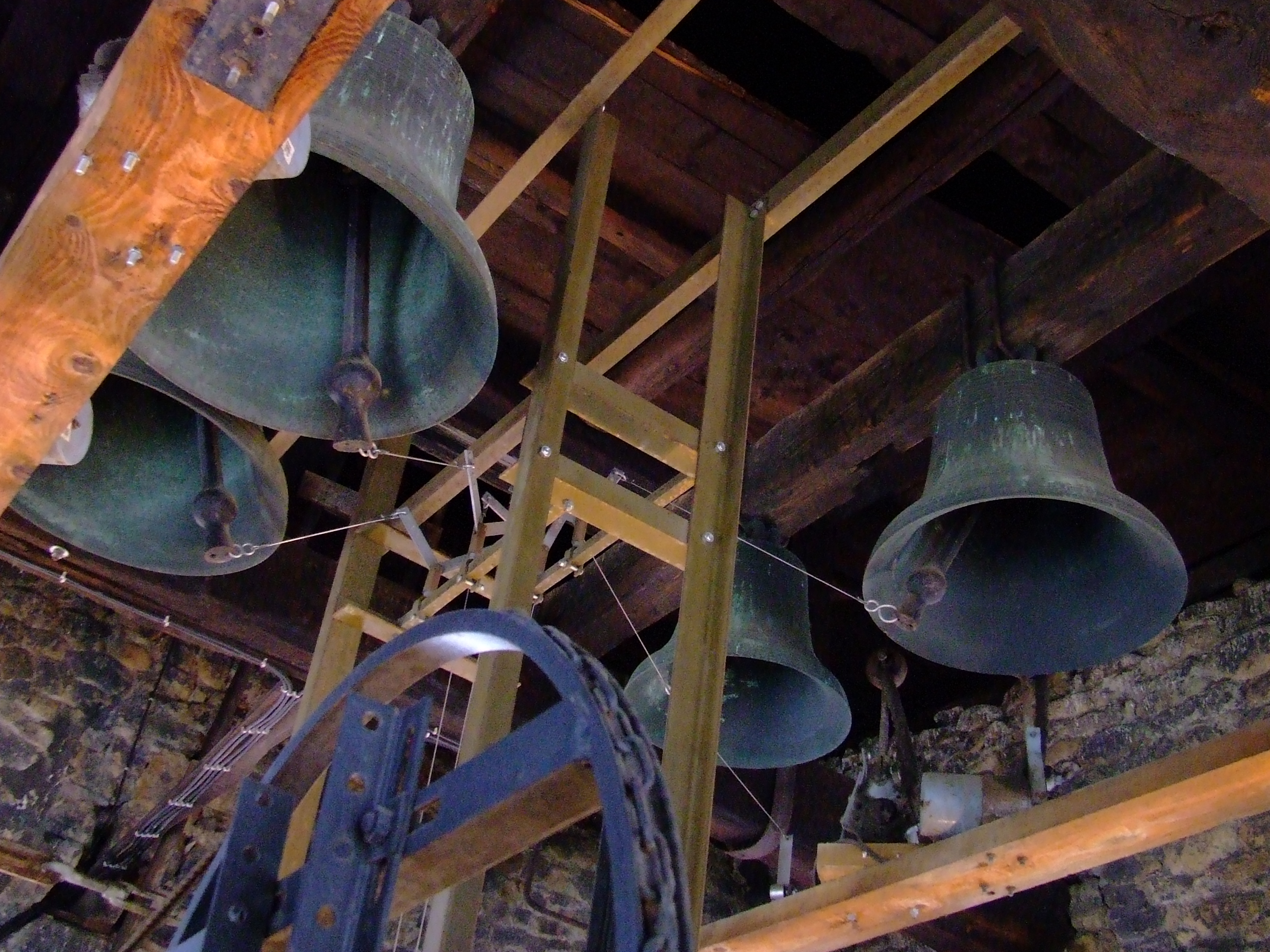
Mechanical chime of Notre-Dame church (detail of small bells), Saint-Étienne
