= René Alix =

French organist, choral conductor and composer

- Born: 14 September 1907; Sotteville-lès-Rouen, France
- Died: 30 December 1966 (aged 59); Paris
- Education: École César Franck
- Occupations: Classical organist; Choral conductor; Composer
- Awards: Grand Prix de la Ville de Paris (1962)

René Alix (14 September 1907 – 30 December 1966) was a French organist, choral conductor and composer.

== Biography ==
Born in Sotteville-lès-Rouen, René Alix studied music in Rouen with Marcel Lanquetuit, in Paris with Georges Caussade and Albert Bertelin. He was organist at the Saint-Michel church of Le Havre from 1929 to 1939. In 1945 he directed the choirs of the RTF then in 1954 he was appointed director of the École César Franck. The author of a reference musical grammar, he has written piano and organ pieces, masses, one string quartet, melodies, symphonic poems, (Les Revenants, Danses, Confidences) and an oratorio, Les Saintes Heures de Jeanne d'Arc (1954).

In 1962, he was awarded the Grand Prix de la Ville de Paris.

Alix died in Paris on 30 December 1966

== Works ==
=== Opera ===
- Yolande, opéra comique (1937)

=== Orchestral music ===
- Revenants, ballade symphonique (1945)
- Suite brève, for piano and strings (1948)
- Concerto pour piano et orchestre, Op. 16 (1949)
- Danses et confidences, suite (1950)

=== Choral music ===
- Les Très saintes heures de Jeanne d'Arc, oratorio (1954)
- Messe, for soloists, choir and orchestra (1955)
- Messe matutinale, for a cappella choir (1958)

=== Chamber music ===
- Sonata for violin and piano (1938)
- 2 string quartets (1954)

== Sources ==
- Alain Pâris, Dictionnaire des interprètes Bouquins/Laffont 1988, (p. 149)
- Baker, Theodore; Slonimsky, Nicolas (1995). Dictionnaire biographique des musiciens Baker's Biographical Dictionary of Musicians. Bouquins (in French). Vol. 1. Paris: Éditions Robert Laffont. p. 57. ISBN 2-221-06510-7.
