= André Isoir =

French organist and pedagogue (1935–2016)

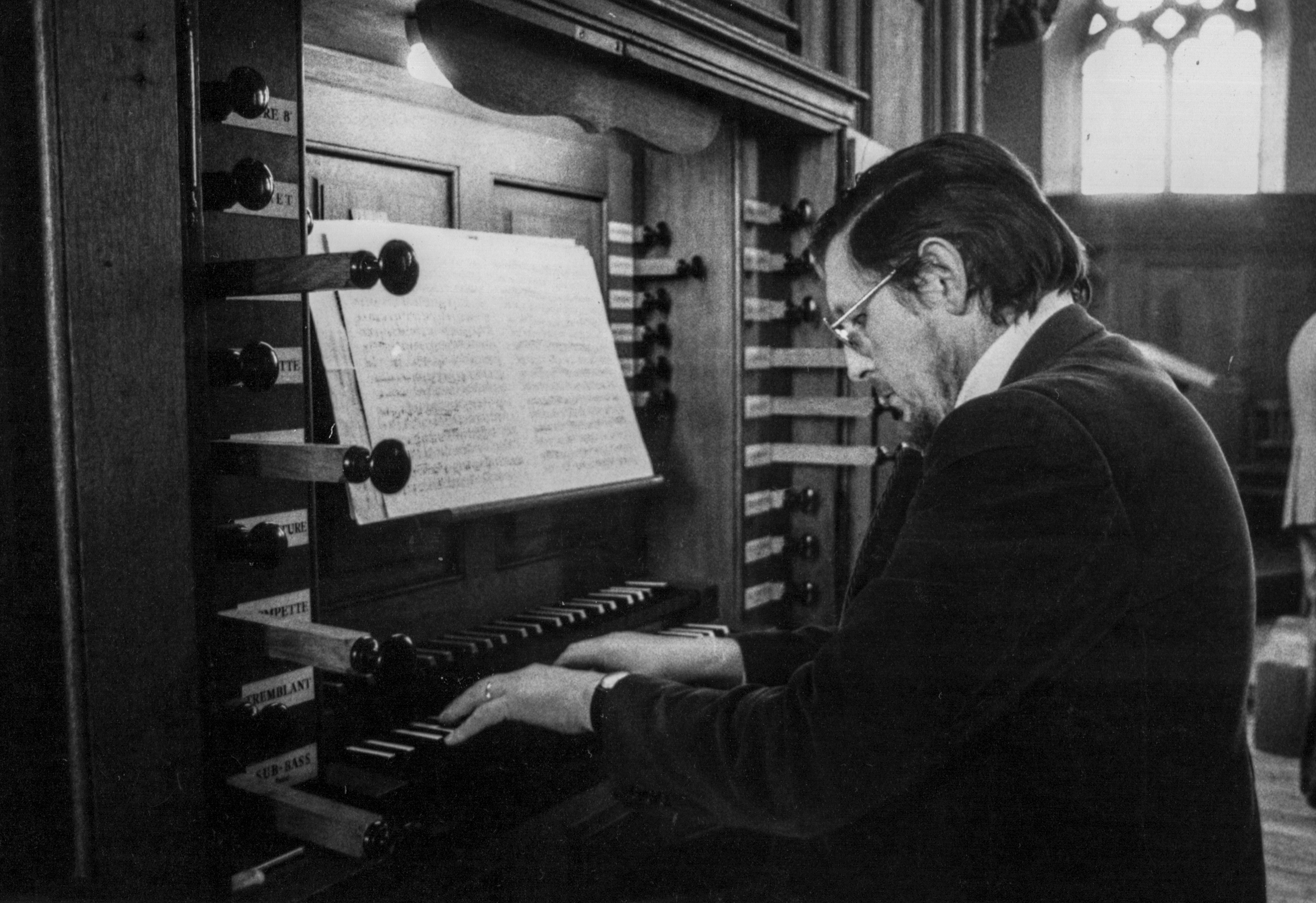
Isoir in Molsheim (1979). Photographer: Claude Truong-Ngoc

André Jean-Marie Isoir (20 July 1935 – 20 July 2016) was a French organist and pedagogue.

== Biography ==
André Isoir was born in 1935 in Saint-Dizier in Grand Est, France.

Isoir studied with Édouard Souberbielle (organ) and Germaine Mounier (piano) at the École César Franck and under Rolande Falcinelli at the Conservatoire de Paris where he won the first prizes in organ and improvisation in 1960.

Thereafter he won several international organ competitions. In 1965 he won the improvisation competition in St Albans (UK). And, in three successive years, he won the competition in Haarlem (Netherlands), earning the "Challenge Award," the only French interpreter to have achieved this distinction since the inception of the competition in 1951.

André Isoir was organist titulaire at St-Médard in Paris from 1952 to 1967 and at St. Severin in 1967. Since 1973 he has been titulaire (head organist) at the ancient Abbey of Saint-Germain-des-Prés in Paris.

In 1974 Isoir was appointed to the organ staff at the Conservatoire d'Orsay, in 1977 promoted to the rank of National School of Music. He became a full professor in January 1978 and remained at Orsay until 1983, when he was appointed to the Conservatoire National de Region de Boulogne-Billancourt, where he taught organ until 1994.

Isoir recorded some sixty discs, notably for Calliope. His recordings have been awarded the Grand Prix du Disque in 1972, 73, 74, 75, 77, 80, 89 and 91 as well as the «Président de la République» prize for "Le Livre d'Or de l'Orgue Français". In February 1974 he was awarded membership of the Friends of the Organ for his "Variations sur un psaume huguenot". He has recorded the complete organ works of J. S. Bach, which remains one of the benchmark performances of Bach's organ music. His recordings of works by César Franck on the organ of the Luçon Cathedral were also highly praised.

André Isoir completed his musical culture by gaining a thorough knowledge of the organ. In his view, knowledge of the instrument contributes to a better approach to different musical styles in terms of both technology and performance.

Isoir was awarded Chevalier des Arts et Lettres by the National Order of Merit, best instrumental soloist of the year to 2nd Victoires de la Musique, and also "Choc de l'année 2000" from the magazine Le Monde de la musique for his interpretation of the Art of Fugue by J.S. Bach. Some of his most notable students have included François Espinasse, Michel Bouvard, Jean Boyer, and others.

He died on 20 July 2016, his 81st birthday, in Longpont-sur-Orge.

His son, Daniel Isoir, is a pianist who founded La Petite Symphonie. Inheriting his father's interests, Daniel Isoir has recorded Franck's piano works.

== Honours and awards ==
- Chevalier of the Ordre des Arts et des Lettres
- Chevalier of the Ordre National du Mérite

== Sources ==
- Entry to André Isoir in the French Wikipedia, translated December 25, 2008, using Google Translate. Retranslated without a translation program and revised May 20, 2010.
