= Pietro Filippo Scarlatti =

Italian composer, organist and choirmaster (1679–1750)

Pietro Filippo Scarlatti (5 January 1679 – 22 February 1750) was an Italian composer, organist, and choirmaster.

He was born in Rome, Papal States, the eldest of Alessandro Scarlatti's children and a brother of composer Domenico Scarlatti and began his musical career in 1705 as choirmaster of the cathedral of Urbino. Three years later, in 1708, his father brought him to Naples, where he became an organist at court. In 1728, his only opera Clitarco was premiered at Naples' Teatro San Bartolomeo; the score has been lost. His other principal works include three cantatas and a multitude of keyboard toccatas, one of which was recorded by Luciano Sgrizzi. He died in Naples in 1750.
