= Labric =

Labric is a surname. Notable people with the surname include:

- Pierre Labric (born 1921), French organist, pedagogue, and composer
- Roger Labric (1893– 1962), French journalist
