= Odile Pierre =

French organist (1932–2020)

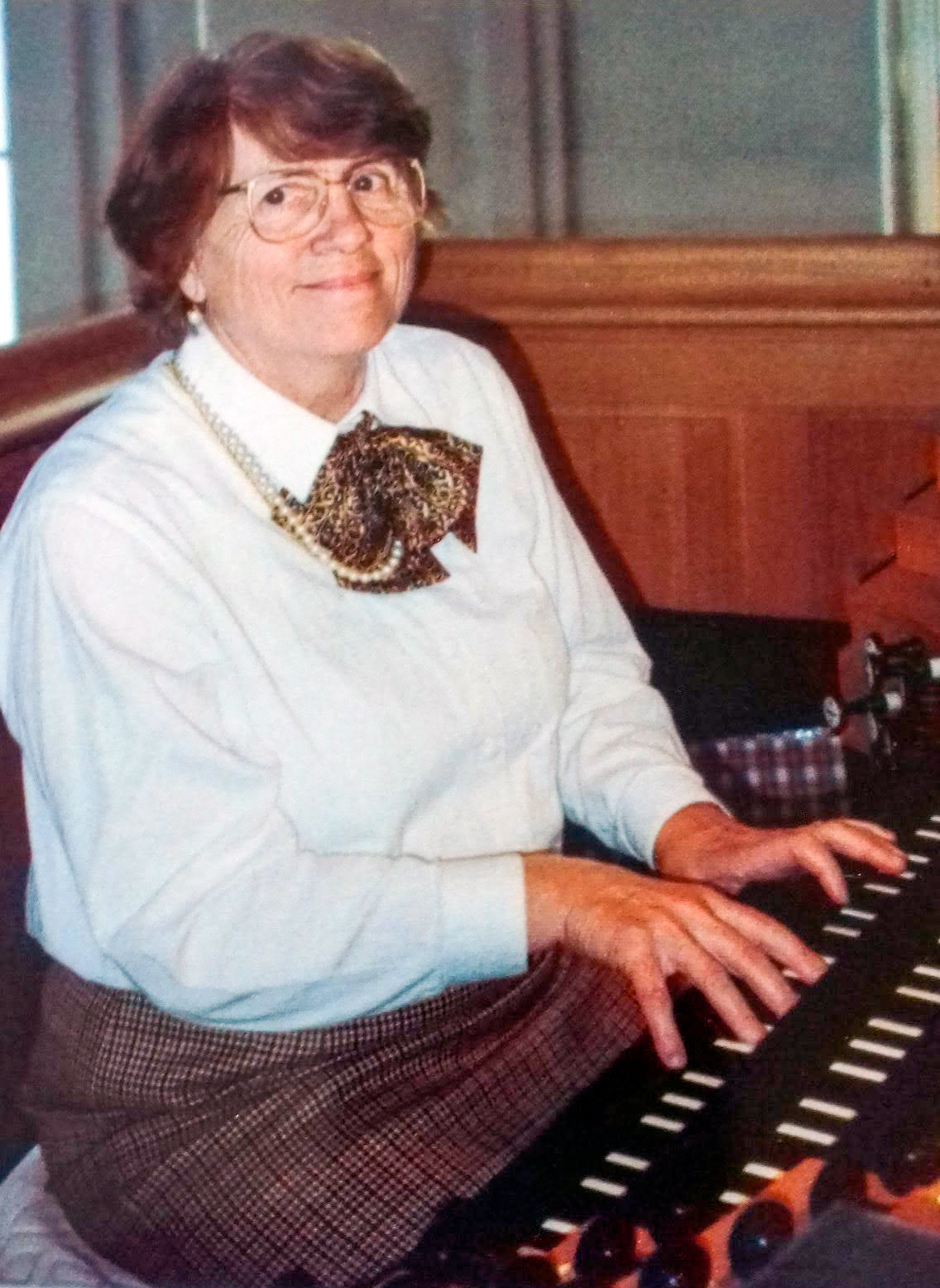
- Odile Pierre in 1990
- Born: 12 March 1932; Pont-Audemer, Normandy, France
- Died: 29 February 2020 (aged 87); Paris, France
- Education: Conservatoire de Rouen; Conservatoire de Paris; Mozarteum
- Occupations: Organist; Academic teacher; Composer
- Organizations: Conservatoire de Rouen; La Madeleine, Paris; Conservatoire de Paris
- Awards: Legion of Honour; Ordre national du Mérite

Odile Marie-Pascale Pierre ([ɔ.dil pjɛʁ]; 12 March 1932 – 29 February 2020) was a French organist, composer and academic teacher. She was the organist at La Madeleine, Paris, and taught organ and improvisation at the Conservatoire de Paris. The last student of Marcel Dupré, she played around 2,000 recitals internationally and made recordings.

== Biography ==
Born on 12 March 1932 in Pont-Audemer, Pierre grew up in Loiret. At age seven, she attended a recital on the Cavaillé-Coll organ of the Church of St. Ouen, Rouen, by Marcel Dupré and then took an interest in the instrument. She was an organist and choir leader at the église de Barentin at age 15. She attended the Conservatoire de Rouen, where she studied with Norbert Dufourcq, Maurice Duruflé, Noël Gallon and Marcel Lanquetuit, and the Conservatoire de Paris, where she with Dupré, awarded a first prize for organ and improvisation in 1955, with unanimous approval of the jury, to which Jeanne Demessieux belonged. At age 23, she was the youngest in his class to receive this distinction. She became Dupré's last living student. Pierre took advanced organ classes with Fernando Germani in Siena, and at the Mozarteum in Salzburg with Franz Sauer.

Pierre was assistant organist to Jean-Jacques Grünenwald at the Paris church Saint-Pierre de Montrouge from 1955 to 1957. She taught organ and music history at the Conservatoire de Rouen from 1959 to 1969. She was the organist at La Madeleine, Paris, from 1969 to 1979, succeeding Demessieux in a post which Gabriel Fauré and Camille Saint-Saëns held before. Pierre taught organ and improvisation at the Conservatoire de Paris from 1981 to 1992. Among her students were Michael Matthes, the organist at Saint-Germain l'Auxerrois in Paris, Ignace Michiels and the English virtuoso D'Arcy Trinkwon. She also taught at the Scuola Internationale d'Alto Perfezionmento Musicale in Perugia and gave master classes internationally. She was also a jury member in international organ competitions.

In 1977, Pierre represented France at the International Organ Congress in Washington, D.C., and Philadelphia. She gave over 2,000 organ recitals throughout her career, including 12 tours to the U.S. and 6 to Asia. She performed at major festivals and played as an organ soloist with conductors including A. de Bavier, Pierre Dervaux, Lorin Maazel and Georges Prêtre. She was a member of the Commission technique consultative pour les orgues (Consultative Commission for the Restoration and Construction of Organs) in Paris from 1977.

Pierre was married to Pierre Aubé. She died on 29 February 2020, 12 days before her 88th birthday.

== Recordings ==
Pierre made several recordings, especially for RCA. She recorded works by Charles-Marie Widor, including his Symphony for Organ No. 5, played on the Sandtner organ of St. Ulrich und Afra in Augsburg. In the 1980s, she recorded at the organ at the Nieuwe Kerk in Katwijk aan Zee, built by Van den Heuvel.

== Publications ==
Pierre composed organ pieces published by Éditions Alphonse Leduc, Schott and Edizioni Carrara. She was the editor for the works of Alexandre Guilmant for Éditions Bornemann. Among her compositions are:

- Fugue-scherzo pour quatuor à vent
- Cantiques et airs bretons
- Quatuor sur deux Noëls hongrois

== Awards ==
Pierre received awards including:

- Silver Medal of the City of Paris
- Officer of the Legion of Honour
- Commander of the Ordre national du Mérite
