= Symphony in C-sharp minor (Sohy) =

1917 symphony by Charlotte Sohy

The Symphony in C♯ minor, Op. 10, subtitled the Great War, is the only symphony by French composer Charlotte Sohy. It was written between 1914 and 1917 during World War I and may have been inspired by the death of Sohy's colleague Albéric Magnard.

== History ==
=== Composition ===
Sohy began work on the symphony in autumn 1914 and completed it October 1917.

The symphony was possibly inspired by the death of Albéric Magnard, in September 1914, who was a family friend of Sohy and her husband Marcel Labey. Sohy's symphony adopts the same key — little used — of C sharp minor as Magnard's Symphony No. 4. Around the same time, Sohy's husband Marcel was mobilised to fight in World War 1. In 1915, Sohy was notified of his death at the front, although this transpired to be false. The symphony, whilst not explicitly programmatic, has a dark, anxious tone, taking the subtitle Grand Guerre (Great War).

=== Performances ===
The symphony was not performed in Sohy's lifetime. It was premiered in June 2019 with the Orchestre de Besançon Franche-Comté conducted by Debora Waldman. Waldman had been introduced to the work by Sohy's grandson, François-Henri Labey, and both worked alongside guest concertmaster François-Marie Drieux to prepare the work for performance. The American premiere took place on 5 March 2024 at the Zilkha Hall of the Hobby Center for the Performing Arts in Houston, Texas. It was performed by the Texas Medical Center Orchestra conducted by Libi Lebel.

== Music ==
The symphony is written for a orchestra of 2 flutes (1 doubling piccolo), 3 oboes (1 doubling cor anglais), 3 clarinets (1 doubling bass clarinet), 2 bassoons, 4 horns, 2 trumpets, 3 trombones, tuba, timpani, harp, and strings.

The symphony is in three movements:

1. Lent. Vif
2. Vif. Lent. Vif
3. Vif

A performance usually lasts around 30 minutes.

== Discography ==
- Orchestre national Avignon-Provence, Debora Waldman (dir.), in Charlotte Sohy: Orchestral Music, La Boîte à Pépites, 2022.
- Orchestre national de France, Debora Waldman (dir.), in Compositrices, New Light on French Romantic Women Composers, 8 CD, vol. 2, Bru Zane, 2023.
- Orchestre national Bordeaux Aquitaine, Bar Avni (dir.), in Symphonies in 3 movements', Alpha, 2026.
