= Édouard Souberbielle =

- Born: 17 June 1899; Tarbes
- Died: 29 January 1986 (aged 86); Clamart
- Occupations: Organist; Kapellmeister

Jacques Auguste Édouard Souberbielle (17 June 1899 – 29 January 1986) was a 20th-century French organist, Kapellmeister and music educator.

== Biography ==
Souberbielle first studied with his mother, a former pupil of Émile Delaborde, son of Charles-Valentin Alkan.

He continued his studies at the Schola Cantorum de Paris with Abel Decaux, Maurice Sergent, and Louis Vierne. In 1925, he obtained a first prize in harmony (under Jules Mouquet) and a first prize in organ (under Eugène Gigout) at the Conservatoire de Paris.

During his career, he was choirmaster or organist of several churches in Paris: Église Notre-Dame-de-la-Croix de Ménilmontant, then St-Ambroise (1929–43), and finally St-Pierre-de-Chaillot and Église Saint-Joseph-des-Carmes.

He married Madeleine, daughter of Léon Bloy. They had a son, Léon Souberbielle (1923–1991), organist, choirmaster, author of a book on Le Plein-Jeu de l’Orgue Français à l'époque classique (1660 – 1740), 1977 (reissued by Delatour).

From 1926, he taught the organ at the Schola Cantorum, then at the École César Franck from 1935, and at the l’Institut catholique de Paris (Gregorian Institute) from 1943. He trained a number of leading organists including Arsène Bedois, Francis Chapelet, Michel Chapuis, Lynne Davis, Jacques Dussouil, André Isoir, Thierry Martin, Philippe Sauvage, Jean-Albert Villard, Odile Bailleux, etc.

== Published works ==
- Jeux d'enfants pour piano, Delatour France (2012). EAN 9790232107240
- Divertissement pour quatuor à cordes, Delatour France (2012). EAN 9790232107257
