= Francis Chapelet =

French organist

Francis Chapelet (born 3 March 1934 in Paris) the son of painter Roger Chapelet, is a French classical organist.

== Career ==
Francis Chapelet started studying the organ at the école César Franck, under the direction of Édouard Souberbielle. He later studied at the Conservatoire de Paris where he won the first prizes in harmony (with Maurice Duruflé as professor), and organ and improvisation (with Rolande Falcinelli) in 1961.

In 1964, he was named co-holder of the organ of the Saint-Séverin in Paris, a position he held for twenty years, and of which he remains an honorary member. He was a member of the two organ commissions (classified, unclassified) of the Ministry of Culture. He is also honorary organist of San Giovanni dei Fiorentini in Rome.

He created the organ class of the Conservatoire de Bordeaux of which he was in charge until 1996.

Francis Chapelet is known to be one of the specialists of Spanish organ and has directed the International Academy of Iberian Organ of Castile. He is also a corresponding member of the Real Academia de Bellas Artes de San Fernando in Madrid.

Honours: Chevalier of the Ordre National du Mérite, Officier of the Ordre des Arts et des Lettres.

== Discography ==
- Series "Orgues Historiques": Covarrubias, ref HMO n°7 Improvisations and Correa de Arauxo, Cabanilles...
- Series "Orgues Historiques": Salamanque, ref n°10 Improvisations
- Series "Orgues Historiques": Frederiksborg - Sweelink and improvisations, ref HM n°16
- Series "Orgues Historiques": Tolède - Improvisations, ref HM 4519.1.24
- Series "Orgues Historiques": Ciudad Rodrigo - Cabezon, Anonymes, Correa de Arauxo, Narvaez, T.L.de Santa Maria..., ref HM n°14
- Series "Orgues Historiques": Trujillo - Improvisations, ref HM 4511 n° 18
- Series "Orgues Historiques": Lisbonne - Improvisations, ref HM 4517 n° 1.22
- Series "Orgues Historiques": Roquemaure - Suite de danses, Attaingnant, Buxtehude, L. Couperin, Swellinck, ref HM4520
- Orgue Renaissance de Roquemaure - Swellink, Scheidt, Buxtehude, L. Couperin, M. Lanes, ref HM 932
- Aux orgues d'Espagne de Trujillo, Salamanque, Covarrubias and Ciudad Rodrigo - Antonio de Cabezon, ref HM Opus 15
- Organs of Lisbonne - Araujo, Cabanilles, Correa de Arauxo ... ref: HM 704
- Orgues des Baléares - Swellinck, Scheidt, Boehm, Fischer, Pachelbel, Scheidemann, ref HM 948
- Series "Grands Organistes" Revival of the Lisbon pieces, Salamanque, Trujillo, Covarrubias and Fredericksborg, ref HM 34757
- Coffret: Orgues d'Espagne - Aux orgues de Salamanque, Trujillo, Tolède, Covarrubias, Palma de Majorque, ref HM765
- Series "Orgues Historiques" n°9 - Organ of Carpentras (P. Quoirin 1974) Cabanilles, P.Bruna, Scheidt, J.S.Bach.
- CD - Orgues Historiques d'Europe - Baléares, Trujillo, Covarrubias - 2CDs ref: HMA 1901226 and HMA 1901225.
- L'orgue contemporain à Notre Dame de Paris - ETNA 71 (in collaboration with Haroun Tazieff) ref: FY Solstice SOCD 192
- El Organo Castellano - Abarca de Campos et Frechilla - Anonymous, Soto de Langa, Cabezon, M.Lopez, Cabanilles... ref: Valois V4653
- Les chemins de l'orgue en Aquitaine - Organs of Montpon-Ménestérol and Vanxains, Échourgnac, Chantérac.
- Church of the Holy Cross, Bordeaux - Organ Dom Bedos - F. Couperin, Grigny, Guilain, Dandrieu and improvisation
- Organ of Grignan - live, Dandrieu, Correa de Arauxo, Swellinck, J.S.Bach and improvisations.
- Music for two organs in Cusco Cathedral - (with Uriel Valadeau) L. Couperin, Soto de Langa, Cabezon, Pasquini ...

== Bibliography ==
- Chapelet, Francis, L'Œuvre pour orgue (volume 1: Pièces et improvisations dans l'esthétique classique, volume 2: Pièces et improvisations dans le style modal et contemporain), éditions Delatour, 2013.
- Chapelet, Francis, Livre d'improvisation et d'accompagnement, éditions Les presses de la Double, 2002, 68 pages.
- Chapelet, Francis, Les Orgues de Montpon-Ménestérol, Les Presses de la Double.
- Chapelet, Francis, Chroniques en Chamade, SIC Éditions in Brussel.
- Chapelet, Francis, L'orgue Espagnol, Les Presses de la Double (a collection of Iberian music scores from the 16th to 18th century).
