= Fernand Préfontaine =

Canadian architect (1888–1949)

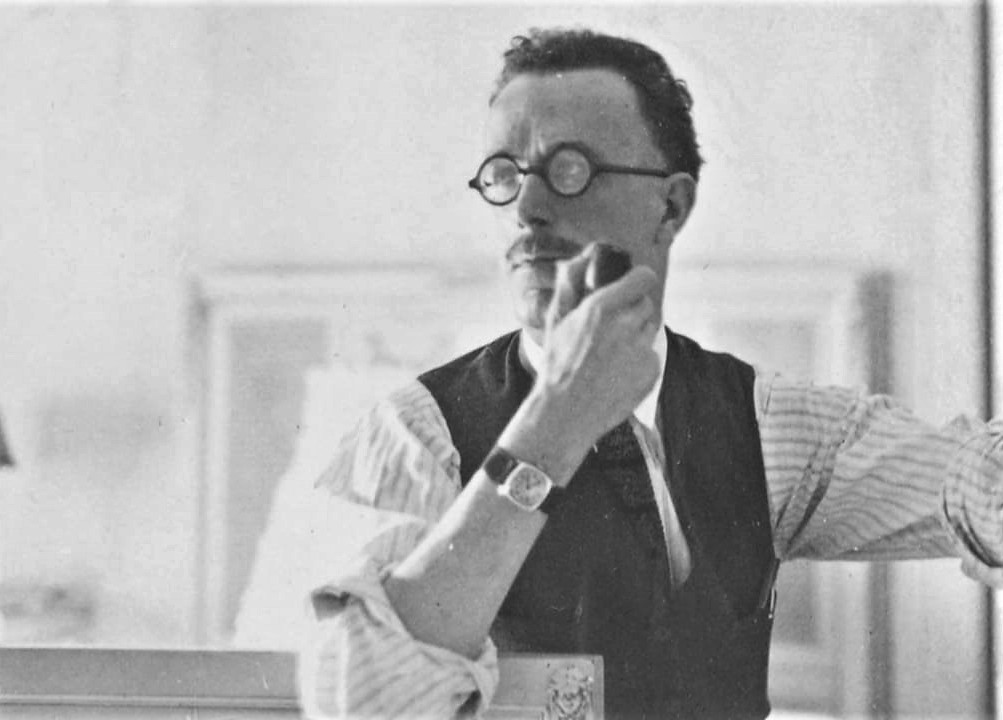
Préfontaine, c. 1920

Fernand Préfontaine (January 18, 1888 — January 10, 1949) was a Canadian architect, photographer, and art critic. Born in Montreal, Quebec, he completed his degree in architecture at the Polytechnique Montréal at the Université de Montréal in 1911. In 1918, he co-founded the progressive arts magazine Le Nigog with pianist and composer Léo-Pol Morin and writer Robert de Roquebrune. He pursued further studies in Paris, arriving there in 1919, at the École des Beaux-Arts and the École du Louvre; earning degrees in art history and archaeology.

He worked as an architect in Montreal and died there on January 10, 1949, aged 60.
