= Pierre Labric =

French organist, pedagogue and composer (born 1921)

- Born: Pierre André Labric; 30 June 1921 (age 104); Conches-en-Ouche, Eure, Normandy
- Genres: Classical
- Occupations: Musician, composer, tutor
- Instrument: Organ

Pierre André Labric (born 30 June 1921) is a French organist, pedagogue, and composer.

== Biography ==
Born in Conches-en-Ouche in Eure, Normandy, Labric studied organ at the Rouen Conservatoire with Marcel Lanquetuit (Prix d'honneur 1941), and at the Paris Conservatoire with organ under Marcel Dupré and harmony under Maurice Duruflé (he received the first prize for organ (improvisation and interpretation) in 1948, along with Pierre Cochereau). Later, he studied organ privately with Jeanne Demessieux, whose complete organ works he recorded in the 1970s. During her tenure as titular organist at La Madeleine in Paris, he was her assistant and substitute. He also substituted for Pierre Cochereau at Notre Dame Cathedral in Paris. Labric was titular organist at Saint-Gervais in Rouen.

He turned 100 on 30 June 2021.

Labric recorded the complete organ symphonies of Louis Vierne and Charles-Marie Widor. Both of these were world première recordings. In addition, he recorded the Preludes and Fugues of Camille Saint-Saëns and the Promenades en Provence of Eugène Reuchsel.

Labric's students include:

- Julien Bret, titular organist at Saint-Ambroise, Paris
- Dominique Chevalier, titular organist at Saint-Calixte, Lambersart
- Marguerite de Jouvencel, assistant organist at Saint-Germain, Saint-Germain-en-Laye
- Michael Matthes, titular organist at Saint-Germain l'Auxerrois, Paris
- Maxime Patel, assistant organist at La Trinité, Paris, (1999-2011)

== Compositions ==
=== Organ ===
- Hommage à Jeanne Demessieux (Homage to Jeanne Demessieux); Paris: Durand, 1970
1. Allegro
2. Largo
3. Fugue
- Deux louanges à Notre-Dame des Roses (Two panegyrics to Our Lady of the Roses); unpublished
1. Arrivederci
2. Salve Mater

== Editor ==
- Franz Liszt: Funérailles. Transcription pour orgue de Jeanne Demessieux, réconstituée par Pierre Labric. Sampzon: Delatour France, 2011.

== Discography ==
- Jeanne Demessieux: L'œuvre pour orgue
  - Te Deum op. 11, Répons pour le temps de Pâques, Douze Choral-Préludes op. 8, Triptyque op. 7, Prélude et Fugue en Ut op. 13, Sept Méditations sur le Saint Esprit op. 6, Six études op. 5. Pierre Labric: Hommage à Jeanne Demessieux. Recorded in July 1971 (Te Deum), December 1971 (Choral-Preludes, Répons), October 1972 (Méditations, Études), November 1972 (Triptyque, Prélude et Fugue) and April 1974 (Hommage) at Saint-Ouen, Rouen, and Saint Pierre, Angoulême (Six études, Sept Méditations). Sigean: Solstice, 2017. 2 CDs.
- Jeanne Demessieux: Pièces pour orgue
  - Six études op. 5, Méditations sur le Saint-Esprit op. 6 (nos. 2 & 7), Triptyque op. 7, Attende Domine (Choral-Preludes op. 8), Te Deum op. 11. Pierre Labric: Hommage à Jeanne Demessieux (first movement). Recorded in 1969 and 1972 at Notre-Dame de Paris. Sigean: Solstice, 2010. 1 CD.
- Franz Liszt: Pièces pour orgue
  - Prélude et fugue sur BACH; Fantaisie et fugue sur le choral "Ad nos"; Funérailles (transcribed by Jeanne Demessieux); Variations sur "Weinen, Klagen". Recorded 24–25 November 1973 and 28–30 April 1974 at Saint-Ouen, Rouen. Sigean: Solstice, 2010. SOCD 264. 1 CD.
- Felix Mendelssohn: Les six sonates. Recorded at Saint-Ouen, Rouen. Sigean: Solstice, 2015. SOCD 303. 1 CD.
- Camille Saint-Saëns: Six préludes et fugues
  - Préludes et fugues, op. 99 and 109. Eugène Gigout: Grand chœur dialogué (1881). Recorded in 1973/74 at Saint-Ouen, Rouen. Sigean: Solstice, 2015. SOCD 305. 1 CD.
- Eugène Reuchsel: Promenades en Provence
  - Nuages ensoleillés sur le cap Nègre, Le moulin d'Alphonse Daudet, La chartreuse de Montrieux au crépuscule, Jour de fête aux Saintes-Maries-de-la-Mer, Profil de la porte d'Orange à Carpentras, Tambourinaires sur la place des Vieux Salins, Grandes orgues à Saint-Maximin, Visions à l'Abbaye de Sénanque. Recorded between 1970 and 1974 at Saint-Ouen, Rouen. Sigean: Solstice, 2013. SOCD 289. 1 CD.
- Louis Vierne: Les six symphonies pour orgue
  - Recorded in November 1969 and November 1970 at Saint Sernin, Toulouse. Sigean: Solstice, 2011. SOCD 277/9. 3 CD's.
- Louis Vierne: Pièces en style libre, Les deux Messes, Triptyque
  - Recorded at Saint-Ouen, Rouen. Sigean: Solstice, 2012. SOCD 286/8. 3 CD's.
- Louis Vierne: Les pièces de fantaisie
  - Recorded at Saint-Ouen, Rouen. Sigean: Solstice, 2013. SOCD 290/1. 2 CD's.
- Œuvres de Louis Vierne et Charles-Marie Widor
  - Recorded at Notre-Dame de Paris. Sigean: Solstice, 2013. SOCD 296. 1 CD.
- Charles-Marie Widor: Premiere et deuxième symphonies
  - Recorded in July, October and December 1971 at Saint-Ouen, Rouen. Sigean: Solstice, 2023. SOCD 403. 1 CD.
- Charles-Marie Widor: Troisième et quatrième symphonies
  - Recorded in July, October and December 1971 at Saint-Ouen, Rouen. Sigean: Solstice, 2023. SOCD 405. 1 CD.
- Charles-Marie Widor: Cinquième et sixième symphonies
  - Recorded in July, October and December 1971 at Saint-Ouen, Rouen. Sigean: Solstice, 2023. SOCD 396. 1 CD.
- Charles-Marie Widor: Septième et huitième symphonies
  - Recorded in July, October and December 1971 at Saint-Ouen, Rouen. Sigean: Solstice, 2023. SOCD 407/8. 2 CD's.
- Charles-Marie Widor: Neuvième et dixième symphonies
  - Recorded in July, October and December 1971 at Saint-Ouen, Rouen. Sigean: Solstice, 2023. SOCD 400. 1 CD.
- Pierre Labric: Concert d'orgue I
  - Henry Purcell: Trumpet tune. Johann Sebastian Bach: Fuga sopra il Magnificat BWV 733, Fantasia et Fuga in G minor BWV 542. César Franck: Pastorale. Louis Vierne: Carillon de Westminster. Recorded at St. Ouen, Rouen. Rouen: Grand Orgue. LCM 760110. 1 LP.
- Pierre Labric: Concert d'orgue II
  - Eugène Gigout: Grand chœur dialogué. Felix Mendelssohn: Sonata II. Louis Vierne: Trois Improvisations; reconstituted by Maurice Duruflé. Albert Roussel: Prélude et fughetta. Franz Liszt: Prélude et fugue sur le nom de BACH, Adagio in D-flat major. Recorded November 1973, April and October 1973 at St. Ouen, Rouen. Rouen: Grand Orgue. RLM 770511. 1 LP.
- Unreleased Recordings:
  - César Franck: Final. Johann Sebastian Bach: Preludes and Fugues. Louis Vierne: Triptyque, Quatre Pièces en style libre. Jean-Claude Touche: Complete Organ Works (Pastorale, Scherzetto, Fugue, Elévation, Thème et variations sur Veni Creator). Jacques Ibert: Trois Pièces. Recorded during the 1970s, but never commercially released.

== Bibliography ==
- Eschbach, Jesse. "An Interview with Pierre Labric." The Diapason' 111, no. 2 (February 2020): 14–16.
- Labric, Pierre. "Jeanne Demessieux (1921-1968): Pariser Orgellegende von La Madeleine." Organ: Journal für die Orgel 2, no. 2 (1999): 36–38.
- Labric, Pierre. "Jeanne Demessieux: Présentation des œuvres pour orgue." In: Association Maurice et Marie-Madeleine Duruflé (ed.) (2009): Hommage à Jeanne Demessieux. Bulletin no. 9 (2009), 70–75.
- Labric, Pierre. "Jeanne Demessieux: Analyse de l'œuvre pour orgue." In: Association Maurice et Marie-Madeleine Duruflé (ed.) (2009): Hommage à Jeanne Demessieux. Bulletin no. 9 (2009), 76–96.
- Tréfouel, Dominique. Interview with Pierre Labric on August 20, 2005. In: Dominique Tréfouel, Jeanne Demessieux. Lyon, France: J2C/ALDRUI Éditions, 2005, 97–107.
