= Vincent Berthier de Lioncourt =

French composer (born 1947)

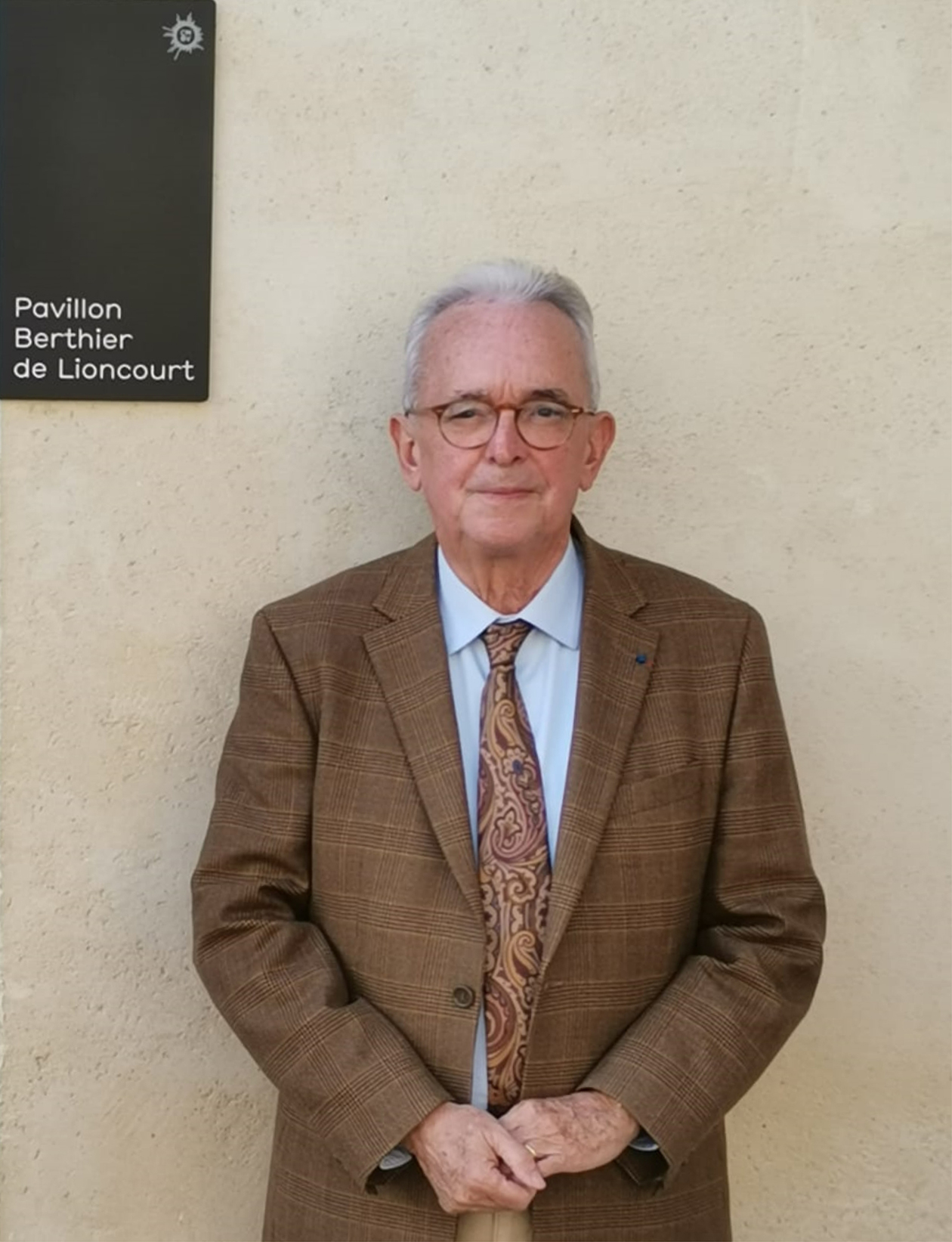
Vincent Berthier de Lioncourt

Vincent Berthier de Lioncourt (born 1947 in Auxerre) is a French musician and, with Philippe Beaussant, co-founder of the Centre de Musique Baroque de Versailles.

He directed Ensemble Vocal de Neuilly, from 1969 to 1976. He is president of Musique en Morvan. He is a director of Music and dance, for the Dijon Region Cultural Affairs, Minister of Culture (France).

He is the son of Jacques Berthier, and Germaine de Lioncourt (daughter of the composer Guy de Lioncourt).
