= Luciano Sgrizzi =

Italian harpsichordist, organist, pianist and composer (1910–1994)

Luciano Sgrizzi (30 October 1910 – 11 September 1994) was an Italian harpsichordist, organist, pianist and composer.

== Life and career ==
Luciano Sgrizzi was born in Bologna on October 30, 1910. His father, Domenico Sgrizzi, was a postal worker who died when Luciano was six years old. At the age of 13 he began studies as a pianist at the Accademia Filarmonica di Bologna. From July 1924 through January 1927 he toured South America accompanied by his mother and uncle as chaperones during his two and a half year long concert tour of that continent.

Upon his return to Italy in 1927, Sgrizzi entered the Parma Conservatory where he graduated with separate degrees in music composition in 1929 and organ performance in 1930. This was followed by a third diploma, a post-graduate degree (equivalent to a doctorate in the United States) in piano performance in 1931. Not wanting to be associated with the Fascist regime, he left Italy and studied musicology and composition with Albert Bertelin in Paris.

He settled in Switzerland, where he remained throughout the Second World War, working as pianist and organist for Swiss-Italian Radio in Lugano (with which he worked until 1974), and also as a literary critic, writing plays and arranging literary works for the radio. In 1946 he became interested in the harpsichord, and devoted himself thereafter to the study of early music. He performed with the Società Cameristica di Lugano from 1950 to 1960. Salzburg, Ascona, Stresa, Spoleto, Rome, Milan, Paris, Liege, Flanders and Geneva were some of the festivals where he appeared as harpsichordist or pianist.

He had been publishing his own compositions since 1933, but in 1960 devoted himself full-time to the transcription and editing of 17th- and 18th-century Italian music. His editions included the Sonates pour clavecin of Benedetto Marcello, and Neuf toccates pour clavier by Alessandro Scarlatti.

He made a number of recordings, of which seven were awarded the Grand Prix du Disque. These included the complete concertos of Antonio Vivaldi and Johann Sebastian Bach for solo harpsichord, and many of the sonatas of Domenico Scarlatti.

In 1980 he was named Commendatore of the Order of Merit of the Italian Republic and in 1985 was named Officier of the Ordre des Arts et des Lettres by French Cultural Minister Jack Lang. He died in Monte Carlo, (Monaco), where he had lived for the last few years of his life.

== Compositions ==
- Dancing Song: Valzer (1933)
- Concerto for piano and orchestra (1935)
- String trio (1935)
- Concerto per orchestra (1936)
- Impressioni (1936)
- Introduction and Scherzo, flute and piano (1937)
- Paesaggi (1951)
- Suite Napoletana (1951)
- Englische Suite nach Werken der Virginaliste (English Suite; 1952, orchestra)
- Suite Belge (1952; orchestra; d'après des œuvres de clavecinistes belges du 18ème siècle)
- Viottiana, divertimento (1954)
- Sinfonietta Rococo (1956)
- Elegy and Scherzo, flute, bassoon and piano (1957)
- Suite-Serenata (1958)
- Ostinati, piano (1958).

== Recordings ==
- Eighteenth-century Italian harpsichord music (1966)
- Gioachino Rossini: Péchés de vieillesse (1967; 9 selections, played on piano)
- Rossini: Petite Messe Solennelle (1969; with Hanneke van Bork, Margaret Lensky, Serge Maurer, James Loomis, Chorus of the Società Cameristica di Lugano; Luciano Sgrizzi, Georges Bernand, pianos; Bruno Canino, harmonium; Edwin Loehrer, conductor)
- Music for two harpsichords (1970; with Huguette Dreyfus; works by Johann Christoph Bach, Johann Sebastian Bach, Wilhelm Friedemann Bach, and Johann Ludwig Krebs)
- Muzio Clementi: 3 Sonatas and 10 Waltzes (1970)
- Joseph Haydn: Sonatas for piano; Fantasia in C major (1970; 4 sonatas, played on hammerklavier)
- The Iberian followers of Domenico Scarlatti (1970; harpsichord; works by Padre Antonio Soler, Carlos Seixas, and Manuel Biasco de Nebra)
- Clementi: Clementi interprété au piano par Luciano Sgrizzi (1973)
- Carl Philipp Emanuel Bach: Concertos in F major and E flat major, for piano, harpsichord, and orchestra (1973; with Robert Veyron-Lacroix, piano; Jean-François Paillard Chamber Orchestra, Jean-François Paillard, conductor)
- C. P. E. Bach: Six sonatas with varied repeats (1980)
- Francesco Cavalli: Ercole amante (1981; 3 discs; with Felicity Palmer, Patricia Miller, Yvonne Minton, Ulrik Cold, English Bach Festival Chorus, English Bach Festival Baroque Orchestra, Michel Corboz, conductor)
- Domenico Scarlatti: Complete works for harpsichord (1982; 11 discs containing 185 sonatas)

== Sources ==
- Bach Cantatas
