= Charlotte Sohy =

French composer (1887–1955)

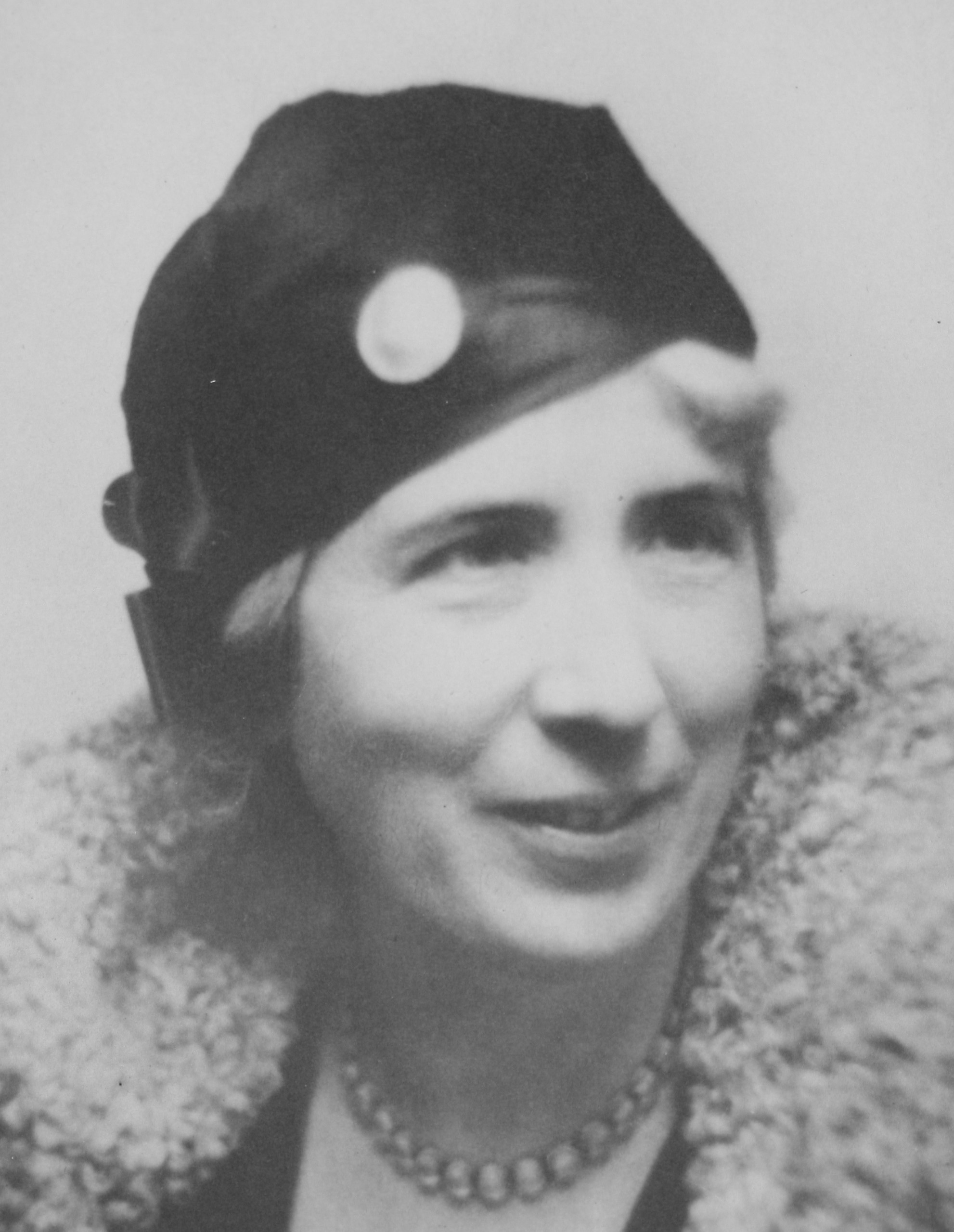
- Sohy c. 1932
- Born: Charlotte Marie Louise Durey; 7 July 1887; Paris, France
- Died: 19 December 1955 (aged 68); Paris, France
- Occupation: Composer
- Spouse: Marcel Labey (m. 1909)

Charlotte Sohy (7 July 1887 - 19 December 1955) was a French composer.

== Early life and education ==
Charlotte Sohy was born as Charlotte Marie Louise Durey on 7 July 1887 in Paris, the daughter of an industrialist. She was introduced to music from a young age, beginning her studies on piano under Cécile Boutet de Monvel (who was related to and studied under César Franck). In 1903, she received a Cavaillé-Coll organ, which likely pushed her towards a musical and compositional career.

She continued her musical studies at the Schola Cantorum (Paris), where she studied organ with Alexandre Guilmant and later with Louis Vierne, as well as composition with Vincent d'Indy. She would also be inspired by her studies and friendships with Nadia Boulanger and Mel Bonis.

== Personal life ==
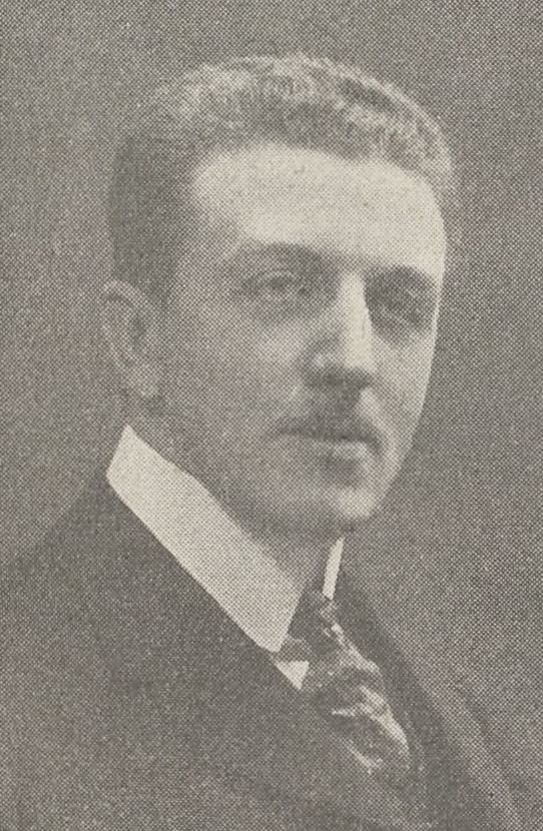
Marcel Labey

On 12 June 1909 she married the composer Marcel Labey, with whom she had seven children. At their home on Rue Greuze 24 they organized musical gatherings, inviting personalities from the artworld. She wrote the libretto for the lyrical drama Bérengère composed by her husband that was published in 1912 under the pseudonym Charles Sohy. Labey, who was a conductor of the Société Nationale de Musique, championed his wife's compositions, programming them throughout the 1920s and 30s.

She was the cousin of Louis Durey, a member of Les Six.

== Career ==
As a composer in her own right, Charlotte Sohy wrote masses, art songs, piano pieces, trios, string quartets, in addition to a symphony and the lyrical drama L'Esclave couronnée, composed between 1917 and 1921. She signed her works under the names of Sohy, Charlotte Sohy, Charles Sohy, Ch. Sohy, and Charlotte Sohy-Labey, and often used other pen names such as Louis Rivière or Claude Vincent.

Her musical compositions were performed by Paul Dukas, Maurice Ravel, and Gabriel Fauré frequently at the Salon of Marguerite de Saint-Marceaux, where she and her husband were regulars (he starting in 1908, she in 1913). After the first World War, Charlotte Sohy's pieces were performed less often.

In Florence Launay's list of the most important female composers who were active in 19th century France, Sohy's life and creative period falls between those of Lili and Nadia Boulanger, who were her contemporaries. She is one of the approximately 20 women who, between 1789 and 1914, achieved professional status and public success as composers.

== Compositions ==
The complete works of Charlotte Sohy, published as Présence Compositrices, comprises 35 opus numbers.

=== Vocal works ===
- Berceuse triste, op. 1, for soprano and piano, text by Sohy (1905)
- Chants de la Lande, op. 4, for mezzo-soprano and piano, text by Sohy (1908)
- Trois chants nostalgiques, op. 7, for mezzo-soprano and piano (or orchestra), text by Cyprien Halgan (1910)
- Poème, op. 8, for Alto, Baritone, Choir and Orchester (1911), premiered by Claire Croiza and Morel under the direction of Marcel Labey on 24 May 1913 at the Société nationale de musique
- Les quatre rencontres de Bouddha, op. 9, for Vocal quartet, flute, clarinet, string quartet, harp and piano. Text von Louis Rivière (1912–1913).
- L'Esclave couronnée, op. 12, drama in three acts, text by Sohy after Selma Lagerlöf (1917–1921),
- Deux poèmes chantés, op. 17, for Baritone (or Mezzo-soprano) and piano (or orchestra), text by Camille Mauclair (1922)
- Méditations, op. 18, for Soprano and piano, text by Sohy (1922)
- Messe sur des cantiques bretons, op. 32, for mixed voices, two violins, cello and organ (1945)

=== Choral music ===
- Adoro te, op. 2, for SATB choir (1906)
- Les Mains lentes, op. 16, text by Camille Mauclair
- Deux chœurs, op. 20, text by Victor Hugo and Eugène Le Mouël (1923)
- Messe, op. 22, for three voices and organ (1930)
- Conseils à la mariée, op. 26, for female choir and piano (1938)
- Conseils à la bergère, op. 27, for men's choir (1939)
- Messe a cappella, op. 31, for SATB choir (1944)
- Cantique à Sainte Claire, op. 35, for female choir and organ, text by Sohy (1953)

=== Symphonic music ===
- Symphonie in cis-Moll, "Grande Guerre" (The Great War), op. 10 (1914–1917)
- Thème varié, op. 15, for violin and orchestra (1921)
- Danse mystique, op. 19, symphonic poem (1922)
- Histoire sentimentale, op. 34, film composition (1952)

=== Chamber music ===
- Prélude, op. 5, for violin and piano (1909)
- Petite suite, op. 13, piano trio (1921)
- Thème varié, op. 15, for violin and piano (1921)
- Triptyque champêtre, op. 21, for flute, violin, viola, cello and harp (1925)
- Octobre, op. 23 no 1, for celli and piano (1931)
- Sérénade ironique, op. 23 no 2, for eight celli (1931)
- Trio, op. 24, piano trio (1931)
- String quartet No. 1, op. 25 (1933)
- String quartet No. 2, op. 33 (1945–1947)

=== Works for piano ===
- Fantaisie, op. 3 (1907)
- Sonate, op. 6 (1909–1910), premiered at Salle Pleyel in April 1910 by the Société nationale de musique
- Deux pièces, op. 11, for four hands (1919)
- Six pièces, op. 14 (1921)
- Tambourins, op. 29 (1943)
- Quatre pièces romantiques, op. 30 (1944)
