= Marcel Lanquetuit =

Marcel Louis Robert Lanquetuit (8 June 1894 – 21 May 1985) was a French composer, organist, conductor, improviser and teacher of music.

== Life ==
Marcel Lanquetuit was born in 1894 in Rouen, Normandy, France. His father, Charles (1860–1932), was a church musician at the church of St-Godard de Rouen. Lanquetuit began his musical studies in his hometown under Albert Dupré, and then began learning the organ and music theory (harmony, counterpoint, fugue) privately with Albert's son Marcel Dupré. From 1910 to 1914, he played the organ at St-Godard de Rouen. Meanwhile, he continued his studies. In 1913, he studied at the Paris Conservatory of Music under Eugène Gigout, and in 1914 won the Conservatory's 1st prize for organ. He served in the armed forces from 1914–1919, and in 1918 he married Marcelle Lacombe. They had one son, Pierre, an architect.

He became principal organist at St-Godard de Rouen in 1920.

In 1926, he made a recital tour of the United States, visiting New York City, Princeton and Philadelphia (where he played the famous Wanamaker Organ, by some measures the largest pipe organ in the world, in Wanamaker's department store).

In 1938, he was appointed principal organist at Rouen Cathedral, and retained this position until 1978. He also filled in from time to time at the church of Saint-Sulpice, Paris when Marcel Dupré was on tour.

He taught privately, and was the substitute for Marcel Dupré at the Paris Conservatory before the Second World War. He was then professor of organ at the Rouen Conservatory for 15 years, where his students included Pierre Labric, Bernard Havel, Jean-Claude Touche, Odile Pierre, René Alix and Marie-Thérèse Duthoit (his successor in Rouen).

He died in 1985 at the hospital in Bois-Guillaume, Normandy.

== Work ==
Only a few of Lanquetuit's works have been preserved. He preferred to improvise, and a large part of his work was destroyed by a fire in his house in 1940. His reputation as a composer is based primarily on a Toccata in D major, published in 1927 by Éditions Alphonse Leduc. He also wrote a short Intermezzo for organ in G major.

== Awards ==
- 1934: He was received into the Académie des sciences, belles-lettres et arts de Rouen on 9 March 1934 with a speech on the musical improvisation style of Marcel Dupré.
- 1958: Knight of the Legion of Honour (Chevalier de la Légion d'honneur)
- 1961: Knight of the Order of St Gregory the Great (Chevalier de l’Ordre de Saint-Grégoire-le-Grand)

== See also ==
- fr:Église Saint-Godard de Rouen, article in French Wikipedia about the church
