= Michael Matthes =

French organist

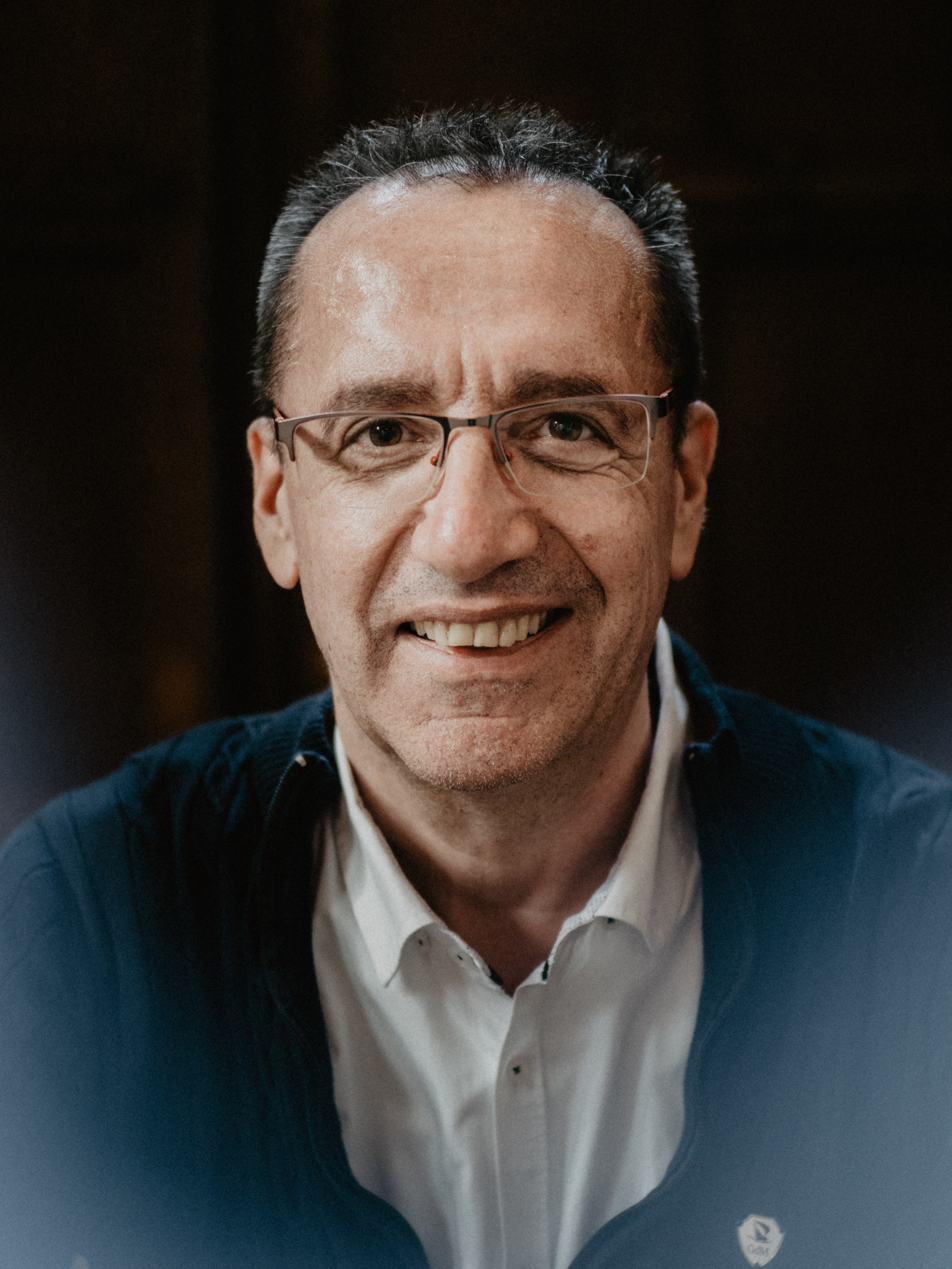

Michael Matthes (born 26 February 1966, Stuttgart) is a French organist.

== Education ==
Matthes received his first organ lessons privately from Marie-Claire Alain. In 1985, after three years of studies at the Paris Conservatory with Odile Pierre, he won first prize. Only one year later he won a first prize of excellence. During the same time he studied Analysis, Harmony, Counterpoint and Fugue with Yvonne Desportes and Marcel Bitsch and the improvisation with Pierre Cochereau. This course won him the gold medal of the Cziffra foundation.

== Career ==
At the age of nineteen he gave his first concert at the cathedral of Notre-Dame de Paris and since 1986 he has played in several festivals and became the youngest soloist of Radio-France. His passion for the music written by Marcel Dupré led him to a set of nine concerts featuring the composer's work.

He is often invited to play at prestigious festivals such as Villa Medicis Rome, Istanbul, Athenes, Berlin. Considered a brilliant organist by most conductors, he is often asked to be the soloist of the greatest European orchestras. He has appeared on television, and leads master classes based on the works of Marcel Dupré and Jeanne Demessieux. Matthes is organist of the great organ at Troyes Cathedral and he is at present professor of organ at the Conservatoire National Marcel Landowski at Troyes.

In 2007 he was awarded the distinction “Chevalier de l’Ordre des Arts et des Lettres” by the French Ministry of Culture.
