= Pierre Aubé =

French medievalist and author (born 1944)

Pierre Aubé (born 23 February 1944, Normandy) is a French medieval specialist and the author of a number of books. He was a professor of medieval history at the university of Rouen. He was married to organist and composer Odile Pierre.

== Works ==
- 1981: Baudouin IV de Jérusalem. Le roi lépreux.
- 1983: Les Empires normands d’Orient, XIe-XIIIe siècles.
- 1985: Godefroy de Bouillon, Fayard.
- 1988: Thomas Becket, Fayard.
- 1999: Jérusalem 1099, Actes Sud.
- 2001: Roger II de Sicile. Un Normand en Méditerranée, Payot.
- 2001: Éloge du mouton, Actes Sud.
- 2003: Saint Bernard de Clairvaux, Fayard.
- 2007: Un croisé contre Saladin. Renaud de Châtillon, Fayard.

In collaboration :

- 1996: Atlas de l’histoire de France, sous la direction de René Rémond, Perrin.
- 2000: Jérusalem. Le sacré et le politique, sous la direction d’Elias Sanbar et Farouk Mardam-Bey, Actes Sud.
