= Joachim Montagne =

French organist and composer

- Born: Joachim Louis-Paul Havard de la Montagne; 30 November 1927; Geneva
- Died: 1 October 2003 (aged 75); Geneva
- Citizenship: France; Switzerland
- Education: École César Franck
- Occupations: Composer organist choral director
- Years active: 1947-1996

Joachim Louis-Paul Havard de la Montagne (30 November 1927 – 1 October 2003) was a French composer, organist and choral director.

== Life ==
Joachim Havard de la Montagne was the son of French parents; Charles (born 1891) and Marie-Thérèse Eugénie (born 1899, née de Payret), who settled in his birthplace of Geneva, where his father worked for an international organisation. After World War II, he moved to Paris and studied music at the École César Franck. From 1947 to his retirement in 1996, he served religious music, notably in Paris at the churches of Sainte-Marie des Batignolles, Sainte-Odile and the liberal synagogue Copernic. Havard de la Montagne held the position of Kapellmeister at the église de la Madeleine in Paris, assisted by his wife Elisabeth, also and organist and harpsichordist. From 1971 to 1974, he founded and worked for the Choirs and the "Ensemble Instrumental de la Madeleine", with which he gave more than 300 concerts.

Montagne died in Geneva on 1 October 2003 aged 75, following a long illness.
