= Eugène Reuchsel =

French organist, pianist and composer

- Born: 21 July 1900; Lyon, France
- Died: 22 September 1988 (aged 88); Pollionnay
- Education: Conservatoire de Paris
- Occupations: Composer; Classical pianist; Classical organist
- Organizations: Concerts Colonne; Orchestre Lamoureux; Pasdeloup Orchestra
- Awards: Chevalier of the Légion d'honneur; Chevalier of the Order of the Black Star

Stéphane Marie-Eugène Reuchsel (21 July 1900 – 22 September 1988) was a French pianist, a specialist of Chopin and Liszt, organist and composer.

== Biography ==
Born in Lyon, a descendant of an illustrious family of musicians of German origin, he was Amédée Reuchsel's (1875–1931) son. He studied piano, organ and music composition at the Conservatoire de Paris, where he won the First prize. He won the First Prize in piano at the age of 16.

After completing his studies, he was engaged as a soloist in renowned orchestras of Paris: the Concerts Colonne, Orchestre Lamoureux, Pasdeloup Orchestra. Since then, he gave numerous recitals in Europe, America and North Africa, where marshal Lyautey gave him the best reception.

After the Second World War, Reuchsel continued his international tours: West Africa, Equatorial Africa, Madagascar, Reunion Islands and Mauritius, etc. At the same time, he performed in all the major Parisian theatres: Châtelet, Édouard VII, Mogador, Théâtre des Champs-Elysées, Erard, Gaveau, Pleyel, Palais de Chaillot during the "Grandes Nuits musicales", etc.

Between two tours, Reuchsel used to come to his villa "Croknotes", built in 1927 at Rayol by architect Édouard Mas. The house, close to the sea, opens widely on this last one. One of the peculiarities of the villa is that it has an organ in the living room, with a wind tunnel in the basement. There are also two concert pianos, one of which was given at the Town Hall of Rayol-Canadel. Reuchsel also trained students, such as composer Jean-Patrick André born in 1954.

Reuchsel died in 1988. He is buried in the Rayol-Canadel cemetery. On his tomb, a medallion recalls the motto of his life: "Music was our secret, our ideal, our joy of life."

== Distinctions ==
- Officier of the Légion d'honneur,
- Chevalier of the Order of the Black Star.

== Works ==
=== For piano ===
- 3 Bourrées, Paris, Billaudot.

=== For organ ===
- Promenades en Provence, (1938–1973), three collections, Lemoine
1. Vieux Noëls Provençaux (Nuit de Noël à Saint-Tropez)
2. Les Grandes Orgues de la Basilique de Saint-Maximin
3. Tambourinaires sur la place des Vieux Salins
4. Nuages ensoleillés sur le Cap Nègre
5. Le Cloître de Saint-Trophime à Arles
6. Petit Cimetière et Cyprès autour de la vieille église de Bormes-les-Mimosas
7. Voiles multicolores au port de Toulon
8. Les Cloches de Notre-Dame des Doms en Avignon
9. Jour de fête aux Saintes-Maries de la Mer
10. Profil de la Porte d’Orange à Carpentras
11. Le Moulin d’Alphonse Daudet à Fontvieille
12. La Chartreuse de Montrieux au crépuscule
13. Visions à l’Abbaye de Sénanque: La Foi en Dieu – La Joie en Dieu
- Évocation de Louis Vierne, (1979)
1. Lent et large: La rosace ensoleillée scintille de mille feux colorés au-dessus du Grand Orgue
2. Très lent et douloureux: Son âme d’artiste chante l’espoir de sa délivrance des ténèbres
3. Très lent: La lumière géniale luit dans ses yeux d’aveugle
- Huit Images de Provence, (1984), Universal
1. Assauts de vagues aux rochers de l’Ile de Port-Cros
2. Balancements des barcasses colorées au Vieux Port de Saint-Tropez
3. Hallucinante évocation des Moines aux ruines de la Chartreuse de la Verne
4. L’Étoile Radieuse de Moustiers Sainte-Marie
5. Humble petit oratoire à l’ombre d’oliviers séculaires
6. Coucher de Soleil sur les majestueuses Tours du Château de Lourmann
7. Douceur des Champs de Lavande fleurie
8. Coup de Mistral en Garrigue Provençale
- Six Pièces de Concert, en hommage à la mémoire d’Aristide Cavaillé-Coll (1985/86), Universal
1. Prélude en style fugué double
2. Intermède (Obsession d'un thème)
3. Quiétude et Espérance
4. Joies et Enthousiasmes
5. Recueillement et Béatitude
6. Final en style Toccata
- Bouquet de France (1986/87), Universal
1. Le pauvre Laboureur (version Bressanne)
2. Rossignolet du Bois joli (version Bressanne)
3. La Fille aux Oranges (version Niçoise)
4. Le Retour du Marin (version de l’Ouest)
5. Là-haut sur la Montagne (Pastourelle d’Alsace)
6. Douce Merveille (Noël Strasbourgeois de 1697)
7. Voici le joli Mois de Mai (version Dauphinoise)
8. Ma Mère m’envoie-t-au Marché (version de l’Ouest)
9. Berceuse (du pays d’Auvergne)
10. V’là la Saint-Martin (version Bressanne)
- La Vie du Christ: Évocations d’après l’Évangile de Saint Luc for Grand-Organ (1987) Universal, 2006
1. L’Annonciation (Luc 1, 31)
2. La Nativité (Luc 2, 6-7)
3. Le Baptême (Luc 3, 21-22)
4. La Prophétie accomplie (Luc 4, 20-21)
5. Les Béatitudes (Luc 6, 20)
6. La Pécheresse pardonnée (Luc 7, 47 et 50)
7. La Tempête apaisée (Luc 8, 24-25)
8. La Multiplication des Pains (Luc 9, 16-17)
9. La Transfiguration (Luc 9, 32 et 35)
10. La Parabole de la lumière (Luc 11, 33 et 36)
11. La Grâce de Dieu (Luc 17, 21)
12. Les Enfants jouent près de Jésus (Luc 18, 16-17)
13. L’Aveugle (Luc 18, 35-42)
14. L’Entrée à Jérusalem (Luc 19, 37-38)
15. La Cène (Luc 22, 19)
16. Le Crucifiement (Luc 23, 33)
17. La Résurrection (Luc 24, 5-6)
18. La Promenade à Emmaüs (Luc 24, 30-31)
19. L’Ascension (Luc 24, 50-51)
20. Le Crucifiement (Luc 23, 33)
21. La Résurrection (Luc 24, 5-6)
22. La Promenade à Emmaüs (Luc 24, 30-31)
23. L’Ascension (Luc 24, 50-51)

== Discography ==
- Éditions Lade Recordings of the main organ works of the Reuchsel family.
- France Orgue Discography established by Alain Cartayrade.
- Pro Organo Promenades en Provence complete, recorded at St Louis' Cathedral, St Louis, Missouri.
- Resonus Classics La Vie du Christ and Bouquet de France complete, recorded at St Giles' Cathedral, Edinburgh.

== Listening ==
- YouTube Pierre Labric plays 2 excerpts from the Promenades en Provence: 4. Nuages ensoleillés sur le Cap Nègre, and 3. Visions à l'abbaye de Sénanque (3rd part), on the Cavaillé-Coll organ of the Abbatiale Saint-Ouen of Rouen.
- YouTube Julien Girard joue La Chartreuse de Montrieux au crépuscule, No 12 of the Promenades en Provence, on the Casavant organ of the église Saint Pierre-Claver, Montréal.
- YouTube La Grâce de Dieu, from La Vie du Christ, by Fritz Anders on the St. Gabriel the Archangel Episcopal Church organ, Cherry Hills, Denver, Colorado.
