= Léo-Pol Morin =

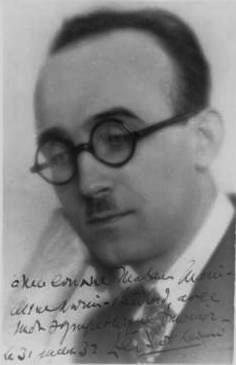
Léo-Pol Morin, 1932

Léo-Pol Morin (13 July 1892 – 29 May 1941) was a Canadian pianist, music critic, composer, and music educator. He composed under the name James Callihou, with his most well known works being Suite canadienne (1945) and Three Eskimos for piano. He also composed works based on Canadian and Inuit folklore/folk music and harmonized a number of French-Canadian folksongs. Victor Brault notably transcribed his Inuit folklore inspired Chants de sacrifice for choir and two pianos.

As a writer, Morin displayed a heavy interest in the music of Canada and the use of various folklore traditions within music composition. He wrote musical criticism for several Canadian publications and also published a book and a collection of essays. As a pianist, he played a major role in advocating music by French composers in his native country; notably performing the Canadian premieres of works by Claude Debussy, Gabriel Fauré, Darius Milhaud, Francis Poulenc, Maurice Ravel, Albert Roussel, and Erik Satie among others. He likewise was an exponent of works by Canadian composers in France, including pieces by François Brassard, Claude Champagne, Henri Gagnon, Émiliano Renaud, Léo Roy, and Georges-Émile Tanguay. Composer Rodolphe Mathieu notably dedicated two of his works to him: Trois Préludes (1921) and Sonata (1927).

== Early life and education: 1892–1914 ==
Born in Cap-Saint-Ignace, Quebec, Morin studied solfège, music dictation, and piano with Gustave Gagnon and the piano and organ with Gustave's son Henri Gagnon in Quebec City. He gave his first professional piano recital at the Club musical de Québec in 1909. In 1910 he relocated to Montreal where he studied harmony with Guillaume Couture and the piano with Arthur Letondal. In 1912 he was awarded the prestigious Prix d'Europe prize which enabled him to pursue further studies in Paris at the Conservatoire de Paris and with private instructors from 1912 to 1914.

While in Paris, Morin studied harmony, counterpoint, and fugue with Jules Mouquet and the piano under Isidor Philipp and Raoul Pugno. He gave his first Paris recital in late 1912 in the salon of the wife of poet Charles de Pomairols. On 29 May 1913 he attended the world premiere of Igor Stravinsky's famous ballet The Rite of Spring. In January 1914 Pugno died in the midst of their studies together, and the famed Spanish pianist Ricardo Viñes took his place as Morin's teacher. Pugno had previously performed the world premieres of several works by Ravel and Debussy, and he instilled in Morin a deep love for the works of these two composers.

== Early career in Quebec and Paris: 1914–1925 ==
With the outbreak of World War I in 1914, Morin returned to Canada where he remained for the next five years. Living in Montreal, he worked actively as a teacher and a concert pianist in Quebec province. In 1918 he co-founded the arts magazine Le Nigog with architect Fernand Préfontaine and writer Robert de Roquebrune.

Morin returned to Paris in 1919 after the conclusion of the war. Over the next six years he played an active role in the musical life of that city, collaborating with such notable artists as Alexis Roland-Manuel, Ravel, and Ricardo Viñes. During those years he returned periodically to Canada to visit family and perform in concerts, but spent the majority of his time in Paris. In 1920 he spent some months on a recital tour of England, Belgium, and the Netherlands for which proceeds went towards a monument raised in Debussy's hobour. He later returned to those countries in 1923 in a recital tour with Ravel. In 1926 the Conservatoire de Paris inducted him into the Comité d'honneur alongside Manuel de Falla, Paul Dukas, Arthur Honegger, José Iturbi, Yves Nat, Gabriel Pierné, Ravel, Albert Roussel, Arthur Rubinstein, and Heitor Villa-Lobos.

During the early 1920s Morin performed the Parisian premieres of several notable works, including Alban Berg's Piano Sonata in 1922. Composer Rodolphe Mathieu notably dedicated his Trois Préludes to him and he performed the work in its premiere at the Salle Pleyel in 1921. Paul Le Flem wrote the following in his review of a 15 January 1923 recital given by Morin at Paris's Salle Gaveau:

"Much praise is due the initiative of this intelligent musician who in a single evening was able to present so effectively music of such diversity. Evincing the subtlest grasp of idiom this artist passed easily from one composer's music to another's, finding the appropriate expression and the right emphasis for each one's thought. He brought to bear brilliant technical accomplishment as well, yet only to demonstrate how a vibrant touch and a sure instinct for sonority could remain submissive to the control of the spirit of the music."

== Later life and career: 1925–1941 ==
Morin moved from his home in Paris back to Montreal in the fall of 1925, where he quickly began advocating new French music through his concerts and writings; sometimes with protest from his peers. He began including his own works in his recitals in 1927, disguising them under the pseudonym James Callihou. With Victor Brault he put together the first festival in North America dedicated to the works of Debussy in December 1927. The festival notably included performances by mezzo-soprano Cédia Brault and the violinist Robert Imandt. For La Patrie critic Marcel Valois wrote in his review of Morin's recital at that festival:

"[Morin is] always the incomparable interpreter of Debussy, and all who heard, in Montreal or Paris, his performance of the Cathédrale engloutie, retain a keepsake of this beautiful work carved in memory."

In 1926 Morin was appointed secretary of the Montreal chapter of the Pro-Musica Society of New York and in 1928 he appeared alongside Ravel in concerts in Montreal. From 1926 to 1929 he was a music critic for La Patrie, and from 1929 to 1931 he taught on the faculty of the Conservatoire national in Montreal. He also contributed articles to other Canadian periodicals during the 1920s and early 1930s, including Canadian Forum, Vie canadienne, and Opinions Musicologist. Andrée Desautels wrote in The Canadian Encyclopedia, "Both his writings and his concerts showed Morin to be ahead of his time. [He was] a caustic spirit, an original, a personality compounded of intelligence and sensibility."

In 1931 Morin moved back to Paris where he spent most of his time up through the spring of 1936. In Paris he was active as a concert pianist, lecturer on music, and music critic for various periodicals. He returned to Montreal for a few months in 1933 during which time he performed a concert of contemporary French music at the Stella Theatre (now the Théâtre du Rideau Vert). He returned to the city again to perform Felix Mendelssohn's Capriccio brilliant in B minor for the inaugural performance of the Montreal Symphony Orchestra on 14 January 1935. In 1934 he gave a recital tour in the United States and in 1936 he gave recitals in Spain and Morocco.

Morin moved backed to Montreal in 1936 to join the faculty of the École de musique Vincent-d'Indy where he taught until his death in 1941 in an automobile accident in the Laurentians. He also served during that time as the music critic for Le Canada. His notable students included Paule-Aimée Bailly, François Brassard, Jean Papineau-Couture, and Alfred Mignault. He made one final trip to Europe in the summer of 1939 which was cut short by the outbreak of World War II. He performed in several concerts and gave lectures for the Canadian Broadcasting Corporation during the late 1930s; notably being a regular participant on the CBC Radio quiz show S.V.P.
