= Jules Mouquet =

French composer

- Pronunciation: [ʒyl mukɛ]
- Born: July 10, 1876
- Died: October 20, 1946 (aged 70)
- Occupation: composer

Jules Mouquet (French pronunciation: [ʒyl mukɛ], July 10, 1867 – October 25, 1946) was a French composer.

== Biography ==
Jules Mouquet studied at the Conservatoire de Paris with Théodore Dubois and Xavier Leroux. In 1896, he won the prestigious Prix de Rome with his cantata Mélusine. He went on to win another two composition prizes, the Prix Trémont (1905) and the Prix Chartier (1907). Mouquet became professor of harmony at the Conservatoire de Paris in 1913 and taught there for 14 years until his retirement in 1927. One of his notable students was Léo-Pol Morin.

== Works ==
Mouquet's main influences were the late Romantic and Impressionist composers. His best known work is probably his Sonata, Op. 15 La Flûte de Pan, composed in 1906, with versions for flute and orchestra, and flute and piano.
