= Aymé Kunc =

French composer (1877–1958)

Aymé Kunc (20 January 1877 – 13 February 1958) was a French composer and administrator.

== Career ==
Born in Toulouse, Kunc won second prize alongside Maurice Ravel in the Prix de Rome competition of 1902. Until 1907 he conducted the orchestra of the Théâtre Apollo in Paris. In 1914 he became the director of the Toulouse Conservatory, in which capacity he served for thirty years until 1944. He died in Toulouse aged 81.

Beginning in 1996, the Association Aymé Kunc has promoted the composer's music, and has recorded a number of his works, including the Messe de Sainte-Cécile.

== Selected works ==
=== Music for the stage ===
- Les Esclaves, opera (1911)
- Les Armes de Vulcain, ballet
- Les Dieux morts, ballet
- Pastorale antique, ballet

=== Orchestral works ===
- Ouverture de fête (1904-1907)
- Suite dramatique (1904-1907)
- Feuillets d'album
- Quatre Esquisses méditerranéennes (1949)
- Cloches d'Automne
- Prelude and final
- Fantaisie, for piano and orchestra (1904–07)
- Pensée musicale, for harp and orchestra (1916)
- Quatre Pièces, for flute and orchestra
- Pastorales, for violin and orchestra (1919)
- Légende, for viola and orchestra (1931)
- Poème, for cello and orchestra (1943)
- Nocturne, for horn and orchestra

=== Chamber music ===
- Sonata for Violin and Piano
- Fantaisie en forme de danse, for violin and piano
- Pastorale, for violin and piano
- Suite symphonique, for two cellos and piano
- Suite, for flute, cello and piano
- Trio, for violin, cello and piano
- Piano Quartet
- String Quartet No. 1 (1946)
- String Quartet No. 2 (1948)
- Pièces brèves, for string quartet
- Petite Suite, for wind quintet
- Wind Quintet (1954)
- Scherzetto, for wind quintet
- Asturiana, for wind quintet

=== Keyboard works ===
Piano music

- Scherzetto
- Simples chansons

Organ music

- Scherzetto
- Fantaisie symphonique

=== Vocal music ===
Cantatas

- Cantate pour le couronnement de Dante (1921)
- Hymne des ailes

Choral works (à cappella or with piano or small ensemble)

- Le Bohémien (with violin)
- Chanson pastorale (with piano)
- Deux Chants folkloriques
- Chants populaires languedociens
- Je ne veux plus chanter
- Noël de la libération
- Le Plus doux chant

Motets and sacred works

- Ave Maria I
- Ave Maria II
- Ave Maria III
- Ave verum I
- Ave verum II
- Messe de Sainte Cécile (1923)
- Psalm CXLVII

Songs with piano accompaniment

- Apaisement
- Je ne sais pas de fleur
- Printemps
- Soleil d'automne
- Le Voyage
