= Marcel Labey =

French conductor and composer

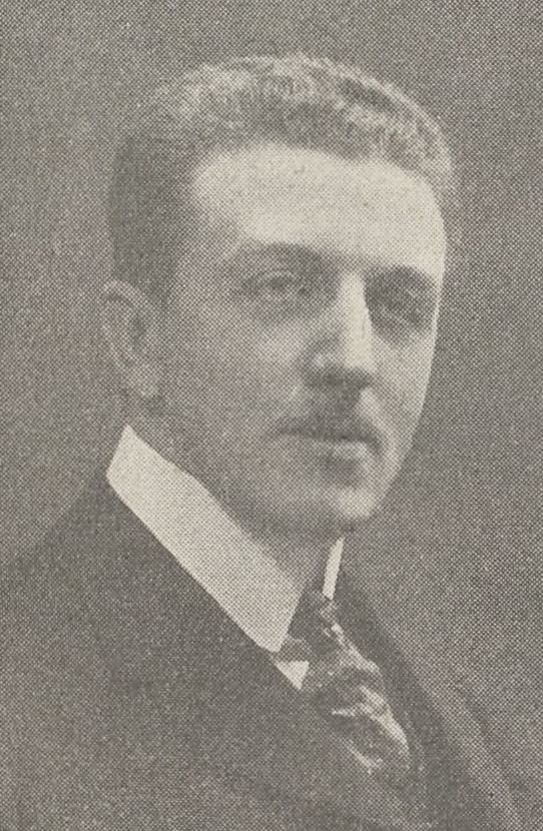
- Born: 6 August 1875; Le Vésinet, Île-de-France, France
- Died: 25 November 1968 (aged 93); Nancy, France
- Education: Schola Cantorum de Paris
- Occupations: Conductor; composer
- Spouse: Charlotte Sohy

Marcel Labey (6 August 1875, Vésinet – 25 November 1968, Nancy) was a French conductor and composer.

== Life ==
He was born to a family of magistrates and studied law in Paris (gaining his doctorate in 1898) before turning to music. He learned piano under Élie-Miriam Delaborde and Louis Breitner, and harmony under René Lenormand. He met Vincent d'Indy who made him follow his courses at the Schola Cantorum. The First World War interrupted his musical studies and career - he was wounded twice and mentioned in dispatches four times.

At the Schola Cantorum, he taught piano, composed piano sonatas, and (until the death of Vincent d'Indy) was one of its under-directors, and later became the co-founder and director of the Ecole César Franck (1935–1954). He was also secretary of France's Société nationale de musique.

His wife Charlotte Sohy (1887–1955), herself a student of d'Indy, composed a symphony, melodies, four string quartets and a lyric drama in 3 acts called L'Esclave Couronnée, which adapted a novel by Selma Lagerlöf and was put on at Mulhouse on 6 May 1947.

== Works ==
He rediscovered the "esprit franckiste" in his compositions.

=== Opera ===
Bérangère, liturgical drama in 3 acts (1911–1913; Le Havre, 12 April 1929)

=== Orchestral music ===
- Fantaisie (1900)
- 4 symphonies (1903 - 1908 - 1933 - 1940)
- Ouverture pour un drame (1920; Paris, 22 January 1921)
- Lied for cello and orchestra (1920)
- Suite champêtre (1922)
- Eglogue (1943)
- Triptyque symphonique (1947)
- Symphonietta for chamber orchestra (1950)
- Paysages marins (1952)
- Symphonie pour cordes (1954)
- Poème for piano and orchestra (1957)

=== Chamber and instrumental music ===
- Sonate pour piano (1900)
- sonates pour violon et piano (1901 - 1924 - 1951 - 1954)
- Sonate pour alto et piano, op.7 (1904)
- Quatuor avec piano (1911)
- Suite pour piano (1914)
- Quatuors à cordes (1919–1948)
- 2 Trios avec piano (1922–1937)
- Quintette avec piano (1929)
- Trio à cordes (1929)
- Sonate pour violoncelle et piano (1944)
- Sextuor à cordes (1959)
- des pièces pour piano et orgue
- des mélodies
- publication of adaptations for piano of several orchestral works by Vincent d'Indy :Symphonie en si bémol, Jour d'été à la montagne, etc.
