= Liesbeth Schlumberger =

South African organist

Liesbeth Schlumberger is an organist from South Africa, professor assistant of organ at the Conservatoire national supérieur musique et danse de Lyon since 1996.

== Biography ==
Schlumberger-Kurpershoek (1964) began her organ studies with Stephan Zondagh at the University of Pretoria before training in France in 1987 with Marie-Claire Alain for the organ and Huguette Dreyfus for the harpsichord at the conservatoire de Rueil-Malmaison. She then studied at the Conservatoire de Lille with Jean Boyer and also followed improvisation classes with Jean Langlais.

In 1996, she was appointed assistant in the teaching staff of the department of keyboards, organ section of the conservatoire national supérieur musique et danse de Lyon then directed by Jean Boyer and more recently by François Espinasse.

Since 1994, Schlumberger has been the holder of the organ of the Église protestante unie de l'Étoile in Paris.

She participates in several international competitions, as a participant or as a member of the jury, notably in 2010, in Chartres.

== Distinctions ==
- 1985: First prize of the national radio competition of South Africa
- 1989: First prize at the Bordeaux International Organ Competition
