= Albert Bertelin =

French composer (1872–1951)

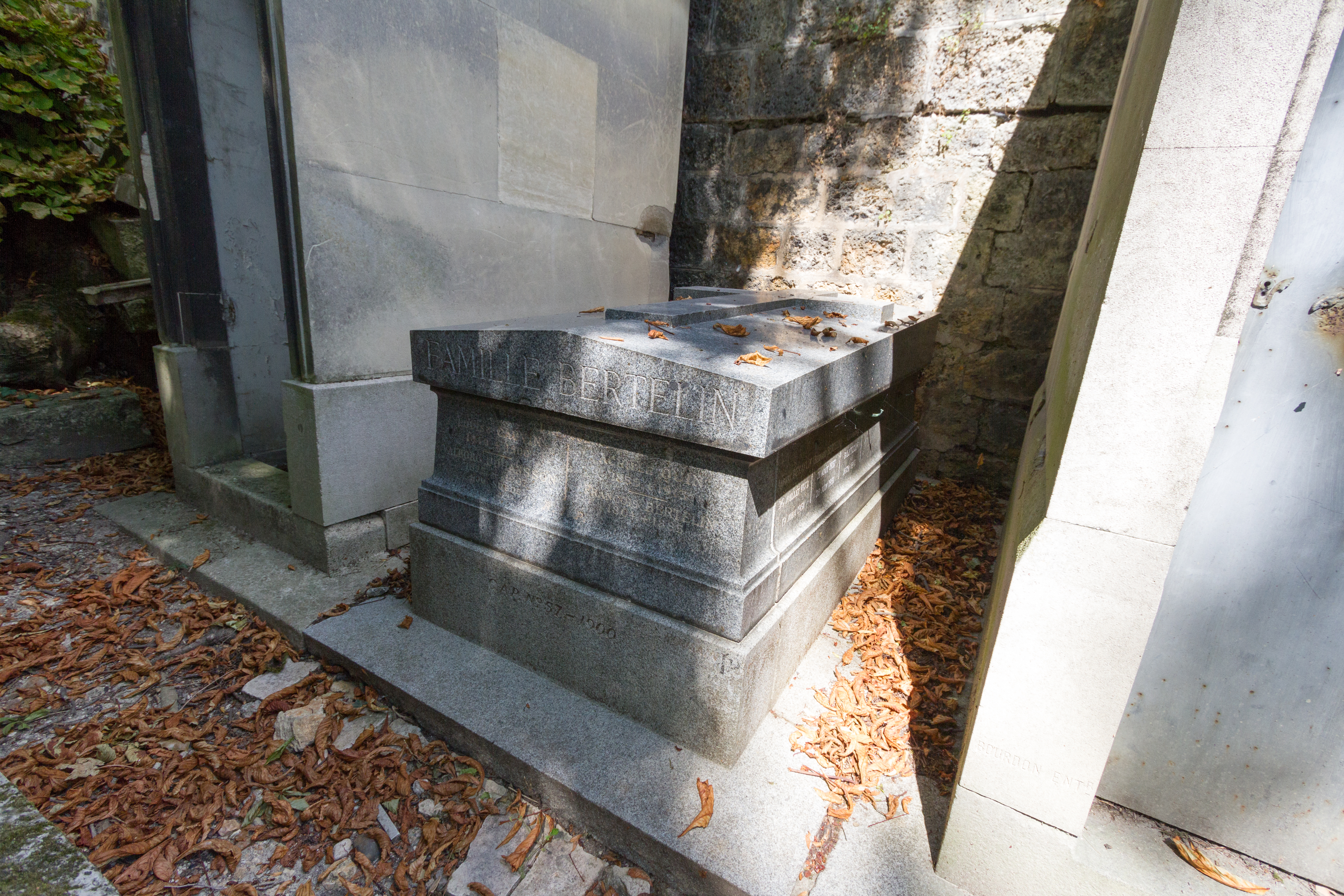
Grave at Père Lachaise Cemetery

Albert Bertelin (26 July 1872 – 19 July 1951) was a French composer.

== Life ==
Born in Paris, Bertelin studied at the Conservatoire de Paris where he was a pupil of Théodore Dubois, Raoul Pugno, Charles-Marie Widor and Jules Massenet. In 1902 he received a 2nd prize for composition at the Prix de Rome, alongside Aymé Kunc and Jean Roger-Ducasse. He then taught counterpoint and fugue at the École César Franck.

Bertelin composed one symphony, one opera, two Oratorios, one Mass, motets, a cello, a violin and a piano concerto and chamber music works. He also published music reviews and several musicological works and was a member of the examination jury of the Conservatoire de Paris.

Bertelin died in Paris in 1951 and was buried at Père Lachaise Cemetery (31st division).

== Works ==
- Goïtza, Opera
- Légende de Loreley for Choir and Orchestra
- Choral for Orchestra, 1902
- Sub umbra Crucis, Oratorio, 1917
- In nativitate Domini, Oratorio, 1922
- Sonate en mi mineur for cello and piano, 1933
- Sonate for violin and piano, 1937

== Publications ==
- Traité de composition musicale, 4 volumes, 1931–34
- Traité de contrepoint modal et tonal, 1951
- Les Bases de l’harmonie
