= Philippe Beaussant =

French musicologist and novelist

- Born: 6 May 1930; Bordeaux, France
- Died: 8 May 2016 (aged 86); Paris, France
- Occupations: Musicologist, novelist
- Known for: Member of the Académie française

Philippe Beaussant (6 May 1930 – 8 May 2016) was a French musicologist and novelist, an expert on French baroque music, on which he has published widely. He was the founder of the Centre de Musique Baroque de Versailles, of which he was the artistic adviser from 1987 to 1996. He has also been a producer of musical programs for Radio France since 1974. His biography of Jean-Baptiste Lully, Lully ou le musicien du soleil (Éditions Gallimard, 1992), was the basis of the film Le Roi Danse (2000).

Beaussant won the 1993 Grand Prix du roman de l'Académie française for his novel Héloïse.

He was elected to seat 36 of the Académie française on 15 November 2007.
