= Centre de Musique Baroque de Versailles =

Research center in Versailles, France

Coordinates: 48.8005°N 2.1338°E

The Centre de Musique Baroque de Versailles (CMBV - Centre of Baroque Music Versailles) is a centre for the study and performance of French Baroque music, based at the Menus-Plaisirs du Roi. It was founded by Philippe Beaussant and Vincent Berthier de Lioncourt, who were entrusted with the task of founding a musical establishment at Versailles by the French Ministry of Culture in 1987. It opened in 1988 (with Beaussant as its first artistic advisor and de Lioncourt its first director), and an adult choir and children's choir (Les Chantres and Les Pages respectively) were added in the following two years. It has since 1996 been based in the Hôtel des Menus-Plaisirs at the Palace.
