= Jeanne Demessieux =

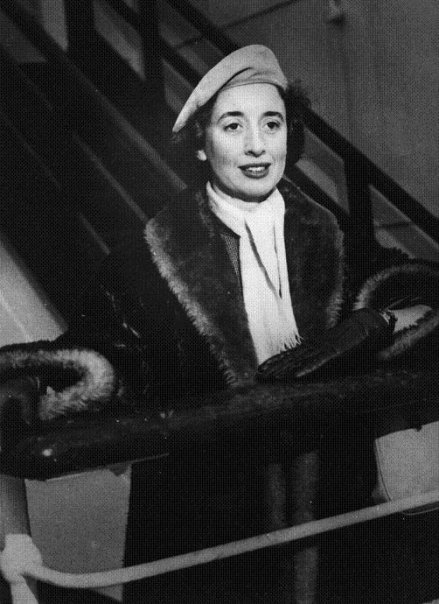

Background information
- Born: Jeanne Marie-Madeleine Demessieux; 14 February 1921; Montpellier, Herault, France
- Died: 11 November 1968 (aged 47) 12th arrondissement, Paris, France
- Occupations: Musician, composer, teacher
- Instruments: Piano, organ

Jeanne Marie-Madeleine Demessieux (14 February 1921 – 11 November 1968) was a French organist, pianist, composer, and teacher. She was titular organist at Saint-Esprit for 29 years and at La Madeleine in Paris starting in 1962. She performed internationally as a concert organist and was the first female organist to sign a record contract. She went on to record many organ works, including her own compositions.

== Biography ==
Born in Montpellier (Hérault), Jeanne Demessieux was the second child of Marie-Madeleine Demessieux (née Mézy) and Étienne Demessieux. After taking private piano lessons with her elder sister, Yolande, Jeanne entered the Montpellier Conservatoire in 1928. Four years later, she obtained first prizes in solfège and piano. In 1933, she began her studies at the Paris Conservatoire; studying piano with Simon Riera and Magda Tagliaferro, harmony with Jean Gallon, counterpoint and fugue with Noël Gallon, and composition with Henri Büsser. The same year, she was appointed titular organist at Saint-Esprit, a post she held for 19 years.

From 1936 to 1939, Demessieux studied organ privately with Marcel Dupré, whose organ class at the Conservatoire she joined in 1939. After receiving first prizes in harmony, piano, fugue and counterpoint organ by 1941, Demessieux studied privately with Dupré for five more years, before she played her début concert at the Salle Pleyel in Paris in 1946, as part of a series of 12 solo concerts between 1946 and 1948. This was the beginning of her career as an international concert organist and improviser, but also coinciding with Dupré irrevocably turning his back on Demessieux, triggered by intrigues within the Paris organ world. According to Pierre Labric, Jeanne Demessieux was not responsible for this rift.

In 1947, she became the first female organist to sign a record contract, with a performance of Toccata and Fugue in D minor, BWV 565 for Decca Records. She gave more than 700 concerts in France, the United Kingdom, Belgium, the Netherlands, Switzerland, Germany, and the United States (1953, 1955, and 1958). Demessieux always performed from memory, having an active repertoire of more than 2,500 compositions, including the complete organ works of Bach, Franck, the major organ works of Liszt and Mendelssohn, and all of Dupré's organ works up to Opus 41. A prolific recording artist, she was awarded the Grand Prix du Disque Award in 1961 for her complete recording of Franck's organ works (1959, a world premiere recording).

In 1962, Demessieux was appointed as titular organist at La Madeleine in Paris. She combined this with demanding academic duties, serving as professor of organ and improvisation at the Nancy Conservatoire (1950–1952) and the Conservatoire Royal in Liège (1952–1968). Among her students were Marie-Madeleine Duruflé, Pierre Labric, and Louis Thiry. In 1967, after several years of negotiations, she signed a contract with Decca Records for a recording of the complete organ works by Olivier Messiaen at Notre-Dame de Paris, with which she could not comply to for health reasons. According to her biographer, Christiane Trieu-Colleney, Demessieux underwent medical treatment and did not perform in concert for most of the last year of her life. Jeanne Demessieux died on 11 November 1968 in Paris, at age 47, from an embolism as a result from late-diagnosed lung cancer. She was buried in the Demessieux family tomb in the Cimetière du Grau-du-Roi, not far from Aigues-Mortes.

Demessieux wrote more than 30 compositions. A third of these were written for the organ, but she also produced pieces for piano, numerous songs, a handful of choral works (including an oratorio, La Chanson de Roland), and orchestral works. About half of her output has been published as of 2021. In 2021, Decca Records released an 8-CD box set with her complete recordings for this label between 1947 and 1967, including the above-mentioned 1959 world-premiere recording of Franck's complete organ works.

== Compositions ==
=== Organ solo ===
- Nativité, op. 4 (Composed in 1943/44. Sampzon: Delatour France, 2005).
- Six Études, op. 5 (Composed in 1944. Paris: Bornemann/Leduc, 1946).
  - Pointes
  - Tierces
  - Sixtes
  - Accords alternés
  - Notes répétées
  - Octaves
- Sept Méditations sur le Saint-Esprit, op. 6 (Composed in 1945–47. Paris: Durand, 1947).
  - Veni Sancte Spiritus
  - Les Eaux
  - Pentecôte
  - Dogme
  - Consolateur
  - Paix
  - Lumière
- Triptyque, op. 7 (Composed in 1947. Paris: Durand, 1949).
  - Prélude
  - Adagio
  - Fugue
- Twelve Choral-Preludes on Gregorian Chant Themes, op. 8 (Composed in 1947. Boston, MA: McLaughlin & Reilly, 1950, reissued by Summy-Birchard in 1995).
  - Rorate Caeli (aka. Rorate Coeli)
  - Adeste Fideles
  - Attende Domine
  - Stabat Mater
  - Vexilla Regis
  - Hosanna filio David
  - O Filii
  - Veni Creator Spiritus
  - Ubi caritas
  - In manus tuas
  - Tu es Petrus
  - Domine Jesu
- Andante (Chant donné) (Composed in 1953. In: 64 Leçons d'Harmonie, offertes en hommage à Jean Gallon, edited by Claude Delvincourt. Paris: Durand, 1953).
- Te Deum, op. 11 (Composed in 1957/58. Paris: Durand, 1959).
- Répons pour le temps de pâques: Victimae paschali laudes (Composed in 1962/63. Paris: Durand, 1970).
- Répons pour les temps liturgiques (Composed in 1962–66. Sampzon: Delatour France, 2006).
  - Répons pour le temps du Très-Saint-Rosaire: Ave Maria.
  - Répons pour le temps d'Advent: Consolamini.
  - Répons pour le temps du Saint-Sacrement: Lauda Sion (First version, composed in 1963).
  - Répons pour le temps du Saint-Sacrement: Lauda Sion (Second version, composed in 1966).
- Prélude et fugue en ut, op. 13 (Composed in 1964. Paris: Durand, 1965).

=== Organ and orchestra ===
- Poème, op. 9 (Composed in 1949. Paris: Durand, 1952).

=== Piano solo ===
- 7 Pièces inédites (Sampzon: Delatour France, 2011).
  - Le Chant des petits oiseaux
  - Berceuse et impromptu
  - Romance sans paroles
  - Allegro
  - Mazurka
  - Valse n° 1
  - Murmure des bois
- Berceuse (Composed in 1926. Unpublished).
- Suite (Composed in 1938. Unpublished).
  - Prélude
  - Scherzetto
  - Menuet
  - Toccata
- Étude in F♯ major (Composed in 1938. Unpublished).
- Trois préludes (Composed in 1939. Unpublished).
  - D# minor
  - B minor
  - D minor

=== Songs (with piano) ===
- Le Moulin (Composed in 1937. Unpublished).
- Soudainement contre les Vitres (Composed in 1940. Unpublished).
- Sonnet de Michel-Ange (Composed in 1949. Unpublished.)
- Action de grâce (No date. Unpublished).
- Cavalier (No date. Unpublished).
- Le Vase brisé (No date. Unpublished).

=== Chamber music ===
- Sonata for violin and piano (Composed in 1940. Sampson: Delatour France, 2013).
  - Allegro moderato
  - Adagio cantabile
  - Thème et variations
- Ballade, op. 12, for horn and piano (Composed in 1962. Paris: Durand, 1962).
- String quartet (No date. Unpublished).

=== Vocal music ===
- Cantate pour le jeudi Saint for chorus, soloists, and organ; text by Félix Raugel (Composed in 1938. Unpublished).
- Barques célestes for three women's voices a capella (Composed in 1938. Unpublished).
- Consolamini for five mixed voices a capella (Composed in 1950. Unpublished).
- La Chanson de Roland, op. 10, oratorio for chorus, mezzo-soprano, and orchestra (Composed in 1951–56. Paris: Leduc, 2000).

=== Miscellaneous ===
- Two symphonic movements for orchestra (Composed in 1941. Unpublished).
- George Frideric Handel: Cadenzas for Organ Concertos Nos. 1 and 2 (Unpublished).
- Franz Liszt: Funérailles, arranged for organ solo (Sampzon: Delatour France, 2010).

== Discography ==
- Jeanne Demessieux: L'oeuvre pour orgue.
  - Te Deum op. 11, Répons pour le temps de Pâques, 12 Choral-Préludes op. 8, Triptyque op. 7, Prélude et Fugue en Ut op. 13, Sept Méditations sur le Saint-Esprit op. 6, Six Etudes op. 5. Pierre Labric: Hommage à Jeanne Demessieux.
    - Pierre Labric, Organist. Recorded in July 1971 (Te Deum), December 1971 (Choral-Preludes, Répons), October 1972 (Méditations, Études), November 1972 (Triptyque, Prélude et Fugue) and April 1974 (Hommage) at St. Ouen, Rouen, and St. Pierre, Angoulème (Six Études, Sept Méditations). Sigean: Solstice, 2017. 2 CD's.
- Jeanne Demessieux: The Decca Legacy.
  - Her complete recordings for Decca Records between 1947 and 1967.
    - Jeanne Demessieux, Organist. London: Decca Records, 2021. 8 CD's.
- Jeanne Demessieux: Pièces pour orgue.
  - Six Etudes op. 5, Méditations sur le Saint-Esprit op. 6 (Nos. 2 & 7), Triptyque op. 7, Attende Domine (Choral-Preludes op. 8), Te Deum op. 11. Pierre Labric: Hommage à Jeanne Demessieux (first movement).
    - Pierre Labric, Organist. Recorded in 1969 and 1972 at Notre-Dame de Paris. Sigean: Solstice, 2010. 1 CD.
- Jeanne Demessieux: Complete Organ Works.
  - Nativité op. 4, Six Études op. 5, Sept Méditations sur le Saint-Esprit op. 6, Triptyque op. 7, 12 Choral-Préludes op. 8, Te Deum op. 11, Répons pour les Temps Liturgiques, Prélude et Fugue en Ut op. 13.
    - Maxime Patel, Organist. Recorded in August 2006 at the Jann Organs of the Stiftsbasilika Waldsassen, Germany. A film production by Federico Savio. Hombourg-Haut, France: Fugatto, 2008. 1 DVD.
- Jeanne Demessieux: Complete Organ Works.
  - Nativité op. 4, Six Études op. 5, Sept Méditations sur le Saint-Esprit op. 6, Triptyque op. 7, 12 Choral-Préludes op. 8, Te Deum op. 11, Répons pour les Temps Liturgiques, Prélude et Fugue en Ut op. 13, Andante (Chant donné), Poème op. 9 for organ and orchestra.
    - Stephen Tharp, Organist. Recorded in June 2004 at St. Martin, Dudelange (Luxembourg; opp. 4, 5, 8, 11, 13, and Andante), and in May 2006 at St. Ouen, Rouen (opp. 6 and 7, Répons pour les Temps Liturgiques). Jeanne Demessieux, Organist/Orchestre Radio-Symphonique de Paris, direction: Eugène Bigot (Poème op. 9). Recorded in 1952 at Salle Pleyel, Paris. Korschenbroich, Germany: Aeolus Music, 2008. 2 SACD's & 1 CD.
- César Franck: The complete works for organ.
  - Jeanne Demessieux, Organ. Recorded in July 1959 at the Cavaillé-Coll-Orgel of La Madeleine in Paris, France. Amersfoort, Netherlands: Festivo, n. d. FECD 155/156. 2 CD's.
- Jeanne Demessieux aux grandes orgues de l'Eglise de la Madeleine à Paris, Vol. I.
  - J. S. Bach: Sinfonia from Cantata No. 29, Erbarm dich mein, o Herre Gott BWV 721, O Mensch, bewein dein Sünde groß BWV 622, Christ unser Herr zum Jordan kam BWV 684; W. A. Mozart: Fantasia in F minor K. 608; F. Liszt: Prelude and Fugue on the name BACH; Ch. M. Widor: Allegro from Symphony No. 6 in G minor.
    - Jeanne Demessieux, Organ. Recorded in July 1958 at the Cavaillé-Coll-Orgel of La Madeleine in Paris, France. Amersfoort, Netherlands: Festivo, n. d. FECD 131. 1 CD.
- Jeanne Demessieux aux grandes orgues de l'Eglise de la Madeleine à Paris, Vol. II.
  - J. S. Bach: Toccata and Fugue in F Major BWV 540, Fantasia in G major BWV 572; W. A. Mozart: Adagio and Fugue in C minor K. 546/426; E. Mignan: Toccata Médiévale; J. Berveiller: Mouvement; J. Demessieux: Te Deum op. 11.
    - Jeanne Demessieux, Organ. Recorded in July 1958 at the Cavaillé-Coll-Orgel of La Madeleine in Paris, France. Amersfoort, Netherlands: Festivo, n. d. FECD 132. 1 CD.
- The Legendary Jeanne Demessieux, Vol. III.
  - O. Messiaen: Transports de joie (L'Ascension); J. S. Bach: Liebster Jesu, wir sind hier BWV 731; J. Berveiller: Mouvement; Ch. M. Widor: Toccata from Symphony No. 5 in F minor; W. A. Mozart: Fantasia in F minor K. 608; J. S. Bach: Toccata, Adagio and Fugue in C major BWV 564; F. Liszt: Ad nos, ad salutarem undam.
    - Jeanne Demessieux, Organ. Recorded on 6 July 1961 at the Müller-Orgel of St. Bavo, Haarlem (Mozart), on 23 July 1963 at the organ of the Oude Kerk in Amsterdam (Bach: BWV 564), at Victoria Hall in Geneva (1963; Liszt: Ad nos), and the Metropolitan Cathedral in Liverpool (1967; Messiaen; Bach: BWV 731; Berveiller and Widor). Amersfoort, Netherlands: Festivo, n. d. FECD 141. 1 CD.
- The Legendary Jeanne Demessieux: The Hamburg Organs.
  - St. Sophienkirche: H. Purcell: Trumpet Tune; J. S. Bach: Praeludium and Fugue in A minor BWV 543, Liebster Jesu, wir sind hier BWV 731. St. Michaelis: C. Franck: Prélude, Fugue et Variation op. 18, Cantabile (Trios Pièces). Christianskirche: J. Berveiller: Mouvement; J. Demessieux: Te Deum op. 11, Consolateur (Sept Méditation sur le Saint Esprit op. 6), Tierces (Six Études op. 5); O. Messiaen: Dieu parmi nous (La Nativité du Seigneur); J. Demessieux: Improvisation on the Choral "O großer Gott der Treu" from Cantata No. 46 of J. S. Bach.
    - Jeanne Demessieux, Organ. Recorded in May 1959 (St. Sophienkirche), in November 1962 (St. Michaelis), and June 1958 (Christianskirche). Amersfoort, Netherlands: Festivo, n. d. FECD 6961/862. 1 CD.
- Jeanne Demessieux: Complete Organ Works.
  - Te Deum op. 11, Répons pour le temps de Pâques, 12 Choral-Préludes op. 8, Triptyque op. 7, Prélude et Fugue en Ut op. 13, Sept Méditations sur le Saint-Esprit op. 6, Six Etudes op. 5. Pierre Labric: Hommage à Jeanne Demessieux.
    - Pierre Labric, Organist. Recorded in July and December 1971 and October 1972 at St. Ouen, Rouen, and St. Pierre, Angoulème (Six Études, Sept Méditations). Musical Heritage Society, 1974.

== Bibliography ==
- Aprahamian, Felix. Jeanne Demessieux. In Felix Aprahamian (ed.): Diaries and selected writings on music. Woodbridge, Suffolk: The Boydell Press, 2015, 375–376.
- Association des Amis de l'Orgue (ed.). Jeanne Demessieux: Journal (1934–1946). L'Orgue 287–288 (2009).
- Association Maurice et Marie-Madeleine Duruflé (ed.). Hommage à Jeanne Demessieux. Bulletin no. 9 (2009).
- Ballesteros, Domitila. Jeanne Demessieux's 'Six Etudes' and the piano technique. Rio de Janeiro, Brazil (2004).
- Cavanagh, Lynn (2004). "Organ Performance as a Trade Commodity of France: The Shaping of Concert Organist Jeanne Demessieux" (PDF). Context: Journal of Music Research (27/28): 5–30.
- Cavanagh, Lynn. The rise and fall of a famous collaboration: Marcel Dupré and Jeanne Demessieux. The Diapason (July 2005): 18–21.
- Chevalier, Éliane. Marie-Madeleine Chevalier-Duruflé et Marcel Dupré. In Association Maurice et Marie-Madeleine Duruflé (ed.): Marie-Madeleine Chevalier-Duruflé. Bulletin no. 17 (2019–2020), 39–41.
- Colleney, Christiane. In memoriam Jeanne Demessieux (1921–1968). Vingtième anniversaire. Jeunesse et Orgue 70 (1988): 9–10.
- Demessieux, Jeanne. Journal (1934–1946). L'Orgue: Bulletin des Amis de l'Orgue 287–288 (2009): 64–247.
- Denis, Pierre. Les organistes français d'aujourd'hui: Jeanne Demessieux, organiste du Saint-Esprit, professeur du Conservatoire Royal de Liège. L'Orgue 75 (April/June 1955): 37–44.
- Ellis, Laura. The American recital tours of Jeanne Demessieux. The Diapason 86 (October 1995): 14–18.
- Haiawi, Maryam. Das Orgelwerk von Jeanne Demessieux (1921–1968). Musica sacra 135, no. 6 (2015): 328–330.
- Haiawi, Maryam. Die Sept Méditations sur le Saint-Esprit von Jeanne Demessieux (1921–1968): Kompositionsstil und theologischer Gehalt. Ars Organi 65, no. 2, (June 2017): 90–96.
- Labric, Pierre. Jeanne Demessieux (1921–1968): Pariser Orgellegende von La Madeleine. Organ – Journal für die Orgel 2, no. 2 (1999): 36–38.
- Labric, Pierre. Jeanne Demessieux: Présentation des œuvres pour orgue. In Association Maurice et Marie-Madeleine Duruflé (ed.): Hommage à Jeanne Demessieux. Bulletin no. 9 (2009), 70–75.
- Labric, Pierre. Jeanne Demessieux: Analyse de l'œuvre pour orgue. In Association Maurice et Marie-Madeleine Duruflé (ed.): Hommage à Jeanne Demessieux. Bulletin no. 9 (2009), 76–96.
- Machart, Renaud. Jeanne Demessieux (1921–1968). In Renaud Machart and Vincent Warnier (ed.): Les grands organistes du XXe siècle. Paris: Buchet-Chastel, 2018, 157–164.
- Marchais, Christine. Jeanne Demessieux. In Association Femmes et Musique (ed.): Compositrices Françaises au XXème siècle, vol. 2. Sampzon: Delatour France, 2014, 65–66.
- Page, Barnaby. Jeanne Demessieux. Organists' Review (September 2018): 9–13.
- Steed, Graham. Dupre and Demessieux: The master and the pupil. The American Organist 13 (March 1979): 36–37.
- Tréfouel, Dominique. Jeanne Demessieux. Lyon, France: J2C/ALDRUI Éditions, 2005. ISBN 2-906196-14-2.
- Trieu-Colleney, Christiane. Jeanne Demessieux: Une vie de luttes et de gloire. Avignon, France: Les Presses Universelles, 1977.
- D'Arcy Trinkwon. The legend of Jeanne Demessieux: a study. The Diapason (November 2008): 30–33.
- Welzel, Martin. Jeanne Demessieux (1921–1968): A critical examination of her life. DMA Dissertation, University of Washington, Seattle, 2005. ResearchGate
