= Guy de Lioncourt =

French composer (1885–1961)

Guy de Lioncourt (1 December 1885 in Caen – 24 or 25 December 1961 in Paris) was a French composer.

== Life ==
He studied music at the Schola Cantorum de Paris under Léon de Saint-Réquier (harmony), Amédée Gastoué (Gregorian chant), André Roussel (counterpoint), Vincent d'Indy (composition), Charles Pineau (organ), F. Mondain (woodwind) and Louis de Serres (singing).

On 2 July 1912, at Boffres (Ardèche), he married Claire de Pampelonne, niece of Vincent d'Indy. They had five children: Colette, Jeanne, Vincent (died in childhood), Thérèse and Germaine (future wife of composer Jacques Berthier (1923-1994) - among their children was Vincent Berthier de Lioncourt).

In 1918, he won the Grand Prix Lasserre with the opéra féerique La Belle au bois dormant (1912-1915). After having been the secretary general of the Schola Cantorum de Paris, he became its professor of counterpoint in 1914. Guy de Lioncourt played a major role in the foundation of the École César Franck, acting as its under director, then director in 1942, all the while teaching the composition class. His counterpoint (1914–1931) and composition (1932–1934) classes at the Schola Cantorum were formative for a multitude of famous students, as did his classes in musical composition (1935–1955) and of "déclamation lyrique" (1942–1954) at the École César Franck.

On the death of Vincent d'Indy, he occupied the post of sous-directeur and taught composition.

== His work ==
His work is almost entirely religious in inspiration, though he has also written symphonic and chamber music pieces. His motets à 4 voix, his 21 Cantiques pour les principales circonstances de la vie liturgique, his Élévations Liturgiques, and his Dix préludes à l'introït place him in the first rank of church musicians.

Besides la Belle au Bois Dormant which has already been mentioned, he wrote the conte lyrique Hyalis, le petit faune aux yeux bleus, pour soli chœurs et orchestre, a Jean de la Lune.

Three works are especially notable:

- le Mystère d'Emmanuel, written at Liège in 1924 (liturgical drama in 2 parts),
- les Dix Lépreux,
- le Mystère de l'Alleluia (finding a balance between plainchant and polyphony, with Latin and French texts).

In 1935, he founded the École César Franck with Louis de Serres, becoming its director in 1942. He gathered his memoirs in the work Un Témoignage sur la musique et sur la vie au XXe siecle. He also completed the fourth and last volume of d'Indy's Cours de composition.
