= Michel Chapuis (organist) =

French classical organist and pedagogue

Michel Léon Chapuis (French pronunciation: [miʃɛl ʃapɥi]) (15 January 1930 – 12 November 2017) was a French classical organist and pedagogue. He was especially known as an interpreter of the French and the German Baroque masters and dedicated to historically informed performances.

== Biography ==
Chapuis was born in Dole, Jura, and had his early training there, on the organ of the Cathedral of Dole. In 1943, he studied the piano with Émile Poillot in Dijon. In 1945 came his first serious study of the organ with Jeanne Marguillard, organist of the Besançon Cathedral. He then studied at the École César Franck in Paris under René Mahlherbe (composition) and Édouard Souberbielle (organ). He had further studies with Marcel Dupré at the Conservatoire de Paris and won prizes in organ and improvisation in 1951 (the Prix Périlhou et Guilmant).

Chapuis was organist for the Paris churches of St Germain l'Auxerrois 1951-54 and St Nicolas des Champs 1954-1972, accompanied at Notre-Dame de Paris 1955-1964, and was titular organist of St Séverin from 1964. He also toured widely as a concert artist.

From 1956-1979 he was Professor at the Conservatoire de Strasbourg, 1979-1986 at the Besançon Conservatoire, and 1986-1995 at the Paris Conservatoire. From 1996-2010, he was organist at the Versailles Royal Chapel.

During his lifetime, he performed every surviving piece of French organ music from the 17th and 18th centuries on the Clicquot organ of St Nicolas des Champs.

He also produced numerous recordings matching early repertoire to historic instruments. His important recordings included the complete organ works of Johann Sebastian Bach (1966), considered by many as one of the best recordings of this oeuvre.

Chapuis died in Dole in 2017, aged 87.

== Recordings ==
- 1963 : Messe à 8 voix et 8 Instruments H.3 de Marc-Antoine Charpentier, Michel Chapuis, organ, conducted by Trajan Popesco. LP A. Charlin.
- 1966 - 1970 : Johan Sébastian Bach, complete works for organ. 14 CD United archives.
- 1988: Du Mage, Clerembault: Premier Livre d'Orgue (Orgue Francois-Henri Clicquot de la Cathedral de Poitiers). Astrée.
- 1997 : Messe pour le Port-Royal H.5 de Marc-Antoine Charpentier, Michel Chapuis, historical organ Louis-Alexandre Cliquot (Houdan 1735), Les Demoiselles de Saint-Cyr, conducted by Emmanuel Mandrin. CD Auvidis Astrée & Naïve 2007.
- 2002 : Messe de Monsieur Mauroy H.6 de Marc-Antoine Charpentier, Michel Chapuis, great organ, Le Concert Spirituel, conducted by Hervé Niquet. CD Glossa.

== Sources ==
- Bach Cantatas
