= École César Franck =

Music school in Paris, France

The École César-Franck (César Franck School, named after César Franck) was a music school founded in Paris in January 1935 by Guy de Lioncourt, Louis de Serres, Pierre de Bréville and Marcel Labey. It was produced by a split from the Schola Cantorum following a disagreement over the artistic testament of Vincent d'Indy.

== History ==
This comment by Joseph Canteloube, in his book Vincent d’Indy, reports the incident :

In his artistic testament, d'Indy had designated the directors that he wished to see at the head of the Schola after his death. Granting the master's wishes, the board of directors named these people directors. But for certain reasons, of no interest here, the actions of the Schola were taken back in order to form a majority to reverse the board of directors. This was done on December 8, 1931. The new counsel revoked the directors that Indy had designated. Seeing this, the artistic counsel (Gabriel Pierné, Paul Dukas, Guy Ropartz, Albert Roussel, and Pierre de Bréville, resigned. Of the 54 professors, 49 also resigned, as did 220 out of 250 students. The students of Vincent d'Indy, dispossessed from the Schola, founded the César Franck School, that opened its doors on January 7, 1935 under the direction of Louis de Serres, assisted by Guy de Lioncourt and Marcel Labey.

In fact, the École César-Franck opened its doors at first at the home of M. de Froberville, at number 240, boulevard Raspail. On 9 March it then re-installed itself at number 16, boulevard Edgar-Quinet and, from 1941, at number 3, rue Jules-Chaplain, in the 6th arrondissement of Paris (not far from the rue Stanislas where the first Schola had begun), and finally at number 8, rue Gît-le-Cœur, from 1968. The establishment closed its doors at the end of the 1980s, after the departure of Charles Brown, its last director.

The title of Schola Cantorum is retained by the school on rue Saint-Jacques.

== Role ==
Guy de Lioncourt played a major role in the foundation of the César Franck School, acting as its under director, then director in 1942, all the while teaching the composition class. His counterpoint (1914–1931) and music composition (1932–1934) classes at the Schola Cantorum de Paris were formative for a multitude of famous students, as did his classes in composition (1935–1955) and of "déclamation lyrique" (1942–1954) at the César Franck School.

This school trained a large number of talented musicians, among which were Charles Brown, René Benedetti, Jean Pagot, Jeanne Joulain, Éliane Lejeune-Bonnier, Antoinette Labye, Michel and Denise Chapuis, Élisabeth and Joachim Havard de la Montagne, Paule Piédelièvre, Philippe de Bremond d’Ars, Noëlie Pierront, Geneviève de La Salle, Charles Pineau, abbot Pierre Kaelin, canon Louis Aubeux, Roger Calmel, Arlette Mayer-Pize, etc.

== List of directors ==
- 1935–1942: Louis de Serres
- 1943–1955: Marcel Labey and Guy de Lioncourt
- 1955–1961: René Alix
- 1961–1971: Olivier Alain
- 1971–c.1985: Charles Brown
