= Maurice Clerc (organist) =

French organist

Maurice Clerc (born 1946) is a French classical organist.

== Life ==
Born in Lyon, Clerc studied at the École normale de musique de Paris with Suzanne Chaisemartin, then at the Conservatoire de Paris where he obtained, in 1975, a first prize for organ in Rolande Falcinelli's class. While continuing this path in interpretation with Gaston Litaize, he frequented, for several years, the lessons of musical improvisation by Pierre Cochereau at the International Academy of Nice. He won the improvisation prize at the international competition in Lyon in 1977.

Clerc has given approximately 1000 recitals in more than twenty-three countries, including 24 tours in North America (United States and Canada). Travelling four continents for thirty years, he has performed in prestigious venues including the cathédrale Notre-Dame de Paris, the St. Patrick's Cathedral, the Lübeck Cathedral, the St Mark's Basilica in Venise, the Saint Joseph's Oratory of Montréal, the St Paul's Cathedral, Melbourne, the NHK auditorium in Tokyo and the Cultural Center of Hong Kong. In 1987, he was invited to give two of the opening concerts of the Flentrop great organ in the new auditorium in Taipei. In 1999, he went to Seoul for the organists convention. This international career has led him to perform in renowned festivals such as Bruges, Ravenna, Madrid, Morelia, Saint-Eustache, Paris, Milstatt, Frankfurt, Budapest, Luxembourg, New-Zealand, Buenos Aires and Montevideo.

Appointed titular organist of the Saint-Bénigne cathedral of Dijon in 1972, he was for thirty-three years a professor at the Conservatoire de Dijon and for twenty years a lecturer at the university.

Clerc has recorded numerous disks devoted to Bach and the German Baroque masters, but considered as one of the specialists in French music of the 19th-20th centuries, he has worked on engraving major works by Franck, Vierne, Dupré, Fleury, Langlais and more recently Cochereau.
