= Anthony Hammond =

Anthony Hammond may refer to:

- Anthony Hammond (politician), English politician, poet and pamphleteer
- Anthony Hammond (legal writer) (1758–1838), English barrister and legal writer
- Anthony Hammond (musician), English organist
- Anthony Hammond (solicitor) (born 1940), British lawyer and public servant
- Anthony Hammond (tennis), Australian tennis player
