= Jeanne Joulain =

French organist (1920–2010)

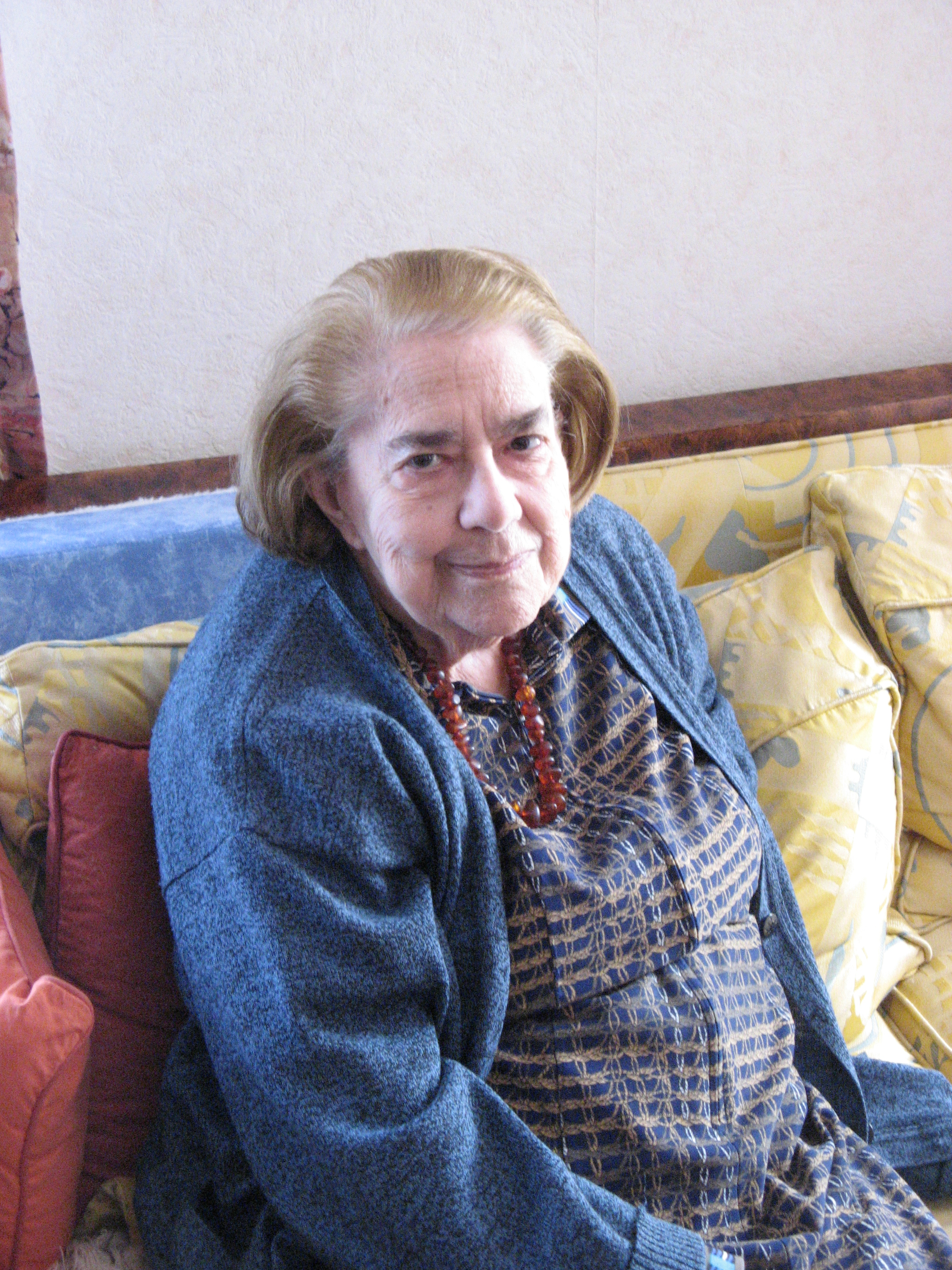
Jeanne Joulain in Lille in April 2008

Jeanne Angèle Desirée Yvonne Joulain (22 July 1920 – 1 February 2010) was a French organist, concertist and music educator.

== Biography ==
Born in Amiens, Joulain's first contact with music was made thanks to her musician parents. Her father, a teacher in Paris, played the violin and her mother was a piano teacher. So it's only natural that she should start playing the piano with her mother. In 1934, after a decisive meeting with the great pianist Raoul Koczalski, Jeanne Joulain entered the conservatory of Amiens. During her studies, she followed the classes of solfeggio, piano (class of Maurice Coze), cello (class of Mario Camerini, pupil of Paul Bazelaire), chamber music, orchestra, harmony, counterpoint, musical composition (classes of Pierre Camus, the director, himself a pupil of composition of Charles-Marie Widor, and organ when the class was created in 1936 (class of Colette Ponchel, one of the last pupils of Louis Vierne) where she won the first prizes. It was during this period that her pedagogical activity began, as she had to make several replacements for teachers of music theory, piano, cello, harmony and organ.

In 1938, the grand organ of Amiens Cathedral was restored. After the inauguration concert given by Marcel Dupré, a small orchestra was formed to accompany Salvation. Jeanne Joulain was a member of this orchestra as a cellist and it was on this occasion that she was introduced to Marcel Dupré by Pierre Camus, the director of the conservatory.

In 1943, after her first training at the Conservatoire d'Amiens, her desire to go further prompted her to enrol at the École César Franck, where she perfected in the same disciplines and obtained diplomas of piano (class of Jean Batalla), cello (class of Edwige Bergeron-Brachet), organ (class of Édouard Souberbielle and Abel Decaux) after two years. In addition, she won the diploma of musical composition (class of Guy de Lioncourt) after five years.

In 1945, Jeanne Joulain decided to write to Marcel Dupré with the intention of taking private lessons. The latter, after having assessed her level, offered to prepare her to enter the conservatory. For two years, she attended the "petit cours" in Meudon and in 1947 she passed the entrance exam for the Conservatoire de Paris. where she obtained the First prize of organ and musical improvisation in 1952 (class of Marcel Dupré).

In 1950, she won the competitions to be able to teach and began teaching in February 1951 at the Conservatoire de Lille. In October 1952 at that of Roubaix, which she left for the conservatory of Douai from 1960 to 1970. Her teaching activities ceased in 1982.

In the long list of people who have attended her courses were Michel Alabau (organist in charge of the Saint-Séverin church in Paris), René Courdent (organist in charge of churches Saint-Christophe and Notre-Dame des Anges of Tourcoing), Patrick Delabre (titular organist of the Cathedral Notre-Dame de Chartres), Yves Devernay (titular organist of Notre-Dame de Paris), Jérôme Faucheur (titular organist of the churches of Bondues and Wambrechies and organ teacher in Comines and Hazebrouck), Marie-Agnès Grall-Menet (titular organist of the grand organ of Saint-Nicolas-du-Chardonnet church in Paris), Philippe Lefèbvre (titular organist of Notre-Dame de Paris), Jean-Philippe Mesnier (successor of Jeanne Joulain as organ teacher at the Douai Conservatory (1970-2000), titular organist of the Saint-Pierre de Douai collegiate church), Marguerite Spillaert (honorary organist of the Saint-Pierre-Saint-Paul church in Lille) etc.

She was titular organist of the Sainte Jeanne d'Arc church in Amiens, of the Mutin-Cavaillé-Coll of the Collégiate church Saint-Pierre of Douai and finally of the Delmotte of the Saint-Maurice church in Lille.

She has given numerous recitals in France (including in Chartres Cathedral, Saint-Sulpice, Notre-Dame de Paris, Bordeaux, Béziers, Toulon, Belley, and abroad (Altenberg, Mons, Brussels, Tournai, St Brice and Tournai Cathedral, St. Patrick's Cathedral in New-York city, and St Paul's Cathedral in London).

In addition to her teaching and concert work, she was a correspondent for the Musique-Sacrée magazine L'Organiste. She also participated in numerous juries of competitions for organ classes.

Jeanne Joulain died in Lille on 1 February 2010 at the age of 89. Many fellow organists were present at her funeral in Lille, during which the organ was played by Jean Guillou.

== Works ==
Jeanne Joulain is the author of pieces for solo organ, voice and piano, voice and orchestra and various instrumental ensembles.

In addition, she has made several reconstructions of improvisations on the organ by Pierre Cochereau.

- 1936–1943: 9 mélodies pour chant et piano: Mon âme a son secret (Félix Arvers), Soir d'été (Albert Samain), Le jardin mouillé (Henri de Régnier), La mer (Henri de Régnier), La lune blanche (Paul Verlaine), La légende des Perce-neige (Jeanne Paruit), Vierge sainte (Abbé Perreyve), Promenade sur l'eau (André Theuriet) and Le page d'automne (Janette de Neaux); unpublished
- O, la splendeur de notre joie: mélodie for voice and piano (Émile Verhaeren); unpublished
- 1937: Les peupliers: mélodie for voice and piano (Rosemonde Gérard); unpublished
- 1938: Cantabile: piece for organ; unpublished
- 1938-1943 La source: mélodie for voice and piano or orchestra (anonymous); unpublished
- 1939: Thème et variation (on the name of Pierre Camus): piece for organ; unpublished
- 1940-1943 Chanson bengalie: mélodie for voice and piano or orchestra (Rabindranath Tagore); unpublished
- 1941: Variation sur un thème breton: piece for organ; unpublished
- 1941: Prélude: piece for organ; unpublished
- 1942: Communion: piece for organ; unpublished
- 1942: O vent fou!: mélodie for voice and piano (Rabindranath Tagore); unpublished
- 1942: Domine non sum dignus: motet with 4 mixed voices, unpublished
- 1942: Factus es repente: motet with 4 mixed voices; unpublished
- 1943–1944 Lamento: piece for organ or orchestra; unpublished
- 1944: Berceuse: mélodie for voice and piano (Maurice de Noisay); unpublished
- 1942-1945: Cantantibus organis: motet with 3 mixed voices, organ and accompaniment for strings; unpublished
- 1943-1945 Ave verum corpus: motet with 3 mixed voices and accompaniment for strings; unpublished
- 1943: Sarabande et gigue: piece for piano; unpublished
- 1943: Trois heures chez Lafleur: Patoisante musical fantasy for soloists, choir and orchestra (lyrics by Camille Dupetit); unpublished
- 1944: Le chant du coq: musical comedy in 1 act for soloist and orchestra (lyrics by André Schneider); unpublished
- 1944: Le rêve d'une mère: choreographic poem for chamber orchestra (lyrics by Jean Dubillet); unpublished
- 1945: Air de Ruth: excerpt from the 2nd song of "Booz" for soprano and piano (lyrics by André Schneider); unpublished
- 1946: Booz: biblical cantata in 5 songs for 4 soloists, choir and orchestra (lyrics by André Schneider); unpublished
- 1945: Antigone: orchestral suite, stage music for a performance of Antigone by Jean Anouilh: Prologue, Le crime d'Antigone, La justice des hommes, La colère de Créon, La plainte des vieillards thébains, La justice des dieux; unpublished
- 1946: Booz: biblical cantata in 5 songs for 4 soloists, choir and orchestra (lyrics by André Schneider); unpublished
- 1947: Symphonie concertante for organ and orchestra in 3 mouvements; unpublished
- 1951: Trois préludes: for piano in G major, B flat major and D minor, unpublished
- 1953: Variation sur "Jesu dulcis memoria": piece for organ; "L'organiste", magazine Musique Sacrée
- 1954-1956: Trois pièces pour une Messe en l'honneur de la Sainte Vierge: Entrée - Offertoire - Communion: pieces for organ; "L'organiste", magazine Musique Sacrée
- 1958: Communion pour une Messe en l'honneur de la Sainte Vierge: piece for organ; "L'organiste", magazine Musique Sacrée
- 1958: Noël Flamand: piece for organ 1) series Orgue et Liturgie issue 40 2) Édition Chantraine, Tournai in 1994
- 1959: Final on "Ave Maris Stella" pour une Messe en l'honneur de la Sainte Vierge: piece for organ; "L'organiste", magazine Musique Sacrée
- 1959: Prélude à l'Introït pour la fête des Rameaux Hosanna Filio David; series Orgue et Liturgie issue 47
- 1961: Paraphrase pour la fête de la Toussaint "Justorum animae in manu Dei sunt": piece for organ; series Orgue et Liturgie issue 52
- 1962: In memoriam Louis Vierne: piece for organ; 1)L'organiste, magazine Musique Sacrée 2) Édition Chantraine, Tournai en 1995
- 1963: Communion pour tous les temps "Adoro Te": piece for organ; series Orgue et Liturgie issue 62
- 1972: Introduction and Dance (for the inauguration of an 18th century Tannenberg piano found in Lititz, Pennsylvania.): for piano, unpublished
- 1988: Canzona a 12 by Giovanni Gabrieli: adaptation for 2 organs; unpublished
- 1988: Canzona noni toni by Giovanni Gabrieli (Sacrae symphoniae Venice 1597): adaptation for 2 organs; unpublished
- 1988: Trois versets de Vêpres (4th - 6th - 7th) improvised by Pierre Cochereau: reconstitution for organ; Éditions Chantraine, Tournai in 1997
- 1988: Fugue du "Triptyque symphonique" improvised by Pierre Cochereau after the disc FY 059/60 recorded in Notre-Dame de Paris in 1977: reconstitution for organ; unpublished
- 1988: Pièce d'orgue; unpublished, (1st part) of the Prelude and Fugue on Antoine Drizenko's name)
- 1988: Treize improvisations sur les versets de Vêpres by Pierre Cochereau: reconstitution for organ, Éditions Chantraine, Tournai in 1997; Éditions Butz, St Augustin in 2008
- 1988–1991 Prélude et fugue (on the name of Antoine Drizenko): piece for orgue, Édition Chantraine, Tournai in 1997
- Elevation on "Victimae Pascali" : piece for organ; series "Orgue et Liturgie" issue 57
- Postlude (on the name of Allan Remsen): piece for organ; series Orgue et Liturgie, issue 70
- 1990: Neuf pièces improvisées en forme de Suite française de Pierre Cochereau: reconstitution d'après le disque FY 059 enregistré aux grandes orgues de Notre Dame de Paris in March–June 1977, Édition Chantraine, Tournai in 1994
- 1991: Patchwork: piece for 2 organs; unpublished
- 1992: Cortège: piece for trumpet and organ; unpublished
- 1993: La Lucchesina (1601) by G. Guami (1540-1611): adaptation for 2 organs, unpublished
- 1993: Prélude en la mineur: for piano; unpublished
- 1995: Boite à musique: piece for piano, unpublished
- 1996: Messe en Mi "à la mémoire de Maurice Duruflé": for countertenor and organ; unpublished
- 1997: Trio: for piano, horn and flute; unpublished

== Awards ==
- 1952 - First prize of organ of the conservatoire de Paris.

== Bibliography ==
- Entretien avec Jeanne Joulain; Norbert Dufourcq; L’Orgue, issue 206 (1988/II)
- Pour l’amour de la Musique. Jeanne Joulain. Repères biographiques Étienne Delahaye; L'Orgue, issue 290 (2010/II)
