= Michel Bouvard (organist) =

French classical organist (born 1958)

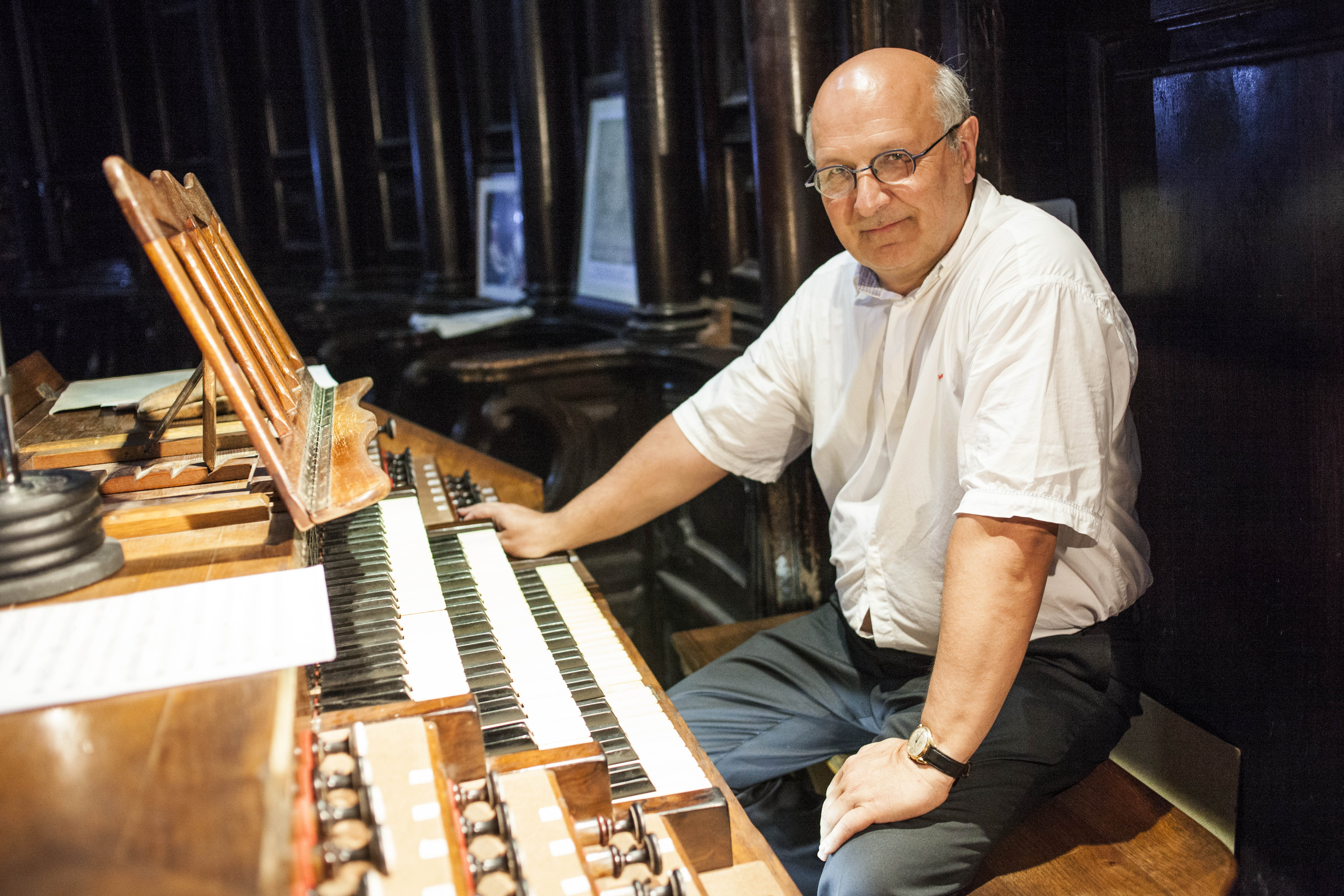
Michel Bouvard in 2015

Michel Bouvard (born 16 January 1958 in Lyon) is a French classical organist.

He is the grandson of composer Jean Henri Antoine Bouvard and studied organ under André Isoir and Suzanne Chaisemartin.

Since 1996, he has been titular organist of the great organ of the Basilica of Saint-Sernin in Toulouse and is also one of three cotitular organists at the Palace of Versailles. He served as the professor of organ at the Conservatoire de Paris from 1995 to 2021, alongside Olivier Latry.

== Discography ==
- François Couperin: Messe des couvents avec plain-chant baroque alterné

Sony classical - Organ of Cintegabelle
Sony classical - Organ of Saint-Maximin

- Johann Sebastian Bach: Clavier-Übung III

Sony classical - BMG - Orgue Grenzing du CNSM of Lyon

- French authors of the 16th and 17th centuries

Works by Eustache du Caurroy, Charles Racquet, Louis Couperin...
Various pieces
Chamade - organ of Mesnil-Amelot

- Louis Vierne: Messe solennelle pour 2 orgues et chœur and Pièces de fantaisie

Charles-Marie Widor: Symphonie romane (written especially for the Basilique Saint-Sernin de Toulouse, a Romanesque basilica that had strongly impressed Widor)
Tempéraments - Chœur des Éléments - Organ of Saint-Sernin in Toulouse

- Maurice Duruflé: Requiem

Hortus - Chœur des Éléments - Organ of Notre-Dame du Taur in Toulouse

- Alexandre Pierre François Boëly: 14 préludes sur des cantiques de Denizot.

Bach: extracts from the Orgelbüchlein.
Jean Bouvard: 3 Noëls variés
AOM - Organ of Saint-Jacques in Muret

- "L’orgue Cavaillé-Coll de Saint-Sernin de Toulouse":

Works by Charles-Marie Widor, Franz Liszt, César Franck, Louis Vierne
Éditions Solstice
