= Falcinelli =

Falcinelli is an Italian surname. Notable people with the surname include:

- Amleto Falcinelli (1921–1996), Italian boxer, after whom asteroid 7963 Falcinelli was named
- Diego Falcinelli (born 1991), Italian footballer
- Rolande Falcinelli (1920–2006), French musician

== See also ==
- 7963 Falcinelli, a main-belt asteroid
