= Léonce de Saint-Martin =

French organist and composer

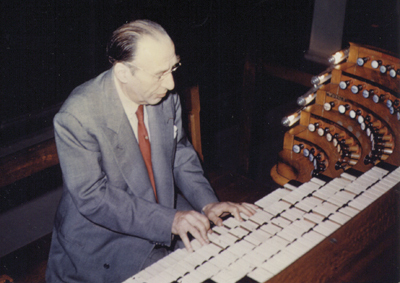
- Saint-Martin at the console of the Notre-Dame organ

Background information
- Born: 31 October 1886
- Origin: France
- Died: 10 June 1954 (aged 67)

Léonce Marie-Joseph, Comte de Saint-Martin-de-Paylha (31 October 1886 – 10 June 1954) was a French organist and composer. He served as titular organist of Notre-Dame de Paris from 1937 until his death.

== Biography ==
He was born in Albi, Tarn, into an aristocratic family. One of his distant relatives was Louis Claude de Saint-Martin.

In 1937 he succeeded Louis Vierne as organist at Notre-Dame de Paris, having previously been Vierne's assistant for 17 years. He held the post until his death in 1954.

Saint-Martin was heavily attacked for his appointment to Notre Dame by the Cathedral chapter, since it was done without competition. Saint-Martin was also mainly self-taught, and did not enter the conservatory, and thus was deemed to be an amateur organist. These accusations were easily seen to be false by eye-witnesses, such as Pierre Cochereau, who took Saint-Martin's place as titular organist after the latter's death. An example of his fine skill can be seen in his organ compositions, filled with emotional and spiritual writing. Saint-Martin was also a pious man, as he stated "but whatever the Good Lord wills is fine by me" concerning his death. His virtuosity can be seen by the fact that he played Marcel Dupré's op. 7 to the satisfaction of Dupré's wife, Jeanne Pascouau, at a time when Charles-Marie Widor stated that these pieces were unplayable.

He held a recital tour of the United States in 1940. He later died in Paris.

On the 10th anniversary of his death, the association "Les Amis de Léonce de Saint-Martin" was created on February, 27th of 1963. The association organise a special event every 10 years since his death, which has included artists such as Pierre Cochereau, Jehan Revert, Michel Chapuis and Pierre Pincemaille.

== Works ==
=== For organ solo ===
- Six pièces brèves op. 11 (1926)
1. Prélude
2. Pastorale
3. Intermezzo
4. Andante
5. Choral
6. Final
- Offertoire pour Fêtes simples de la Sainte Vierge op. 10 (1929)
- Suite cyclique op. 11 (1930)
1. Prélude
2. Fugue
3. Cantilène
4. Carillon
- Scherzo de concert op. 18 (1930)
- Paraphrase du psaume 136: super flumina Babylonis op. 15
1. Tristesse des Hébreux captifs de Babylone
2. Lamentation au souvenir de Jérusalem
3. Babylone la Superbe
4. Les Hébreux maudissent leurs vainqueurs
- Offertoire sur deux noëls op. 19 (1937)
- Stèle pour un artiste défunt (dedicated to Louis Vierne) op. 20 (1938)
- Postlude de fête «Te Deum laudamus» op. 21 (1938)
- Berceuse de Noël op. 25 (1939)
- Genèse op. 26 (1940)
1. La marche sous la malédiction
2. Les éléments et la vie
3. Mort d'Adam; prière et mort d'Ève
- Passacaille op. 28 (1940)
- Choral-Prélude pour le temps de l'Avent op. 31 (1940)
- Venez, divin Messie op. 32 (1940)
- Pastorale op. 35 (1942)
- Le salut à la Vierge op. 34 (1944)
- Toccata de la Libération op. 37 (1944)
- À la gloire de saint Louis op. 33 (1945)
- Toccata et fugue de la Résurrection op. 38 (1945)
- Symphonie Dominicale op. 39 (1946–1948)
1. Prélude
2. Aria
3. Fantaisie-Choral
4. Prière
5. Postlude
- Symphonie Mariale op. 40 (1948–1949)
1. Prélude
2. Salve Regina
3. Ave Regina
4. Alma Redemptoris
5. Postlude
- Cantique Spirituel op. 41 (1950)

=== For choir ===
- Tu es Petrus (4 voices and 2 organs) op. 7 (1929)
- Messe en Mi (4 voices, 2 organs, 3 trumpets and 3 trombones ad lib.) op. 13 (1931–1932)
- Ave Maria (voices and organ) op. 17 (1934)
- Panis angelicus (choir and organ) op. 27 (1940)
- Kyrie funèbre (4 voices and 2 organs, brass ad lib.) op. 36 (1944)
- Magnificat (4 voices and 2 organs) op. 42 (1950–1951)

=== For organ and other instruments ===
- In Memoriam, Paraphrase de l'Hymne national (organ and brass)

=== Mélodies (voices and piano) ===
- Soir d'automne (1910)
- Six mélodies
1. Paris d'avril
2. Grisaille
3. Mariez-vous
4. Cimetière de Paris
5. L'heure du thé
6. Vampire
- L'enfant
- Hymne à la très chère op. 13 (1932)
- Sur les balcons du ciel op. 14 (1932)
- Midi
- Novembre
- Hiver
- Ivresse au printemps
- Esquisse on a poem from Tristan Klingsor (1945)
- Espérance (1952)

== Transcriptions ==
- Concerto Grosso n°8 « Pour une nuit de Noël » - Corelli
- Passacaille - F. Couperin le Grand
- La grande Porte de Kiev - Moussorgsky
- ''Le vol du bourdon'' - Rimsky-Korsakov
- Saint-François de Paule marchant sur les flots - Liszt

== Transcribed Improvisations ==
- Improvisation pour l'élévation - Transcribed by Jason Baruk
- Improvisation Libre - Transcribed by Jason Baruk
- Entrée Improvisé pour Noël - Transcribed by Jason Baruk

== Bibliography ==
- Jean Guérard, Léonce de Saint-Martin à Notre-Dame de Paris (la vie et l'œuvre), Paris, Éditions de l'Officine, 2005, 328 p. (www.publiecriprint.com)
