= Olivier Latry =

French musician

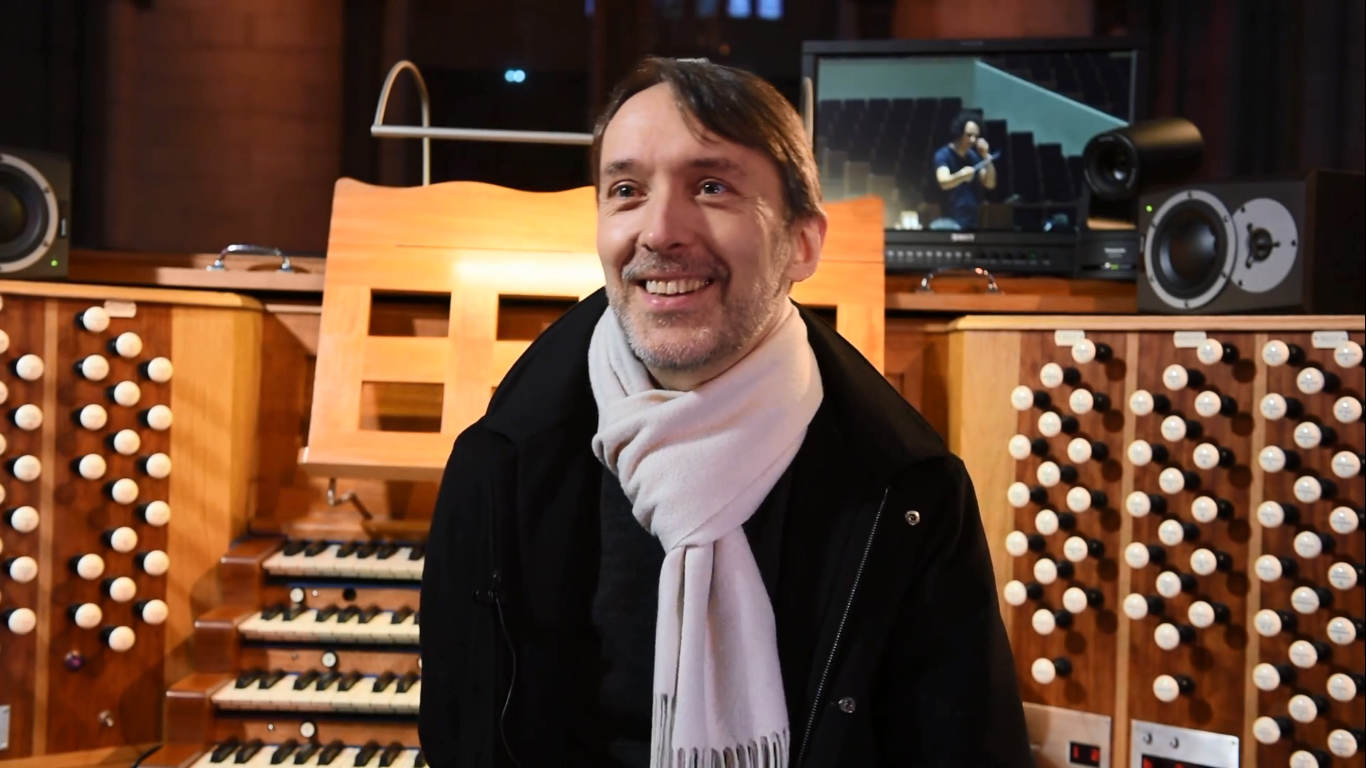
- Olivier Latry at the organ of Lille Cathedral
- Born: 22 February 1962 (age 64); Boulogne-sur-Mer, France
- Education: Conservatoire national supérieur de musique et de danse de Paris; Conservatoire à rayonnement régional de Boulogne-Billancourt; Conservatoire à rayonnement régional de Saint-Maur-des-Fossés
- Occupations: Organist; Improviser; Composer; Academic teacher
- Organizations: Notre-Dame de Paris; Conservatoire de Paris
- Notable work: Salve Regina
- Title: Organiste titulaire de Notre-Dame-de-Paris Professeur d'orgue à l'Conservatoire de Paris
- Predecessor: NDdP: Pierre Cochereau; CdP: Michel Chapuis
- Spouses: Marie-Thérèse Triton (div. 2010) Shin-Young Lee (m. 2013)
- Children: 3

Olivier Jean-Claude Latry (French pronunciation: [ɔlivje ʒɑ̃ klod latʁi]; born 22 February 1962) is a French organist, improviser, teacher and composer who has served as one of the four titular organists of Notre-Dame de Paris since 1985 and is a professor of organ in the Conservatoire de Paris.

== Family and education ==
Latry was born in Boulogne-sur-Mer in northern France, the youngest of three sons of Robert Latry and Andrée Thomas. His early interest in the organ came from listening to recordings of Pierre Cochereau, organist of Notre-Dame de Paris from 1955 to 1984. His first experience on a church organ was in 1974, when he played at the wedding of a family friend. During the homily, his arms supposedly fell onto the organ console, causing a dissonant sound.

Having begun his musical studies in Boulogne-sur-Mer, Latry later enrolled in an organ class at the conservatory in Saint-Maur-des-Fossés near Paris with the blind organist Gaston Litaize, whom he had heard in concert, and took composition classes with Jean-Claude Raynaud at the Conservatoire de Paris. Both his teachers had studied under Marcel Dupré.

Latry's first wife was Marie-Thérèse Triton, whom he divorced in 2011. Since 2012 he has been married to Shin Young Lee. He is the father of three children.

== Career ==
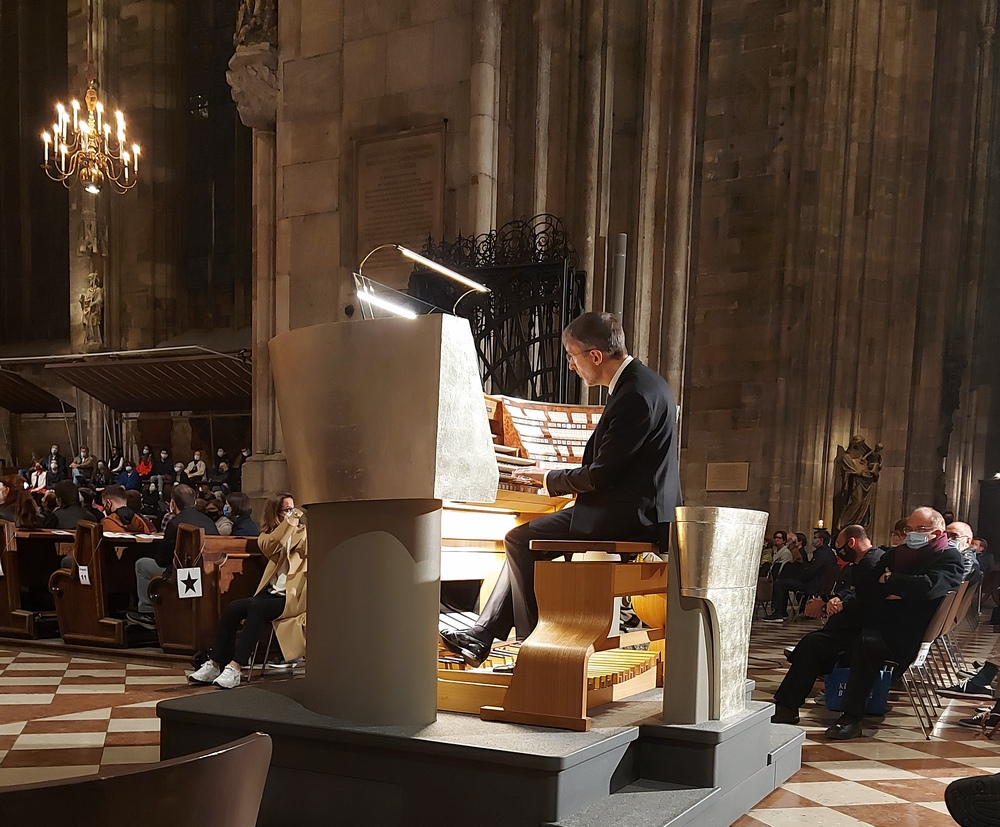
Latry playing the organ at St. Stephen's Cathedral, Vienna, in 2020.

In 1983 Latry was appointed professor of organ in the Catholic University of Paris and subsequently held similar roles at conservatories in Rheims, Saint-Maur-des-Fossés (in 1990, as Litaize's successor) and Paris (in 1995, a post held jointly with Michel Bouvard).

In 1985, following the death of Pierre Cochereau, he became one of the four co-titular organists at Notre-Dame in Paris alongside Yves Devernay, Philippe Lefèbvre and Jean-Pierre Leguay. He is the only one still in the role.

As a concert performer Latry has played in over 40 countries across five continents, in particular in the United States, where he gave his first recitals in 1986 at the invitation of the American Guild of Organists.

On 7 December 2024 Latry was the first to play the organ of Notre-Dame in public during the reopening ceremony five years after the fire that damaged parts of the cathedral in 2019. Although the instrument survived intact, it needed to be cleaned and restored, and Latry tuned it at nighttime ahead of the reopening.

== Musicianship and style ==
Although Latry does not specialize in the music of a specific time period, he has gained a reputation for performing music by his contemporaries. He is renowned for performing the music of Olivier Messiaen, whose complete organ works he has recorded for Deutsche Grammophon. He is also a distinguished improviser, in the French tradition exemplified by Charles Tournemire, Dupré, Cochereau and others. Influenced by his Catholic faith, he based his 2007 work for organ and choir, Salve Regina, a reflection on the Gregorian Marian hymn, on previous improvisations.

== Awards ==
In 2000 the Simone and Cino Del Duca Foundation awarded Latry its music prize, and in 2007 he became a Fellow of the Royal College of Organists. In 2019 he became an Officer of the Ordre des Arts et des Lettres.
