= Anthony Hammond (musician) =

British concert organist and author (b. 1977)

Anthony W. Hammond (born 1977 in Shropshire) is a British concert organist and author.

== Biography ==
Hammond studied music at the University of Bristol. Having held Organ Scholarships at Chester Cathedral and then St. Mary Redcliffe, Bristol, in 2002 he was appointed Sub-Organist at Bristol Cathedral. In July 2003, he moved to Cirencester Parish Church, in the heart of the Cotswolds, as Assistant Director of Music, subsequently being promoted to the post of Director of Music and Organist there in 2006 which he held for 13 years. In 2019 he was appointed Director of Music of St John's, Edinburgh taking up his post in May of that year. He studied the organ in England with Roger Fisher and David Briggs, and in Paris with Dr. Naji Hakim. A Fellow of the Royal College of Organists and winner of the Dixon Prize for Improvisation, his passion for French organ music and improvisation led to seven years of doctoral research into the career and technique of legendary French organist and improviser Pierre Cochereau. He was awarded his Ph.D. in July 2010 by the University of Bristol for this work.

He has recorded several CDs, most of which are on the Priory label. One of these includes his own reconstruction of a symphony improvised by Pierre Cochereau at St. Mary’s Cathedral, San Francisco, in 1972. The score of this reconstruction was published by Dr. J. Butz in October 2009. His recordings for Priory, including an album of Elgar organ music, an album his own improvisations, and a volume in their Great European Organs series recorded on the newly rebuilt Willis/Harrison instrument in Cirencester Parish Church, have received widespread critical acclaim He has broadcast for the B.B.C. and has given recitals in churches, cathedrals and concert halls throughout the U.K. and in Europe.

In October 2009, he made his American solo debut at St. Mary’s Cathedral, San Francisco, where he played at the invitation of the American Guild of Organists. More recently USA concert venues include Washington National Cathedral and Cathedral of the Holy Cross (Boston). In 2012, the University of Rochester Press (Eastman School of Music) published a book on Pierre Cochereau, the first full length English language study of the musician, written with full assistance and support from the Cochereau family and former colleagues.

== Discography ==
- Léonce de Saint-Martin (1886-1954) – Organ works | Œuvres pour orgue | Vol. 1 - La Madeleine, Paris (2016) Ifo Classics
- Great European Organs: 98 - Anthony Hammond plays the organ of L’Eglise St-Vincent, Roquevaire (2016) Priory Records
- French Organ Masterworks and Improvisations César Franck’s Three Chorals and Charles-Marie Widor’s Symphony No. - Anthony Hammond plays the organ of Coventry Cathedral (2014) Raven Compact Discs
- Une Nuit de Noel - Christmas Organ Music by Parisian Composers - Anthony Hammond plays the organ of Cirencester Parish Church (2011) Priory Records
- Great European Organs: 81 - Anthony Hammond plays the organ of Cirencester Parish Church (2010) Priory Records
- Improvisations for the Church Year - The Organ of St. Mary Redcliffe, Bristol (2009) Priory Records
- Sir Edward Elgar: Music for Organ - The Organ of St. Mary Redcliffe, Bristol (2009) Priory Records
- A Phenomenon Without Equal: French Organ Music from Vierne to Cochereau - The Organ of Blackburn Cathedral (2009) Priory Records
- Symphonie Passion: Advent to Easter at Cirencester Parish Church - (2008) CPC Label
- Organ Masterworks from Cirencester Parish Church - (2006) CPC Label

== Transcriptions ==
- Scherzo sur deux Noëls (1959) - Pierre Cochereau (tr, Anthony Hammond)(2011) Dr. J. Butz Musikverlag
- Symphonie Improvisée (San Francisco, 1972) - Pierre Cochereau (tr, Anthony Hammond)(2009) Dr. J. Butz Musikverlag

== Books ==
- Pierre Cochereau: Organist of Notre Dame Anthony Hammond (2012) Eastman Studies in Music.
