= Salve Regina (Latry) =

- Composition for organ by Olivier Latry
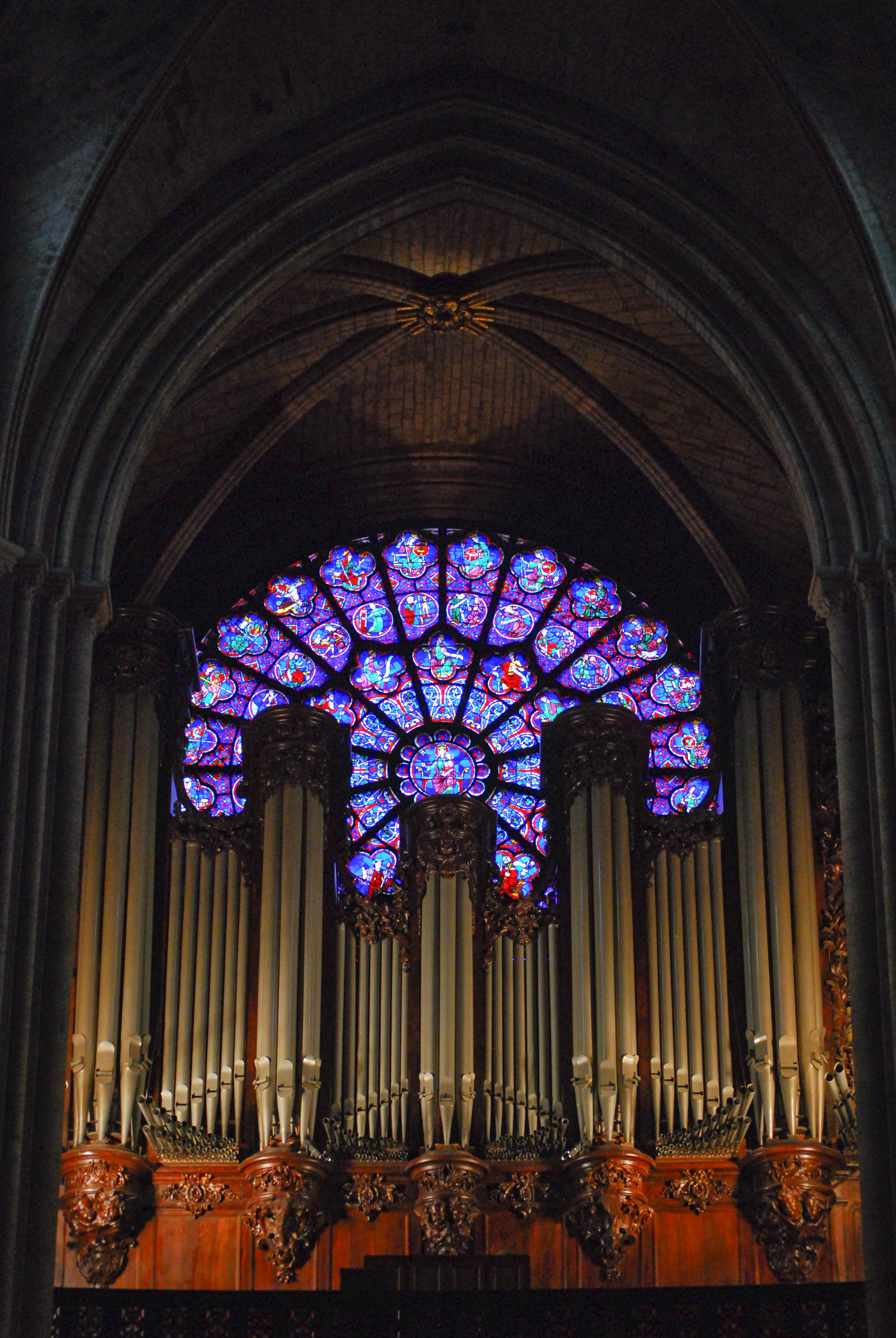
- The Great Organ of Notre-Dame de Paris, where the composer premiered and recorded the piece
- Text: Hymn "Salve Regina"
- Language: Latin
- Performed: 9 October 2007: Notre Dame, Paris
- Published: by Gérard Billaudot
- Duration: 23 minutes
- Movements: 7
- Scoring: Organ; optional: voice(s)

Salve Regina (Hail Holy Queen, literally: Hail, Queen) is a composition for organ by Olivier Latry, a meditation of the Latin hymn "Salve Regina". Each of the seven movements reflects one line of the hymn which can optionally be sung in chant before the related movement. The work was first performed on 9 October 2007 by the composer at Notre Dame in Paris, recorded there and published by Gérard Billaudot.

The work takes about 23 minutes to perform.

== History ==
Latry, organist at Notre-Dame de Paris, is known as an improviser. He realised the idea of commenting the Gregorian chant of the Marian hymn by organ music first in improvisation in Lawrence at the University of Kansas in 1999 in the final concert of a conference of church music. The composer performed the work first at the Grand Orgue of Notre Dame on 9 October 2007, with singer Emmanuel Bouquet and the Maîtrise Notre Dame de Paris. It was published by Gérard Billaudot. Latry recorded it along with other contemporary compositions related to Mary. He played the United States premiere at St. Ignatius Loyola in New York City on April 15, 2009.

== Structure ==
Each of the seven movements reflects one line of the hymn which can optionally be sung in chant before the related movement. The singing can be performed by a female or male soloist, a schola or a children's choir. The movement are contrasting in character.

1. Salve Regina – Avec la liberté du chant grégorien (With the freedom of Gregorian chant)
2. Vita dulcedo – Calme (Calm)
3. Ad te clamamus – Martelé, sauvage (Hammered, wild)
4. Ad te suspiramus – Sombre, implacable (Dark, relentless)
5. Eia ergo – Profond (Profound)
6. Et Jesum – Comme une lente procession (Like a slow procession)
7. O clemens

Latry expresses the different emotions of the calls to Mary by markings which focus more on the mood than the tempo. Salve Regina (Hail, holy Queen, Mother of Mercy) has the liberty of Gregorian chant. Vita dulcedo (Hail, our life, our sweetness and our hope) is calm. Ad te clamamus (To thee do we cry, poor banished children of Eve) is an exclamation, hammering and wild. Ad te suspiramus (To thee do we send forth our sighs, mourning and weeping in this vale of tears) appears dark and relentless. Eia ergo (Turn then, most gracious advocate, Thine eyes of mercy toward us) is profound. Et Jesum (And after this our exile, show unto us the blessed fruit of thy womb, Jesus) is a slow procession. The last call O clemens (O clement, O loving, O sweet Virgin Mary) has no marking. It ends like bells.

The composer wrote in his program notes for the US premiere of Christians in "moments of deep faith, joy, doubt, incomprehension, despair, rebellion, hope, bliss and beatitude", expressed in the reflections of the invocation to Mary. The reviewer of a performance on 7 November in St. Bonifatius, Wiesbaden, interpreted by Gabriel Dessauer, described the work as surprisingly retrospect ("erstaunlich rückwärtsgewandt") and noted that it made the listener feel the complete cosmos of humanity, including the cruelty and violence, from which to be freed the prayer requests ("den gesamten Kosmos des Menschlichen nachempfinden ließ, einschließlich der Grausamkeit und Gewalt, aus der in diesem Gebet um Errettung gebeten wird").
