= Pierre Cochereau =

French organist and composer (1924–1984)

- Born: Pierre Eugène Charles Cochereau; 9 July 1924; Saint-Mande, Val-de-Marne, France
- Died: 6 March 1984 (aged 59); Lyon, France
- Occupations: Organist; Composer Pedagogue

Pierre Eugène Charles Cochereau (9 July 1924 – 6 March 1984) was a French organist, improviser, composer, and pedagogue.

Cochereau was titular organist of the cathedral of Notre-Dame de Paris from 1955 to his death in 1984 and was responsible for a controversial renovation of the cathedral's organ in the 1960s. He was greatly renowned as an improviser and organist in his lifetime and still is today.

After his death, the Conservatory of Nice was renamed in his honour.

== Biography ==
Pierre Cochereau was born on 9 July 1924 in the French commune of Saint-Mandé (Val-de-Marne), near the capital city of Paris. His father, Georges Ernest Cochereau, was a wealthy factory owner who owned a shoemaking factory. In 1929, after a few months of violin instruction, he began to take piano lessons with Marius-François Gaillard. Marguerite Long became his piano teacher in 1933, and three years later, Paul Pannesay. When Cochereau was 13 years old, after suffering a year of poor health and poor performance in school, Cochereau's father sent him to recuperate in a village in the South of France. Cochereau was allowed the key to the local church so he could practise piano, however one day he discovered a 2 manual pipe organ by Cavaillé-Coll. The church's titular organist agreed to show him the instrument on 2 June 1937, which was coincidentally the day that Louis Vierne, the then-organist of Notre-Dame-de-Paris, died at the console of the organ during his 1750th organ recital. Some viewed this as an 'apostolic succession', as Cochereau would hold the exact same post 18 years later.

In 1938, Cochereau took lessons with Marie-Louise Girod, a student of Marcel Dupré. He continued his organ studies with André Fleury and Paul Delafosse, whom Cochereau succeeded as titular organist at Saint-Roch in Paris in 1942.

After one year of law studies, Cochereau decided to dedicate himself to a musical career, and entered the Conservatory of Paris in 1943. He left the Conservatory in 1949 with first prizes in harmony (class of Maurice Duruflé) - alongside Pierre Labric, music history, fugue and counterpoint (class of Noël Gallon), composition (class of Tony Aubin), and organ (class of Marcel Dupré).

In September 1948, Cochereau made his first recital tour to Hungary. One year later, he married Nicole Lacroix, a pianist and composer, with whom he had two children: Jean-Marc (1949–2011), conductor and late director of the Tours Conservatory, and Marie-Pierre, a professional harpist.

In 1949, at age 26, Pierre Cochereau was appointed director of the Le Mans Conservatory, a term he occupied for seven years. In 1955, he succeeded Léonce de Saint-Martin (1886–1954) as titular organist at Notre Dame Cathedral in Paris, after applying to the post just days before the deadline. However, a delay occurred, due to Cochereau's failure to provide a home address.

In 1956, his recording of Marcel Dupré's Symphonie-Passion, Op. 23 was awarded the Grand Prix du Disque. The same year, Cochereau made his first of 25 recital tours to the United States, producing a CD of music played at Notre-Dame, as well as an improvised symphony at Boston Symphony Hall.

In 1961, Cochereau became director of the Nice Conservatory (the conservatoire now bears his name), which he left in 1979, accepting the directorship of the Lyon Conservatory.

=== Death and legacy ===
Pierre Cochereau died in the early hours of 6 March 1984 in Lyon after suffering from a cerebral hemorrhage; he unsuccessfully attempted to reach a telephone to call for help. He was buried at the Cimetière Belleville in Paris next to members of his family. Following his death, Notre-Dame appointed four titulaires des grands orgues: Olivier Latry, Yves Devernay (died 1990), Philippe Lefèbvre and Jean-Pierre Leguay (retired 2015).

Pierre Cochereau had a worldwide reputation as a concert organist and especially as a brilliant improviser. In his improvisations, Cochereau had created a musical language that was eminently personal, recognizable as of the opening notes. His many stylistic influences regarding counterpoint, formal structure, and harmonic language included composers such as Marcel Dupré, Maurice Duruflé, Noël Gallon, Olivier Messiaen, and Florent Schmitt.

He oversaw a controversial transformation of the Cavaillé-Coll organ at Notre-Dame realised by Jean Hermann and the Boisseaus Jean-Loup and Robert, and was regularly pushing for more changes to combine the French symphonic style with the 18th century style of the Clicquot dynasty.

Cochereau was an avid smoker and was also known for accumulating numerous speeding fines. His other personal interests included aeroplanes, ships, trains, and other vehicles.

As a composer, Cochereau left several organ works, chamber music, and choir compositions. Many of Cochereau's organ improvisations have been transcribed and published by other organists, such as David Briggs, Jeremy Filsell and Jeanne Joulain. He was also one of the cofounders of the Grand Prix de Chartres organ competition (alongside Pierre Firmin-Didot).

In 2012 Anthony Hammond published, with the University of Rochester Press (Eastman School of Music), a book on Pierre Cochereau – the first full-length English language study of him, written with full assistance and support from the Cochereau family and former colleagues.

A street bears his name in Montpellier as well as an avenue in Roquevaire. The Nice Regional Conservatory also bears his name. He was also a recipient of officership of the prestigious Legion d'honneur.

== Compositions ==
=== Organ solo ===
- Symphonie (composed 1950–55. Tournai, Belgium: Éditions Chantraine, 1996. EC 100)
  1. Adagio et Allegro
  2. Adagio
  3. Scherzando
  4. Allegro
- Trois Variations sur un thème chromatique (composed 1963. Paris: Leduc, 1963)
- Micro-Sonate en Trio, Op. 11 (composed 1969. Paris: Leduc, 1969)
- Variations sur "Ma jeunesse a une fin" , Op. 16 (composed 1972. Paris: Leduc, 1972)

=== Organ with other instruments ===
- Concerto for organ and orchestra in C♯ major (composed 1951. Unpublished.)

=== Works for choir ===
- Paraphrase de la Dédicace for choir, two organs, two brass ensembles, and six tympani (composed 1963. Sankt Augustin, Germany: Dr. J. Butz/Éditions Chantraine. EC 148)
- Hymne (Unpublished.)

=== Chamber music ===
- Songs (Unpublished.)
- Piano Quintet (Unpublished.)

== Transcribed improvisations ==
- Symphonie improvisée
  1. Adagio
  2. Scherzo
  3. Adagio
  4. Toccata
  - Improvised in 1956 at the Aeolian-Skinner organ at Boston Symphony Hall. Transcribed by Jeremy Filsell.
    - Sankt Augustin, Germany: Dr. J. Butz Musikverlag/Éditions Chantraine, 2004. EC 160.
      - Recording: Cochereau: Les "Incunables". Sigean, France: Solstice, 2000. SOCD 177/8. 2 CDs.
- Symphonie en improvisation
  1. Agité
  2. Scherzo
  3. Lent
  4. Final
  - Improvised in December 1963 at Notre-Dame de Paris for Philips. Transcribed by John Scott Whiteley.
    - Sankt Augustin, Germany: Dr. J. Butz Musikverlag/Éditions Chantraine, 2006. EC 161.
      - Recording: Cochereau: La Légende. Sigean, France: Solstice, 2007. SOCD 237. Collection Grandes Orgues Vol. 4: Messiaen/Cochereau. France: Philips, 1995. Philips 446 642–2. 1 CD.
- Treize improvisations sur les versets de vêpres
  - Improvised in December 1963 at Notre-Dame de Paris for Philips. Transcribed by Jeanne Joulain.
    - Tournai, Belgium: Éditions Chantraine, 1997. EC 125.
      - Recording: Pierre Cochereau improvise sur des Noëls. Sigean, France: Solstice, 1997. SOCD 152. 1 CD.
- Prélude et Variations sur "Venez, Divin Messie"
  - Improvised on December 24, 1968, at Notre-Dame de Paris. Transcribed by David Briggs.
    - Tournai, Belgium: Éditions Chantraine, 1998. EC 122.
      - Recording: Cochereau: La Légende. Sigean, France: Solstice, 2007. SOCD 237. 1 CD.
- Sortie sur "Adeste Fideles"
  - Improvised on December 24, 1968, at Notre-Dame de Paris. Transcribed by François Lombard.
    - Tournai, Belgium: Éditions Chantraine. EC 150.
      - Recording: Pierre Cochereau improvise sur des Noëls. Sigean, France: Solstice, 1997. SOCD 152. 1 CD.
- Cantem toto la Gloria
  - Improvised on July 23, 1969, in Collioure (Pyrénées-Orientales; Hartmann Positive organ). Transcribed by David Briggs.
    - Tournai, Belgium: Éditions Chantraine, 1997. EC 120.
      - Recording: Pierre Cochereau: 12 improvisations inédites. Sigean, France: Solstice, 2002. SOCD 200/1. 2 CDs.
- Thème et Variations sur "Alouette, gentille alouette"
  - Improvised in April 1970 at Notre-Dame de Paris for Philips. Transcribed by David Briggs.
    - London: United Music Publishers, 1992.
      - Recording: Collection Grandes Orgues Vol. 16: Cochereau joue Cochereau, Improvisations 1. France: Philips, 1996. Philips 454 655–2. 1 CD.
- Quinze versets sur "Ave Maris Stella"
  - Improvised on August 15, 1970, at Notre-Dame de Paris. Transcribed by François Lombard.
    - Tournai, Belgium: Éditions Chantraine. EC 157.
      - Recording: Pierre Cochereau improvise en concert à Notre-Dame de Paris. Sigean, France: Solstice, 1989. FYCD 127. 1 CD.
- Variations sur un vieux Noël
  - Improvised on December 24, 1972, at Notre-Dame de Paris. Transcribed by Jeremy Filsell.
    - Tournai, Belgium: Éditions Chantraine. EC 137.
      - Recording: Pierre Cochereau improvise en concert à Notre-Dame de Paris. Sigean, France: Solstice, 1989. FYCD 127. 1 CD.
- Introduction, Choral et Variations sur "O Filii et filiæ"
  - Improvised on April 22, 1973, at Notre-Dame de Paris. Transcribed by François Lombard.
    - Tournai, Belgium: Éditions Chantraine, 2000. EC 151.
      - Recording: Pierre Cochereau: L'organiste de Notre-Dame. Sigean, France: Solstice, 1992. SOCD 94/6. 3 CDs.
- Boléro sur un thème de Charles Racquet for organ and percussion
  - Improvised in May 1973 at Notre-Dame de Paris for Philips. Transcribed by Jean-Marc Cochereau.
    - Tournai, Belgium: Éditions Chantraine, 1996. EC 116.
      - Recordings: Cochereau: La Légende. Sigean, France: Solstice, 2007. SOCD 237. Collection Grandes Orgues Vol. 16: Cochereau joue Cochereau, Improvisations 1. France: Philips, 1996. Philips 454 655–2. 1 CD.
- Berceuse à la mémoire de Louis Vierne
  - Improvised in May 1973 at Notre-Dame de Paris for Philips. Transcribed by Frédéric Blanc.
    - Tournai, Belgium: Éditions Chantraine, 1997. EC 119.
      - Recording: Collection Grandes Orgues Vol. 17: Cochereau joue Cochereau, Improvisations 2. France: Philips, 1996. Philips 454 656–2. 1 CD.
- Variations sur "Frère Jacques"
  - Improvised in May 1973 at Notre-Dame de Paris for Philips. Transcribed by François Lombard.
    - Tournai, Belgium: Éditions Chantraine. EC 149.
      - Recording: Collection Grandes Orgues Vol. 17: Cochereau joue Cochereau, Improvisations 2. France: Philips, 1996. Philips 454 656–2. 1 CD.
- Suite à la française sur des thèmes populaires
  1. Prélude "Légende de Saint-Nicolas"
  2. Air "Trimazo"
  3. Gigue "Compagnons de la Marjolaine"
  4. Musette "Nous n'irons plus au bois"
  5. Sarabande "Dans les prisons de Nantes"
  6. Menuet "V'la l'bon vent"
  7. Toccata "Marche des rois"
  - Improvised in May 1973 at Notre-Dame de Paris for Philips. Transcribed by François Lombard.
    - Tournai, Belgium: Éditions Chantraine. EC 115.
      - Recording: Collection Grandes Orgues Vol. 16: Cochereau joue Cochereau, Improvisations 1. France: Philips, 1996. Philips 454 655–2. 1 CD.
- Scherzo symphonique
  - Improvised on February 10, 1974, at Notre-Dame de Paris. Transcribed by Jeremy Filsell.
    - Tournai, Belgium: Éditions Chantraine, 1998. EC 139.
      - Recording: Pierre Cochereau: L'organiste de Notre-Dame. Sigean, France: Solstice, 1992. SOCD 94/6. 3 CDs.
- Sortie sur "Venez, Divin Messie"
  - Improvised in March 1974 at Notre-Dame de Paris for FY/Solstice. Transcribed by François Lombard.
    - Tournai, Belgium: Éditions Chantraine, 1996. EC 113.
      - Recording: Noël à Notre-Dame de Paris. Sigean, France: Solstice, 1994. SOCD 906. 1 CD.
- Suite de Danses for organ and percussion
  1. Marche
  2. Sarabande
  3. Musette
  4. Tambourin
  5. Menuet
  6. Gigue
  - Improvised on May 29, 1974, at Notre-Dame de Paris. Transcribed by David Briggs.
    - Tournai, Belgium: Éditions Chantraine. EC 123.
      - Recording: Cochereau: Deux grandes improvisation en concert. Sigean, France: Solstice, 1985. FYCD 118. 1 CD.
- Sortie sur "Haec Dies"
  - Improvised on March 30, 1975, at Notre-Dame de Paris. Transcribed by François Lombard.
    - Tournai, Belgium: Éditions Chantraine, 1997. EC 112.
      - Recording: Pierre Cochereau: L'organiste de Notre-Dame. Sigean, France: Solstice, 1992. SOCD 94/6. 3 CDs.
- Neuf Pièces improvisées en forme de Suite française
  1. Kyrie
  2. Petit Plein-Jeu
  3. Offertoire
  4. Tierce en taille
  5. Voix humaine
  6. Basse de Cromorne
  7. Flûtes
  8. Basse de Trompette
  9. Grand Plein-Jeu
  - Improvised between March 15 and 18, 1977 at Notre-Dame de Paris for FY/Solstice. Transcribed by Jeanne Joulain.
    - Tournai, Belgium: Éditions Chantraine. EC 64.
      - Recording: Pierre Cochereau: L'art de l'improvisation. Sigean, France: Solstice, 1999. FYCD 059. 1 CD.
- Variations sur un Noël
  - Improvised on June 27, 1977, at Notre-Dame de Paris for FY/Solstice. Transcribed by François Lombard.
    - Tournai, Belgium: Éditions Chantraine, 1997. EC 90.
      - Recording: Pierre Cochereau: L'art de l'improvisation. Sigean, France: Solstice, 1999. FYCD 059. 1 CD.
- Une Messe Dominicale
  1. Entrée
  2. Offertoire
  3. Élévation
  4. Communion
  5. Sortie
  - Improvised on June 28, 1977, at Notre-Dame de Paris for FY/Solstice. Transcribed by François Lombard.
    - Tournai, Belgium: Éditions Chantraine, 1997. EC 114.
      - Recording: Pierre Cochereau: L'art de l'improvisation. Sigean, France: Solstice, 1999. FYCD 059. 1 CD.
- Triptyque symphonique sur deux thèmes
  1. Introduction et Scherzo
  2. Fugue
  3. Final
  - Improvised on June 29, 1977, at Notre-Dame de Paris for FY/Solstice. Transcribed by David Briggs.
    - Tournai, Belgium: Éditions Chantraine, 1998. EC 121.
      - Recording: Pierre Cochereau: L'art de l'improvisation. Sigean, France: Solstice, 1999. FYCD 059. 1 CD.

== Discography ==
- Pierre Cochereau: L'Œuvre écrite
  - Symphonie pour grand orgue; Paraphrase de la Dédicace; Trois Variations sur un thème chromatique; Micro Sonate en trio; Thème et Variations sur "Ma jeunesse a une fin".
    - François Lombard (Symphonie) and Pierre Pincemaille, Organists. Chœur régional Provence-Alpes-Côte d'Azur. Orchestre philharmonique de Marseille. Jean-Marc Cochereau, Conductor. Recorded 1999 at St. Vincent de Roquevaire (Bouches-du-Rhône). Sigean, France: Solstice, 1999. SOCD 163. 1 CD.
- Cochereau
  - A two-hour portrait including numerous archive recordings and interviews on the life and work of Pierre Cochereau.
    - Sigean, France: Solstice, 2004. SODVD 01. 1 DVD.
- Cochereau: Les "Incunables"
  - Liszt: Ad nos, ad salutarem undam; Vierne: 2. Sinfonie e-Moll op. 20; Dupré: Symphonie-Passion op. 20; Cochereau: Symphonie improvisée.
    - Pierre Cochereau, Organist. Recorded 1955 at Notre-Dame de Paris (Liszt, Vierne, Dupré) and in June 1956 (Symphonie improvisée) at Symphony Hall, Boston. Sigean, France: Solstice, 2000. SOCD 177/8. 2 CDs.
- Cochereau: La Legende
  - Symphonie en Improvisation; Treize improvisations sur des versets de Vêpres; Boléro improvisé sur un thème de Charles Racquet for organ and percussion.
    - Pierre Cochereau, Organist. Michel Cals and Michel Gastaud, Percussionists (Boléro improvisé). Recorded in December 1963 (Symphonie, Treize improvisations) and May 1973 (Boléro improvisé) at Notre-Dame de Paris. Sigean, France: Solstice, 2007. SOCD 237. 1 CD.
- Collection Grandes Orgues Vol. 4: Messiaen/Cochereau
  - Olivier Messiaen: Excerpts from La Nativité du Seigneur; Le banquet céleste; Apparition de l’eglise éternelle (February 1972); Symphonie en improvisation (May 1973).
    - Pierre Cochereau, Organist. Recorded at Notre-Dame de Paris. France: Philips, 1995. Philips 446 642–2. 1 CD.
- Pierre Cochereau improvise sur des Noëls aux grandes orgues de Notre-Dame de Paris
  - Pierre Cochereau, Organist. Recorded between 1969 and 1973 at Notre-Dame de Paris. Sigean, France: Solstice, 1997. SOCD 152. 1 CD.
- Pierre Cochereau: 12 Improvisations inédites
  - Concert Tour Summer 1969 in various French cities, played on a two-manual positiv organ by Philippe Hartmann.
    - Pierre Cochereau, Organist. Recorded between July 16 and August 29, 1969. Sigean, France: Solstice, 2002. SOCD 200/1. 2 CDs.
- Collection Grandes Orgues Vol. 16: Cochereau joue Cochereau, Improvisations 1
  - Improvisations sur “Alouette, gentile alouette” (April 1970); Suite à la française sur des thèmes populaires; Boléro sur un theme de Charles Racquet, pour orgue et percussion (May 1973).
    - Pierre Cochereau, Organist. Michel Cals and Michel Gastaud, Percussionists (Boléro). Recorded at Notre-Dame de Paris. France: Philips, 1996. Philips 454 655–2. 1 CD.
- Collection Grandes Orgues Vol. 17: Cochereau joue Cochereau, Improvisations 1
  - Treize improvisations sur des versets de Vêpres (December 1963); Berceuse à la mémoire de Louis Vierne; Variations sur “Frère Jacques“ (May 1973).
    - Pierre Cochereau, Organist. Recorded at Notre-Dame de Paris. France: Philips, 1996. Philips 454 656–2. 1 CD.
- Pierre Cochereau: Deux grandes improvisations en concert
  - Suite de Danses; Prélude, Adagio et Choral Varié.
    - Pierre Cochereau, Organist. Michel Cals and Michel Gastaud, Percussionists (Suite de Danses). Recorded on May 24, 1974 (Suite) and February 27, 1970 (Prélude, Adagio et Choral Varié) at Notre-Dame de Paris. Sigean, France: Solstice, 1985. FYCD 118. 1 CD.
- Pierre Cochereau: L'organiste de Notre-Dame
  - Works by J.S. Bach, César Franck, Olivier Messiaen, Marcel Dupré, and Rouget de Lisle, as well as numerous live recordings of liturgical improvisations and concert improvisations.
    - Pierre Cochereau, Organist. Recorded between 1968 and 1984 at Notre-Dame de Paris and Chartres Cathédrale (Introduction, Choral et Variations sur un thème donné par P. C., September 30, 1973). Sigean, France: Solstice, 1992. SOCD 94/6. 3 CDs.
- Pierre Cochereau, Organ
  - Works by Johann Sebastian Bach, François Couperin, Louis Vierne, Olivier Messiaen and an improvisation on a submitted theme.
    - Pierre Cochereau, Organ. Recorded on July 12, 1970, and July 2, 1972, at the Chiesa Parrocchiale in Magadino, Italy. Bologna, Italy: Ermitage, 1996. ERM 176–2. 1 CD.
- Pierre Cochereau improvise en concert à Notre-Dame de Paris
  - 15 Versets sur Ave Maris Stella; Variations sur un Noël.
    - Pierre Cochereau, Organist. Recorded on August 15, 1970 (Versets) and December 24, 1972 (Variations) at Notre Dame de Paris. Sigean, France: Solstice, 1989. FYCD 127. 1 CD.
- Improvisations sur des thèmes de Pâques à Notre-Dame de Paris
  - Symphonie en 4 mouvements (April 11, 1971); Introduction, Choral, Fugue et Variations (March 26, 1978); Prélude, Adagio, Fugue et Choral Varié (April 19, 1981).
    - Pierre Cochereau, Organist. Recorded at Notre-Dame de Paris. Sigean, France: Solstice, 2003. SOCD 206. 1 CD.
- Pierre Cochereau: L'organiste liturgique
  - Four improvised masses (each including Entrée, Offertoire, Communion and Sortie).
    - Pierre Cochereau, Organist. Recorded between June 1973 and November 1977 at Notre-Dame de Paris. Sigean, France: Solstice, 2003. SOCD 226. 1 CD.
- Grandes Heures Liturgiques à Notre-Dame de Paris
  - Pierre Cochereau, aux grandes Orgues. Maîtrise de Notre-Dame. Jehan Revert, direction. Enregistrée en février et juin de 1973 à Notre-Dame de Paris. Sigean : Fy & Du Solstice, 1993. FYCD 001. 1 CD.
- Noël à Notre-Dame de Paris
  - Pierre Cochereau, Organist. Maîtrise de Notre-Dame. Jehan Revert, Conductor. Recorded in March and June 1974 at Notre-Dame de Paris. Sigean, France: Solstice, 1994. SOCD 906. 1 CD.
- Les offices du dimanche à Notre-Dame de Paris
  - Office de Laudes; Grand’Messe; Vêpres.
    - Pierre Cochereau, Organist. Maîtrise de Notre-Dame/Chorale de la Cathédrale. Jehan Revert, Conductor. Recorded on February 27, 1976, and November 9, 1968, at Notre-Dame de Paris. Sigean, France: Solstice, 1988. FYCD 019. 1 CD.
- Pierre Cochereau: L'art de l'improvisation
  - 30 pièces pour servir de présentation à l'orgue de Notre-Dame.
    - Pierre Cochereau, Organist. Recorded between March 15 and June 29, 1977, at Notre-Dame de Paris. Sigean, France: Solstice, 1999. FYCD 059. 1 CD.
- Organ works by Otto Barblan and Henri Gagnebin
  - Otto Barblan: Toccata op. 23; Fantaisie op. 16; Chaconne op. 10 on BACH. Heni Gagnebin: Toccata; Dialogue et Passacaille. An interview with Pierre Cochereau by Gérard Delatena.
    - Pierre Cochereau, Organist. Recorded in October 1977 at Notre-Dame de Paris. Wiesbaden, Germany: Motette Ursina. Motette M 10350. 1 LP.
- Cochereau: Un Testament Musical
  - Intégrale des 25 improvisations sur l'Evangile selon Saint Matthieu.
    - Pierre Cochereau, Organist. Recorded between February 5 and March 4, 1984, at Notre-Dame de Paris. Sigean, France: Solstice, 1997. SOCD 150/1. 2 CDs.
- Bach sur les orgues de l'église Saint-Roch à Paris
  - Fantaisie et Fugue en sol mineur BWV 542. Grand Prélude et Fugue en mi bémol BWV 552. Passacaille en ut mineur BWV 582.
    - The earliest recording of Pierre Cochereau, made by Michel Bernstein in 1958 (Bernstein's memoirs).
- Organ Symphony by Camille Saint-Saens
  - Herbert von Karajan, Berlin Philharmonic
    - Deutsche Grammophon, 1981, CD.

== Bibliography ==
- Yvette Carbou (ed.): Pierre Cochereau: Témoignages. Éditions Zurfluh, Bourg-la-Reine, France 1999, ISBN 2-87750-087-X
- Yvette Carbou: Pierre Cochereau - Un art d'illusionniste. Éditions Delatour France, 2014. ISBN 978-2-7521-0124-2
- Norbert Düchtel: In memoriam: Pierre Cochereau. Musica sacra 104, no. 3 (1984): 142.
- Anthony Hammond: "Pierre Cochereau: Organist of Notre Dame." UK 2012, Eastman Studies in Music, ISBN 978-1580464055
- Brigitte de Leersnyder (ed.): Pierre Cochereau (1924–1984). In: L'Orgue: Cahiers et memoirs. Numéro Spéciale de la revue trimestrielle L'Orgue 1989. Association des Amis de l'Orgue, ISSN 0030-5170
- François Sabatier. "Pierre Cochereau", in Guide de la musique d’orgue, edited by Gilles Cantagrel. Paris: Fayard, 1991: 274–276.
- Martin Welzel: Organist an Notre-Dame de Paris. Eine Erinnerung an Pierre Cochereau (1924–84) – zum 90. Geburtstag und 30. Todestag. Organ – Journal für die Orgel 17, no. 4 (2014): 42–45.
- Martin Welzel: Pierre Cochereau. Eine Würdigung zum 100. Geburtstag und 40. Todestag. Musica sacra 144, no. 5 (2024): 296–297.
