= Philippe Lefebvre (organist) =

French classical organist

Philippe André Lefebvre (born 2 January 1949) is a French classical organist. He served as titular organist at Notre-Dame de Paris from 1985 to 2024.

== Life ==
Born in Roubaix, Lefebvre first studied philosophy. He took a few lessons from Pierre Cochereau and following his advice, he went to study at the Conservatoire de Lille with Jeanne Joulain, then at the Conservatoire de Paris where he obtained first prizes in organ, improvisation, fugue and counterpoint.

He began by being organist at Marcq-en-Barœul, then was appointed to the Cathedral of Notre-Dame-et-Saint-Vaast d'Arras in November 1968.

He then won the Prix de la Fondation Marcel Bleustein-Blanchet and in 1971, the First Prize for improvisation at the Lyon International Competition, when he had Rolande Falcinelli as his master.

In 1973, he won the grand prix d'improvisation du concours international de Chartres and then became titular organist of the Chartres Cathedral.

He is a guest at major festivals, as a soloist or with orchestra. He regularly gives concerts and master classes in Europe, the United States, Japan, Russia and Eastern Europe.

In 1985, he was appointed titular organist of the cathedral Notre-Dame de Paris, together with Yves Devernay, Olivier Latry and Jean-Pierre Leguay. He succeeds his master Pierre Cochereau.

He is also known for his work as an improviser.

Lefebvre was director of the Lille Conservatory from 1979 to 2003, before being appointed Director of Music at Notre-Dame de Paris (Musique Sacrée à Notre-Dame). From 2002 to 2014, he was professor of improvisation at the Conservatoire de Paris. He is also an improvisation teacher at the Centre d'études supérieures de musique et de danse de Toulouse.

Lefebvre is president of the board of directors of the Association Orgue en France, president of the Association des Grandes Orgues de Chartres, president of the association "Les amis de l'orgue et de la collégiale" in Montreal, organist of the Collégiale de Montréal (Département de l'Aude).

In HD video, Lefebvre explains the functioning of the Organ of Notre Dame de Paris.
