= Édouard Devernay =

French musician, composer and organist

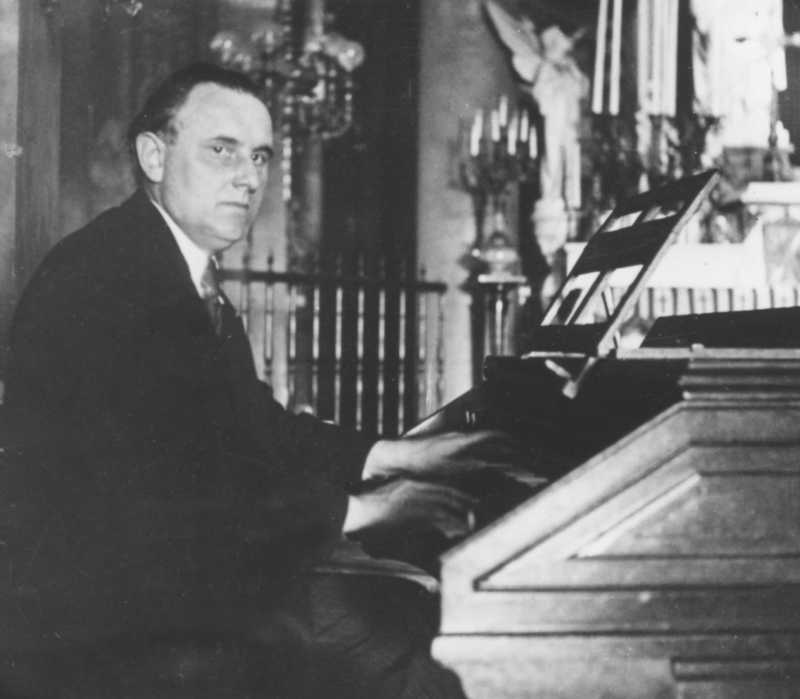
Devernay playing the choir organ of Notre-Dame des Victoires (Trouville-sur-Mer)

Édouard Henri Devernay Jnr. (8 November 1889 – 5 July 1952) was a French musician, composer and organist who held the position of organiste titulaire of the great organ of Notre-Dame-des-Victoires in Trouville-sur-Mer, Calvados, Normandy.

== Biography ==
Born in Roubaix, Devernay was the son of Édouard Joseph (8 April 1854 in Roubaix – 13 May 1906 ibid.) and Hortense-Coralie Devernay (née Lefebvre; 14 November 1857 in Roubaix). He began his musical studies at the Roubaix conservatoire where he obtained the First Prizes in solfège, piano, harmony and counterpoint in the class of Julien Koszul. He then joined the organ class of the Royal Conservatory of Brussels.

In 1912, the village of Trouville-sur-Mer opened auditions for the position of titular organist of the Notre-Dame-des-Victoires church; and he was appointed. He then came to settle in Normandy.

Wounded at Verdun during World War I, he composed his first symphony for organ: Marche pour la Victoire during his convalescence.

In 1931, he won the First Prize in musical composition of the SACEM for a lyrical drama, Au temps du bon Roy Henri.

He died in Trouville on 5 July 1952.

He was the uncle of Yves Devernay.

== Compositions ==
- Organ pieces
  - 2 Symphonies
  - 1 suite
  - Various pieces
- Pieces for piano
  - Cloches d'octobre
  - Cortège rustique des Moissonneurs
- Vocal works
  - Mass for 4 voices
  - Three poems by Baudelaire: Recueillement, Paysage, Brume et Pluie
  - Mélodies on verses by Albert Samain, Paul Verlaine, Théophile Gautier, Victor Hugo
- Opérettas:
  - Monette et ses cousins, Operetta in 3 acts on a libretto by Yvandré
  - le Soleil de Bali
- Lyrical:
  - Au temps du bon Roy Henri, lyrical drama in 1 act

== Discography ==
- Yves Devernay at the grandes orgues de la Cathédrale Notre-Dame de Paris - CD Mitra Digital Réf: 16 214: Miracle de la Tempête (Édouard Devernay)
- Édouard and Yves Devernay at Trouville - CD Phyllomène Réf.: 2010091507/1 - Nicole and Mathilde Marodon Cavaillé-Coll, Jacques Vandeville (organ, singing, oboe)

== Bibliography ==
- Athena sur la Touques n° 97 (Sept 1988): Trouville 1914. "Cahiers" written for his family during his stay at the military hospital of Lyon in November 1916.
- Athena sur la Touques n° 181 (Sept 2009) ISSN 0758-5470: Édouard Devernay, compositeur et organiste à Trouville (Claude Baumann)
