= Yves Devernay =

French organist, improviser and composer

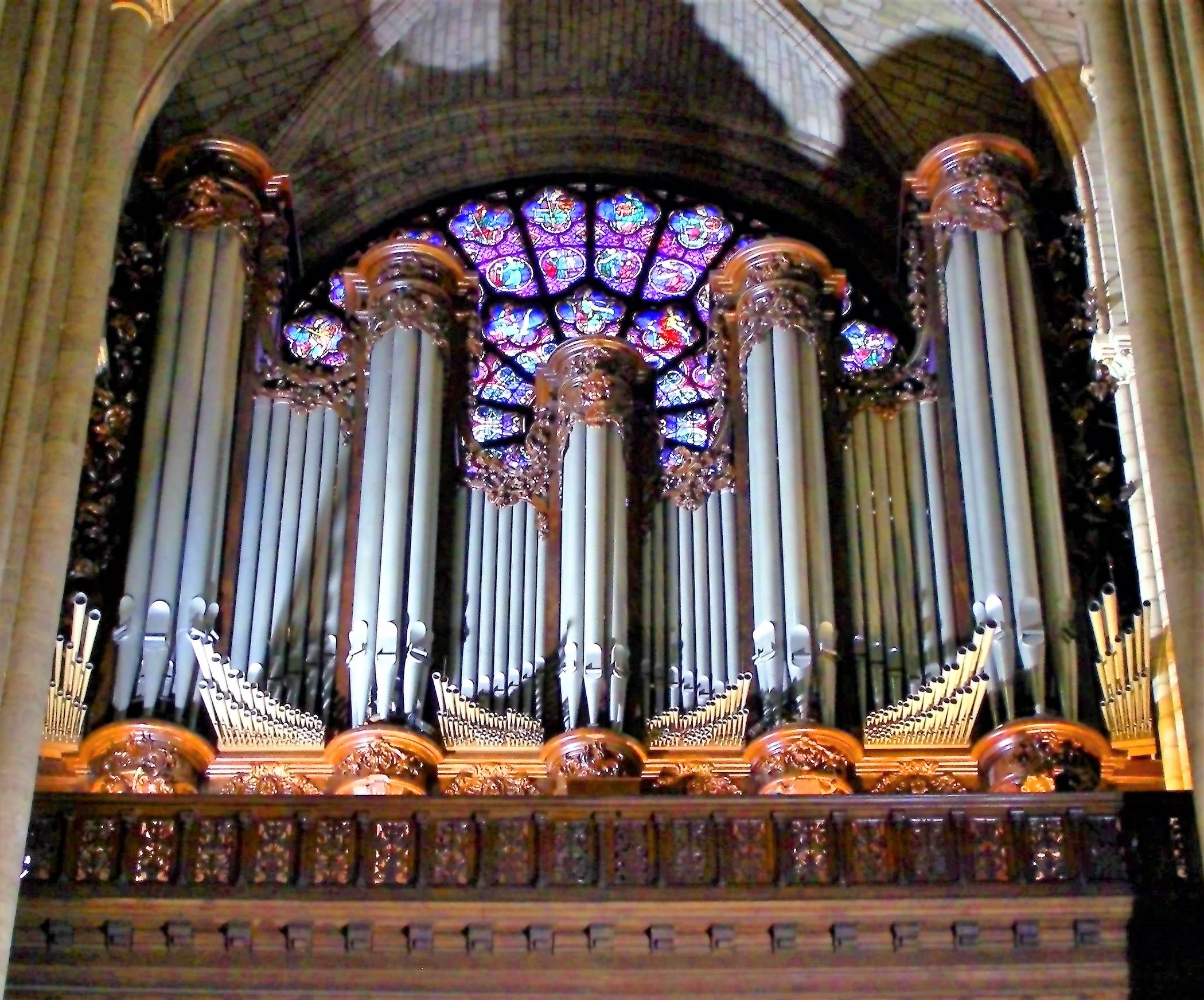
Grand organ of Notre-Dame de Paris

Yves Marie-Édouard Devernay (9 May 1937 – 10 December 1990) was a French organist, improviser and composer. He served as co-titular organist at Notre-Dame de Paris from 1984 to 1990 and was also acclaimed for a career of recitals.

== Biography ==
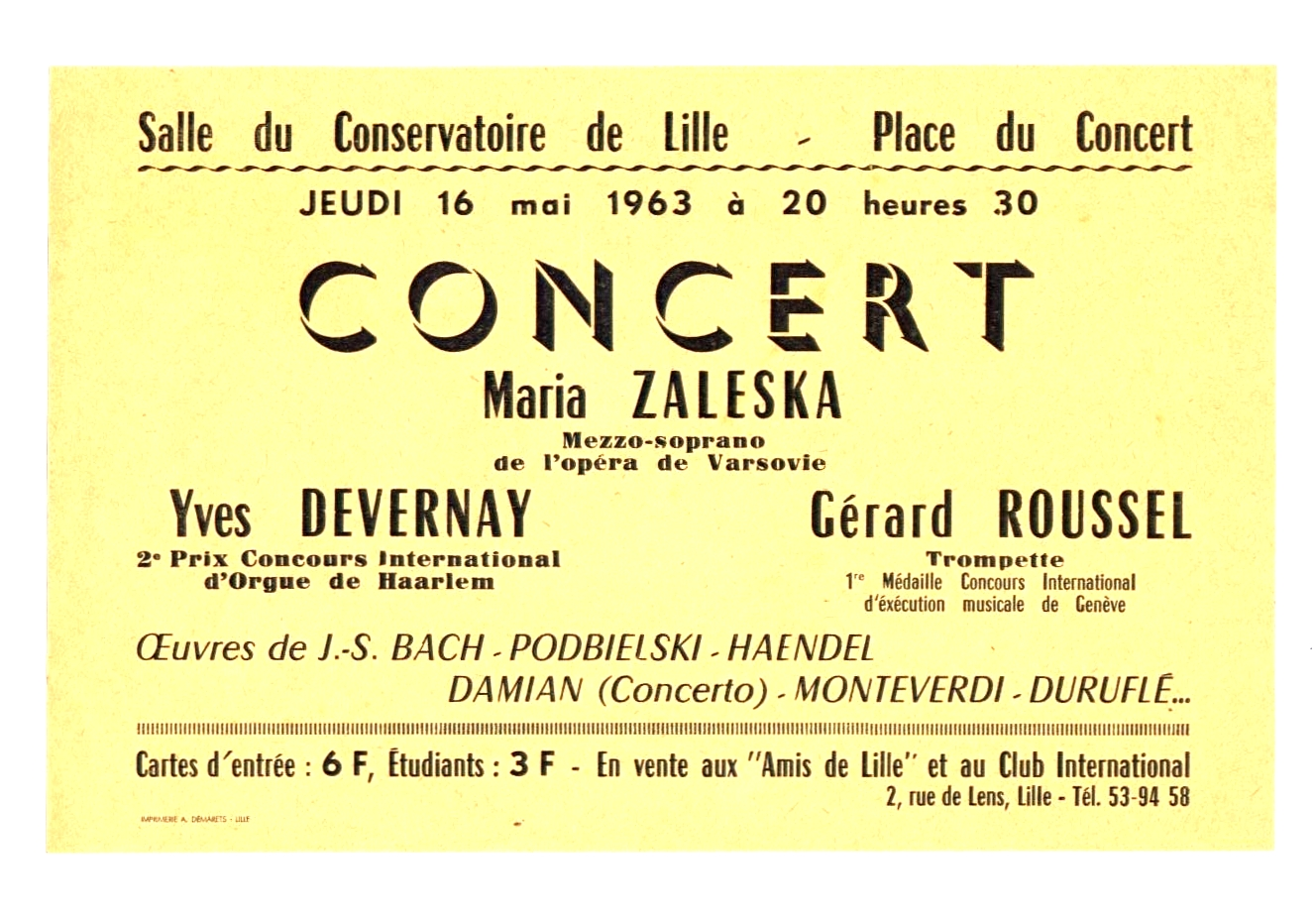
Leaflet announcing the concert of the Club International with Yves Devernay

A native of Tourcoing in Northern France, Yves Marie-Édouard Devernay was born on 9 May 1937 ino a Catholic family. He was the nephew of organist and composer Édouard Devernay (the organist of the Our Lady of Victories Church in Trouville-sur-Mer): his father, too, was an organist himself. These influences allowed the young Devernay to immerse himself in a musical household.

Following organ studies with Jeanne Joulain at the Roubaix conservatoire and a year studying in the Conservatoire de Lille, he joined Rolande Falcinelli's class at the Conservatoire de Paris in 1958. He won first prize in the organ class for 1961. Devernay also studied briefly with Marie-Claire Alain and won several international competitions, including the Grand Prix de Chartres in 1971, tied with Daniel Roth.

Devernay held the titular organist post at Saint Christopher's Church in his hometown from 1965 until his death. He would also be hired as professor of organ at the conservatories of Roubaix and Valenciennes.

Often acclaimed by critics, Devernay was renowned for his virtuosic technique, which was coupled with his talent for improvisation and musical intuition: he studied numerous styles (from Renaissance to jazz) and inspected numerous scores to imbibe their characters. He frequently practised the organ and piano to hone his talent, even doing so amidst quotidian affairs (such as reading a newspaper or sipping coffee).

Recognised for his reputation, he was appointed as one of four co-titular organists of the grand organ of Notre-Dame de Paris (alongside Olivier Latry, Philippe Lefèbvre, and Jean-Pierre Leguay) following the death of Pierre Cochereau. This skyrocketed his reputation; he performed numerous recitals across Europe.

Like his predecessor Cochereau, Devernay was an alcoholic and frequent smoker, but was also known for his optimistic extraversion, sense of humour, and congeniality - aiming to enliven as many people as possible by spreading music as a gift.

He died of a heart attack on 10 December 1990 in his hometown. On 10 December 2010, twentieth anniversary of his death, a plaque was affixed at the gates of Mouvaux Cemetery, where he rests.

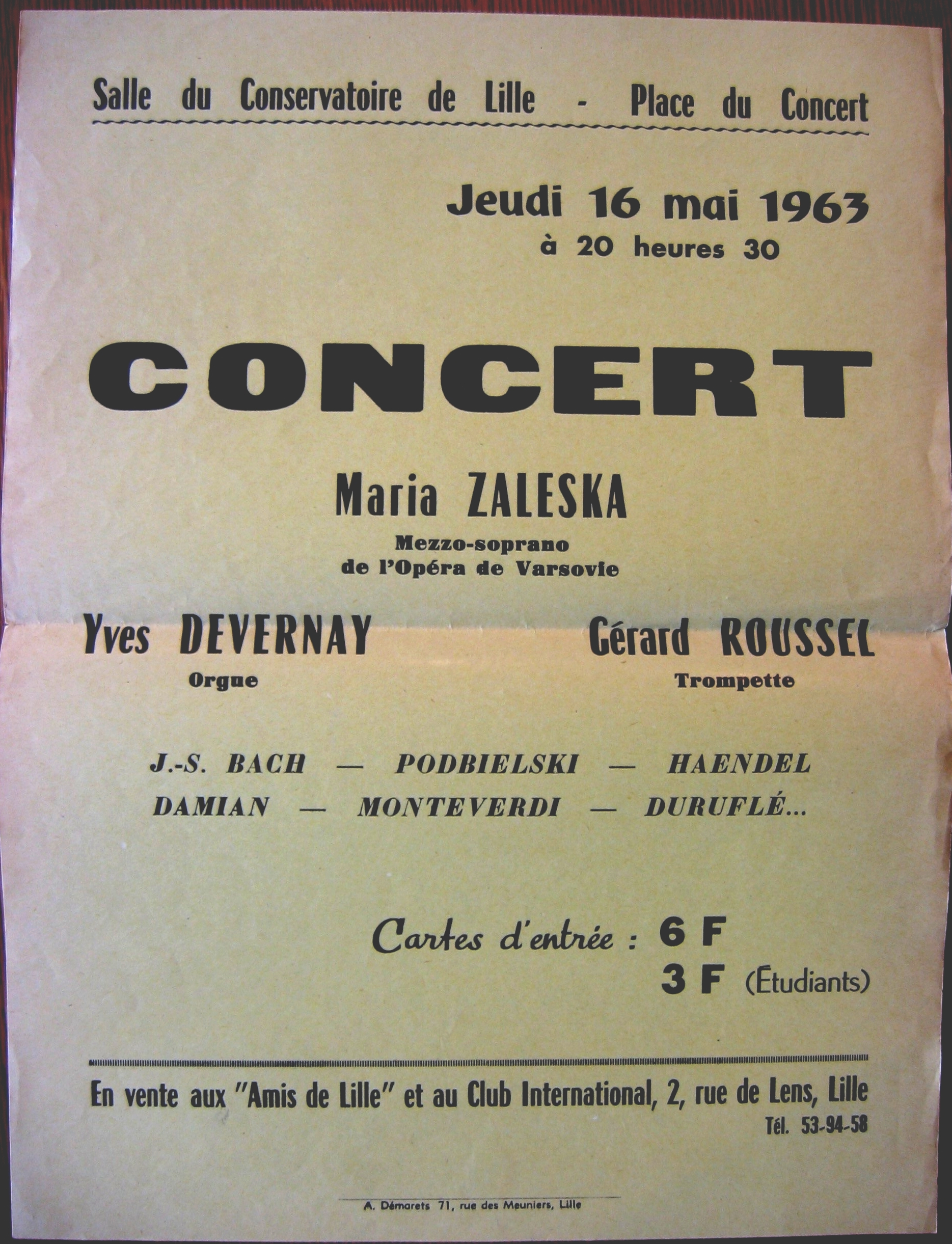
Poster for a concert where Devernay played organ, organised in Lille by Le Club International.

== Works ==
- Several pieces for choir and organ
- 2 concertos for organ and orchestra
- Ballade for oboe and organ
- Dialogue for piano and organ

== Bibliography ==
- In Mémoriam Yves Devernay (1937-1990), 98 pages, published by his friends
- Étienne Delahaye, À Saint-Christophe de Tourcoing avec Yves Devernay. L'Orgue, n° 290, 2010 – II.
- Étienne Delahaye, Yves Devernay (1937-1990). La passion au bout des doigts. Orgues Nouvelles, n°.23, winter 2014

== Discography ==
=== Hommage à Yves Devernay - Inauguration du Grand Orgue de Notre-Dame de Paris ===
"Homage to Yves Devernay - Inauguration of the Grand Organ of Notre-Dame de Paris"; released 4 December 1992 by Visual Communication (JM 003 ADD)

1. "Neoclassical" Improvisation (final voluntary to the vesper service on 24 January 1988)
2. Olivier Messiaen: Transports de joie (final voluntary of the 11 March 1990 mass)
3. Improvisation: Paraphrase on a Theme from Nabucco by Giuseppe Verdi (private concert on 31 March 1987)
4. Franz Liszt: Prelude and Fugue on the Theme B-A-C-H (final voluntary of the 20 March 1988 mass)

=== Yves Devernay aux grandes orgues de la cathédrale Notre-Dame de Paris ===
"Yves Devernay at the grand organ of the Notre-Dame de Paris Cathedral"; posthumously released by Mitra Digital (16214).

1. Charles-Marie Widor: Allegro vivace, opening movement of Symphony for Organ No. 5
2. Édouard Devernay: Le Miracle de la Tempête
3. Maurice Duruflé: Prélude et Fugue sur le nom d’Alain
4. Jean Guillou: Sinfonietta
5. Jean Langlais: Nazard, second movement of Suite française
6. Marcel Dupré: Variations sur un noël
7. Eugène Gigout: Toccata

=== Yves Devernay - Improvisations à Notre-Dame de Paris ===
"Yves Devernay - Improvisations at Notre-Dame de Paris"; released posthumously by Studio SM (D2892 SM 63), is a compilation of liturgical improvisations (introits, offertories, communions, recessionals, and versets).

| Preceded by Pierre Cochereau | Organist, Cathedrale Notre-Dame de Paris; 1985-1990 (appointed alongside Olivier Latry, Philippe Lefebvre and Jean-Pierre Leguay) | Succeeded by Olivier Latry, Philippe Lefebvre and Jean-Pierre Leguay |
