= Pierre Pincemaille =

French organist and pedagogue (1956–2018)

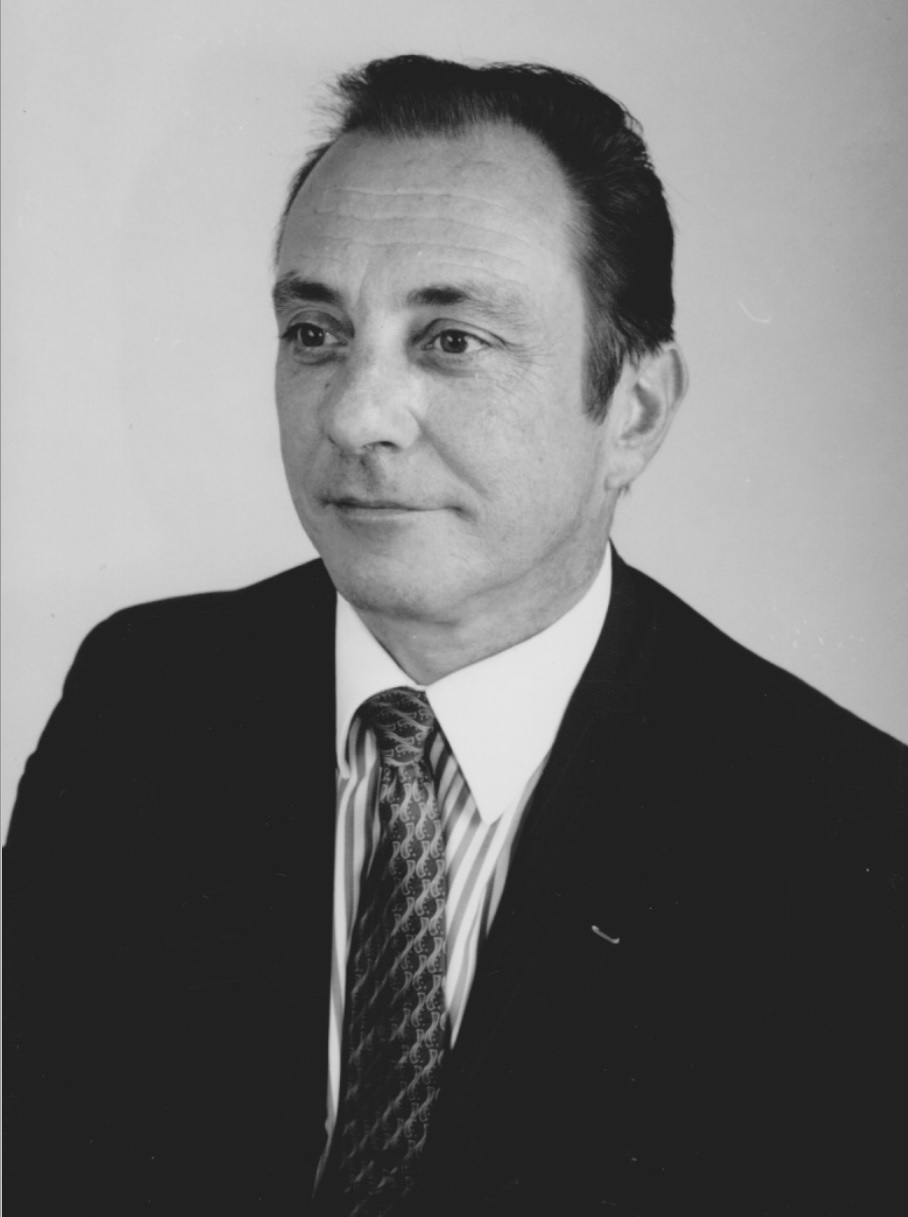
- Pierre Pincemaille, 2004

Background information
- Born: 8 December 1956; Paris 17e, France
- Died: 12 January 2018 (aged 61) Suresnes, France
- Genre: Classical
- Occupations: Improviser, organist, pedagogue
- Instrument: Organ
- Years active: 1973-2017
- Website: http://pierrepincemaille.fr/

Pierre-Marie François Pincemaille (8 December 1956 – 12 January 2018) was a French organist, improviser, and pedagogue. He was known for his organ improvisations, both in concert and on CD and for his recordings of Charles-Marie Widor's complete organ symphonies played on organs built by Aristide Cavaillé-Coll, as well as his recordings of the complete organ works of Maurice Duruflé and César Franck, and organ works of Pierre Cochereau and Louis Vierne in particular.

He was titular organist at the Basilica of Saint-Denis until his death and was regarded as one of the finest organists of his generation.

== Biography ==
Pincemaille was born in Paris' 17th arrondissement and began piano studies in 1965; in 1968, he started to study the organ. He graduated from the Paris Conservatory with five first prizes (in harmony, counterpoint, fugue, organ, and improvisation) and was taught by Henri Challan, Jean-Claude Raynaud, Marcel Bitsch and Rolande Falcinelli.

He was appointed titular organist at the Basilica of Saint-Denis in Saint-Denis (near Paris) in 1987. He was succeeded in June 2018 by his student Quentin Guérillot.

Between 1978 and 1990, he won five international organ competitions:

- 1978: First Prize at the Concours International d'Improvisation in Lyon
- 1987: Grand Prix at the Concours Européen d'Orgue in Beauvais
- 1989: First Prize at the Concours International d'Improvisation in Strasbourg
- 1989: Grand Prix at the Concours International d'Improvisation in Montbrison
- 1990: Grand Prix in improvisation at the Concours de Chartres

He was a professor of counterpoint at the Paris Conservatory, professor of organ improvisation at the Regional Conservatory in Saint-Maur-des-Fossés, and professor of harmony and counterpoint at the Regional Conservatory in Saint-Germain-en-Laye.

He is known to be a master of improvisation. As an improviser, he improvised during the ceremonies at the Basilica of Saint-Denis, and his recitals, in the tradition of French organ school.

As a composer, he has published an Ave Maria for mixed choir a cappella (Lyon: À coeur joie, 2013), En Louisiane for trombone and piano (Sampzon: Delatour France, 2004), and Prologue et Noël varié for organ (Sampzon: Delatour France, 2007). In November 2017, three motets (Pater Noster; Ave Maria; Ave Verum), published with A coeur joie editions received their premiere performance at the Basilica of St. Denis.

He gave more than 1000 concerts and recitals all around the world (France, Germany, Italy, Switzerland, Norway, Japan, Canada, USA, South Africa...).

He was Chevalier de l'Ordre des Palmes Académiques, Chevalier de l'Ordre des Arts et des Lettres, and Chevalier de l'Ordre de Saint-Grégoire-le-Grand.

Pincemaille died on 12 January 2018, at the local hospital in Suresnes, of lung cancer, aged 61. After his death, some events were given in memoriam, like concerts or radio broadcasts.

== Discography ==
Pierre Pincemaille recorded around twenty CDs, among which:

- Complete organ work of César Franck (Motette 12541)
- Complete organ work of Maurice Duruflé (Solstice SOCD 231–232)
- The 10 symphonies of Charles-Marie Widor (Solstice SOCD 181–185)
- Written work of Pierre Cochereau (Solstice SOCD 163)
- Youth work of Olivier Messiaen (IFO 00318/19))
- 8 CDs of improvisation

== Bibliography ==
- Völker, Elke: "Der Reiz perfekter Illusion. Ein Interview mit dem Pariser Organisten und Starimprovisator Pierre Pincemaille" (Organ – Journal für die Orgel 1, no. 1 (1998): 18–21).
- Pincemaille, Pierre: L'improvisateur à Notre-Dame. In: Pierre Cochereau: Témoignages, ed. Yvette Carbou. Bourg-la-Reine: Zurfluh, 1999, 271–339. ISBN 2-87750-087-X.
- Pincemaille, Pierre: L'improvisateur à Notre-Dame. In: Pierre Cochereau: Un art d'illusioniste, ed. Yvette Carbou. Sampzon: Delatour France, 2014, 263–338. ISBN 978-2-7521-0124-2.

Pierre Pincemaille was also involved in the DVD "The genius of Cavaille Coll" (BBC Music Magazine Awards 2014).
