= Suzanne Chaisemartin =

French organist

Suzanne Henriette Madeleine Chaisemartin (7 February 1921 - 8 July 2017) was a French church and concert organist and pedagogue who was often considered to be one of the best organists of her generation.

== Life ==
Born in Choisy-le-Roi to Jean, an architect father; and Madeleine (née Célerier), a pianist mother, she received initial instruction in piano from her older sister (who received the First Prize in piano in Yves Nat's class). She continued with Madame Chaumont, while obtaining a 1st medal in solfège in Madame Massait's class at the Conservatoire de Paris.

She was introduced to Marcel Dupré in 1939, and she studied privately with him before winning a first prize for organ and improvisation at the Conservatoire in Paris in 1947.

As soon as she finished her studies, Chaisemartin began a career as a concert performer, which took her all over Europe and the United States. She gave more than 900 organ recitals, and also received an appointment as a soloist at Radio France.

In 1949 she was appointed as titular organist of the grand Barker/Cavaillé-Coll organ of the Église Saint-Augustin de Paris, succeeding André Fleury, she was appointed an honorary fellow after her retirement in 1997.

At the beginning of her career, she served as a substitute organist for Dupré, who often went on concerts around France and the world, at his organ at Saint-Sulpice in Paris.

After serving as a substitute from 1955 to 1971 for Rolande Falcinelli at the Conservatoire de Paris, she became an assistant professor from until 1986. She also taught at the École normale de musique de Paris (1956) and the Conservatoire de Dijon from 1971 to 1989.

Chaisemartin died in Paris at the age of 96.

== Awards ==
- Chevalier of the Legion of Honour
- Chevalier of the National Order of Merit
- Officier of the Ordre des Arts et des Lettres
- Chevalier of the Ordre des Palmes académiques

== Discography ==
Chaisemartin has made numerous recordings devoted mainly to Bach, Mendelssohn, Schumann, Liszt, Brahms, Guilmant, Widor, Gigout, Dupré and Langlais.

== Sources ==
- Pierre-François Dub-Attenti and Hubert Bouet, "Suzanne Chaisemartin : interprète et pédagogue", L'Orgue, n°294/2011, (100 p.)
- Pâris, Alain (1995). interprétation musicale au XXe siècle. Bouquins8064-1 (in French). Paris: Éditions Robert Laffont. ISBN 2-221-08064-5. OCLC 34515574.
