= Jean-Pierre Leguay =

French organist, composer and improviser (born 1939)

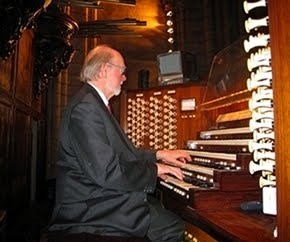
Jean-Pierre Leguay at Notre-Dame de Paris

Jean-Pierre Leguay (born 4 July 1939 in Dijon) is a French organist, composer and improviser. On 1 January 2013, he became a Chevalier (Knight) of the Legion of Honour, the most prestigious French national order of merit.

== Career ==
He studied with André Marchal, Gaston Litaize, Rolande Falcinelli (organ), Simone Plé-Caussade (counterpoint), and Olivier Messiaen (composition), before serving as titular organist at Notre-Dame-des-Champs, Paris from 1961 to 1984. In 1985 he was named a titular organist at the Cathedral of Notre-Dame de Paris, alongside Olivier Latry, Yves Devernay and Philippe Lefebvre. He held this position through the end of 2015, and is now titular organist emeritus.

From 1968 to 1989, he taught organ, improvisation (both single and in ensemble) at the Conservatoire à rayonnement régional de Limoges (and music history until 1986), and at the Conservatoire National de Région de Dijon from 1989 to 2003. He has also been in charge of improvisation courses in Paris at the Centre d’Action Liturgique et Musical (1985-1988) and at the Conservatoire Erik Satie du 7e arrondissement.

Recognized as a concert organist, composer and improviser—not only at the organ, but also as a pianist and in ensemble—Jean-Pierre Leguay pursues a triple career throughout Europe, Canada, the United States, and Asia. He has been invited to appear by radio networks, academies, universities and conservatories in France and overseas.

Constantly exploring the “alchemy of sound,” the composer’s catalog comprises more than seventy works for various instrumental and vocal ensembles, including Etoilé (harpsichord and quintet), Sève (alto saxophone and piano), Souffle (fourteen instruments), Azur (piano), Aube (organ and chamber orchestra), Cendres d’ailes (tenor and piano) and a string trio and quartet. His principal publishers are Billaudot, Lemoine, Universal, and Symétrie. He has received commissions from the Ministère de la Culture, Radio France, Conservatoire National Supérieur de Musique de Paris, the Concours International de Chartres, Musique Sacrée à Notre-Dame de Paris, the Scottish Arts Council of Edinburgh, the Festival de Música Española de Léon and the Festival de La Massana (Andorra).

Jean-Pierre Leguay’s numerous recordings span repertory from the 17th- to the 21st century. Several CDs are devoted to his own compositions and improvisations. He improvised much of the music for the film Les Mystères des Cathédrales directed by Jean-François Delassus for ARTE television and Les Editions Montparnasse. The recording of his Missa Deo Gratias and his Sonates II and III were recognized with a “Choc” award from Le Monde de la Musique magazine. His most recent CD of improvisations at Notre-Dame Cathedral recently received the Preis der Deutschen Schallplattenkritik.

== Awards ==
He has won many awards for organ, improvisation (organ and piano) and composition at the Conservatoire National Supérieur de Musique de Paris, in addition to international competitions in Lyon, Nice, Haarlem, and Erding.

== Compositions ==
- 2023 - A deux pour Vibraphone et piano (14'30 min)
- 2022 - Le matin sûrement va venir (Version 2), pour Ondes Martenot, piano, percussions (1 exécutant, 22 min)
- 2022 - Momenti, pour piano (14 min)
- 2020 - Le matin sûrement va venir (Version I), pour saxophone alto, piano, percussions (23 min)
- 2020 - Envol pour piano (11 min)
- 2019 - Allegramente pour clarinette et orgue (17 min)
- 2019 - Mouvement 60 pour soprano ou ténor et piano -(6 min)
- 2018 - Ramure pour chœur et orgue (7 min)
- 2018 - Sonate V pour orgue - 23 (min)
- 2017 - Chant pour Inès pour piano (3’30 min)
- 2017 - Jubilus pour flûte et petite flûte, hautbois et cor anglais, clarinette en sib et clarinette basse en sib, violon, piano, percussions (13 min)
- 2016 - Capite Silentium pour hautbois solo et chœur mixte (15'30 min)
- 2015-2016 - Missa Laudamus Te pour chœur et orgue (21'30 min)
- 2014-2016 - Sonate IV pour orgue (23 min)
- 2015 - Chant pour Gabriel pour piano (5 min)
- 2012-2014 - Sonnantes pour piano à quatre mains (15 min)
- 2014 - Rivages pour orgue (11 min)
- 2013 - Du fond de l'abîme (Motet de Carême) - chœur à deux voix égales (enfants ou femmes) et orgue (3 min)
- 2013 - Chemin faisant pour orgue (11 min)
- 2012 - Et il chante l'aurore, pour orgue (10 min)
- 2010-2011 - Allume l'aube dans la source, pour piano (26 min)
- 2010 - Brève II, pour orgue (5:40 min)
- 2009-2010 - Cendre d'ailes, pour voix de ténor et piano sur des poèmes d'Henri Michaux (27 min)
- 2008 - Et puis, et puis encore ?, pour orgue (24 min)
- 2006 - Cinq reflets, pour orgue (15 min)
- 2005-2006 - Sonate III, pour orgue (23:30 min)
- 2004 - Péan IV, pour orgue (12 min)
- 2003-2004 - Sept pièces brèves, pour flûte et orgue (14:50 min)
- 2001 - Alleluia, pour ténor avec ou sans orgue (4:30 min)
- 2000-2001 - Pater Noster, pour ténor avec ou sans orgue (5 min)
- 2000 - Brève, pour orgue (3:30 min)
- 1999-2000 - Missa Deo Gratias, pour soprano solo, chœur mixte, un ou deux orgues, cuivres et percussion (30 min)
- 1999 - Secundum Matthaeum, pour ténor et orgue (20 min)
- 1998 - Trois esquisses, pour flûte avec ou sans piano (5:30 min)
- 1996-97 - Psaume XXI, pour sextuor vocal a capella (21 min)
- 1995 - Animato, pour orgue (3:45 min)
- 1995 - Horizon, pour orgue (12 min)
- 1992-1993 - Spicilège, pour orgue (35 min)
- 1990-1991 - Azur, pour piano (23 min)
- 1990 - Capriccio, pour orgue (10 min)
- 1989-1995 - Quatuor, pour quatuor à cordes (20 min)
- 1989-1990 - Chant, pour choeur de femmes et percussion (17 min)
- 1988 - Madrigal IX, pour orgue (10 min)
- 1987 - Granit (Version II), pour 2 trompettes, 2 trombones et orgue (16 min)
- 1986 - Prélude I, pour guitare (2:40 min)
- 1986 - Chant d'airain, pour trombone ténor (11 min)
- 1986-1989 - Madrigal VIII, pour percussions (20 min)
- 1986 - Vigiles, pour choeur, orgue, trombone, percussions (70 min)
- 1986 - Aube, pour orgue positif et orchestre de chambre (18 min)
- 1985-1986 - Cinq pièces pour alto, contrebasse, percussions (13 min)
- 1985 - Madrigal VII, pour orgue (8:30 min)
- 1985 - Madrigal VI, pour 4 saxophones (10 min)
- 1984 - Souffle, pour 14 instrumentistes (22 min)
- 1983-1984 - Scabbs, pour saxophone alto et contrebasse ou saxophone baryton (5:30 min)
- 1983 - Madrigal V, pour orgue (11:30 min)
- 1982-1983 - Sonate II, pour orgue (23 min)
- 1982 - Madrigal IV, pour guitare (10 min)
- 1982 - Prélude XXIII, pour orgue (9:30 min)
- 1982 - Madrigal III, pour clavecin ou orgue positif (12 min)
- 1981 - Etoilé pour clavecin ou orgue positif et 5 instrumentistes (21 min)
- 1980 - Prélude XXII, pour orgue (1 min)
- 1980 - Prélude XXI, pour orgue (6:30 min)
- 1980 - Préludes XX, pour orgue (3:30 min)
- 1979 - Madrigal II, pour orgue (7 min)
- 1979 - Madrigal I, pour 4 trombones (8 min)
- 1978 - Trio pour violon, alto et violoncelle (22 min)
- 1977 - Le matin sûrement va venir, pour Ondes Martenot, piano, percussions (22 min)
- 1976 - Job, pour choeur de femmes et orgue (17 min)
- 1965-1975 - XIX Préludes, pour orgue (46 min)
- 1975 - Granit (Version I), pour 4 trombones et orgue (14 min)
- 1974 - Sève, pour saxophone et piano (14 min)
- 1973-1974 - Sonate I pour orgue (10 min)
- 1973 - Flamme, pour hautbois ou saxophone alto
- 1972 - Angle, pour deux harpes (8 min)
- 1972 - Hexagonal, pour flûte et orgue (12 min)
- 1971-1972 - Péan III, pour orgue (10 min)
- 1970-1971 - Péan II, pour trompette et orgue (11 min)
- 1969-1970 - Aurore pour flûte, hautbois, violoncelle et harpe (12 min)
- 1969 - Gitanjâli pour grand orchestre (10 min)
- 1968-2010 - Péan I pour orgue, 3 trombones, marimba, percussions (19 min)
- 1967 - Sextuor pour flûte, hautbois, clarinette, cor, basson, piano (14 min)
- 1965 - Cinq versets sur Veni Creator pour orgue (5 min)
- 1963-1964 - Au Maître de la Paix pour orgue (15 min)
- 1961 - Prélude, trio de timbres, fugato pour orgue (11 min)
- 1959-1960 - Cinq Esquisses pour piano et orgue (12 min)
