= Albert Samain =

French poet (1858–1900)

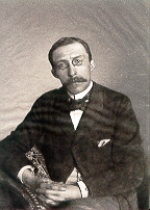
Albert Samain

Albert Victor Samain (3 April 1858 – 18 August 1900) was a French poet and writer of the Symbolist school.

== Life and works ==
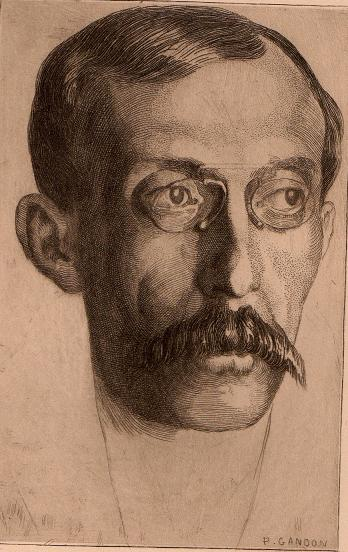
Albert Samain drawn by Paul Gandon

Born in Lille, his family were Flemish and had long lived in the town or its suburbs. At the time of the poet's birth, his father, Jean-Baptiste Samain, and his mother, Elisa-Henriette Mouquet, conducted a business in "wines and spirits" at 75 rue de Paris. Samain's father died when he was quite young; it was necessary for him to leave school and seek a trade. He moved to Paris in around 1880, where his poetry won him a following and he began mixing with avant-garde literary society, and began publicly reciting his poems at Le Chat Noir. His poems were strongly influenced by those of Baudelaire, and began to strike a somewhat morbid and elegiac tone. He also was influenced by Verlaine; his works disclose a taste for indecisive, vague imagery. Samain helped found the Mercure de France, and also worked on the Revue des Deux Mondes.

Samain published three volumes of verse: Au Jardin de l'Infante (1893), which made him famous; Aux flancs du vase (1898) and Le Chariot d'or (1901). His poetic drama Polyphème was set to music by Jean Cras. Samain died of tuberculosis.

== Musical settings ==
Many composers set Samain's poetry to music, including Lili Boulanger, Nadia Boulanger, Alfredo Casella, Édouard Devernay, George Enescu, Gabriel Fauré, Swan Hennessy, Charles Koechlin, Jacques Leguerney, Adela Maddison, Georges Migot, Paul Paray, Ottorino Respighi, Adrien Rougier, Camille Saint-Saëns, Alice Sauvrezis, Marcelle Soulage, and others.

== Quotation ==
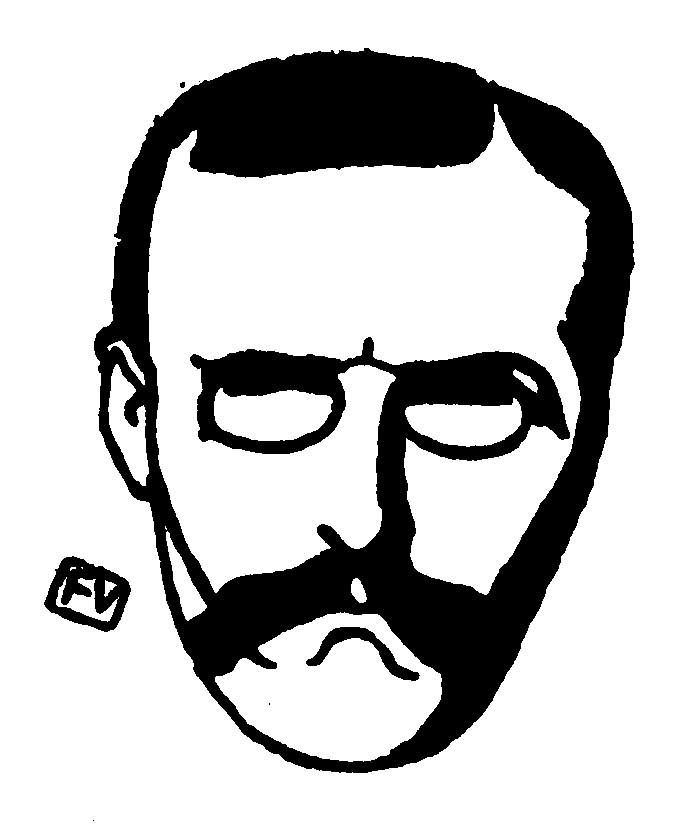
Portrait d'Albert Samain par Félix Vallotton (1896).

Je rêve de vers doux et d'intimes ramages,
De vers à frôler l'âme ainsi que des plumages,

De vers blonds où le sens fluide se délie
Comme sous l'eau la chevelure d'Ophélie,

De vers silencieux, et sans rythme et sans trame
Où la rime sans bruit glisse comme une rame,

De vers d'une ancienne étoffe, exténuée,
Impalpable comme le son et la nuée,

De vers de soir d'automne ensorcelant les heures
Au rite féminin des syllabes mineures.

De vers de soirs d'amour énervés de verveine,
Où l'âme sente, exquise, une caresse à peine...

Je rêve de vers doux mourant comme des roses.

--Au Jardin de l'Infante
