= Rolande Falcinelli =

French organist, composer & educator (1920–2006)

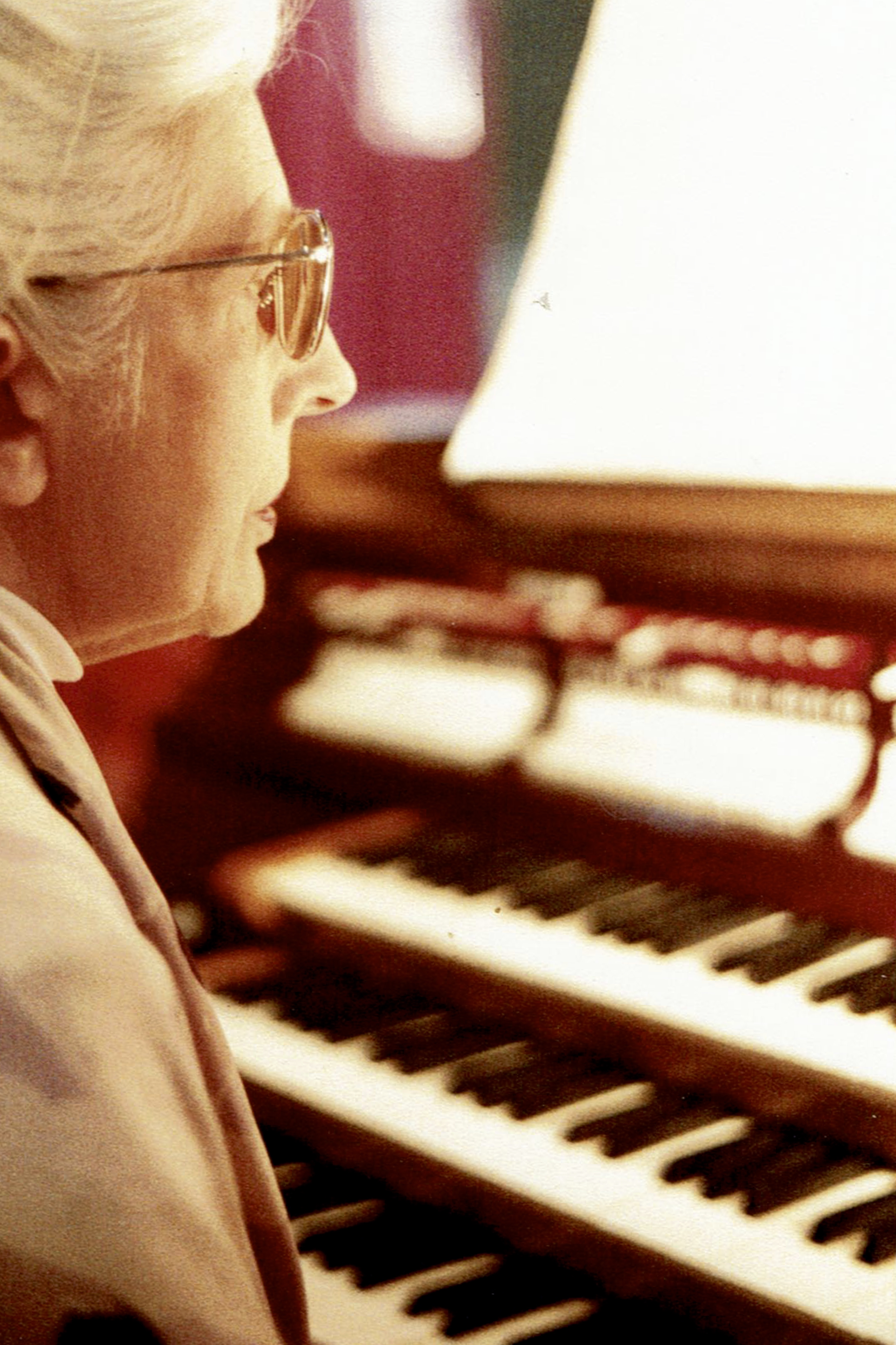
- Rolande Falcinelli

Background information
- Born: Rolande Roberte Ginabat-Falcinelli; 18 February 1920; Paris, France
- Died: 11 June 2006 (aged 86) Pau, France
- Occupations: Organist; Pianist; Composer; Music educator
- Instruments: Organ; Piano; Harpsichord
- Award: Second Grand Prix de Rome (1942)

Rolande Roberte Ginabat-Falcinelli (18 February 1920 – 11 June 2006) was a French organist, pianist, composer, and music educator.

== Biography ==
Rolande Falcinelli (born Ginabat), the grandniece of Marcel Falcinelli and granddaughter of Louis Napoléon Falcinelli (both painters), was born in Paris and entered the Conservatoire de Paris in 1932, where her teachers were noted pianist and pedagogue Isidor Philipp and Abel Estyle (piano), Marcel Samuel-Rousseau (harmony), Simone Plé-Caussade (counterpoint), Henri Büsser (composition), and Marcel Dupré (organ and improvisation). In 1942, she received the second Grand Prix de Rome in composition.

From 1946 to 1973, she was titular organist at Sacré-Cœur in Paris. She was succeeded by her student Daniel Roth. Additionally, she taught organ at the American Conservatory in Fontainebleau from 1948 to 1955, and at the École Normale de Musique in Paris from 1948 to 1955.

In 1948, at Salle Pleyel in Paris, Rolande Falcinelli performed from memory the (then) complete organ works of Marcel Dupré, whose music was in the center of her interests throughout her career as a performer and teacher.

In 1955, she succeeded Dupré as professor of organ and improvisation at the Paris Conservatory, where she taught until 1987. Among her numerous students were many organists, such as Patrice Caire, Sophie-Véronique Cauchefer-Choplin, Francis Chapelet, Maurice Clerc, Xavier Darasse, Yves Devernay, Marie-Bernadette Dufourcet, Pierre Gazin, Naji Hakim, André Isoir, Philippe Lefebvre, Jean-Pierre Leguay, Odile Pierre, Pierre Pincemaille, Louis Robilliard, Daniel Roth, Yves Castagnet and Louis Thiry.

In addition to her numerous organ compositions, she wrote works for piano, harpsichord, solo instruments, orchestra, choir and songs. She also made numerous recordings, including several LPs with compositions of Marcel Dupré at the Auditorium Marcel Dupré in Meudon.

Rolande Falcinelli died on 11 June 2006, at age 86, in Pau, in the Pyrénées-Atlantiques department of France. From her marriage with Felix Ludwig Otto, a producer from Norddeutscher Rundfunk in Hamburg, Germany, she had a daughter, Sylviane (born 1956), a musicologist.

== Compositions ==
=== Organ solo ===
- Triptyque op. 11 (composed 1941. Paris: Bornemann/Leduc, 1982):
  - Litanies
  - Rondel
  - Fugue
- Épigraphe funèbre op. 21. In memoriam Jean-Claude Touche (composed 1944. Sampzon: Éditions Delatour France)
- Nocturne féerique op. 23b (Organ Transcription 1946, unpublished)
- Petit Livre de Prières op. 24 (composed 1946. Paris: Bornemann/Leduc, 1948):
  - À St. Dominique
  - À Notre Père
  - À Notre Seigneur Jésus-Christ
  - Au St. Esprit
  - À la Très Sainte Trinité
  - Au Cœur Sacré de Jésus
  - À Sainte Thérèse de l'Enfant Jésus
  - Ora pro nobis, Amen
- Poèmes-Études op. 26 (composed 1948–60, unpublished):
  - Danse éternelle de Lasksmi
  - La Guitare enchantée
  - Troïka
  - Scaramuccio
- 5 Chorals sur l'Antienne di Magnificat du Saint-Sacrement op. 28 (composed 1950–51. Paris: Bornemann/Leduc, 1952):
  - O sacrum convivium! in quo Christus sumitur...
  - Recolitur memoria passionis ejus
  - Mens impletur gratia
  - Et futurae gloriae nobis pignus datur
  - Alleluja
- Rosa mystica sur sept thèmes grégoriens à la Vierge op. 29 (composed 1951. Paris: Éditions de la Schola Cantorum)
- Poème en forme d'improvisation op. 31 (composed 1953. Mainz: Schott, 2007)
- Prélude à l'Introït de la Messe du Sacré-Cœur op. 34 (composed 1956. Paris: Éditions de la Schola Cantorum)
- Cor Jesu sacratissimum op. 36 (composed 1958. Paris: Éditions musicales transatlantiques, 1966)
- Messe pour la Fête du Christ-Roi op. 38 (composed 1959–60. Paris: Éditions de la Schola Cantorum):
  - Choral-Prélude à l'Introït de la Messe de Christ-Roi
  - Offertoire pour la Fête de Christ-Roi
  - Élevation
  - Communion pour la Fête de Christ-Roi
- Morceau in D minor without Opus (composed 1960, unpublished)
- La Cathédrale de l'Âme op. 39 (composed 1962–72. Sampzon: Éditions Delatour France):
  - Portail
  - Réflexion
  - Méditation
  - Concentration
  - Affirmation
  - Initiation
  - Contemplation
  - Adoration
  - Communion
  - Sanctum Sanctorum
- Cortège funèbre: Sortie pour la Messe des morts op. 41 (composed 1965. Paris: Éditions de la Schola Cantorum)
- Intermezzo in G major without Opus (composed 1965, unpublished)
- Prophétie d'après Ezechiel: Poème pour orgue op. 42 (composed 1959–66. Paris: Éditions musicales transatlantiques, 1975)
- Salve Regina op. 43 (composed 1968. Paris: Bornemann/Leduc, 1969)
- 14 Études insérées dans l'Initiation à l'orgue (composed 1969–70. Paris: Bornemann/Leduc, 1971):
  - Étude no. 1 - Dialogue
  - Veni Créator
  - Étude no. 2 - Chanson
  - Variations sur un Rondeau d'Adam de la Halle
  - Étude no. 3 - Intermezzo
  - Étude no. 4 - Mélodie
  - Étude no. 5 - Récitatif
  - Étude no. 6 - Choral (pour l'Ascension)
  - Étude no. 7 - Prélude (pour la Pentecôte)
  - Étude no. 8 - Trio
  - Étude no. 9 - Fughetta
  - Étude no. 10 - Mouvement perpétuel
  - Étude no. 11 - Ricercare
  - Étude no. 12 - Toccata
- Esquisses symphoniques en forme des variations op. 45 (composed 1971. Sampzon: Éditions Delatour France):
  - Largo sostenuto
  - Adagio espressivo
  - Allegro marcato
  - Grave
  - Allegretto leggiero
  - Larghetto
  - Allegretto giocoso
  - Allegro recitativo
  - Andante molto moderato
  - Allegro ritmico
- Le Sermon sur la montagne op. 46. Poème mystique d'après l'Évangile selon Saint Matthieu (composed 1972. Mainz: Schott, 2007)
- Variations-Études sur une Berceuse op. 48 (composed 1972–73. Paris: Combre, 1982)
- Mathnavi d'après le poème mystique d'Ibrahim Arâqî op. 50 (composed 1973. Paris: Bornemann/Leduc, 1974)
- Miniatures persanes op. 52 (composed 1974. Sampzon: Éditions Delatour France):
  - Moburati-Bâd
  - Monâdjat
  - Qalandar
  - Zurkhâné
- Épure op. 67 No. 1 (composed 1983. Paris: Combre, 1983)
- Méandres op. 67 No. 2 (composed 1983. Paris: Combre, 1983)
- Missa Brevissima op. 69 (composed 1956–1985. Paris: Editions de la Schola Cantorum):
  - Prélude à l'Introït
  - Offertoire
  - Élévation
  - Communion
  - Deo Gratias (unpublished)
- Sonatina per Scherzare op. 73 (composed 1988. Éditions Lisset):
  - Tempo di Valser
  - Tempo di Marcia
  - Tempo di Barcarola
  - Tempo di Rondo

=== Organ with other instruments or voice ===
- Choral et Variation sur le Kyrie de la Messe "Orbis Factor" for organ and orchestra op. 12 (composed 1942, unpublished)
- Nocturne féérique for organ, 2 pianos, 2 harps, celesta, and percussion op. 23 (composed 1946, unpublished)
- 4 Motets à la Vierge for voice and organ op. 37 (composed 1959):
  - Ego lilium convallium for soprano, baryton, mixed choir SATB and organ (Rome: AISC)
  - Regina Cæli Lætare for soprano, female choir (three voices) and organ (Rome: AICS)
  - Tota Pulchra es for soprano or tenor and organ (manuscript lost)
  - Virgo Mater Filia for medium voice and organ (manuscript lost)
- Mausolée "à la gloire de Marcel Dupré" for organ and orchestra op. 47 (composed 1971–72, orchestration 1973, Debuted 3/25/2011 at Sacred Heart Cathedral, Rochester, NY for the Eastman School of Music "Women in Music Festival" Organist: Timothy Tikker Accompanied by: University of Rochester Symphonic Orchestra conducted by Dr. David Harman):
  - Prélude
  - Fugue
  - Choral
- Chant de peine et de lutte for violin and organ op. 53 (composed 1974. Sampzon: Éditions Delatour France)
- 3 Chants profanes for voice and organ op. 55 (1974–75, unpublished):
  - Aurore d'hiver (G. Apollinaire)
  - Ronsard à son âme (P. Ronsard)
  - Lumière, ma Lumière! (R. Tagore)
- Canzon per sonar for 2 violas and organ op. 57 (composed 1975, unpublished)
- Le Mystère de la Sainte-Messe for two organs op. 59 (composed 1976–82, unpublished):
  - Introïtus, Kyrie eleison, Gloria, Evangelio
  - Credo, Offertorium, Sanctus, Elevatio
  - Pater Noster, Agnus Dei, Communio, Ite missa est
- Tétrade for viola and organ op. 60 (composed 1976, unpublished)
- Azân for flute and organ op. 61 (composed 1977. Éditions Hortus, 2008)
- Quand sonnera le glas for voice and organ op. 62 (composed 1978, unpublished)
- Psaume XIII for baritone and organ op. 63 (composed 1978, unpublished)
- Aphorismes for piano and organ op. 64 (composed 1979–80, unpublished)
- Kénose for cello and organ op. 68 (composed 1983. Sampzon: Éditions Delatour France, 2006)

=== Piano solo ===
- D'une âme...: poème varié en dix chants enchaînes op. 15 (composed 1942. Éditions Lisset):
  - Indécise
  - ...Triste
  - Insouciante
  - Ardente...
  - Tendre...
  - Inquiète...
  - Moqueuse...
  - Rêveuse...
  - Orageuse...
  - Apaisée...
- Jeu d'un Biquet op. 30 (composed 1953, unpublished)
- Harmonies et lignes: Huit petites pièces op. 32 (composed 1955. Paris: Leduc, 1955):
  - Choral et Invention
  - Litanies et Invention
  - Aria et Invention
  - Sarabande et Invention
- Mémorial Mozart: Suite pour piano or harpsichord op. 35 (composed 1955–56, unpublished):
  - Préambule
  - Ricercar
  - Gavotte
  - Récitatif
  - Toccata
- Berceuse in E-flat major for piano or organ, without Opus (composed 1956, unpublished)
- Chanson in D major without Opus (composed 1959, unpublished)
- Chaconne in G minor without Opus (composed 1959, unpublished)
- Résonances poétiques op. 40 (composed 1964–65, unpublished):
  - Recueillement
  - Campane
  - Rochers
  - Fontaine
  - Brumes
  - Arondes
  - Neige
  - Flammes
- Pochades op. 44 (composed 1971, unpublished):
  - Dédicace
  - Nébulosité
  - Six gouttes d'eau
  - Câline

=== Chamber music ===
- Prélude et Scherzo for septet op. 3 (composed 1939, unpublished)
- Suite fantaisiste for violin and piano op. 6 (composed 1940, unpublished):
  - Fantoches
  - Chanson tchèque
  - Epitaphe
  - Petit soldat
  - Berceuse
  - Lucioles
- String Quartet op. 9 (composed 1940, unpublished):
  - Large et très expressif
  - Scherzo
  - Modéré
  - Variations
- La Messiade op. 10b (Piano Reduction 1941–42, unpublished)
- Cecca, la Bohémienne ensorcelée op. 22b (Piano Reduction 1943–45, unpublished)
- Berceuse for bassoon and piano op. 33 (composed 1956, unpublished)
- Gavotte in E minor for harpsichord, without Opus (composed 1956, unpublished)
- Morceau for oboe and piano, without Opus (composed 1958, unpublished)
- Arietta (Andante quasi adagio) in E minor for harpsichord, without Opus (composed 1958, unpublished)
- Quatrains d'Omar Khayyam for soprano, bariton and string quartet op. 51 (composed 1973, unpublished):
  - Amis! ...Souvenez-vous... (Bariton solo)
  - On ne sait pour quel motif... (Soprano solo)
  - Avant toi et moi (Soprano and Bariton)
  - Puisque le Seigneur n'a pas voulu... (Soprano solo)
- Résonances romantiques for harpsichord op. 54 (composed 1973–75, inédit):
  - Solitudes
  - Rêves
  - Rencontres mystérieuses
  - Clairs-obscurs
  - Confidences
  - Dialogues
  - Pluie de lumière
- Chant d'ombre et de clarté for cello solo op. 56 (composed 1975. Sampzon: Éditions Delatour France)
- Inventions for harpsichord op. 58 (composed 1976. Paris: Les Éditions Ouvrières, 1976):
  - Prélude
  - Litanie
  - Variations
  - Ricercar
  - Rondinetto
  - Danse
- Krishna-Gopala for flute solo op. 66 (composed 1985. Paris: Leduc, 1985)
- Récurrence for viola and piano op. 70 (écrit 1986. Paris: Billaudot)
- Sine nomine for viola and piano op. 71 (composed 1987. Lyon: Symétrie)
- Trinomio for Oboe or English Horn op. 72 (Sampzon: Éditions Delatour France):
  - Preliminare (English Horn)
  - ...Fugato il contrappunto delle voci... (Oboe)
  - ...e piccole variazioni (starting with Oboe, later switching to English Horn)
- Morceau (Lent) in F minor for harpsichord, without Opus (undated, unpublished)

=== Piano and orchestra ===
- Polska: Suite sur des thèmes populaires slaves op. 8 (composed 1940, unpublished):
  - Prélude
  - Berceuse
  - Scherzetto
  - Variations
- D'une âme...: poème en dix chants op. 15b (orchestration 1942–50, unpublished)

=== Songs ===
- 3 Mélodies (after poems by Paul Fort) op. 1 (composed 1937–38, unpublished):
  - La Ronde
  - Berceuse
  - La France
- 2 Chansons for soprano and tenor op. 2 (composed 1939, unpublished)
- 8 Chants populaires op. 4 (composed 1939, unpublished):
  - 3 chansons champenoises:
    - Trimausett' (chant de quête)
    - Pastorale châlonnaise
    - Le petit bossu
  - 3 chansons canadiennes:
    - Je n'ai pas de barbe au menton
    - J'ai cueilli la belle rose
    - C'est le vent frivolant
  - 2 chansons de Lorraine:
    - Fauchette la quêteuse
    - En passant par la Lorraine
- 3 Mélodies (after poems by Théophile Gautier) op. 5 (composed 1939, unpublished):
  - Dernier vœu
  - Noël
  - Carmen
- Soleil couchant (after a poem by Théophile Gautier) op. 7 (composed 1940, unpublished)
- Ouargla (after a poem by Pierre Bertin) op. 18 (composed 1945, unpublished)
- Prélude et fugue sur le nom de Jean-Sébastien Bach for voice and piano or harpsichord op. 27 (composed 1950, unpublished)
- Affinités secrètes (after a poem by Théophile Gautier) for soprano and piano op. 49 (composed 1973, unpublished)

=== Choral works ===
- Messe de Saint-Dominique for mixed choir a capella op. 25 (composed 1947, unpublished):
  - Kyrie
  - Gloria
  - Sanctus
  - Benedictus
  - Agnus Dei

=== Voice and orchestra ===
- 3 Chansons champenoises for soprano and orchestra (excerpts from 8 Chants populaires op. 4b, orchestration 1939, unpublished)
- 3 Mélodies for soprano and orchestra op. 5b (orchestration 1939, unpublished)
- Soleil couchant for soprano and orchestra op. 7b (orchestration 1940, unpublished)
- La Messiade: oratorio for soloists, choirs and orchestra op. 10 (composed 1941, unpublished):
  - Chant Premier: La Trahison (Prélude, Scène I, Scène II, Scène III)
  - Chant Deuxième: Le Jugement
  - Chant Troisième: La Mort sur le Golgotha (Prélude et Marche Funèbre, Double Chœur, Choral)
- Cavalier (after a poem by Saint-Georges de Bouhélier) for mixed choir and orchestra op. 13 (composed 1942, unpublished)
- Pygmalion délivré: scène lyrique op. 14 (composed 1942, unpublished)
- Ophelia (after a poem by Arthur Rimbaud) for female voices and orchestra op. 16 (composed 1943, unpublished)
- Icare: scène lyrique (after a text by Jules Supervielle) for soprano, tenor, bariton and orchestra op. 17 (composed 1943, unpublished)
- Danse de Nymphes (after a poem by Tristan Derème) for female voices and orchestra op. 19 (composed 1944, unpublished)
- Louise de la Miséricorde: scène lyrique (cantate) (after a text by Charles Clerc) for soprano, mezzo-soprano, bariton and orchestra op. 20 (composed 1944, unpublished)
- Psautier for soprano and orchestra op. 65 (composed 1980, unpublished)

=== Symphonic Orchestra ===
- Marana Thâ op. 74 (composed 1989, unpublished):
  - Invocation
  - Fulgurances et clairs-obscurs
  - Amen

=== Ballet ===
- Cecca, la Bohémienne ensorcelée. Ballet in 1 act and 3 scenes op. 22 (composed 1943–45)

=== Transcriptions for organ solo ===
- Johann Sebastian Bach: Musical Offering. Brussels, Belgium: Schott Frères, 1963.
- Johann Sebastian Bach: Variations Goldberg. Unpublished.

=== Pedagogical works ===
- Initiation à l'orgue. Paris: Bornemann/Leduc, 1971.
- École de la Technique Moderne de l'Orgue (unpublished):
  - 1ère partie: Théorie de la Technique
  - 2ème partie: Pratique de la Technique de pédale (Tome A: Gammes - Tome B: Arpèges)

== Selected discography ==
- Marcel Dupré: Intégrale de l'oeuvre.
  - Disque 1. Oeuvres d'orgue: Les nymphéas, op. 54. Scherzo, op. 16. Angélus, op. 34. Deux esquisses, op. 41.
  - Disque 2. OEuvres d'orgue: Trois préludes et fugues, op. 7. Trois préludes et fugues, op. 36.
  - Disque 3. OEuvres d'orgue: Trois hymnes, op. 58. Annonciation, op. 56. Six antiennes, op. 48. Variations sur un vieux noël, op. 20.
    - Rolande Falcinelli, organ. Recorded at the Auditorium Marcel Dupré, Meudon. France: Disque Edici, 1968. ED 001 101. 3 LPs.
- Marcel Dupré: Oeuvres pour piano et orgue.
  - Variations sur deux themes, op. 35 - Ballade, op. 30 - Sinfonia, op. 42 - Variations en ut diese mineur, op. 22, pour piano.
    - Rolande Falcinelli, piano. Marie-José Chasseguet, organ. Recorded at the Auditorium Marcel Dupré, Meudon. Lyon, France: REM, 1977. 1 LP.
- Marcel Dupré: Le chemin de la croix, op. 29.
  - Rolande Falcinelli, organ. Grandes Orgues de Notre-Dame de Paris, June 1981. Sigéan, France: Disques du Solstice, 2001. SOCD 193/4. 1 CD.
- The Art of Rolande Falcinelli: Interpreter, Composer, Improviser.
  - César Franck (Choral No. 1), Marcel Dupré (Esquisses op. 41, Carillon op. 27), Rolande Falcinelli (Sonatina per Scherzare op. 73, Offertoire from Messe op. 38), and two improvisations.
    - Rolande Falcinelli, organ. Orgues de la Cathédrale de Dijon et du Münster de Basel (Switzerland). Netherlands: Festivo, 2006. Festivo 6962.062. 1 CD.
- Rolande Falcinelli interprète du XXe siècle.
  - Œuvres de Marcel Dupré, César Franck, Louis Vierne.
    - Rolande Falcinelli, organ. Orgue de la Cathédrale de Belley. France: Éditions Hortus, 2006. Hortus 038. 1 CD.
- Rolande Falcinelli joue Rolande Falcinelli.
  - Esquisses Symphoniques en forme de Variations op. 45, Miniatures persanes op. 52, Prophétie d’après Ezéchiel op. 42.
    - Rolande Falcinelli, organ. Orgue de la Cathédrale St. Pierre d’Angoulême, 1984. Festivo, 2007. Festivo 6962.112. 1 CD.

== Bibliography ==
- Alford, Lenore. "Able fairy: the feminine aesthetic in the compositions of Rolande Falcinelli." Doctoral dissertation, The University of Texas at Austin, 2008.
- Association des Amis de l'Orgue. Rolande Falcinelli et la classe d'orgue du Conservatoire. "L'Orgue: Cahiers et Mémoires" No. 26. Paris: Association des Amis de l'Orgue, 1981.
- Detournay, Stéphane. "La Missa Brevissima de Rolande Falcinelli", dossier, Université de Lille III, 1996.
- Detournay, Stéphane. " Le chant des sources : les écrits spirituels de Rolande Falcinelli, Mémoire de DEA, Université de Lille III, 1998.
- Detournay, Stéphane. "Mathnavi de Rolande Falcinelli", dossier d'ethnomusicologie, Université de Lille III, 1997.
- Detournay, Stéphane. " Présentation et commentaire de deux conférences de Rolande Falcinelli", séminaire d'esthétique, Université de Lille III.
- Detournay, Stéphane. " Rolande Falcinelli et la tradition musicale savante d'Iran, Mémoire de Maîtrise, Université de Lille III, 1997.
- Detournay, Stéphane. " Zurkhâné de Rolande Falcinelli, commentaire d'une conférence augmenté de l'analyse d'une œuvre", Université de Lille III, 1997.
- Detournay, Stéphane. Rolande Falcinelli: Une esthétique de la synthèse. Thèse de doctorat, Université de Lille III. ISBN 2-7295-5120-4.
- Detournay, Stéphane. "Rolande Falcinelli et l’improvisation." L’orgue No. 263 (2003), pp. 29–42.
- Falcinelli, Rolande. Marcel Dupré, 1955: Quelques Œuvres. Paris: Alphonse Leduc, 1955.
- Falcinelli, Rolande. Initiation à l'orgue. Paris: Éditions Bornemann, 1971.
- Falcinelli, Rolande. "L’art de l’improvisation." L’orgue No. 218 (1991), pp. 25–30.
- Falcinelli Rolande. "Ecole de la Technique moderne de l'orgue", 3 tomes, inédit.
- Falcinelli Rolande. "Etude sur l'orgue romantique" in Cahiers de L'Orgue, n°5, Toulouse, [1960].
- Falcinelli Rolande. "Evolution de l'orgue, faisons le point", in Musique et instruments, Horizons de France, 1976.
- Falcinelli Rolande. " Introduction à l'enseignement de l'orgue", inédit.
- Falcinelli Rolande. " L'enseignement de l'orgue" in Musique et radio, 1964.
- Falcinelli Rolande. " L'orgue", communication pour l'Institut de France, 1964.
- Falcinelli Rolande. "Panorama de la technique de l'orgue, son enseignement, ses difficultés, son devenir", inédit, 1998.
- Falcinelli Rolande. " Réflexion sur l'enseignement de la technique, du style et de l'interprétation à l'orgue" in Musique et instruments, 1966?
- Falcinelli Rolande. " Regard sur l'interprétation à l'orgue", inédit, 1998.
