= La Madeleine, Paris =

Church in the 8th arrondissement of Paris

Church of Saint Mary Magdalene
- French: L'église Sainte-Marie-Madeleine
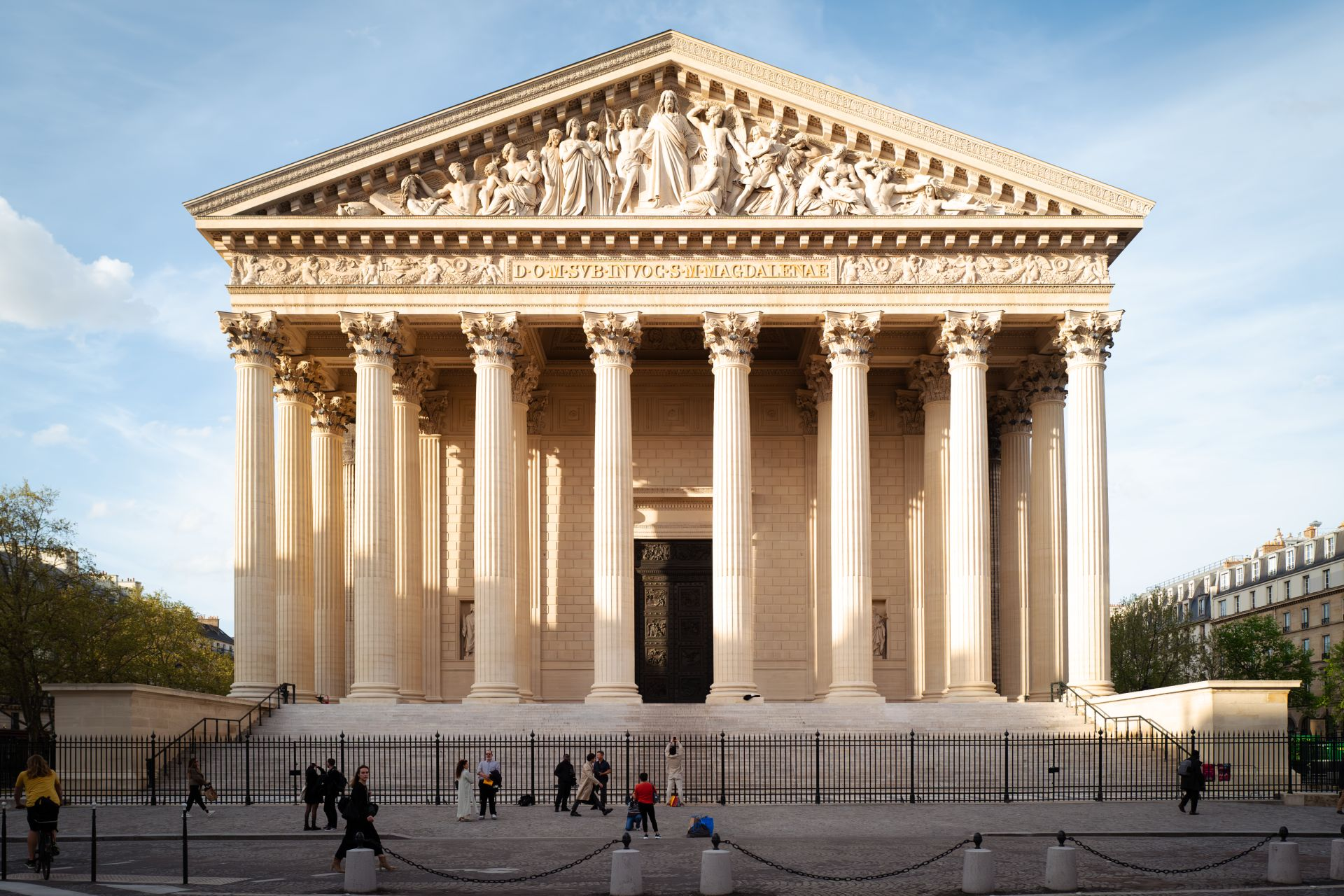
- Church of Saint Mary Magdalene
- 48.8700°N 2.3244°E
- Location: 8th arrondissement of Paris
- Country: France
- Denomination: Catholic
- Website: eglise-lamadeleine.com

History
- Status: Parish Church
- Founder: Napoleon (1807)
- Dedication: Mary Magdalene
- Consecrated: 24 July 1842

Architecture
- Functional status: Active
- Heritage designation: Monument Historique PA00088812
- Designated: 1915
- Architect: Pierre-Alexandre Vignon
- Architectural type: Roman temple
- Style: Neo-Classical
- Groundbreaking: 1807
- Completed: 1828

Specifications
- Length: 108 m (354 ft)
- Width: 43 m (141 ft)

Administration
- Archdiocese: Paris

La Madeleine, Paris
UNESCO World Heritage Site
- Interactive map of La Madeleine, Paris
- Part of: Paris, Banks of the Seine
- Criteria: Cultural: i, ii, iv
- Reference: 600
- Inscription: 1991 (15th Session)

The Church of Saint Mary Magdalene (French: église Sainte-Marie-Madeleine [eɡliz sɛ̃t maʁi madlɛn]), less formally called La Madeleine ([la madlɛn]), is a Catholic parish church on Place de la Madeleine in the eighth arrondissement of Paris. It was planned by Louis XV as the focal point of the new Rue Royal, leading to the new Place Louis XV, the present Place de la Concorde. It was dedicated in 1764 by Louis XV, but work was halted due to the French Revolution. Napoleon Bonaparte had it redesigned in the Neoclassical style to become a monument to the glory of his armies. After his downfall in 1814, construction as a church resumed, but it was not completed until 1842. The building is surrounded on all four sides by Corinthian columns. The interior is noted for its frescoes on the domed ceiling, and monumental sculptures by François Rude, Carlo Marochetti and other prominent 19th-century French artists.

== History ==
=== First church ===
The neighbourhood, then at the edge of Paris, was annexed to the city in 1722. An earlier church of Saint-Marie-Madeleine was built in the 13th century on avenue Malesherbes, but was considered too small for the growing neighbourhood. Louis XV authorised the construction of a new, larger church, with a view along Rue Royale toward the new Place Louis XV, now Place de la Concorde. In 1763 the King laid the first stone for a new church, designed by Pierre Contant d'Ivry and Guillaume-Martin Couture.

The first design for the new church by Pierre Contant d'Ivry proposed a large dome atop a building in the form of Latin cross, similar to the Les Invalides church designed by Jules Hardouin Mansart. D'Ivry died in 1777 and was replaced by his pupil Guillaume Martin Couture. Couture abandoned the first plan, demolished much of the early work, and went to work on a simpler, more classical design, modelled after an ancient Greek or Roman temple.

=== Proposed monument to Napoleon's Army and railroad station, then church again ===
The construction of the new church was abruptly halted in 1789 by the French Revolution, with only the foundations and grand classical portico completed. After the execution of Louis XVI in 1793, his body was transported to the old Church of the Madeleine, which was still standing until 1801. The King's body was thrown onto bed of quicklime at the bottom of a pit and covered by one of earth, the whole being firmly and thoroughly tamped down. Louis XVI's head was placed at his feet. On 21 January 1815 Louis XVI and Marie Antoinette's remains were moved to a new tomb in the Basilica of Saint-Denis.

Under the Revolutionary government, a debate began on the future purpose of the building. Proposals included a library, a public ballroom, and a marketplace. The new building of the National Assembly, in the Palais Bourbon, at the other end of the former Rue Royale, was given a classical colonnade to match the already completed portico of church. The new Emperor, Napoleon Bonaparte, was crowned in 1804 and in 1806 settled the debate. In 1806 he declared that the church would become "A Temple to the Glory of the Grand Army". While on a military campaign in Poland, he personally chose the design of a new architect, Pierre-Alexandre Vignon, over the design that was recommended to him by the Academy of Architecture. The plan of Vignon took the form of a classical temple with Corinthian columns on all four sides. The work began anew, with new foundations but preserving the classical columns that had already been raised.

=== Completion of the church (1855) ===
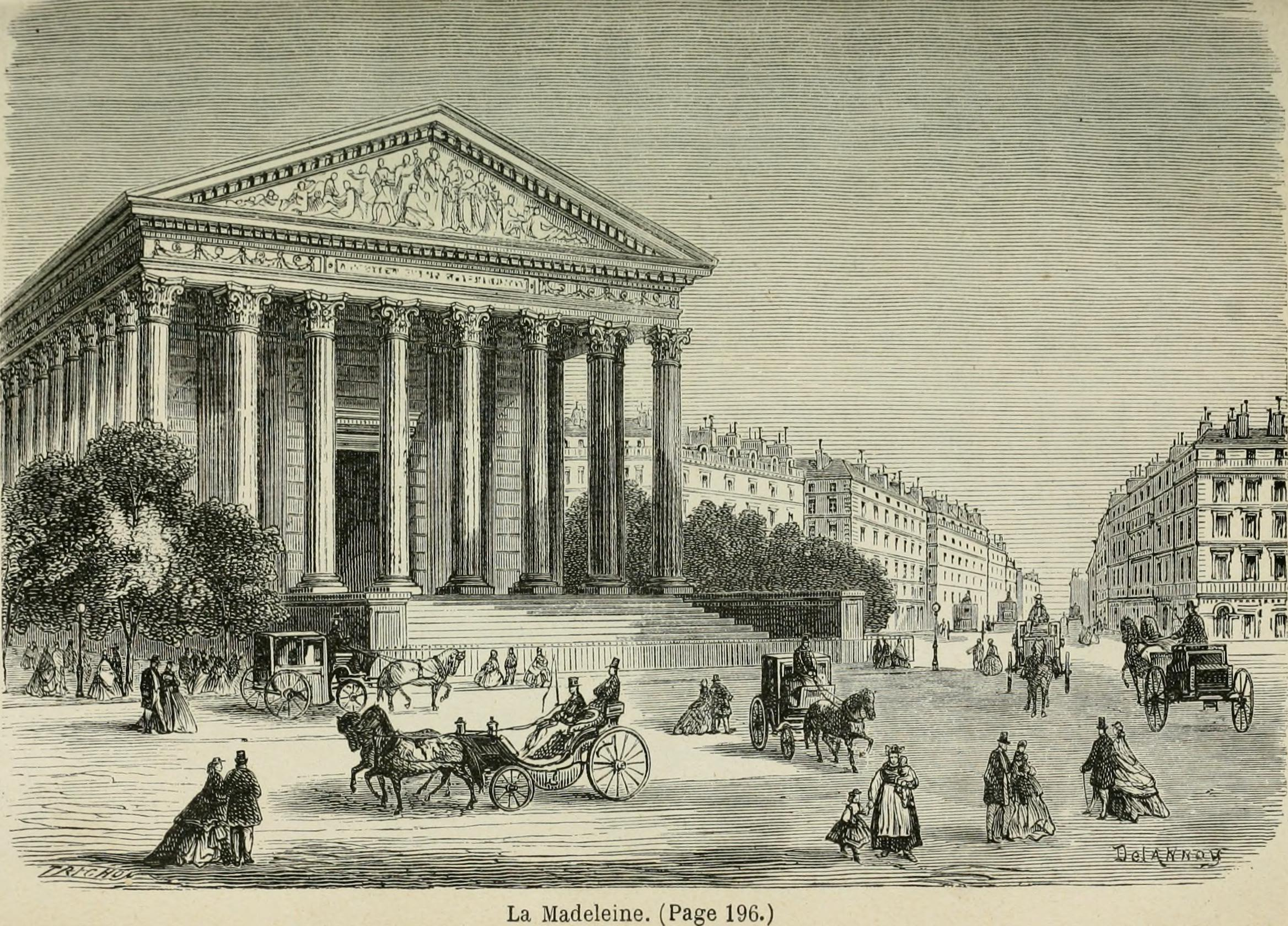
The church in 1867

After the fall of Napoleon in 1814, the new King, Louis XVIII, resumed construction on the unfinished church, which he intended to make an Expiatory chapel for the sins of the Revolution and the execution of Louis XVI. However, this idea was dropped, and the new church was instead dedication to Mary Magdalene, or the Madeleine, a follower of Jesus who witnessed both the Crucifixion and the Resurrection of Christ.

The architect Vignon died in 1828 before completing the project and was replaced by Jacques-Marie Huvé. A new competition was set up in 1828–29 to determine the design for sculptures for the pediment. The design chosen was The Last Judgment, depicting Saint Mary Magdalene kneeling to pray for sinners, by Philippe Joseph Henri Lemaire. The new government of the July Monarchy decided to go ahead with the church, despite financial difficulties. in 1830 they declared that it would be dedicated to national reconciliation. The vaults were finally completed in 1831.

Work on the church was largely completed during the reign of King Louis Philippe I, between 1830 and 1848. in 1837 a proposal was brought forward to convert church into the first railroad station in Paris, but this was abandoned as expensive and impractical. The church was finally inaugurated on 24 July 1842, the day of Saint Mary-Magdalene.

The new church became popular with musicians. The funeral of Frédéric Chopin at the Church of the Madeleine in Paris was delayed almost two weeks, until 30 October 1849. Chopin had requested that Mozart's Requiem be sung. The Requiem had major parts for female voices, but the Church of the Madeleine had never permitted female singers in its choir. The church finally relented, on condition that the female singers remain behind a black velvet curtain.

During the Paris Commune of 1871, the curé of the church, Abbé Deguerry, was one of those arrested and held hostage by the Commune. He was executed alongside Georges Darboy, the Archbishop of Paris and four other hostages on 24 May, during the Semaine sanglante, as French government troops were bloodily retaking the city and executing Communard defenders.

Besides Chopin, musicians and artists whose funerals were held at the church include Jacques Offenbach, Charles Gounod, Camille Saint-Saëns, Coco Chanel, Joséphine Baker, Charles Trenet, Dalida and Johnny Hallyday.

== Exterior ==
=== Inspiration ===
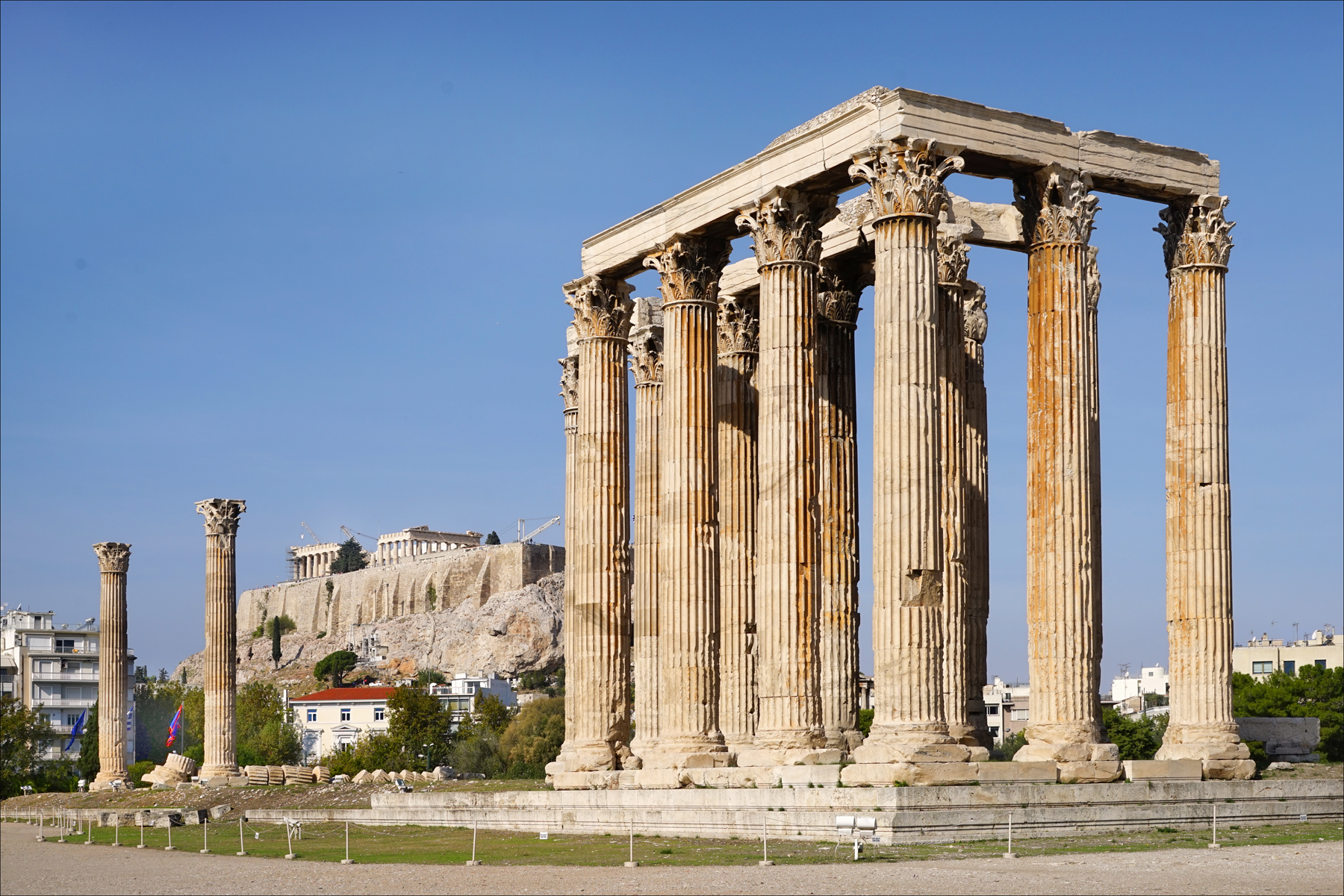
The Temple of Olympian Zeus in Athens (6th century BC)

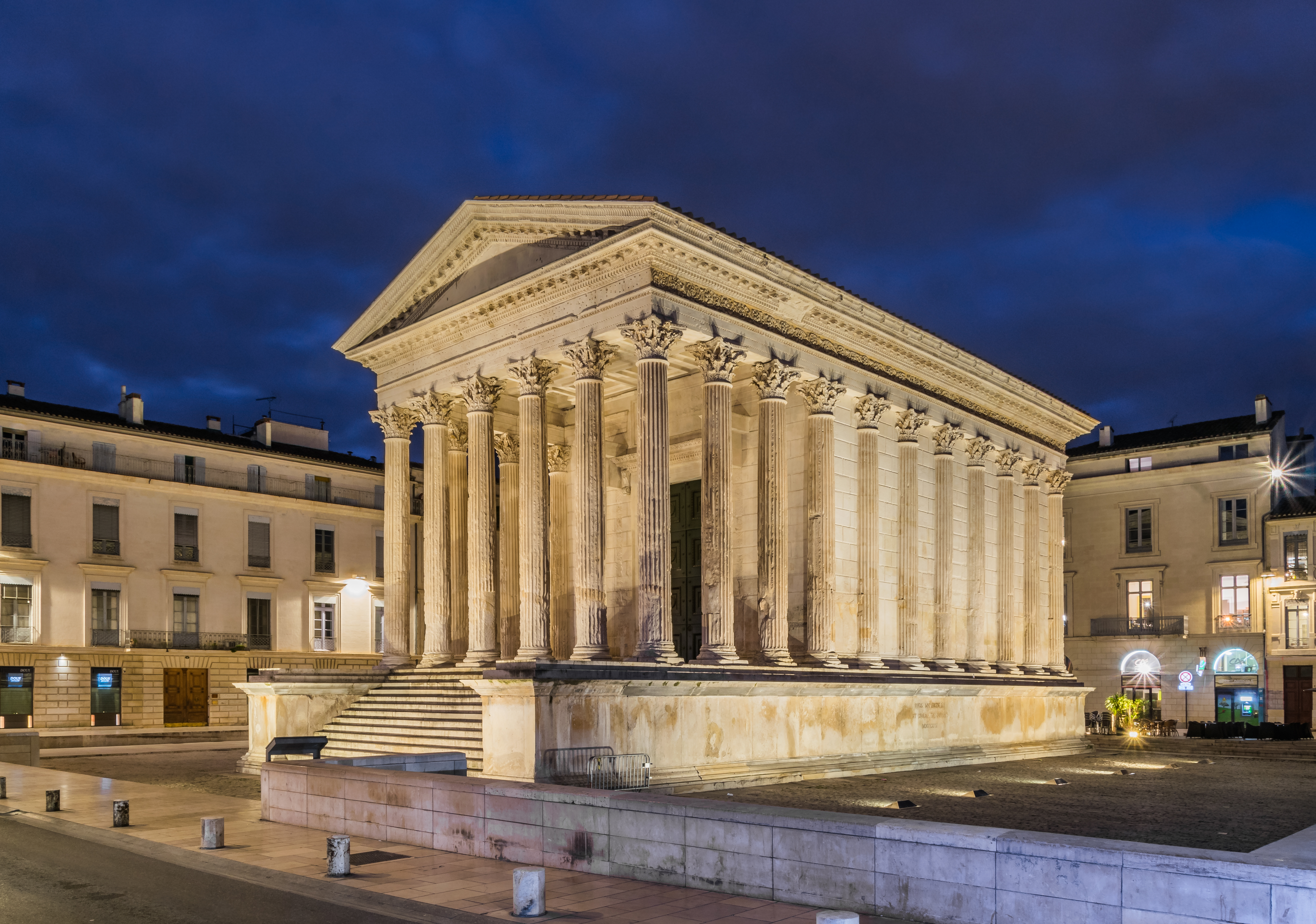
The Maison Carrée from Nîmes (2 A.D.)

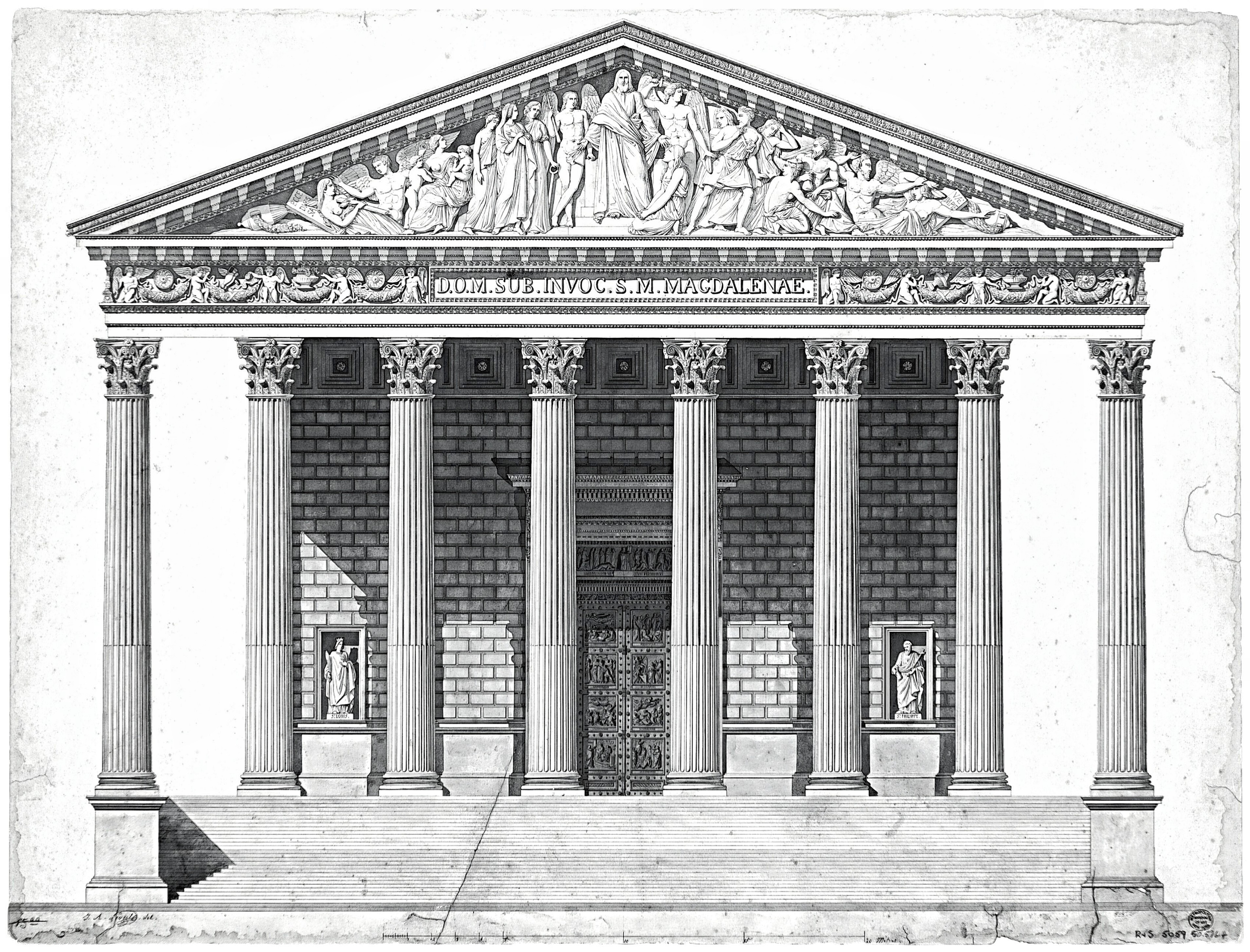
Vignon's design for the facade

The design of the church by Vignon was an example of the Neo-Classical style, using the plan of a peripteral Greek temple, with rows of classical columns around all four exterior sides, not just on the facade. Notable examples included the Temple of Olympian Zeus, the largest temple in ancient Athens, located below the Parthenon, and the much smaller Roman Maison Carrée in Nîmes in France one of the best-preserved of all Roman temples (here the columns around the cella are "engaged" or half-embedded in the wall). The Madeleine is one of the rare large neo-classical buildings to imitate the whole external form of an ancient temple, rather than just the portico front. Its fifty-two Corinthian columns, each 20 metres (66 feet) high, surround the building.

=== South facade ===
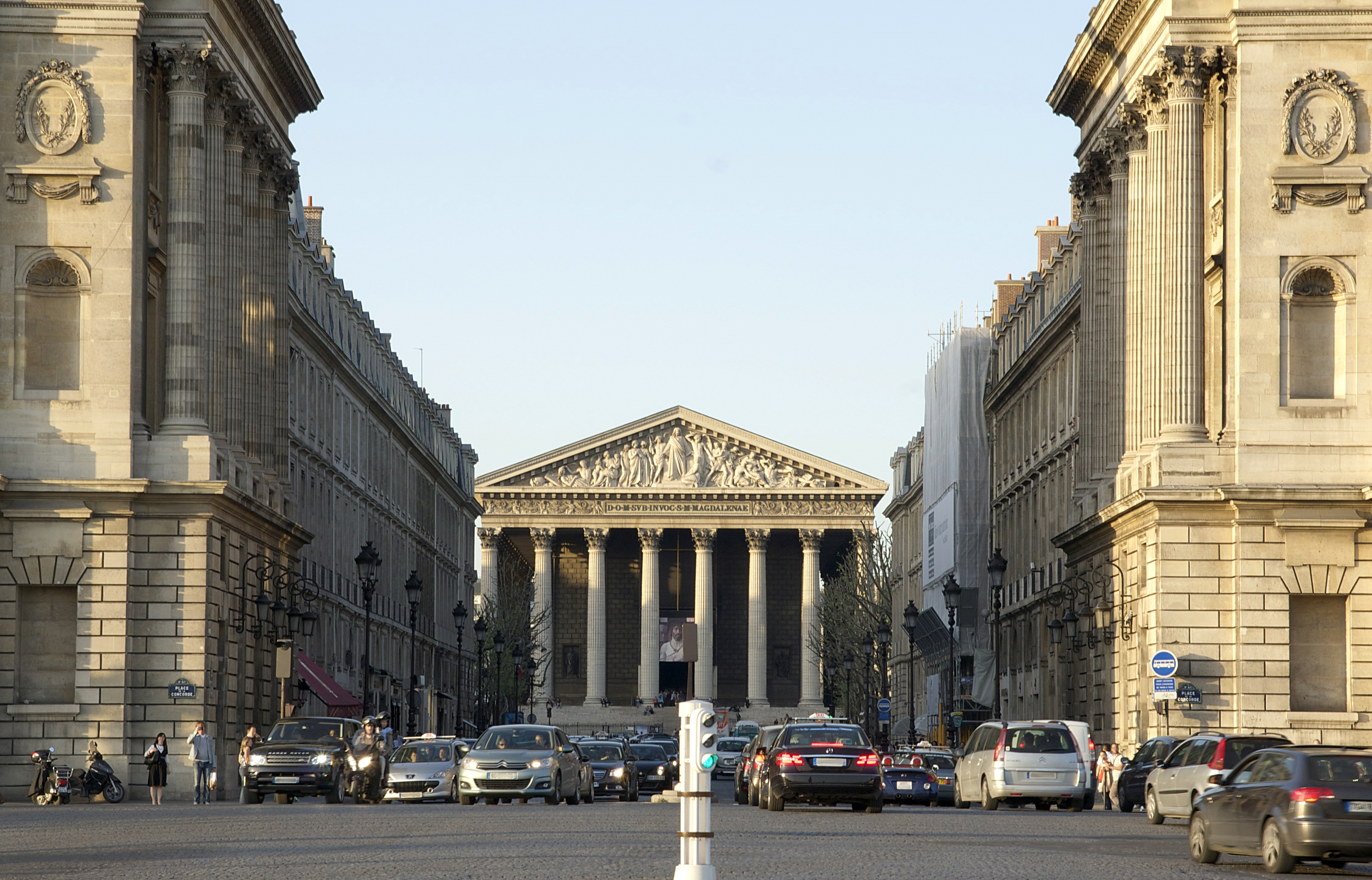
The view of the church along Rue Royale from the Place de la Concorde. The strict harmony of the buildings was assured by a royal decree in 1824.

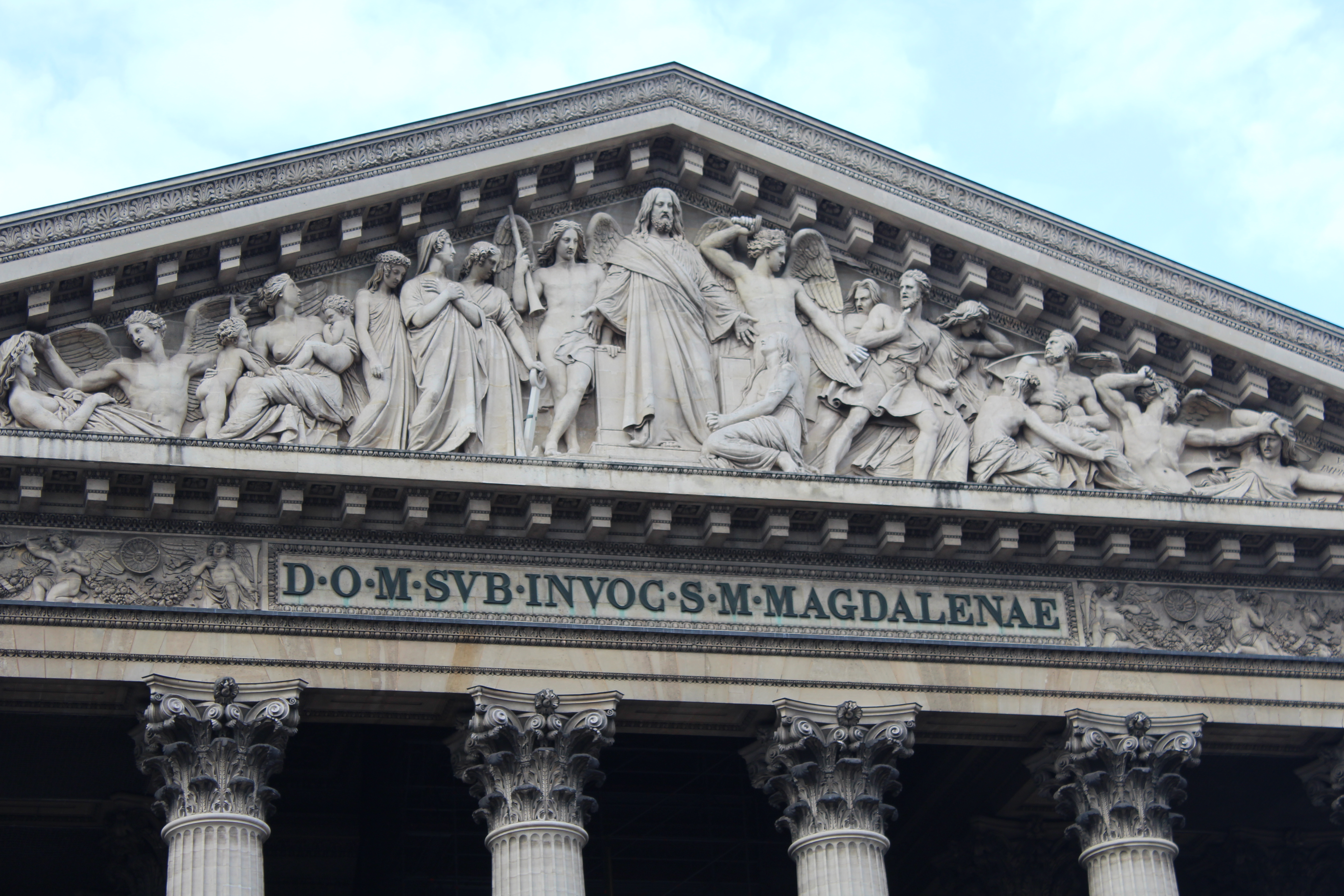
Detail of the pediment sculpture The Last Judgement by Philippe Joseph Henri Lemaire.

The inscription on the frieze over the entrance reads in Latin: D⸱O⸱M⸱SVB⸱INVOC⸱S⸱M⸱MAGDALENAE, that is Deo Optimo Maximo sub invocatione Sanctae Mariae Magdalenae ("To God all-powerful and Very Great, under the invocation of Saint Mary Magdalen.")

The pedimental sculpture of the Last Judgement is by Philippe Joseph Henri Lemaire. Lemaire's sculpture also has a prominent place on the Arc de Triomphe. In the sculpture, Christ is in the centre, presiding over the Last Judgement, flanked by two angels. On the right is the Archangel Michael, with a group of figures representing the Vices, who will be refused entry to heaven. To the left are the Virtues, escorting those admitted to heaven. Mary Magdalene is shown kneeling with those refused entrance to heaven, expressing her repentance.

=== Bronze Doors ===
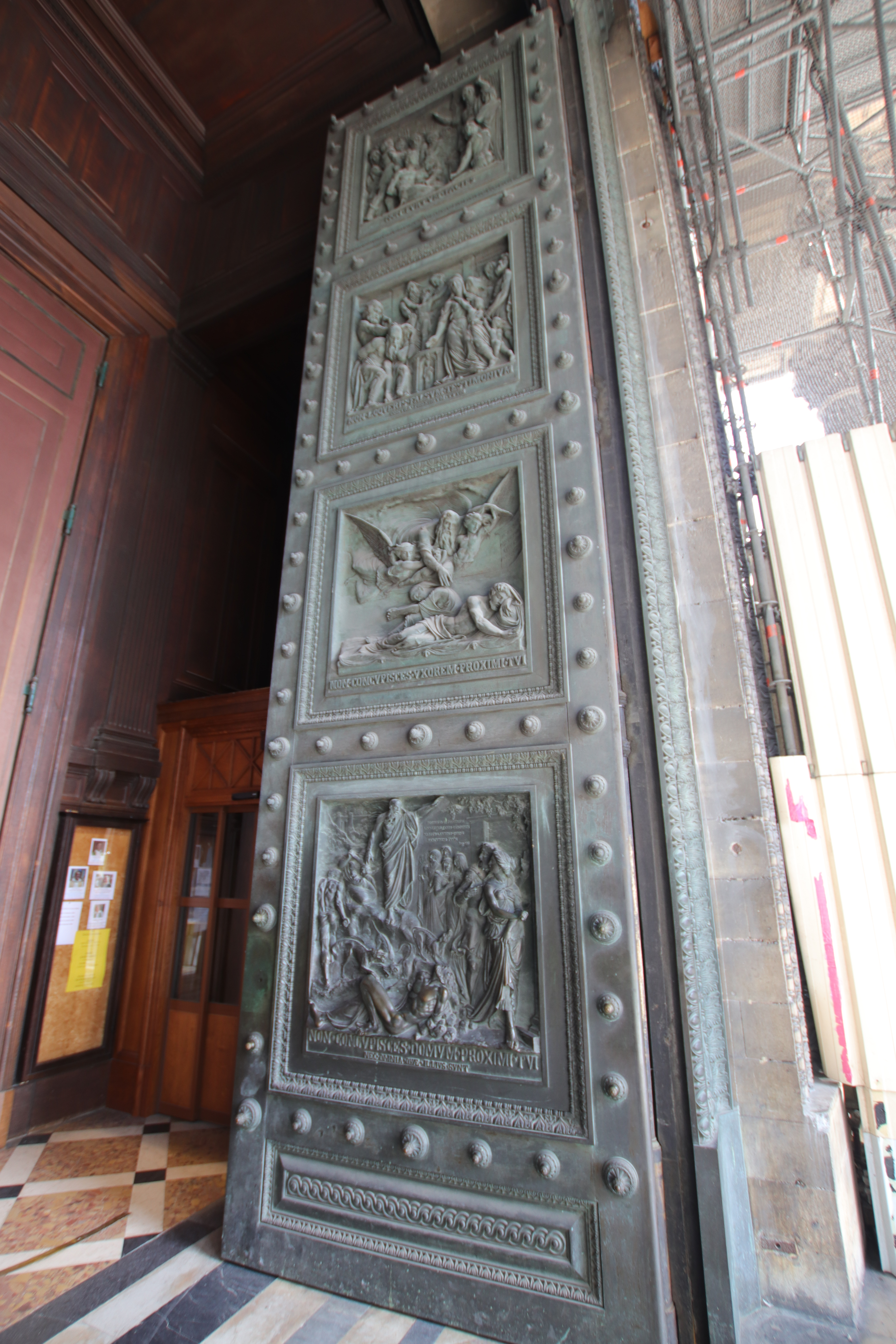
Bronze door of the South Portal, by Henri de Triqueti

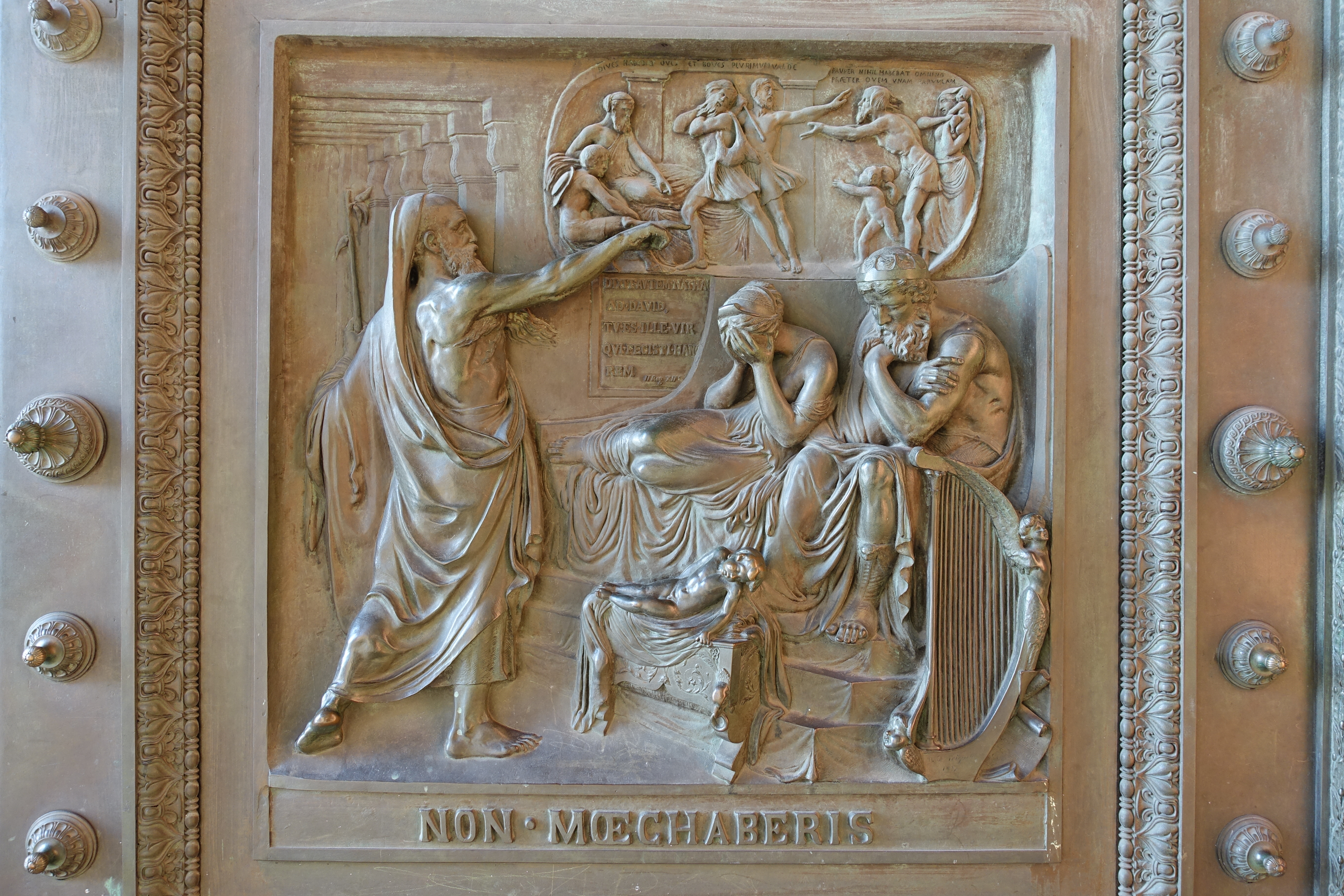
Ten Commandments - "Thou shalt not commit Adultery"

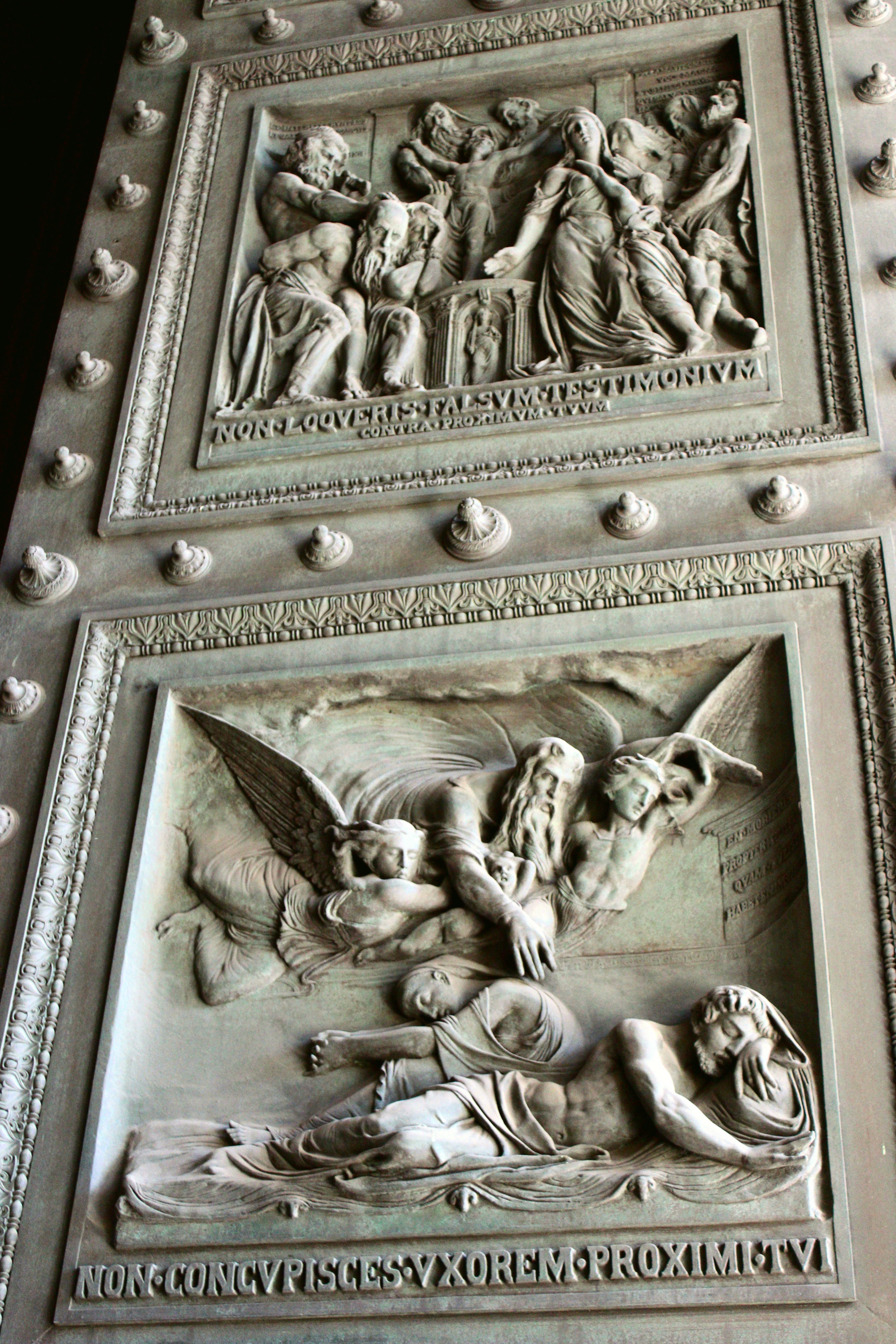
Detail of bronze doors

The large bronze doors of the south portal have reliefs illustrating the Ten Commandments. The artist was Henri de Triqueti (1804–1874), who was only thirty years old when he won the commission. His main influence was the doors made by Ghiberti for the Baptistry of Florence, as well as those found on Pantheon in Rome and Christian basilicas in Pisa, Rome, Verona and Venice. Their size is exceptional; they are larger than the doors of the Saint Peter's Basilica in Rome; but they were also designed to be thinner and lighter. Unlike many bronze church doors, they have no gilding, just the color of the bronze. The doors earned Triqueti a place as a royal sculptor for the projects of King Louis-Philippe, including sculpture in Napoleon's tomb.

=== Statues in niches of the Colonnade ===
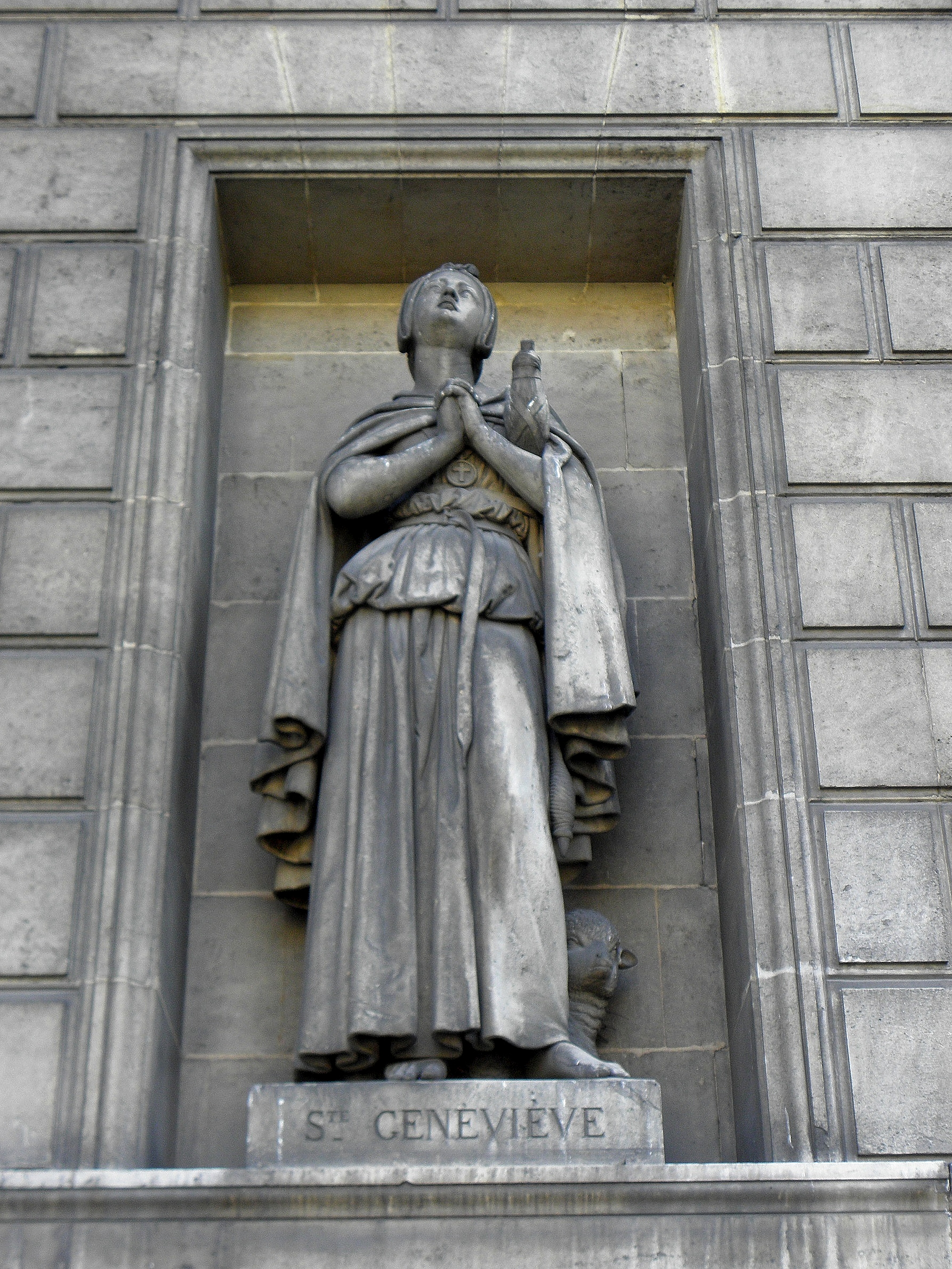
Saint Genevieve

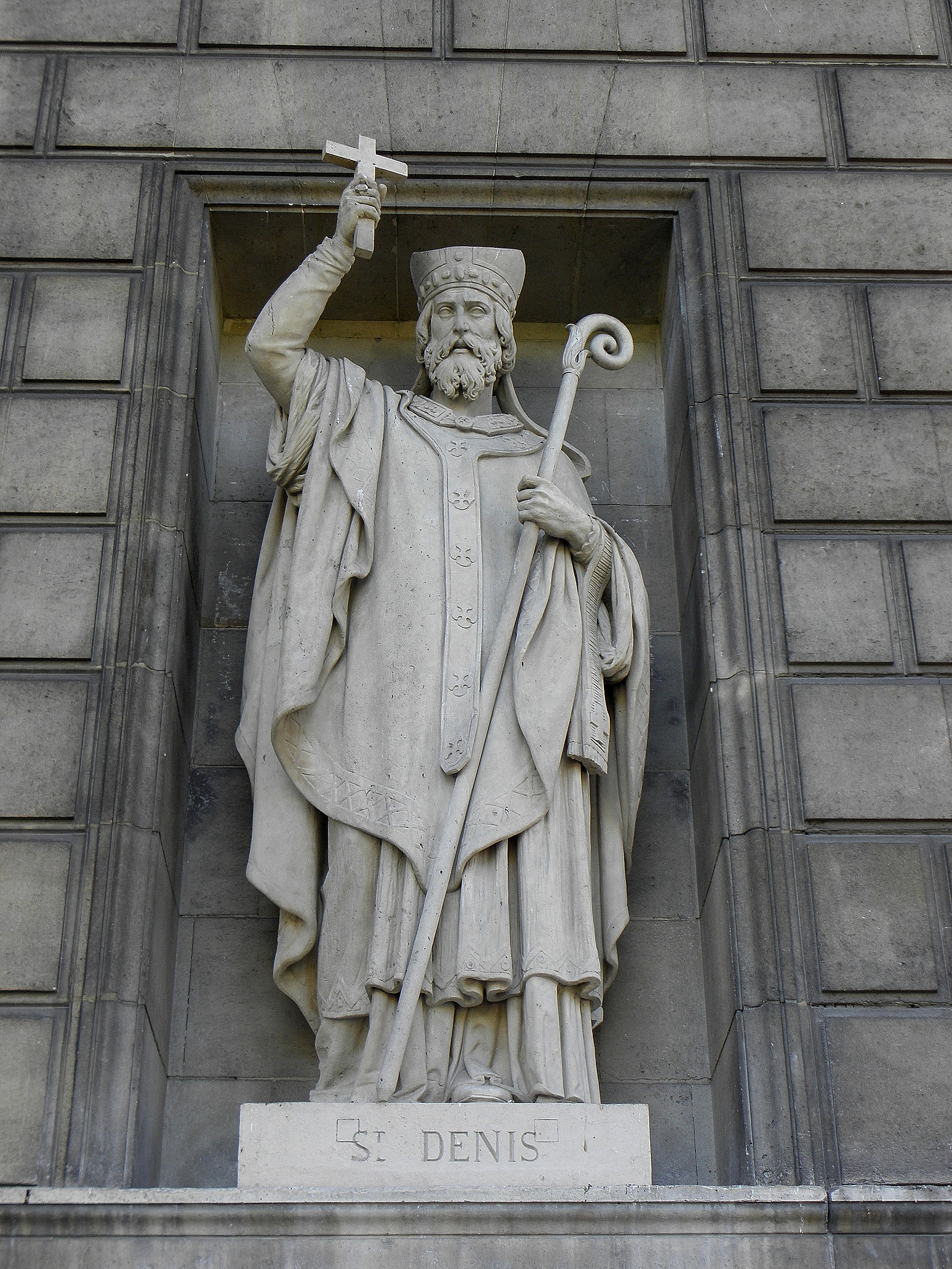
Saint Denis of Paris

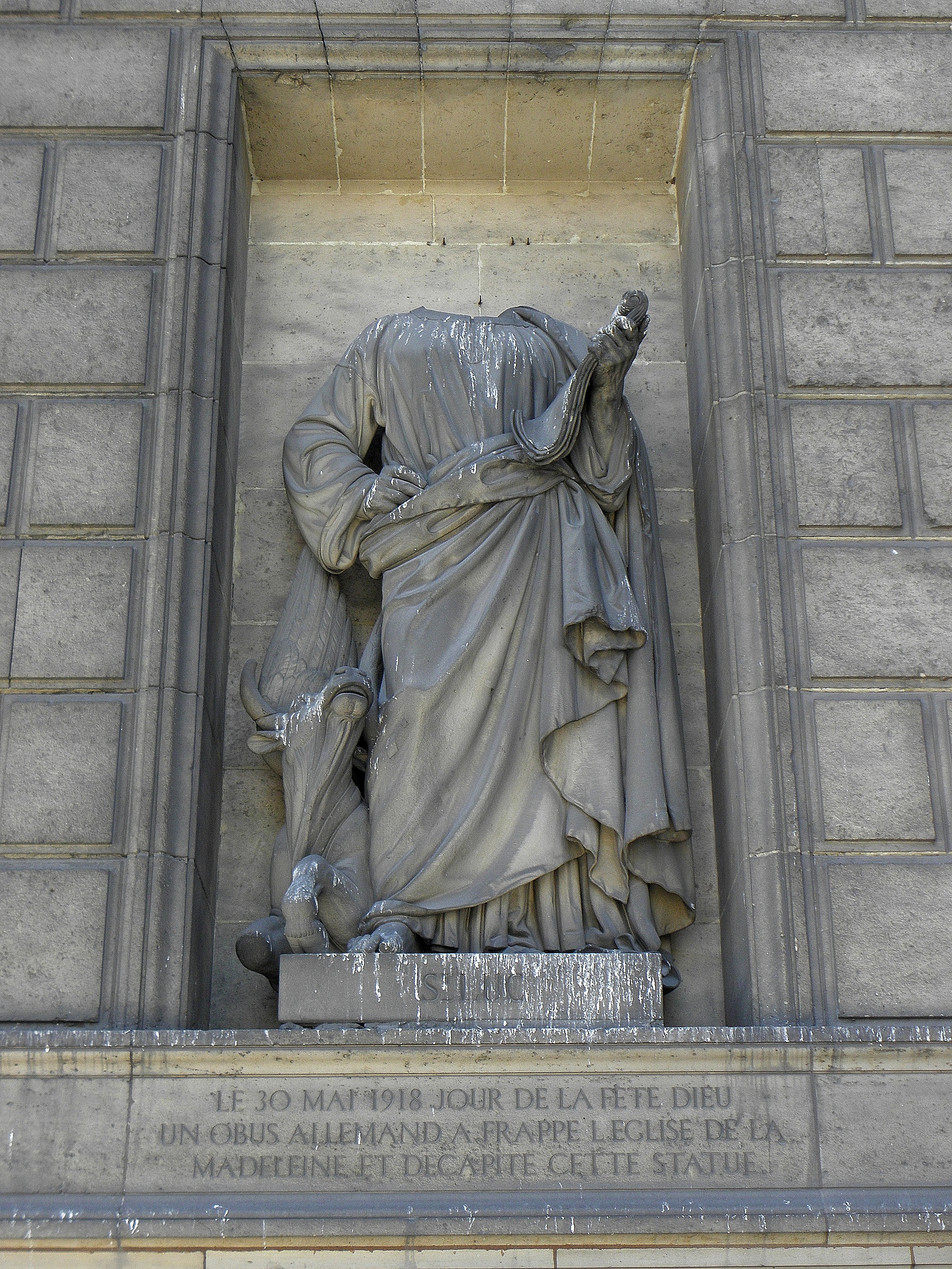
Saint Luke. The statue lost its head to a German shell in World War I.

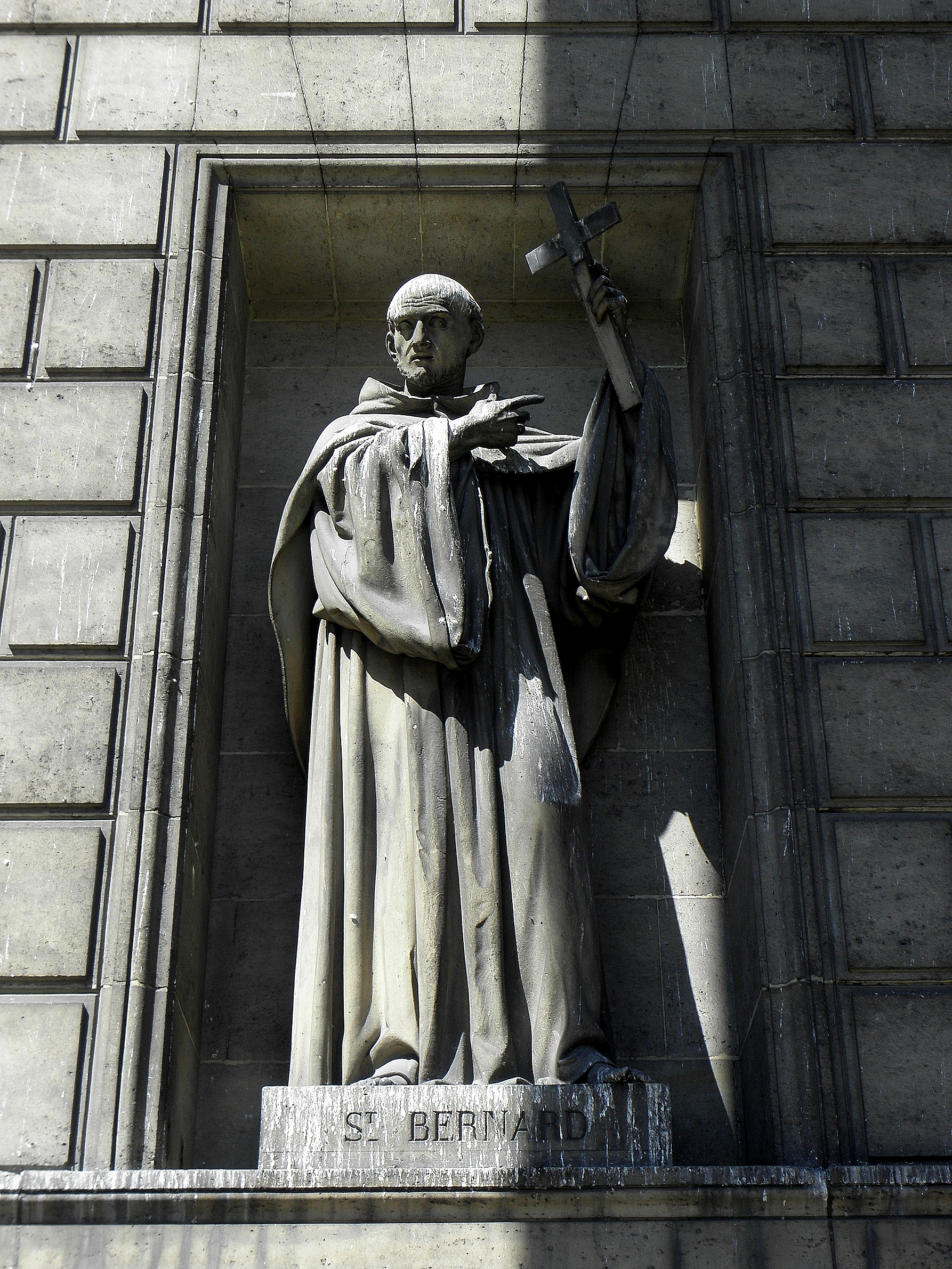
Saint Bernard of Clairvaux

Another feature of the exterior is a series of statues of Saints, made by different sculptors, alternating women and men, arranged on the outside walls along the portico, within the colonnade. The original plan by Vignon had only bare walls on the exterior, but the new architect, Huvé, proposed a series of thirty-three statues in niches. The selection of Saints was largely made by the Orleans family of King Louis Philippe and his family. The two most prominent places, by the south entrance, were given to traditional French Saints, Louis IX and Saint Philip, Bernard of Clairvaux, as well as Saint Joan of Arc and Saint Genevieve, the Patron Saint of Paris. At the north or rear end of the church, the heads of four of the statues were knocked off by the explosion of a German shell during the First World War, in 1918.

=== Exterior renovation ===
The South facade of the church underwent a major project of cleaning and restoration from 2020 to 2024, finished in time for the Paris Olympics.

== Parts ==
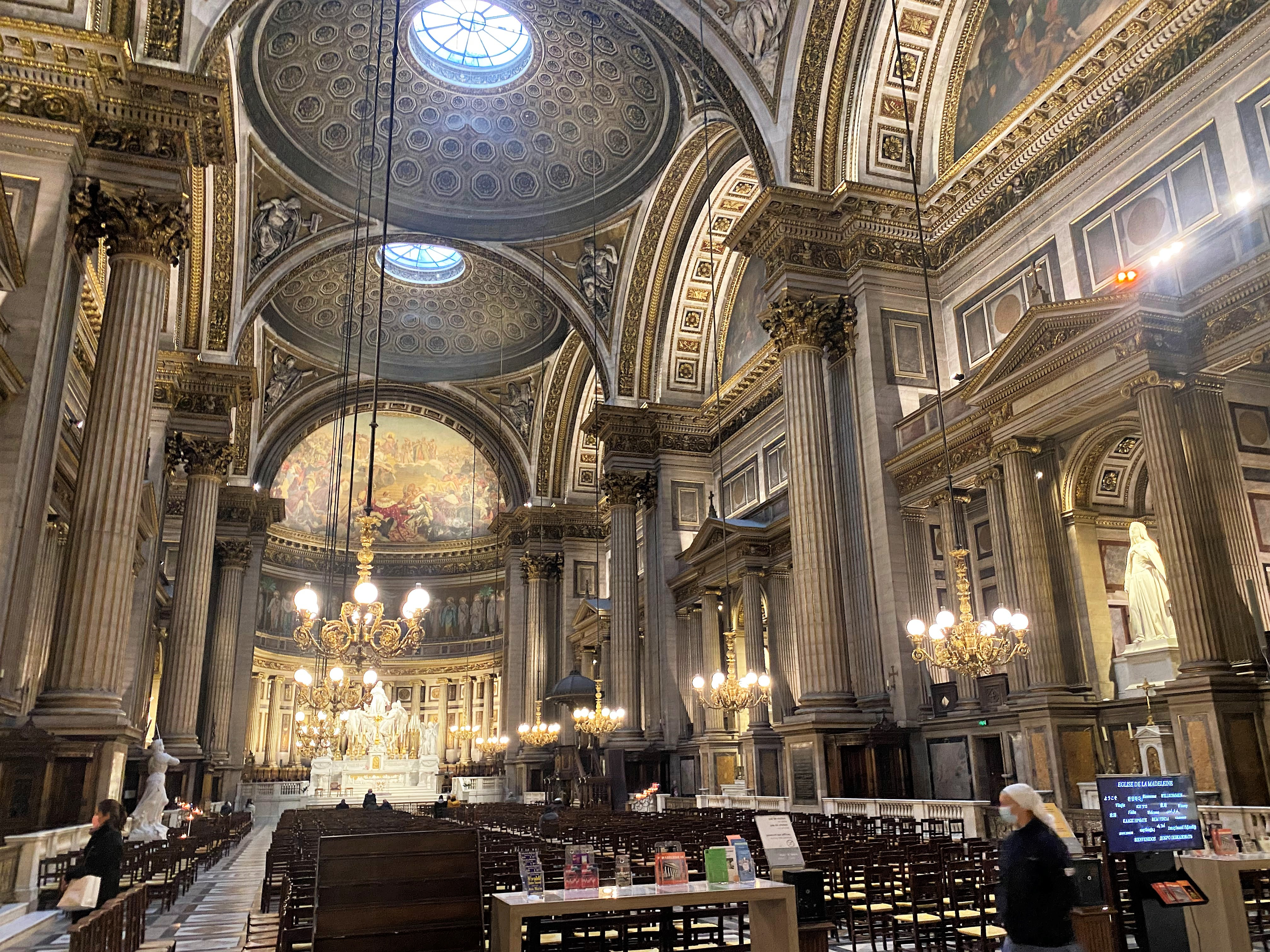
The nave and the choir, facing north toward the altar

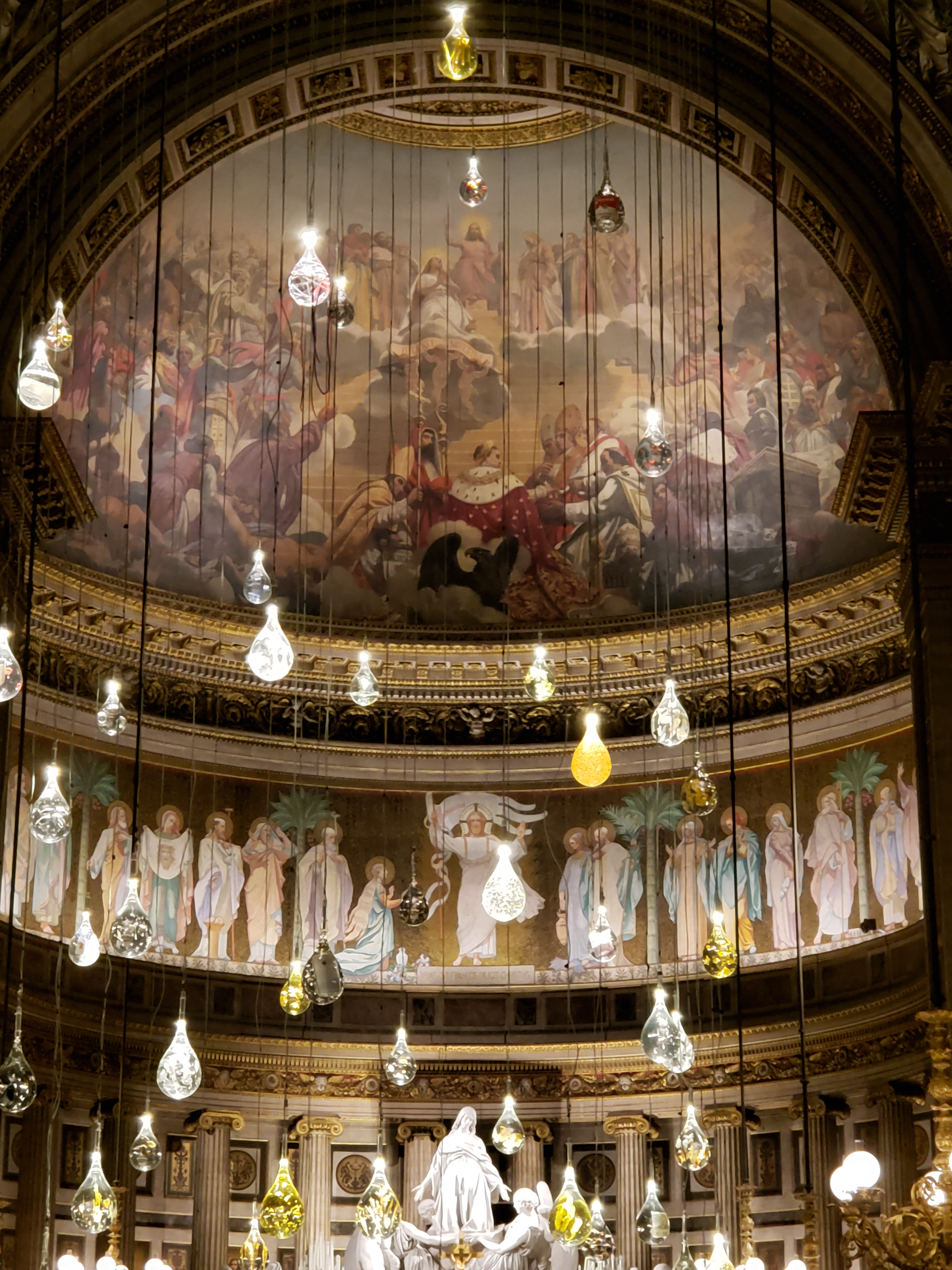
The choir decoration, Christmas 2022

The plan of the church was inspired more by the classical Roman architecture, particularly the baths, than by traditional church architecture. Inside, the church designed by Huvé is composed of a single long space, without a transept. It is divided into three wide arched bays, each with a dome, with circular skylights that provide limited illumination. All the walls and arches and the ceiling are covered with decoration, largely composed of colored marble in intricate geometric forms, and frequently gilded.

=== The choir dome – The History of Christianity ===
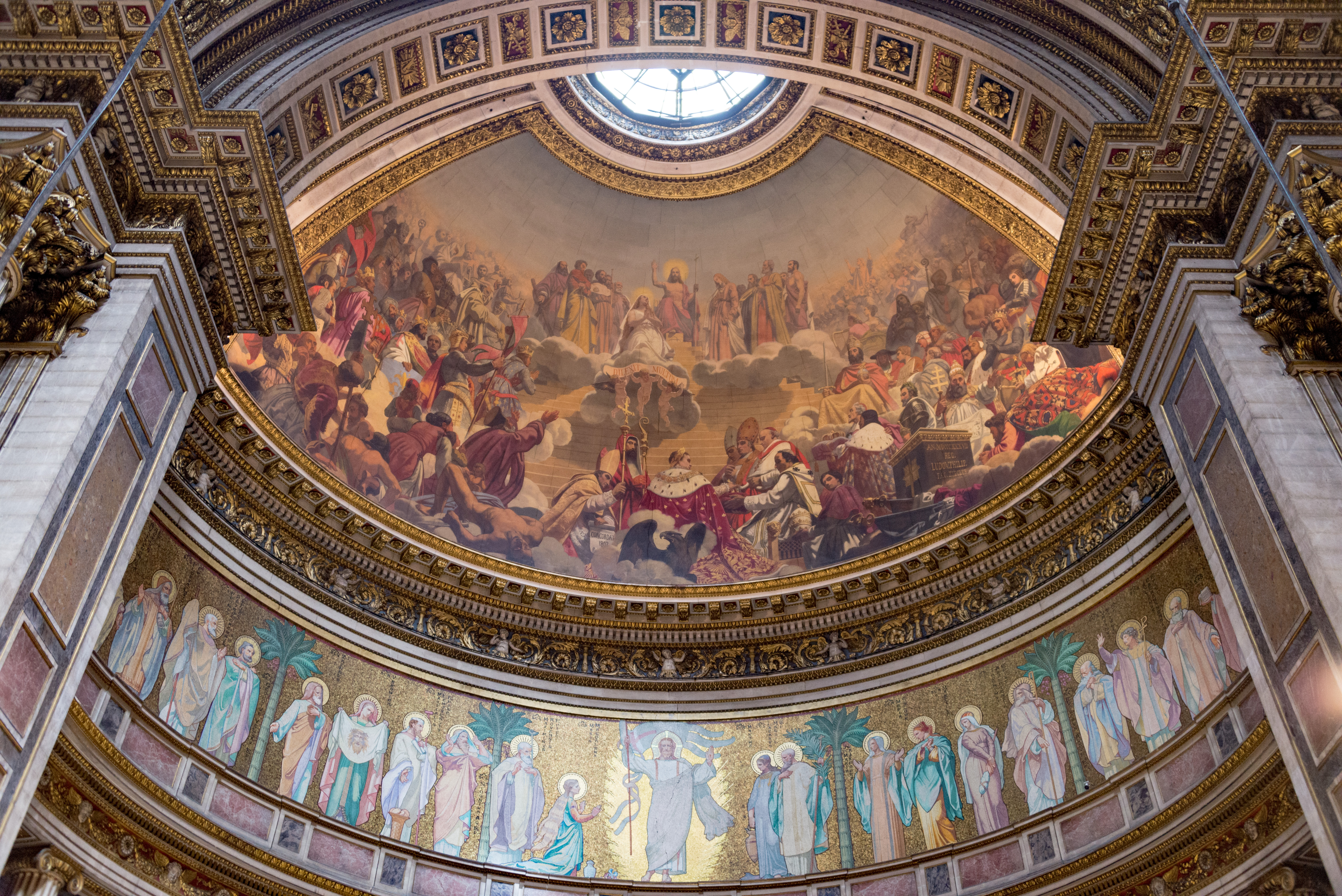
The History of Christianity and Christianity in France

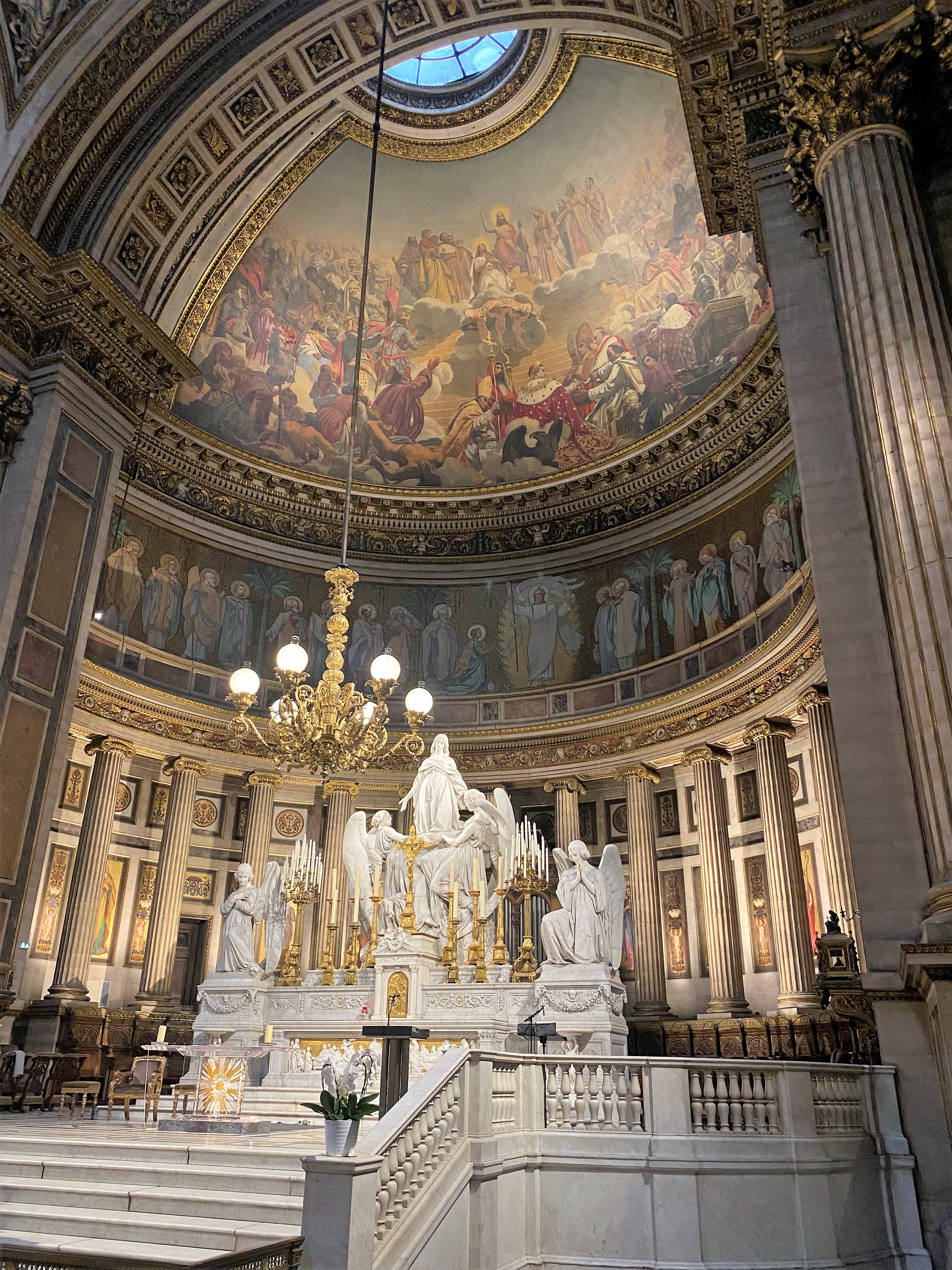
The choir and the altar, with The History of Christianity above

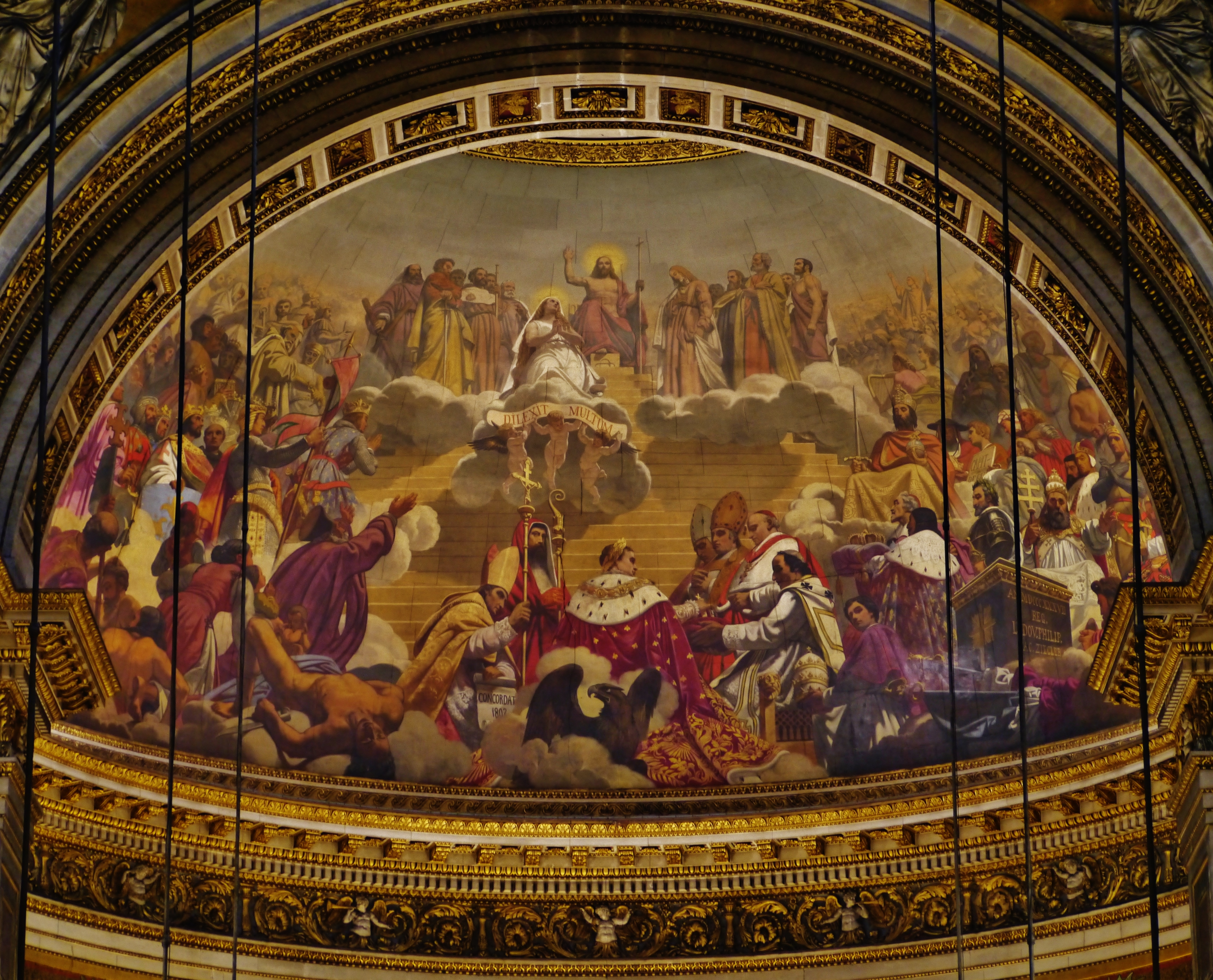
The History of Christianity fresco by Jules-Claude Ziegler. (Choir)

The cul-de-four or half-dome over the choir of the church is decorated with a painting by Jules-Claude Ziegler (1804–1856) which depicts major events in the history of Christianity, with an emphasis on France. At the top is the figure of Christ with Apostles and Mary Magdalene. In the foreground are Napoleon Bonaparte and Pope Pius VII signing the Concordat of 1801, which, following the French Revolution, marked the reconciliation of the French church and state and allowed Catholic churches to re-open in France. Ziegler was a pupil of Ingres, and painted the figures with the same realism and animation. The work took four years to complete.

=== Mosaic of Lameire – Christianity of France and The Ecstasy of Mary Magdalene ===
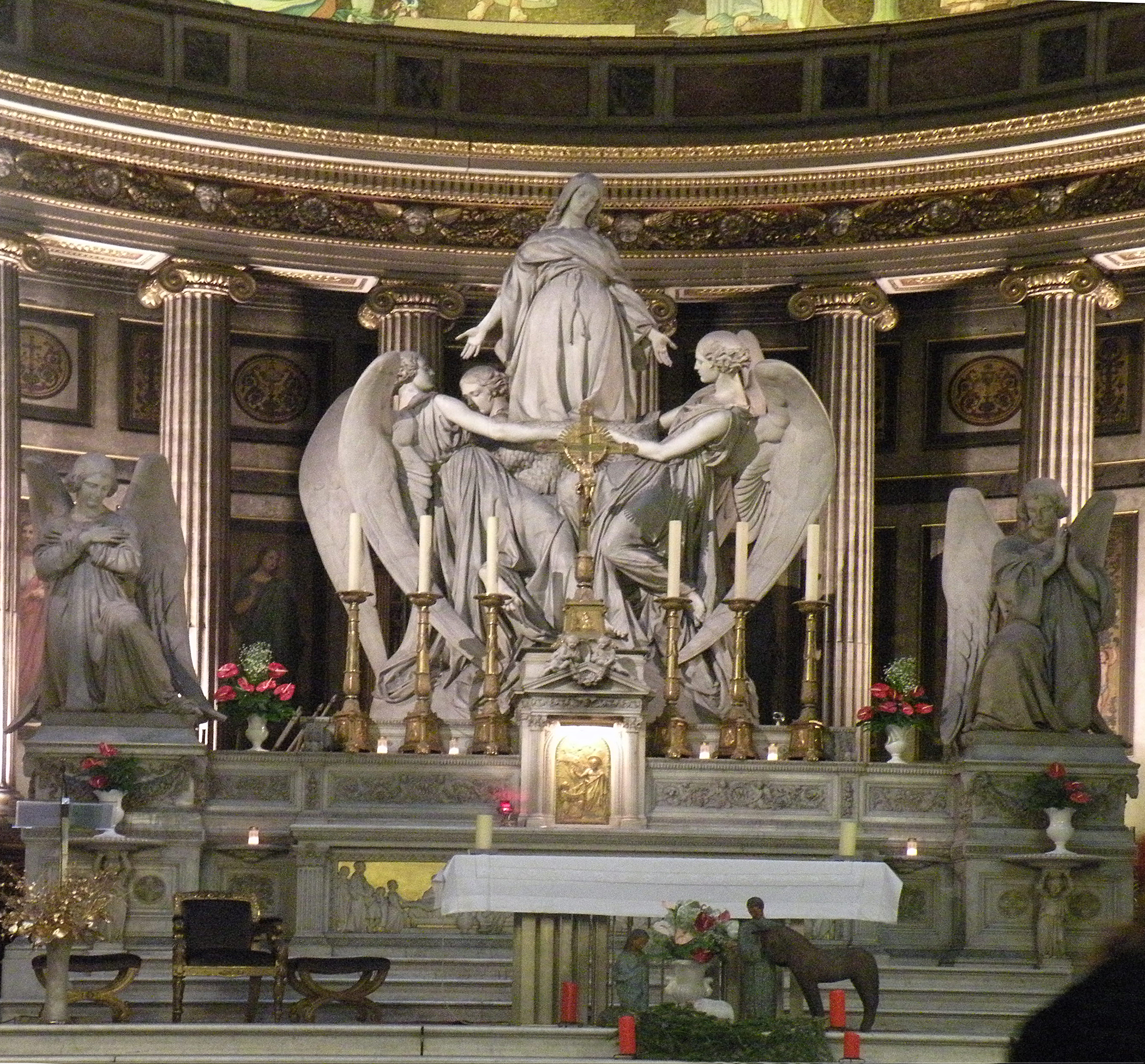
The Ecstasy of Mary Magdalene by Carlo Marochetti

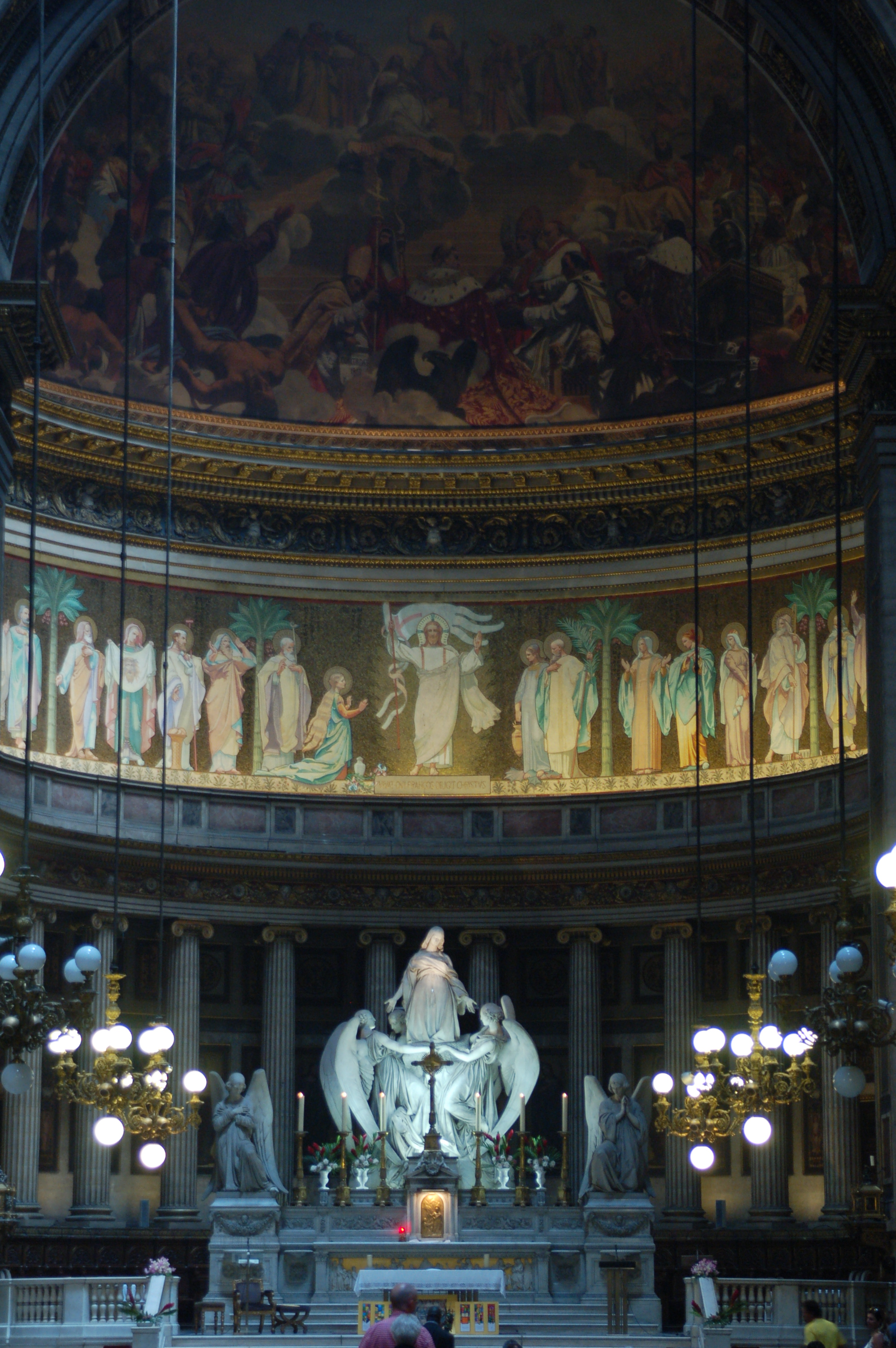
Christianity of France mosaic

Below the History of Christianity and above the altar is later, unusual work; a wide ceramic mosaic depicting Christ with a group of Saints who had connections with France. This was conceived between 1888 and 1893 by Father LeRebours, the curate of the church, and is in the Neo-Byzantine style, very different from the rest of the art in the choir. It was painted by Charles-Joseph Lameire, and transformed into ceramic by the Sevres Porcelain workshops in Paris. In the dim light inside of the church, the gilded ceramic tiles catch the light, sometimes making it the most visible art work in the church.

The Christ of the Resurrection is the central figure in the mosaic, accompanied by the first disciples and missionaries who lived and preached in Gaul, including the patron saint of the church, Mary Magdalene; Saint Martha, sister of Mary Magdalene, buried in Tarascon; Saint Lazare, who founded the first church in Marseille; Saint Genevieve, patron saint of Paris; Saint Trophyme, a disciple of Saint Paul and founder of the church in Arles. The figure of Saint Front of Perigeaux, founder of the church in Rocamadour, who is given the features of the artist, Lameire); Saint Ursin, founder of the church in Bourges, who is given the features of the architect Charles Garnier, and others.

Below the mosaic is a row of Corinthian columns which form a theatrical background behind the altar. and a marble stairway leading up to the altar. Behind the altar is a monumental sculpture, The Ecstasy of Mary Magdalene, by Carlo Marochetti (1805–1868), depicting Mary Magdalene, kneeling in prayer, as she is transported into heaven by three angels.

=== Sculpture in the Vestibule – The Baptism of Christ ===
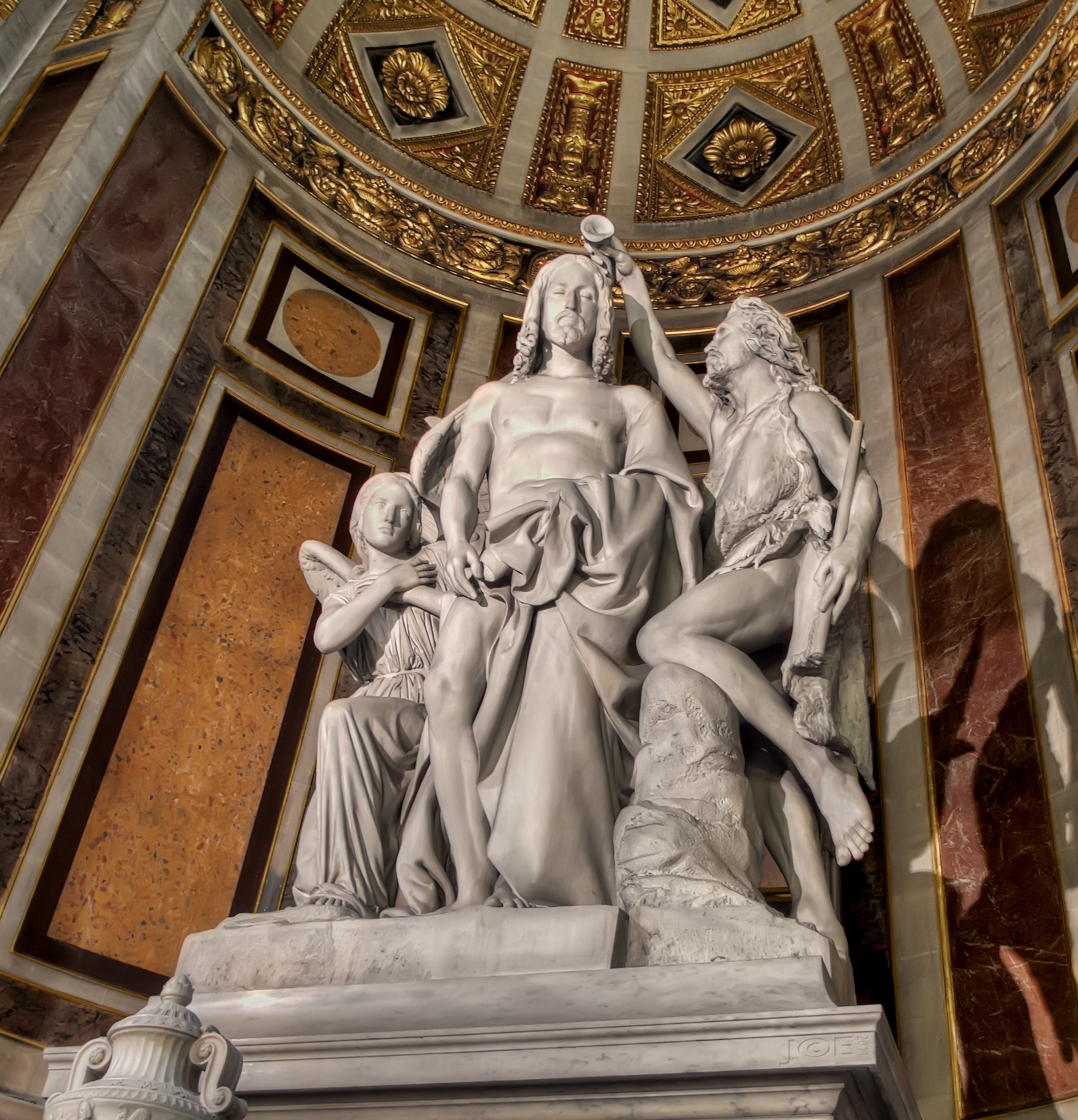
The Baptism of Christ by François Rude

In the vestibule at the south end of the church, is another monumental sculpture, The Baptism of Christ by François Rude (1784–1855). Rude was already famous for a work he made in 1836, "The Departure of the Volunteers of 1795", prominently featured on the Arc de Triomphe.

=== Decoration ===
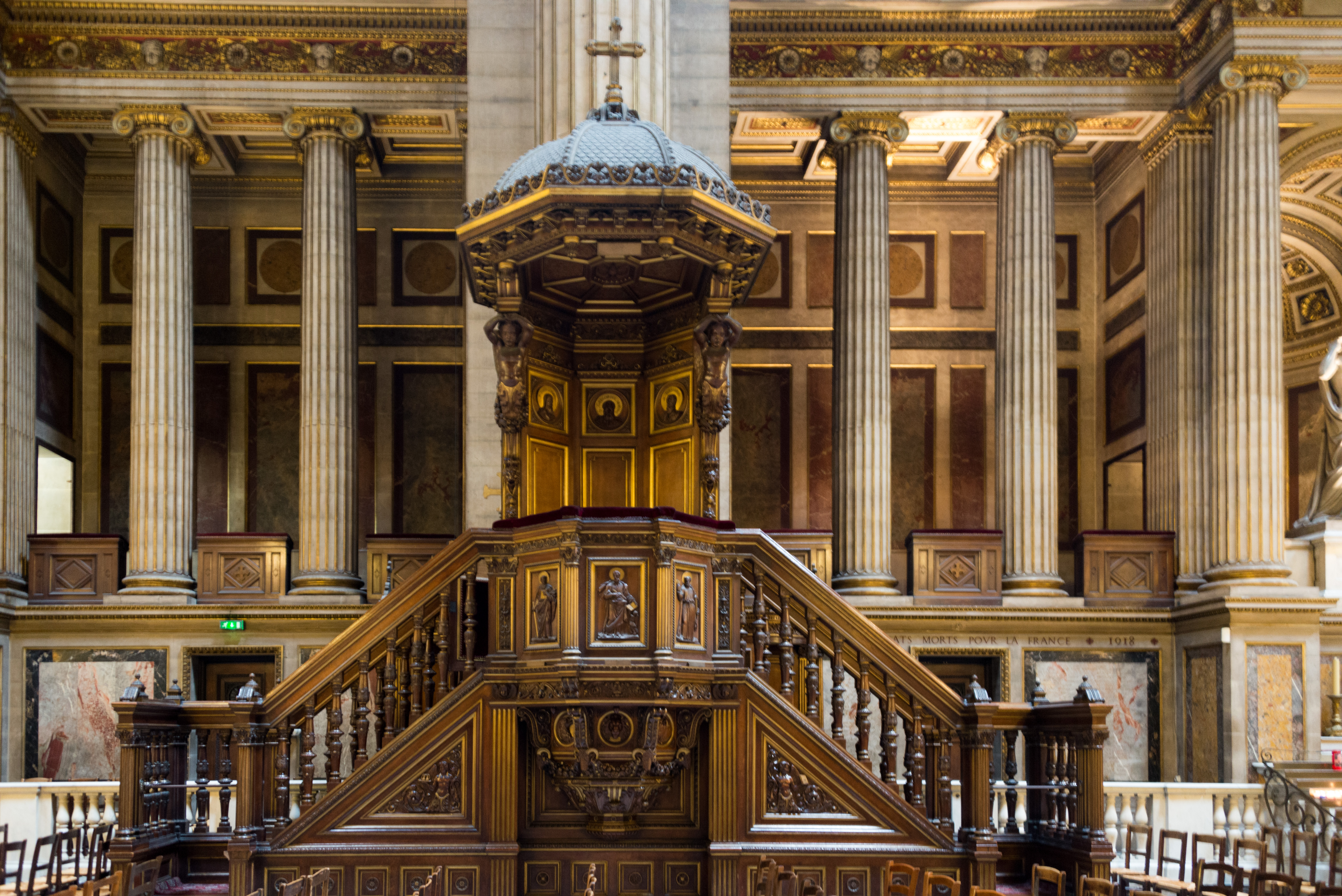
The pulpit in the nave

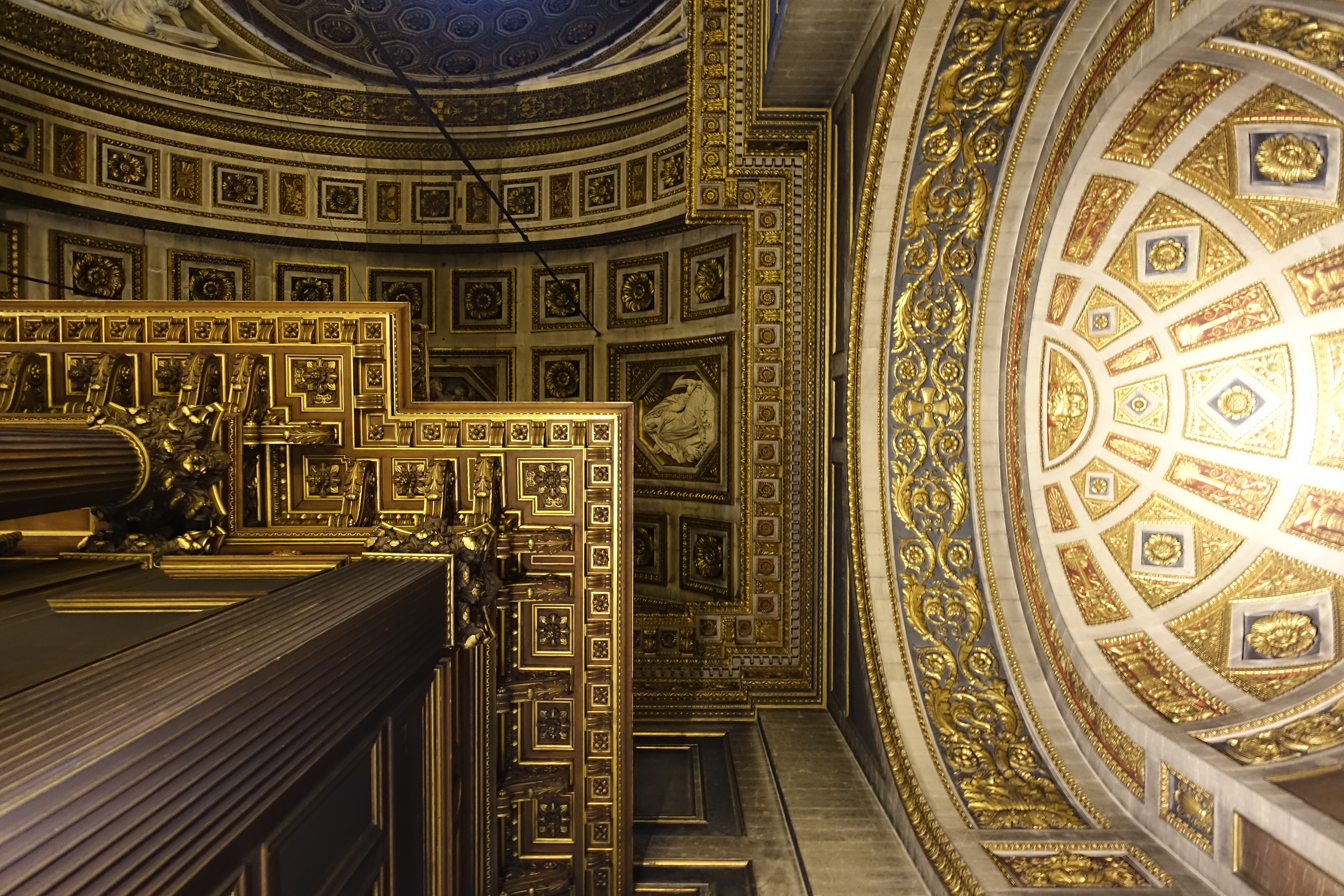
Detail of the ceiling vaults

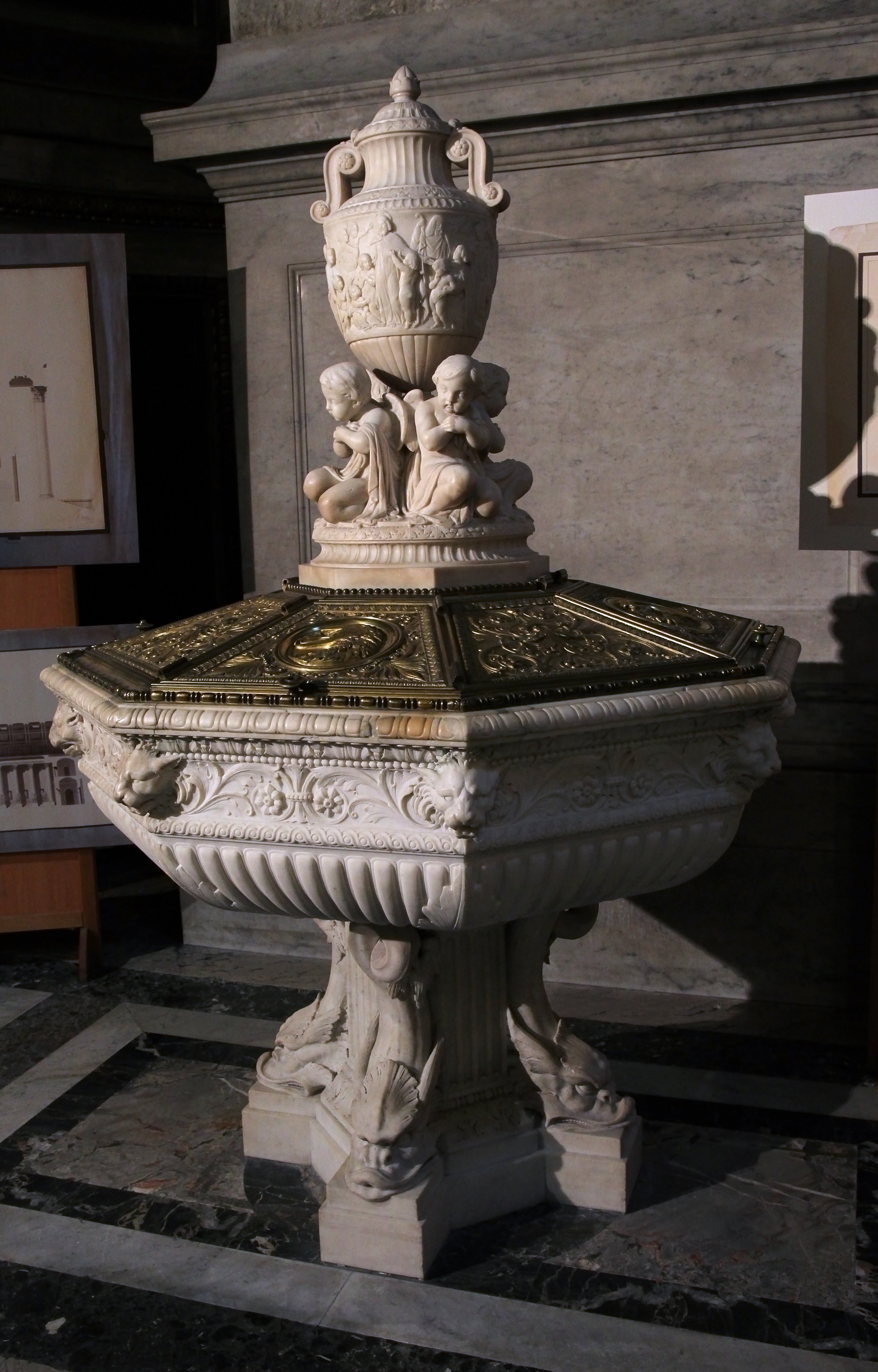
Baptismal font

The decoration of the interior was completed in a relatively short period, under King Louis-Philippe, and is noted for its unusual harmony.

== Music ==
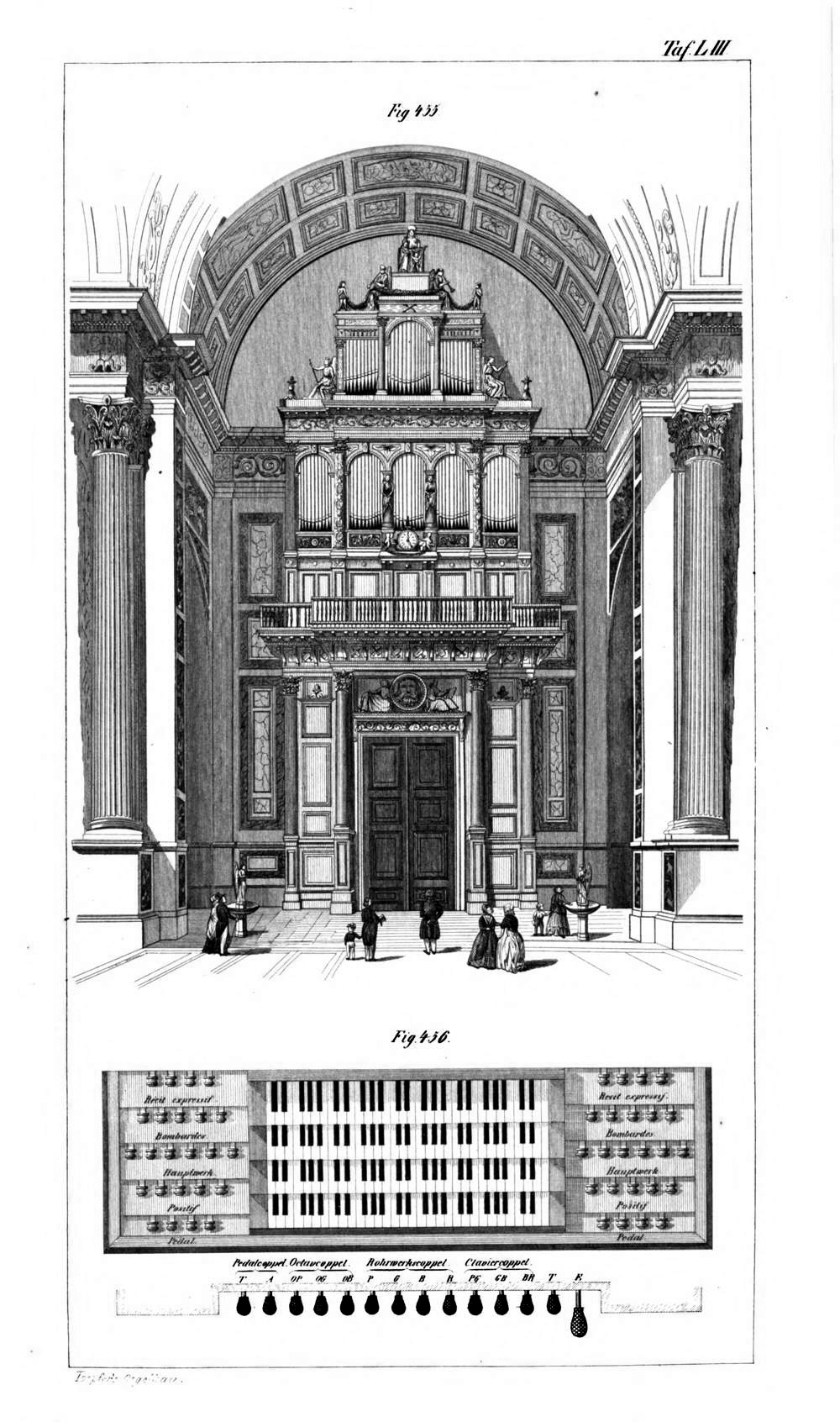
The organ and schematic of its console (1855)

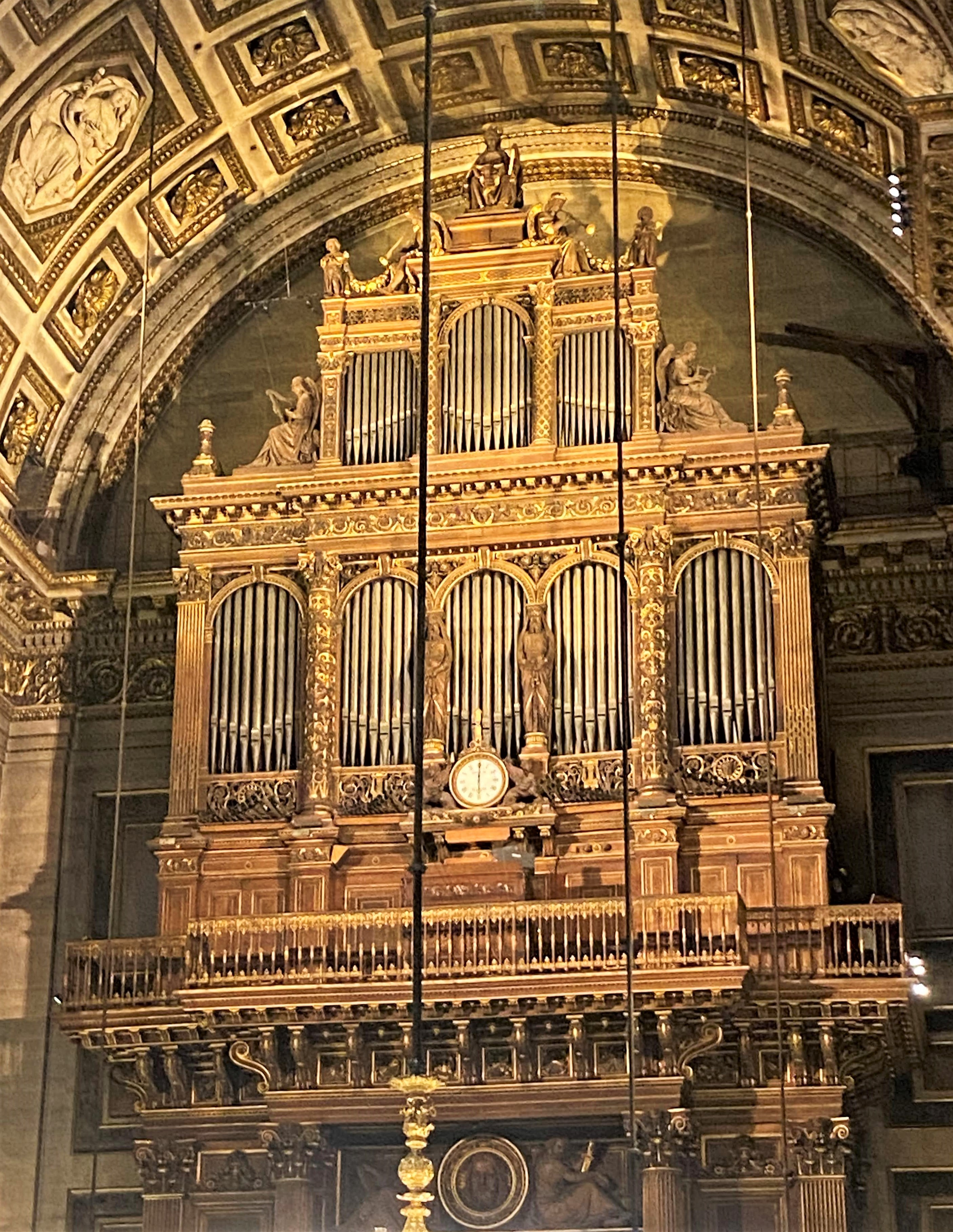
The grand organ in the tribune

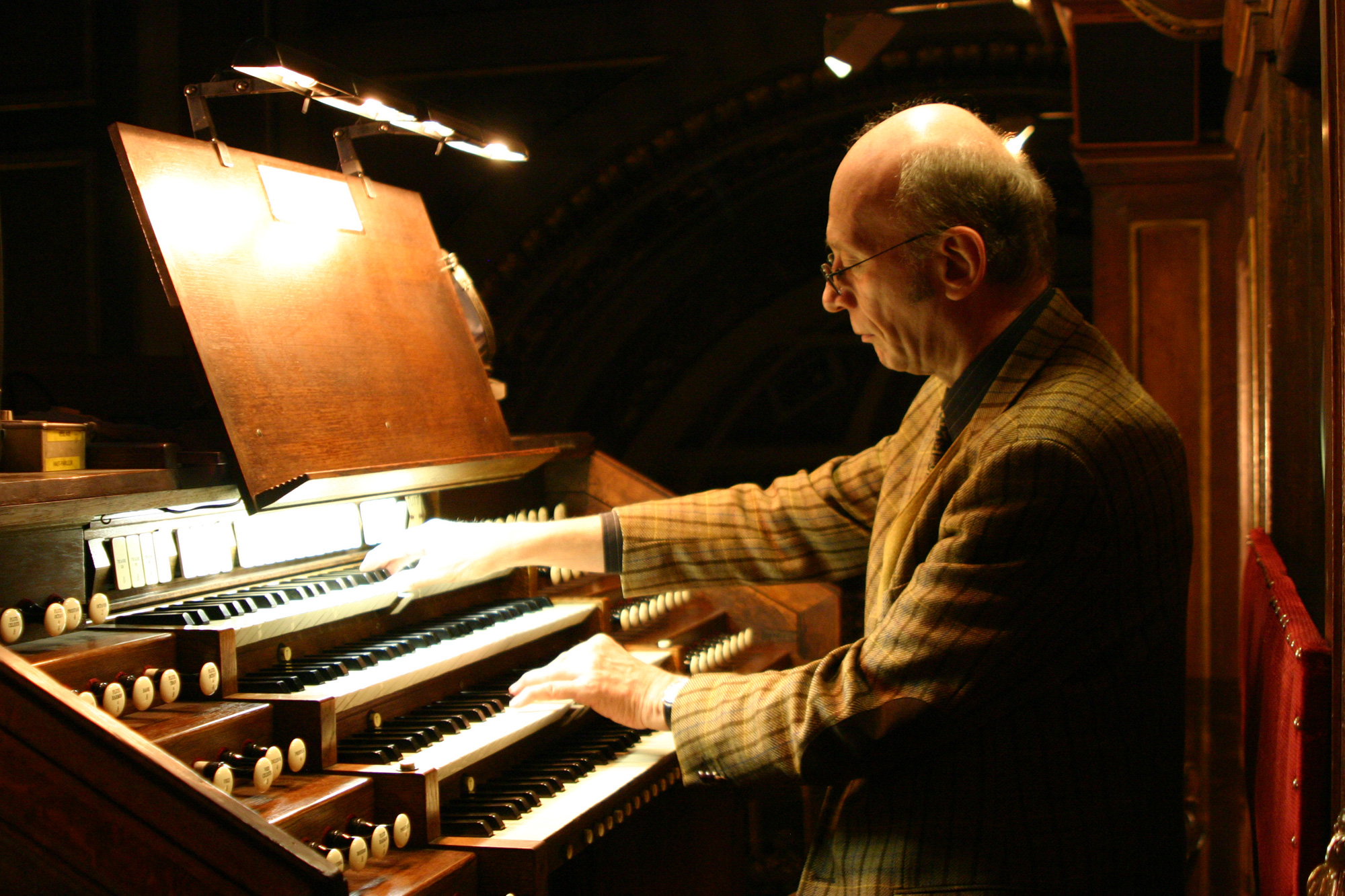
François-Henri Houbart, the church's current titular organist, playing the instrument in 2011

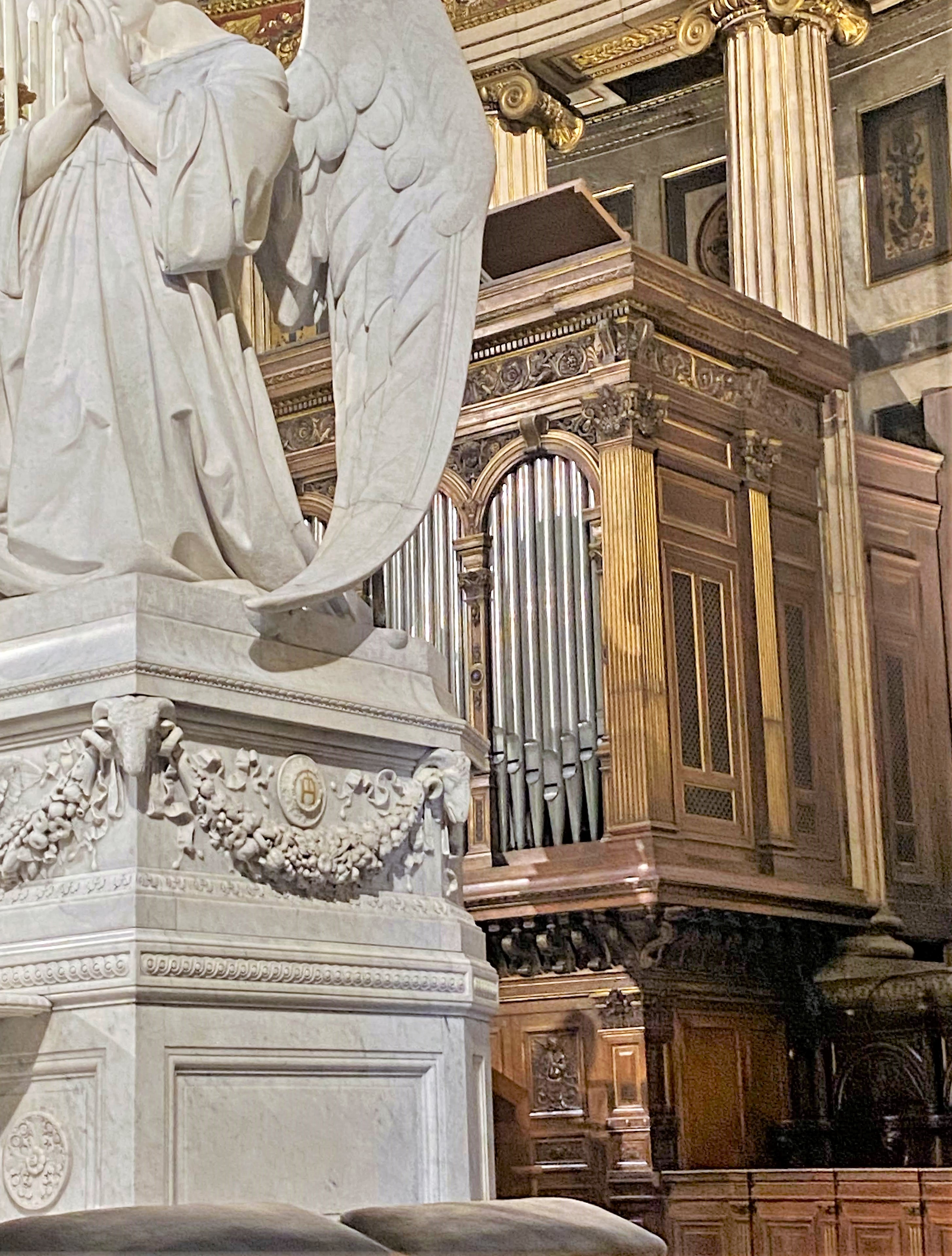
The choir organ behind the altar

The church has had a long association with music and musicians. The funeral of Frédéric Chopin took place in the church, and the composers Camille Saint-Saëns, Théodore Dubois and Gabriel Fauré served as the church's titular organist. The church's famous pipe organ, located in the tribune over the south entrance to the church, is housed in an elaborate case with sculpted angels, spires, and other ornaments harmonised with the décor. Originally built by Aristide Cavaillé-Coll in 1845, it was restored by his successor Charles Mutin in 1927, who also extended the manuals to 56 notes. Tonal modifications were carried out by Roethinger, Gonzalez-Danion, and Dargassies in 1957, 1971 and 1988 respectively. A smaller, contemporaneous organ is located in the choir.

=== Titular organists ===
- 1842–1846 Charles-Alexandre Fessy
- 1847–1858 Alfred Lefébure-Wély
- 1858–1877 Camille Saint-Saëns
- 1877–1896 Théodore Dubois
- 1896–1905 Gabriel Fauré
- 1905–1934 Henri Dallier
- 1935–1962 Édouard Mignan
- 1962–1968 Jeanne Demessieux
- 1969–1979 Odile Pierre
- 1979– François-Henri Houbart

Additionally, since 2011, Olivier Périn has served as assistant titular organist to François-Henri Houbart.

== Foyer ==
The church's basement (entrance on the Flower Market side) has the Foyer de la Madeleine. Typical of various foyers run by religious and civic groups throughout France, it is the home of a restaurant in which, for a yearly subscription fee, one can dine under vaulted ceilings on a three-course French meal served by volunteers for a nominal price. Its walls are often decorated by local artists.

== See also ==
- List of works by James Pradier Sculptures in La Madeleine
- List of historic churches in Paris
- List of tourist attractions in Paris

== Bibliography (In French) ==
- Dumoulin, Aline; Ardisson, Alexandra; Maingard, Jérôme; Antonello, Murielle; Églises de Paris (2010), Éditions Massin, Issy-Les-Moulineaux, ISBN 978-2-7072-0683-1
