= François-Henri Houbart =

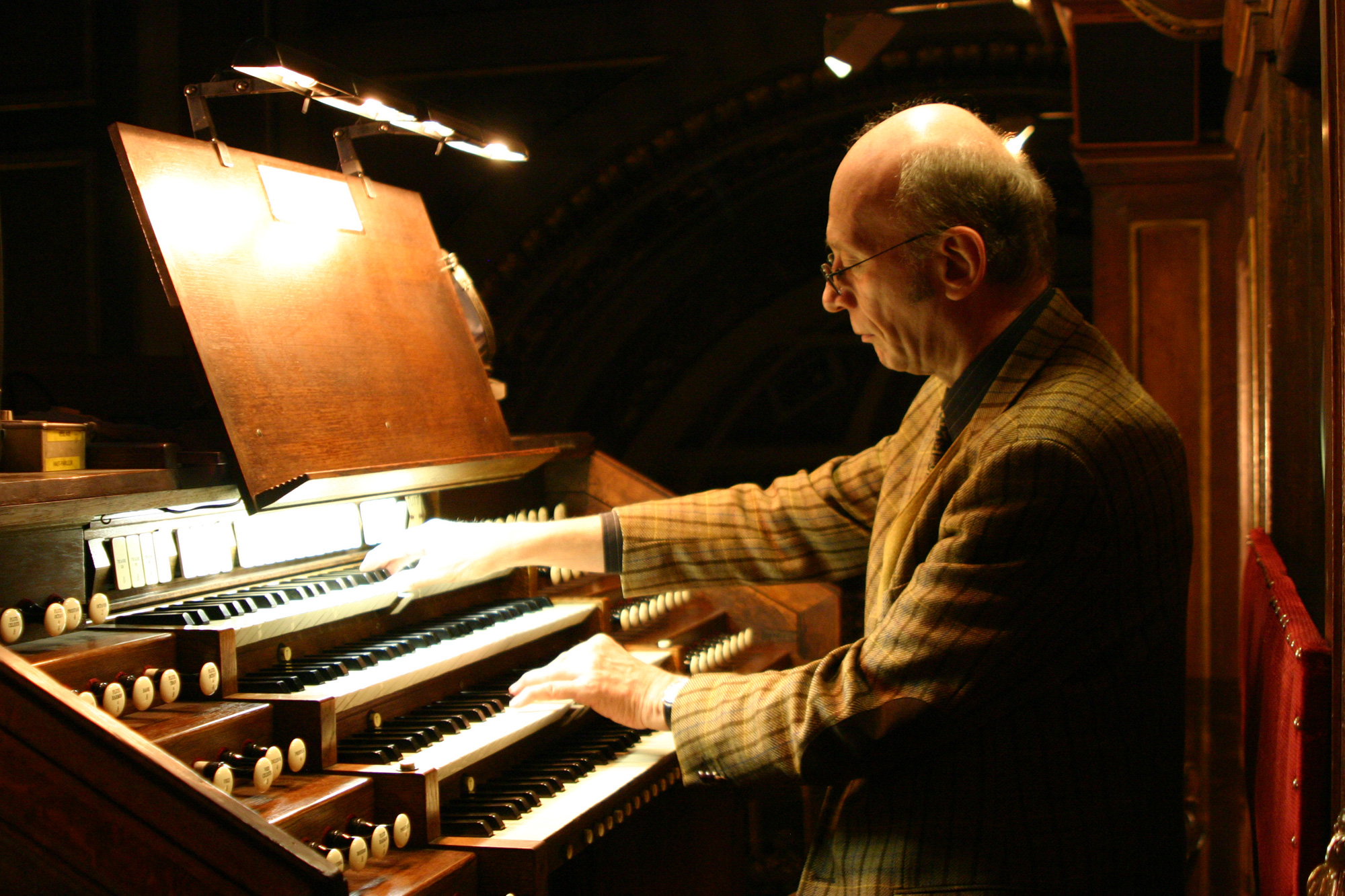
Houbart playing the organ of the Église de la Madeleine, 2011

François-Henri Jacques-Marie Robert Houbart (born 26 December 1952) is a French church and concert organist, improviser, composer and pedagogue. Often considered one of France's finest organists, Houbart has served as titular organist of the Église de la Madeleine in Paris since 1979, succeeding Odile Pierre. Since 2011, he has been assisted in his titularship by Olivier Périn.

== Biography ==
Born in Orléans in the Loiret department, Houbart first began studying piano at the age of seven and then took organ lessons starting at the age of eleven while studying with the Dominican Order in Sorèze.

He later received his musical education from Michel Chapuis, Suzanne Chaisemartin, Pierre Lantier, Jean Guillou and Pierre Cochereau. He has served as titular organist of the main organ at the Église de la Madeleine in Paris since 1979 (succeeding Odile Pierre), and taught organ at the Orléans Academy of Music from 1980 to 2000 (succeeding Marie-Claire Alain). He is also an organ soloist with Radio France.

A renowned improviser, Houbart has given over 1,300 recitals across three continents: Asia, North America and Europe, where improvisation is a large factor in his recitals. Additionally, he has written two essays regarding the grand organ of Orléans Cathedral in his hometown.

In January 2018, he was nominated for a Grammy Award owing to his participation in an album with the works of Nadia Boulanger, recorded at La Madeleine.

Houbart has been awarded the rank of officer in the Ordre des Arts et des Lettres and is also a recipient of the Médaille de Vermeil de la Ville de Paris.
