= Menzies =

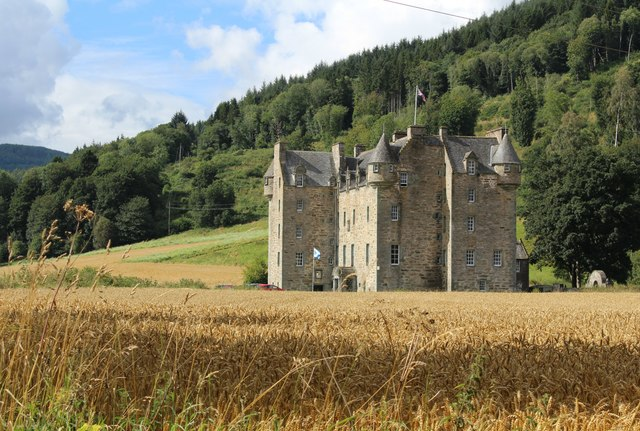
Castle Menzies, Perthshire

Menzies is a Scottish surname. It is traditionally pronounced /ˈmɪŋɪs/ or /ˈmɪŋɪz/, although the spelling pronunciation /ˈmɛnziːz/ is also heard, especially outside of Scotland.

The name is ultimately of French origin, deriving from the village of Mesnières in Normandy (which makes it a doublet of the English surname Manners, borne by the Dukes of Rutland). The earliest bearer of the name in Scotland was Robert de Meyners (d. 1267), who served as chamberlain to King Alexander III. His descendants established themselves at Weem in Perthshire, building Castle Menzies. Their name was rendered in Gaelic as Mac Mèinn or Mèinnearach, the former of which is the source of the surname McMinn.

Early forms of the name include Meigners, Meignes and Menȝes. The medial digraph in each of these forms represents the voiced palatal nasal, which was found in Early Scots in words of French and Gaelic origin. This sound later developed into /nj/, /ŋj/ or /ŋ/, hence the modern pronunciation of the name. The modern spelling reflects substitution of ⟨z⟩ for the obsolete letter yogh, as in names like Dalziel and Finzean.

== People with the surname ==
- Alan W. C. Menzies (1877–1966), Scots-born chemist and professor of chemistry at Princeton University
- Alex Menzies (midfielder), Scottish football player
- Alex Menzies (forward) (1882–1964), Scottish international football player
- Archibald Menzies (1754–1842), British medic and biologist; ship's doctor and naturalist on board George Vancouver's voyage to the North Pacific
- Beryl Menzies (married name Beryl Fowler, 1881–1963), English painter
- Cameron Menzies (born 1989), Scottish darts player
- Charles Menzies (anthropologist)
- Sir Charles Menzies (1783–1866), Royal Marines officer
- Dane Menzies (born 2005), New Zealand snowboarder
- Danni Menzies, British presenter of A Place in the Sun
- David Menzies (1873–1936), Scottish football player and manager
- Diane Menzies, New Zealand landscape architect
- Douglas Menzies (1907–1974), Justice of the High Court of Australia
- Finlay Menzies (born 2005), Scottish para-athlete
- Frederick Menzies (1875–1949), British physician
- Gavin Menzies (1937–2020), British retired submarine captain and author
- George Menzies (1930–2016), New Zealand rugby league footballer
- Gina Menzies, Irish media personality
- Heather Menzies (1949–2017), Canadian actress
- Henry Menzies (rugby union) (1867–1938), Scottish rugby player
- Hugh Menzies (1857–1925), Australian politician
- Ivan Menzies (1896–1985), singer and actor
- James Menzies (disambiguation)
- John Menzies (disambiguation)
- Karen Menzies (born 1962), Australian footballer
- Karl Menzies (born 1977), Australian cyclist
- Mark Menzies (born 1971), British politician
- Marvin Menzies (born 1961), American college basketball coach
- Neal Menzies (born 1959), Australian professor of soil science
- Peter Menzies Jr., Australian cinematographer
- Ralph Menzies (1958–2025), American murderer
- Robert Menzies (1894–1978), Australia's longest-serving prime minister
- Sadie Menzies (1914–1996), founder member of the Revolutionary Workers Group
- Sharon Menzies, 21st century New Zealand financier
- Steve Menzies (born 1973), Australian rugby league player
- Stewart Menzies (1890–1968), Head of British Secret Intelligence Service 1939–1952
- Ted Menzies (born 1952), Canadian politician
- Tobias Menzies (born 1974), British actor
- William Cameron Menzies (1896–1957), American film director

== See also ==
- Clan Menzies, Scottish clan
- Mingus (disambiguation), pronounced similarly
