= Media Arts & Communications Academy =

Location
- 1330 NE Cowls St; McMinnville, Yamhill County, Oregon 97128; United States
- Coordinates: 45.219362°N 123.192508°W

Information
- Type: Public charter
- Opened: 2007
- School district: McMinnville School District
- Principal: Jim Pierce
- Grades: 9-12
- Enrollment: 257
- Colors: Green, blue
- Athletics conference: OSAA Pacific Conference 6A-5
- Mascot: Grizzlies
- Website: www.schools.msd.k12.or.us/MACA/index.html

Media Arts and Communications Academy (or MACA) was a charter school located in McMinnville, Oregon, United States. MACA was a small, tech focused, college preparatory high school option for McMinnville School District students.

== History ==
Media Arts and Communications Academy opened in 2007 as a part of Oregon's Small School Initiative.

In March 2011, the McMinnville School District officially decided to make MACA a "pathway school" and merge it with McMinnville High School (MHS). The move was said to save the district around $350,000.

Students now study visual and broadcast communications through the MHS career pathways programs at McMinnville High School.

== Academics ==
In June 2010 MACA graduated its first high school class, in which 27 students received a high school diploma.

== Athletics ==
Students from the Media Arts and Communications Academy compete as a part of McMinnville High School athletics.
