= Abel Decaux =

French organist and composer

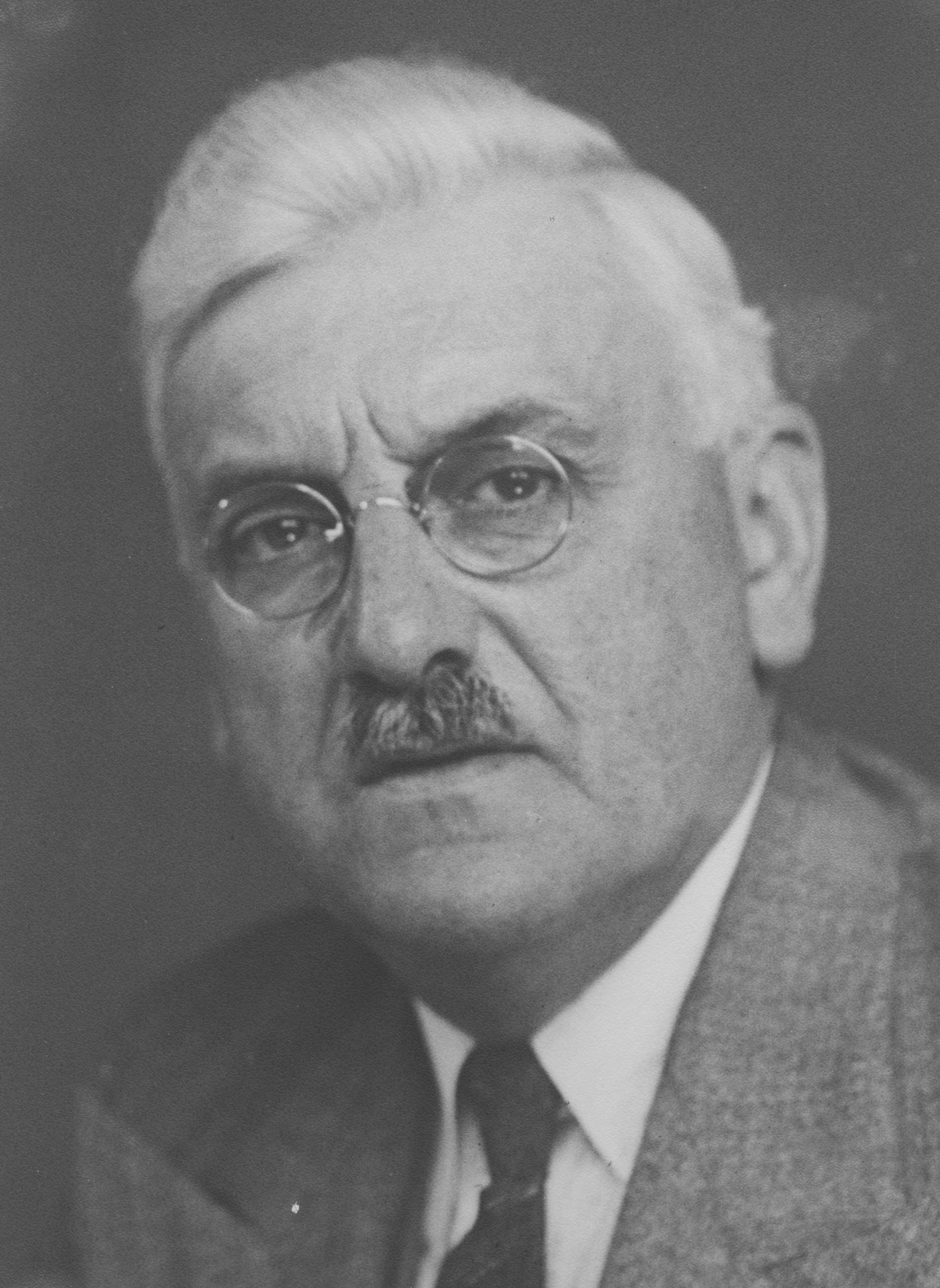
Decaux (c. 1923)

Abel-Marie Alexis Decaux (11 February 1869 – 19 March 1943) was a French organist, composer, and pedagogue, best known for his piano suite Clairs de lune, some of the earliest pieces of dodecaphony.

A student of Théodore Dubois, Jules Massenet, and Charles-Marie Widor, among others, he was the titular organist of the grand organ of the Sacré-Cœur basilica. Decaux was more renowned as a player and professor during his lifetime than a composer.

He is popularly known as the "French Schoenberg".

== Biography ==
Abel-Marie Alexis Decaux was born at 03:00 in Auffay (Seine-Maritime; then named Seine-Inférieure). He was the second son of Louis-Émile Decaux, (Note: Born 5 April 1831 in Mesnil-Mauger; died in 1903 in Aumale.) a mayoral secretary, teacher, and school principal; and Aimé Désiré Picard. (Note: Born 27 May 1832 in Mesnières-en-Bray; died in 1926.) His parents married on 17 September 1855 in Mesnières-en-Bray.

From his earliest years, he began to display artistic tendencies. His elder brother, Alexis (Note: Born 13 August 1856 in Auffay.) then tutored him in the basics of music. Alexis, an amateur composer, would later publish a pedagogical book on pianism in 1885 and followed in his father's footsteps, eventually becoming mayor of Auffay. However, Abel also had aspirations of becoming a sailor; an idea ultimately quashed by his father.

Decaux then moved to study in Rouen at its cathedral's Maîtrise Saint-Evode. He studied harmony in an unusual manner: corresponding with a professor in Paris, Garnier-Marchand. The latter would later become the dedicatee of Decaux's first work. After graduating in 1890, he moved to the nation's capital to study at its conservatory, studying there until 1895 (a scholarship was granted to him in 1893), but not graduating. His teachers were:

- Charles-Wilfrid de Bériot, piano
- Théodore Dubois and Albert Lavignac, harmony
- Charles Lenepveu, counterpoint and fugue
- Jules Massenet, composition
- Charles-Marie Widor, organ

He would later befriend Alexandre Guilmant, organist at the Sainte-Trinité who he continued studying the organ with. As a result, Widor and Guilmant nominated Decaux to fill in the post of junior organ professor at the Schola Cantorum, which he also cofounded. Books he had used included the Barnes method; his pupils remembering him as a "strict, reasonable teacher". Decaux was also introduced to Déodat de Séverac, titular organist at the Bourg-la-Reine church, quickly forming an important friendship. He occasionally substituted for him on Fridays and Sundays.

On 23 June 1902, he married socialite Jeanne Félicie Marie Lescarcelle, (Note: Born 17 January 1880 in Breteuil, died 1961.) who apparently toughened his personality and made him focus on teaching. The following year, he was unanimously elected as titular organist of the Sacré-Cœur basilica by a jury that congratulated him, which included his colleagues Guilmant and Widor, as well as Louis Vierne, organist of Notre-Dame de Paris. His composition teacher Massenet died this year.

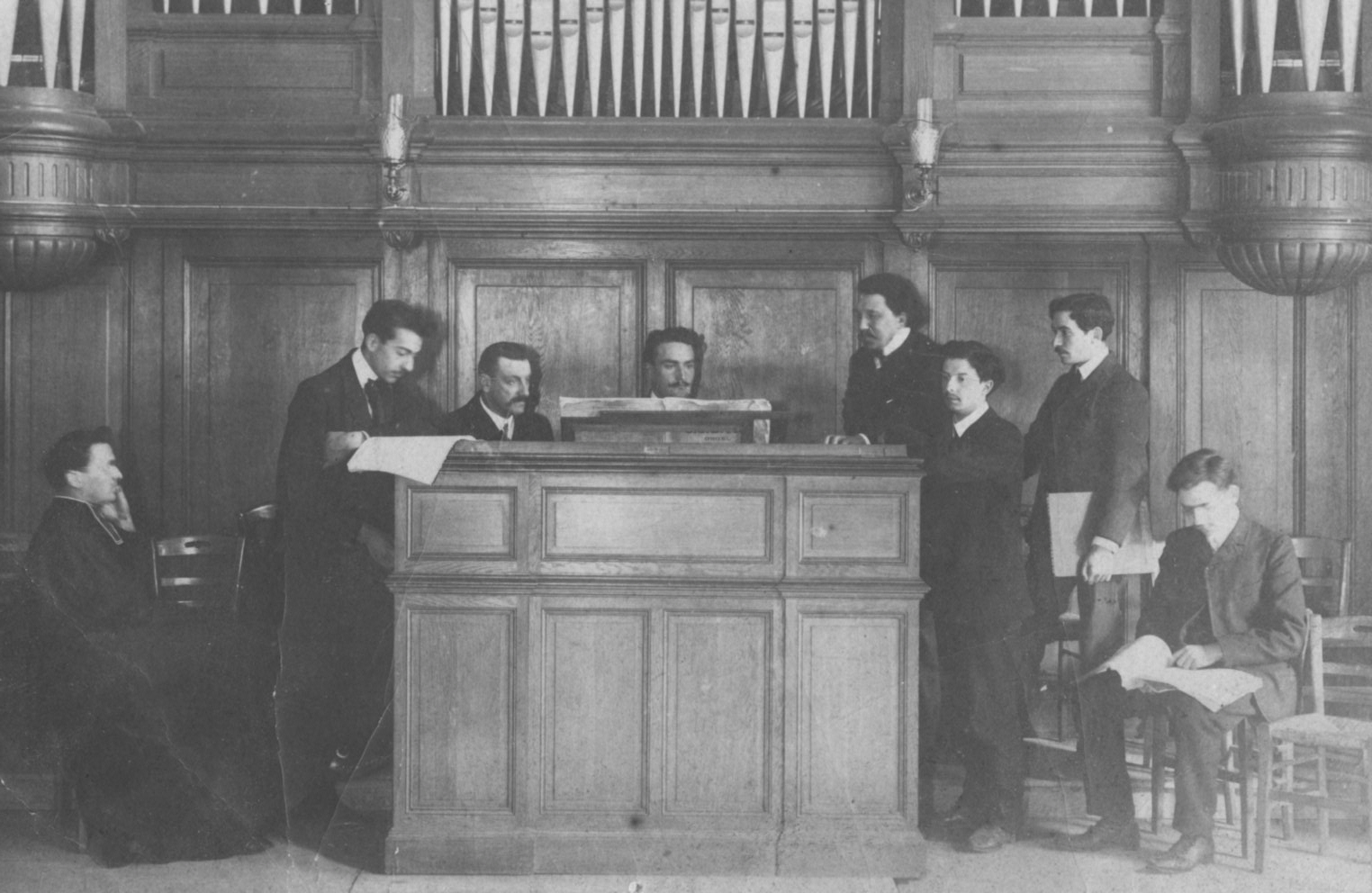
An organ lesson at the Schola Cantorum around 1900: Decaux is third from the left.

The following year, on 23 November, the Decaux couple delight as their only daughter, Marguerite Marie Louise, is born. It is also the year in which he released his best-known work, a piano suite, Clairs de lune ("Moonlights").

From 1914 to 1919, a new Cavaillé-Coll organ, with modifications by his successor Charles Mutin, was installed from the residence of Baron Albert de L'Espée in Ilbarritz. Widor, Decaux, and up-and-coming concert organist Marcel Dupré, who would later be considered the greatest organist of the 20th century, gave its inaugural concert on 16 October of the latter year. He then left for the United States to teach organ at the Eastman School of Music in Rochester, New York in 1923, while still keeping his titular position. His predecessor was Joseph Bonnet. However, he resigned the titularship (through contract renewal with both parties) in 1926.

Decaux learned English (albeit with difficulty) in order to communicate with his students. His wife, however, did not. He would spend holidays in France.

In 1930, Decaux's daughter married Pierre Jean Pavie, (Note: Born 7 February 1905; died 10 April 1972 in Villiers-Saint-Denis.) choirmaster and organist at the Saint-Pierre-et-Saint-Paul church in Colombes on 15 July. They had four children.

Having been appointed by presidential edict as a Chevalier of the Légion d'honneur the preceding year (André Laboulaye, French ambassador to the United States had physically bestowed the medal upon him), he returned to his homeland in 1935, accepting a teaching position at the École César Franck, the successor of the Schola Cantorum (succeeding Vierne); and at the Institut Grégorien in Paris. The resignation was caused by, among other things, rivalries and hostile terms with colleagues, as well as his wife's dissatisfaction. The basilica's position would later be filled in by Ludovic Panel, his deputy. Decaux's failure to reoccupy the position (despite his protests) led to his appointment as titular of Saint-Joseph-des-Carmes with its 1902 Didier organ; in 1936.

Decaux died at his home, 284 Boulevard Raspail, in the 14th arrondissement of Paris at the age of 74 at 01:00 on 19 March 1943. He and his wife are buried in Aumale—the town also has a street bearing his name. His widow later died in 1961, with their daughter following on 23 May 1979.

== Music ==
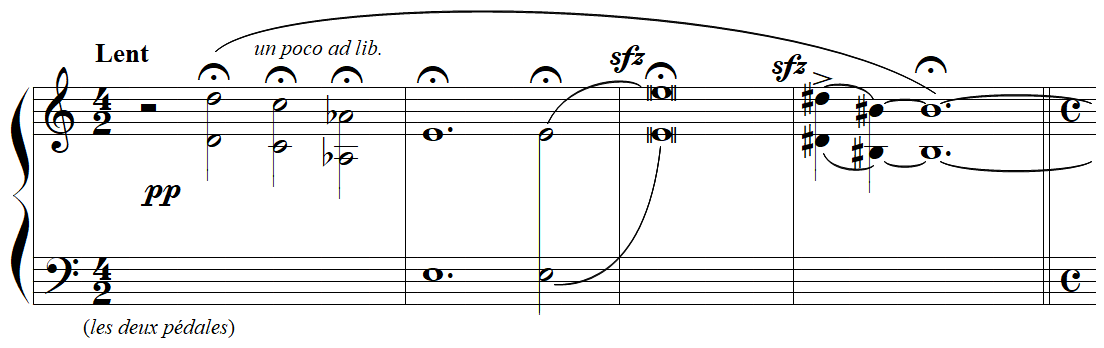
The opening of Clairs de lune

The body of music which Decaux wrote throughout his lifetime is considerably small; with only two pieces being published in his lifetime. His fame mainly stems from his piano suite Clairs de lune, written between 1900 and 1907 and published in 1913. It is remarkably modern for its time, anticipating both Claude Debussy and Arnold Schoenberg. He later received the nickname "The French Schoenberg" from his contemporaries.

=== Compositions ===
==== Piano ====
- Variations brillantes sur Ah ! Vous dirai-je, maman (unpublished)
- Clairs de lune (1913): Minuit passe (1900) – La Ruelle (1902) – Le Cimetière (1907) – La Mer (1903)

Clairs de lune was supposed to have a fifth piece, La Forêt. Its sketches still survive, but this project was abandoned.

==== Organ ====
- Fughetta in D minor on Ave maris stella (1914; published in Maîtres contemporains de l'orgue)

==== Vocal music ====
- La lune blanche with piano accompaniment (1899): after Paul Verlaine

== Pupils ==
The years refer to their periods of tutelage under Decaux.

- Marguerite Béclard d'Harcourt (c. 1898)
- René Bürg (1920–1923)
- Henri Gagnebin (1908–1909)
- Jesús Guridi (1904–1905)
- Auguste Le Guennant
- Éliane Lejeune-Bonnier (1939)
- Omer Létourneau (1919–1920)
- Pierre Pavie (later his son-in-law; c. 1910)
- Paule Piedelièvre
- Noëlie Pierront (c. 1910)
- Marc de Ranse (1897–1898)
- Félix Raugel
- Yvonne Rokseth
- Adrien Rougier (c. 1917)
- Maurice Sergent
- Édouard Souberbielle (c. 1917)

== Bibliography ==
- Dictionnaire de la Musique française, Larousse, 1988.
- Dictionnaire de la Musique, Marc Honegger, Bordas.
- Dictionnaire de la musique contemporaine, Claude Rostand, Larousse.
- Pierre Guillot (dir.), Bruxelles, Mardaga, 2003 (ISBN 978-2-87009-840-0)
- Déodat de Séverac et Pierre Guillot (éditeur scientifique), Sprimont, Mardaga, 2002 (ISBN 2-87009-779-4)
- (en) Stanley Sadie (dir.), vol. 5, Oxford, Oxford University Press
- (en) Baker's Biographical Dictionary of Musicians, 7th edition.
- Guide de la musique de piano, Fayard.
- Guide de la musique d'orgue, Fayard.
- Gisèle Brelet, « », RMS (revue musicale suisse), May/June 1961
- Éliane Lejeune-Bonnier, "Abel Decaux", L'Orgue, n^{o} 210, 1989
- Henri Gagnebin, « Grands Organistes que j'ai connus : A. Decaux, un professeur admirable », L'Orgue, n^{o} 129, 1969
- Daniel Roth, « Le Grand Orgue du Sacré-Cœur de Montmartre à Paris », La flûte harmonique « numéro spécial », 1985
- Michel Fleury, « Abel Decaux, un Schönberg français ? », La Lettre du Musicien, n^{o} 4 « supplément piano hors série », août 1990
- Henry-Abel Simon, Annuaire Général de la Musique, 1888
