= Montserrat Torrent =

Spanish organist (born 1926)

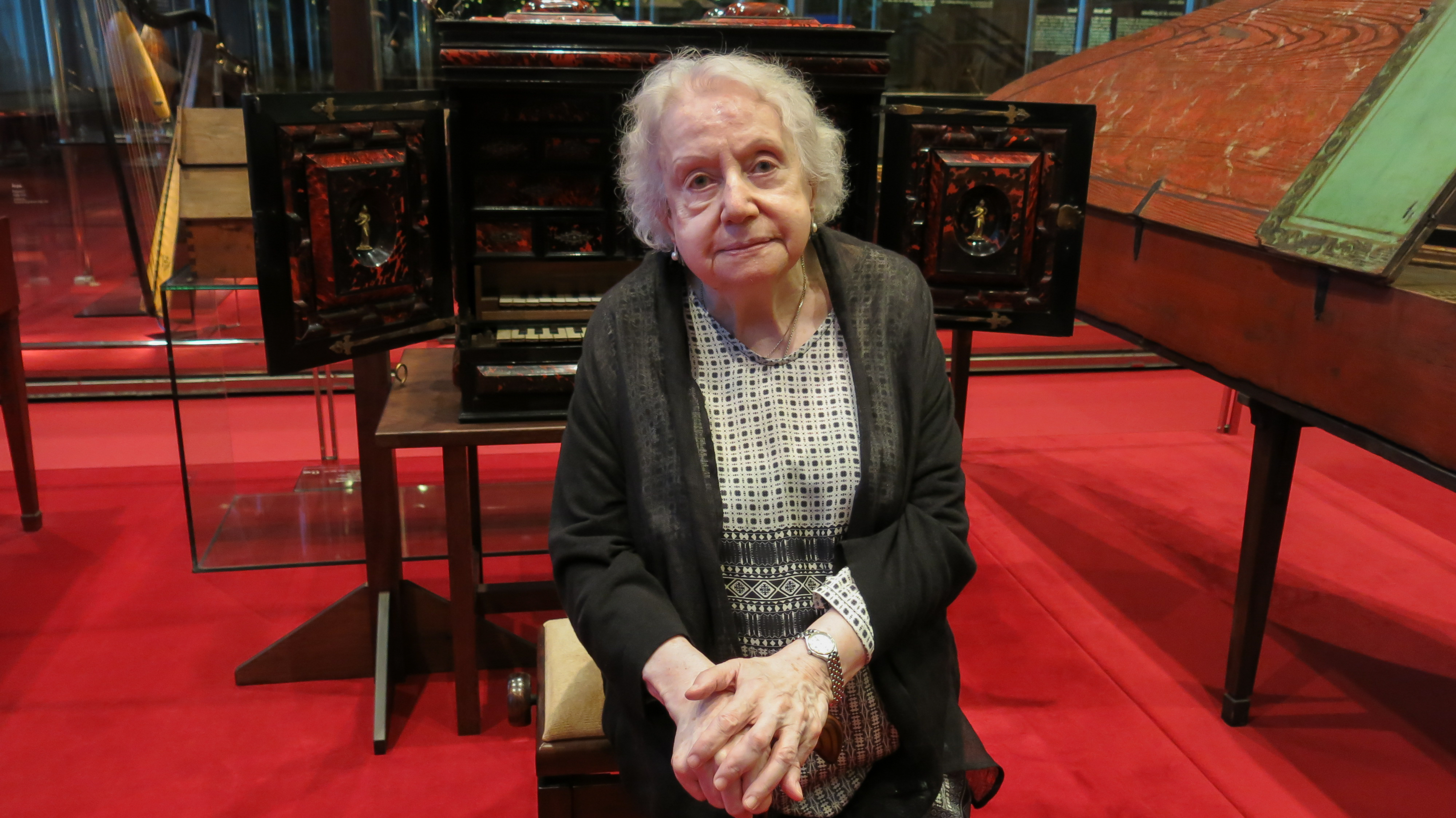
Torrent at the Museu de la Música de Barcelona (3 September 2015)

Montserrat Torrent i Serra (born 17 April 1926) is a Spanish organist.

== Biography ==
Born in Barcelona in 1926, she started her musical studies as a pianist with her mother who was pupil of Enrique Granados. She studied under Frank Marshall (1883–1959) at the Academia Marshall in Barcelona, and also attended the Conservatorio Superior Municipal de Música de Barcelona.

Later, she studied in París (with Noëlie Pierront), thanks to a scholarship grant from Institut Français; and in Siena (with Ferdinando Germani and Helmuth Rilling), granted by Fundación Juan March.

Torrent was later appointed as organ teacher at Conservatorio Municipal de Barcelona. She started her career performing in Europe, United States of America and South America, focusing on the organ as a popular music instrument.

In 1962, she founded the Organ Friends Association (Associació d'Amics de l'Orgue), with the aim of publicizing organ music and preserving historic organs in Spain. She also worked together with Ars Musicae de Barcelona, a group of pioneers of early music and period performance of Spanish and European music.

== Awards ==
Montserrat Torrent has been awarded with the following distinctions:

- Grand Prix du Disque "Charles Cros" for her recording of music of Cabanilles (1965).
- Creu de Sant Jordi from the Catalan Government (1995).
- Académica correspondiente at Real Academia de Bellas Artes de Granada (1995).
- Medalla de Plata del Mérito Artístico de Bellas Artes from Ministerio de Cultura (1996).
- Premio Nacional de Música (1996).
- Medalla al Mèrit Artístic d'or from Ajuntament de Barcelona (1997).
- Medalla del Real Conservatorio de Música de Madrid (2001).
- Medalla del Mérito al Trabajo "Francesc Macià" from Catalan Government (2001)
- Doctora Honoris Causa by the Universitat Autònoma de Barcelona (2008).

== Discography ==
- L'orgue del Vendrell (1965)
- Juan Cabanilles · Orgelwerk (1965)
- L'orgue de Maó (1967)
- Hispaniae Musica (1968)
- Música de la cort: segle XVI (1970)
- Obres per an orgue: Família Cabezón (1970)
- Música orgánica española de los siglos XVI y XVII (1970)
- Portugaliae musica (1971)
- Joan Cabanilles · Orgues de Mallorca (1975)
- Música española en el órgano de Mahón (1977)
- Montserrat Torrent en el órgano de la Bien Aparecida (1978)
- Orgue de Santa Maria de Badalona (1985)
- Organ Recital (1990)
- Libro de Tientos y discursos de música práctica, y teórica para Organo Vol. I (1991)
- Libro de Tientos y discursos de música práctica, y teórica para Organo Vol. II (1992)
- Compositors Catalans s. XVI-XIX (1994)
- P. Antòni Soler - 6 concerts per a dos teclats (1995)
- Montserrat Torrent Plays the Great Organ of Barcelona Cathedral (1995)
- Les Llibertats d'orgue del cicle de Nadal (1995)
- Libro de Tientos y discursos de música práctica, y teórica para Organo Vol. III (1996)
- L'esplendorós barroc (1997)
- Libro de Tientos y discursos de música práctica, y teórica para Organo Vol. IV (1999)
- El órgano en el camino de Santiago (1999)
- Tientos y Variaciones SS. XVI - XVII (1999)
- L'Orgue a Catalunya Història i actualitat (2000)
- Antología de organistas aragoneses del s. XVII (2001)
- El Organo de San Juan El Real de Caalatayud (2001)
- Maestros de Capilla del Monasterio de S. Lorenzo El Real del Escorial Antología Vol.1 Música para órgano (s. XVII) (2001)
- Antología Vol.2 Música para órgano (s. XVIII) P. Antonio Soler. Integral de órgano, I (2003)
- Antología Vol.3 Música para órgano (s. XVIII) P. Antonio Soler. Integral de órgano, II (2003)
- El Órgano del Monasterio de Santa María de las Huelgas de Valladolid (2007)
