= McMinnville =

McMinnville may refer to:

- McMinnville, Oregon, the county seat and largest city of Yamhill County, Oregon, United States
- McMinnville, Tennessee, the largest city in and the county seat of Warren County, Tennessee, United States

== See also ==
- McMinnville UFO photographs
- McMinnville and Manchester Railroad
- McMinnville School District
- McMinnville High School
- McMinnville Opera House
- McMinnville AVA
