= Madigan (disambiguation) =

Madigan refers to:

== People ==
- Amy Madigan (born 1950), American actress
- Betty Madigan (born 1930), American popular singer
- Catherine Madigan, New Zealand film producer
- Cecil Madigan (1889–1947), Australian explorer and geologist
- Charles Madigan (born 1949), American journalist and editor
- Colin Madigan (1921–2011), Australian architect
- Edward Rell Madigan (1936–1994), American politician from Illinois, congressman and Secretary of Agriculture
- Elvira Madigan (1867–1889), Danish ropedancer and trick rider, eponym of a film
- Frank Madigan (1908–1979), American law enforcement officer in the 1960s in California
- Josepha Madigan (born 1970), Irish Fine Gael politician
- Kathleen Madigan (born 1965), American television comedian
- Lisa Madigan (born 1966), American politician from Illinois, former Illinois state Attorney General, daughter of Michael Madigan
- Michael Madigan (born 1942), American politician from Illinois, former Speaker of the Illinois House of Representatives
- Robert Madigan (1942–2006), American politician from Illinois, Illinois State Senator
- Roger A. Madigan (1930–2018), American farmer, businessman, and politician from Pennsylvania
- Rosemary Madigan (1926–2019), Australian sculptor, stonecarver and woodcarver
- Slip Madigan (Edward Patrick Madigan) (1896–1966), American college football player at Notre Dame University
- Tony Madigan (1868–1954), American baseball player

== Other ==
- Madigan Army Medical Center
- Madigan, a 1968 film starring Richard Widmark
- Madigan (TV series), a 1972 television series based on the 1968 film
- Madigan, a character from the 1975 film Coonskin
- Madigan's Millions, 1969 Italian-Spanish movie starring Dustin Hoffman
- Madigan Men, a 2000 television series
- Ben Madigan Preparatory School at the Belfast Royal Academy
- Edward R. Madigan State Fish and Wildlife Area in Illinois, USA
