= Jean Bonfils =

Jean Bonfils may refer to:

- Jean Bonfils (bishop) (1930–2026), French Roman Catholic bishop
- Jean Bonfils (composer) (1921–2007), French organist, music educator, musicologist and composer
