= Grafted (film) =

2024 film by Sasha Rainbow

- Film poster
- Directed by: Sasha Rainbow
- Written by: Mia Maramara; Hweiling Ow; Lee Murray; Sasha Rainbow
- Produced by: Murray Francis; Leela Menon
- Starring: Joyena Sun; Jess Hong; Eden Hart; Jared Turner; Sepi Toa
- Music by: Lachlan Anderson
- Production companies: Propaganda; FluroBlack
- Distributed by: (Yet) Another Monster Company
- Release dates: 9 August 2024 (NZIFF); 12 September 2024 (New Zealand)
- Running time: 95 minutes
- Country: New Zealand
- Languages: English; Mandarin
- Box office: $264,335

Grafted is a 2024 New Zealand coming-of-age body horror film directed by Sasha Rainbow, and written by Mia Maramara, Hweiling Ow, Lee Murray, and Rainbow. The film stars Joyena Sun, Jess Hong, Eden Hart, Jared Turner, and Sepi Toa.

The film follows an awkward but brilliant Chinese student (Joyena Sun), who wins a scholarship into a prestigious New Zealand University to study medical research and attempts to finish an experiment begun by her late father.

Grafted premiered at the New Zealand International Film Festival on 9 August 2024, and was released in New Zealand on 12 September 2024.

== Plot ==
Wei is the only daughter of a single father named Liu who works in medical research in China. Both appear to suffer from a congenital birth defect on their face/neck. Wei's father seeks to develop a serum that enables instant regeneration of human skin tissue, thus simplifying the technology and skill needed to apply skin grafts. He uses himself as a test subject for the latest batch, but his skin grows uncontrollably. He tries to cut it out with a scalpel in front of Wei, but it doesn't work, Wei tries to save him, but he is eventually smothered to death.

Several years later, Wei is a college student continuing her father’s work using his incomplete notes. She ends up being taken in by a distant aunt Ling who moves her to her home in New Zealand. Wei also has a cousin named Angela ("Angie") who is a social-climber type and the complete opposite of Wei. Angie and her "mean girl" friends, Eve and Jasmin, make Wei’s life more difficult by treating her poorly and spreading cruel rumors, even if Jasmin shows far more compassion and kindness towards Wei than the others. Her only comfort is John, a severely disfigured, but empathetic, homeless man.

Wei is taken under the wing of her chemistry professor Paul, who gives her a position as a research assistant after realizing that her father's work could save him from losing a lucrative financial grant. The pair are unable to overcome a flaw in Wei's father's notes that prevents the new skin from binding properly, and Paul dismisses Wei from her post. In desperation, Wei steals corpse flowers from a nursery and uses them to successfully overcome the flaw.

With the aunt rarely home, Angie blames Wei for many of her problems and goes on to destroy a small shrine that Wei had set up to honor her father and ancestors. Wei and Angie get in a physical confrontation after Angie breaks a photo frame of Wei’s father. In part self-defense and part anger, Wei ends up killing Angie by stabbing her through the eye. In a panic, she resorts to cutting off her own face, removing Angie's, and using the perfected serum to bind it to her own body.

Assuming Angie's identity after chopping up and disposing of her remains, Wei learns that Paul has stolen her father's notes and intends to take all the credit for her own work. Eve unknowingly reveals to "Angie" that she and the professor have a sexual relationship, so Wei murders Eve with a power drill and replaces Angie's face with hers, also using blond hair dye and colored contact lenses to steal her identity. As "Eve", Wei is able to find the only sample of serum Paul possesses, though she is unable to recover the notes. She also exposes Paul as a sexual predator, destroying his academic career.

Jasmin comes over to visit Wei after the police discover the body of Angie's boyfriend Josh, who accidentally fell to his death after discovering that Wei was impersonating her cousin. When Jasmin stumbles across the frozen heads of Angie and Eve in her fridge, Wei uses plastic wrap to smother her. Paul then confronts Wei, having deduced that she is responsible for his public disgrace. He drunkenly mocks her, telling her that it barely took him an afternoon to figure out the serum.

Wei lies to Paul, stating that the missing sample is in her fridge. As soon as he goes to find it, she paralyzes him with an injection and proceeds to dose him with the same flawed batch that killed her father, watching as he is slowly swallowed up by his own skin. A nosy neighbor sees her standing over his body and alerts the police. Wei tries to run and finds John sleeping in the subway, asking him to hide her. In the process, the sample that was in her pocket shatters.

Months later, Ling follows a girl that she mistakes for Wei, then encounters an old homeless woman wrapped in John's blanket. To her horror, the woman is actually Wei, now merged with John's decaying corpse. A post credit scene shows the neighbor from earlier with Angie's dog, whom she complained about multiple times, cradling it.

== Cast ==
- Joyena Sun as Wei
- Jess Hong as Angela / Wei
- Eden Hart as Eve / Wei
- Jared Turner as Paul
- Sepi To'a as Jasmin
- Xiao Hu as Aunt Ling
- Ginette McDonald as Sheryl
- Gideon T. Smith as Josh
- Mark Mitchinson as John
- Sam Wang as Liu

== Production ==
Grafted was produced by Murray Francis of Propaganda, and Leela Menon of FluroBlack. It was financed by the New Zealand Film Commission, amongst others.

The story was created Hweiling Ow, after being awarded the Women's Short Horror Film Fund in Melbourne in 2018. She said, "I thought long and hard about where I sat in the Venn diagram of me being a migrant living in New Zealand. I wondered what it would be like to live in someone else's life—to experience their privilege, their empowerment, their politics in a foreign country". Around the same time Sasha Rainbow had been working in Los Angeles on a script exploring similar themes and was sent Ow's script. She read it once and thought the it was "interesting, original, fresh, and exciting", and wrote back that she was interested. It was also written by Mia Maramara and Lee Murray. The film marks Rainbow's feature directorial debut.

The film was primarily shot in Auckland, New Zealand in mid-2023.

== Release ==
Grafted premiered at the New Zealand International Film Festival on 9 August 2024. The film was released in New Zealand on 12 September 2024, and in Australia on 21 November 2024, by (Yet) Another Monster Company.

In April 2023, Mister Smith Entertainment picked up sales in other territories. Shudder acquired North American, and UK and Ireland distribution rights. It began streaming on the platform on 24 January 2025.

== Critical reception ==
On the review aggregator website Rotten Tomatoes, 77% of 31 critics' reviews are positive, with an average rating of 6.4/10. Metacritic, which uses a weighted average, assigned the film a score of 62 out of 100, based on 6 critics, indicating "generally favorable" reviews.

Phil Hoad of The Guardian gave the film a score of three out of five, writing: "Grafted doesn't have the same sense of Freudian trauma. Its multicultural set of Face/Off-style masquerades could be some kind of commentary on what immigrants have to do to fit in—but then again maybe not". Katie Rife writing for RogerEbert.com scored the film a two and half out of five, comparing the film to The Substance (2024).
