= McMinn =

McMinn is a surname. Notable people with the surname include:

- Gilbert Rotherdale McMinn (1841–1924), Australian surveyor, brother of William (see below) and Joseph, both surveyors
- Joseph McMinn (1758–1824), governor of Tennessee from 1815 to 1821
- Ted McMinn (born 1962), Scottish former footballer
- Teri McMinn (born 1951), American actress
- William McMinn (1844–1884), Australian surveyor and architect, brother of Gilbert and Joseph, both surveyors
- Derek McMinn, British orthopaedic surgeon

== See also ==
- McMinn County High School
- McMinn Central High School
- McMinn County Airport
- McMinnville (disambiguation), several articles including

- McMinnville, Oregon
- McMinnville, Tennessee
