= Nicole Hoey =

New Zealand television producer

Nicole Hoey is a New Zealand television producer. She affiliates to Ngāti Kahu and Te Aupōuri iwi (tribes).

== Biography ==
Hoey founded her production company, Cinco Cine, in 1987 and initially specialised in commercials. After about 10 years, she began producing longer works such as teleplay Dead Certs, directed by Ian Mune, and documentary Dying For A Smoke. In 1997 Hoey created the Koina Te Kōrero campaign around Māori placenames for TV3, and from then on focused on producing Māori language programmes, such as Pūkana (a youth-oriented show), Kōrero Mai, Whānau, Tākaro Tribe (a language and culture programme for pre-schoolers) and quiz show Ihumanea.

Hoey has held several governance positions in the screen industry: board member and acting chair of New Zealand On Air, deputy chair of the New Zealand Screen Council, president and an executive member of SPADA (Screen Production and Development Association), treasurer of Nga Aho Whakaari and an executive member of WIFT - Women in Film and Television.

=== Awards and recognition ===
- 2020 WIFT New Zealand Mana Wāhine Award
- TV3/C4 Award for Success in New Zealand Television at 2005 Women in Film and Television New Zealand Awards
