= Caterina De Nave =

New Zealand producer, director, and media executive

Caterina De Nave ONZM
- Born: Caterina Maria De Nave; 23 February 1947; New Zealand
- Died: 17 August 2014 (aged 67); Sydney, New South Wales, Australia
- Occupations: Television and film producer and director
- Years active: 1970s–2010s
- Notable work: Shortland Street; Outrageous Fortune; Channelling Baby

Caterina Maria De Nave ONZM (23 February 1947 – 17 August 2014) was a New Zealand television and film producer, director, and media executive. She was the first woman to head a department at Television New Zealand (TVNZ) and one of the creators of New Zealand's longest-running soap, Shortland Street.

== Biography ==
De Nave was born on 23 February 1947, the daughter of Joseph and Dulcie De Nave, and grew up in Wellington; her father had emigrated to New Zealand from Stromboli, Italy, as a teenager. Her first role in the television industry was in Auckland in the early 1970s, as a script editor on the children's programme Play School. The show moved to Dunedin in 1975 and De Nave relocated there and began to produce and direct the programme.

In 1988, De Nave was appointed head of entertainment at TVNZ, becoming the first woman to head a department there. She then became head of development at South Pacific Pictures, TVNZ's production company. In this role, De Nave worked with Bettina Hollings to develop and produce Shortland Street. De Nave spent time in Australia, consulting soap experts at Grundy Television, in preparation for launching the show.

In 2000, De Nave moved to TV3 to take up the role of head of drama and comedy. There she produced Outrageous Fortune, bro'Town, The Jaquie Brown Diaries, and A Thousand Apologies.

As a director, De Nave directed episodes of Immigrant Nation, Shortland Street, Country GP, Close to Home, and The Topp Twins Election Coverage in 1996. She also chaired the International Comedy Festival from 1995 to 2000.

De Nave also worked on feature films. In the 1980s, she produced Trial Run with director Melanie Rodriga. In 1994, De Nave worked with director Christine Parker to produce a short film based on a short story by Keri Hulme: Hinekaro Goes on a Picnic and Blows Up Another Obelisk. Parker and De Nave also collaborated on Peach, featuring Lucy Lawless, before producing their first feature Channelling Baby (1999). The following year, De Nave was executive producer for the Michael Hurst-directed Jubilee.

In 2009, De Nave moved to Sydney, Australia, to a position at public broadcaster SBS, where she produced the drug-smuggling tale Better Man, and the comedy series Legally Brown.

== Honours and awards ==
In the 2006 Queen's Birthday Honours, De Nave was appointed an Officer of the New Zealand Order of Merit, for services to television and film. In 2009, she received the Great Southern Film & Television Award for Outstanding Contribution to the New Zealand Screen Industry at the Women in Film and Television New Zealand Awards.

In 2008, De Nave was named Industry Champion at the 2008 SPADA Screen Industry Awards (Screen Production and Development Association, New Zealand).

== Death ==
De Nave lived with leukemia for 15 years. She died of the disease at Royal North Shore Hospital, Sydney on 17 August 2014, aged 67. On her death, many prominent New Zealanders paid tribute to her, including former Prime Minister Helen Clark, who described De Nave as a "major force in [the] New Zealand screen industry for decades".
