= Aliesha Staples =

New Zealand businesswoman

- Born: New Zealand
- Occupation: businesswoman

Aliesha Staples is a businesswoman and digital technology entrepreneur from New Zealand. In 2022 she won the Imagezone Entrepreneurship Award at the Women in Film and Television New Zealand Awards.

== Biography ==
Staples grew up in Taradale and attended Napier Girls' High School. In 2007 she completed a diploma in screen production at the Eastern Institute of Technology (EIT) in Napier.

When she was 18 years old, Staples moved to Auckland and took a job working in the camera department of a media company. After a few years she moved overseas and worked on international cruise ships in South America, North America, Asia, Southeast Asia, the Caribbean, New Zealand and Australia creating promotional content with emerging film technology such as drones and gimbals.

In 2014 she returned to New Zealand and co-founded a rental company for high-tech gear for the film and game industries. The company later developed into Staples VR, specialising in augmented, virtual and mixed reality technology. Staples also founded vRemedies, a company supplying emerging tech solutions in the digital health field.

=== Awards and recognition ===
- Hi-Tech Young Achiever of the Year at 2017 New Zealand Hi-Tech Awards
- Excellence in Digital Health Award at 2018 New Zealand Excellence in IT Awards
- Supreme Women Leader at 2018 New Zealand International Business Awards
- Hi-Tech Young Achiever of the Year at 2018 New Zealand Hi-Tech Awards
- Silver Award for Specialised Cinematography at 2019 New Zealand Cinematographers Society Awards
- Imagezone Entrepreneurship Award at 2022 Women in Film and Television New Zealand Awards
