= Félix Raugel =

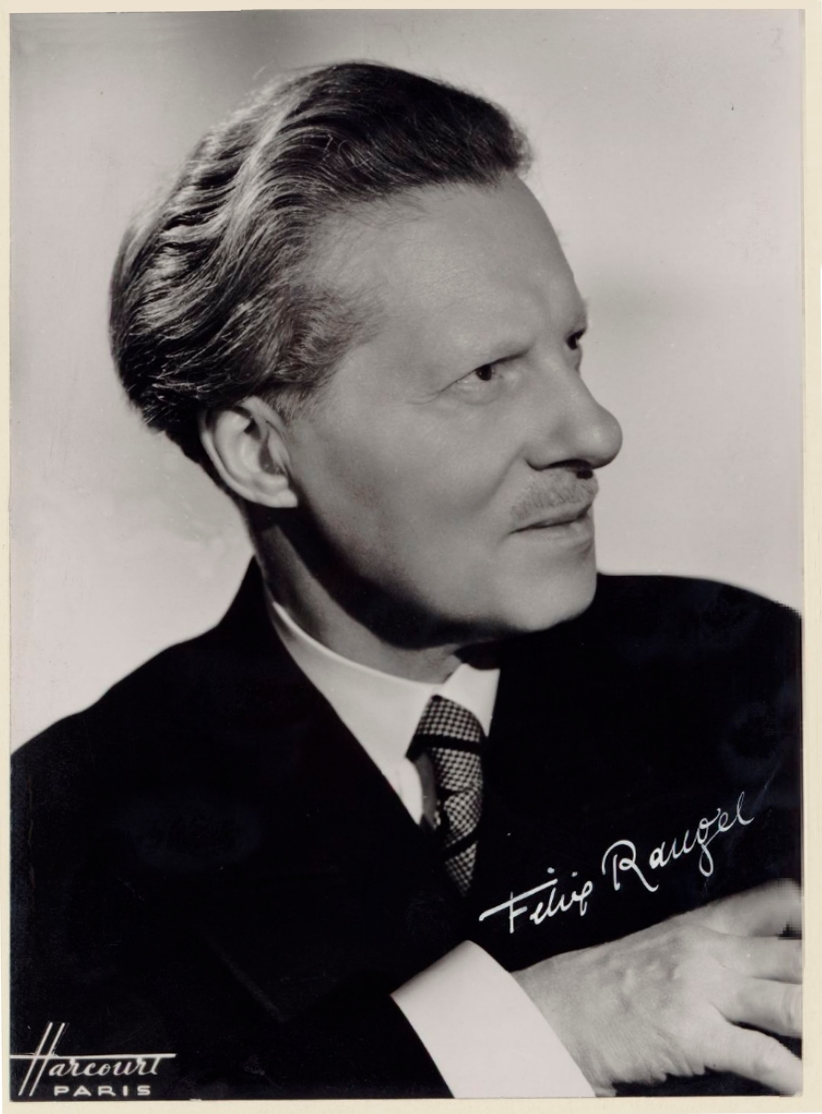
- Born: 27 November 1881; Saint-Quentin, France
- Died: 30 December 1975 (aged 94); Paris, France
- Education: Lille Conservatory
- Occupations: Musician; Conductor; Musicologist

Félix Alphonse Raugel (27 November 1881 – 30 December 1975) was a French musician, conductor, and musicologist.

After studying at the conservatory of Lille where he obtained the first prize for viola, he continued in Paris where he worked in harmony, pipe organ (with Abel Decaux), counterpoint (with Albert Roussel), and musical composition (with Vincent d'Indy).

He became conductor at the Haendel Society, Kapel meister at the Saint-Eustache church in Paris then director of the Philharmonic Orchestra of Reims for 50 years. He was also choirmaster at the Saint-Honoré-d'Eylau church, participated in the "Société des Études Mozartiennes", was appointed head of the Choirs of the French Broadcasting (ancestors of the Chœur de Radio France), vice president of the Société française de musicologie, and a member of the "Commission des monuments historiques".

Félix Raugel was also an historian of the organ and the author of several works about the instrument, and also Palestrina, L'oratorio, and Le chant choral.
