= Alan W. C. Menzies =

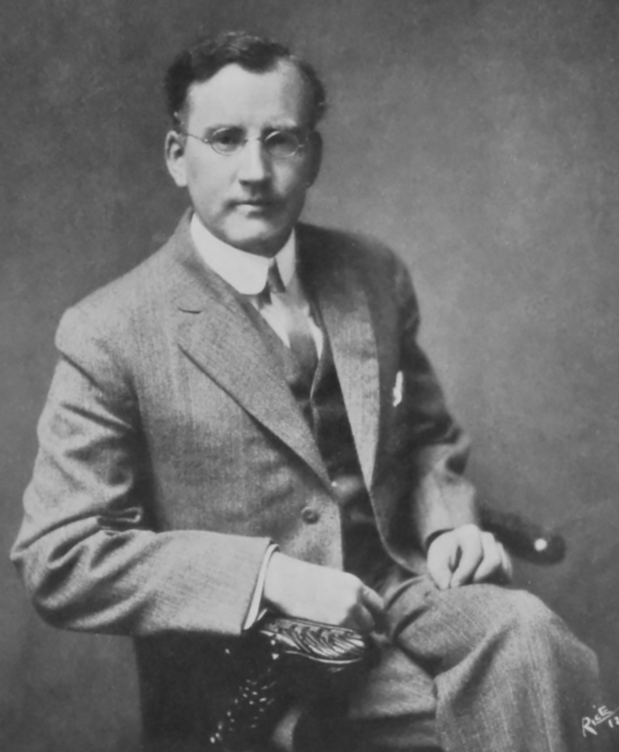
- Born: Alan Wilfrid Cranbrook Menzies; 31 July 1877; Edinburgh, Scotland
- Died: 8 September 1966 (aged 89); Hillsborough, New Jersey, US
- Education: Daniel Stewart's College; University of Edinburgh; University of Chicago
- Occupation: Chemist
- Spouse: Mary Isabella Dickson (m. 1908)
- Children: 1

Prof Alan Wilfrid Cranbrook Menzies FRSE (pronounced MING-iss; 31 July 1877 – 8 September 1966) was a Scottish-born chemist who later taught at Princeton University.

== Life ==
Menzies was born in Edinburgh on 31 July 1877, son of Thomas Hunter Menzies, master draper, and Helen Charlotte (née Cranbrook). His name on the birth certificate does not include Cranbrook. He was educated at Daniel Stewart's College and then studied science at the University of Edinburgh. graduating with MA and BSc in 1898.

In 1900 he was elected a Fellow of the Royal Society of Edinburgh. His proposers were Alexander Crum Brown, John Gibson, Sir Arthur Mitchell, and Sir John Batty Tuke.

In 1910 he emigrated to the United States to take up postgraduate studies at the University of Chicago where he gained a PhD. Following the retirement of Professor Frank Fanning Jewett in 1912, Menzies was appointed head of chemistry at Oberlin College. Two years later he was offered a professorship at Princeton University where he taught until he retired in 1945.

He married Mary Isabella Dickson on 20 March 1908 at All Saints Church, Edinburgh. They had one child, Elizabeth Grantcranbrook Menzies, born on 24 June 1915, in Princeton; she died there, unmarried, on 12 January 2003.

Menzies died in Foothill Acres Nursing Home in Hillsborough, New Jersey on 8 September 1966.

== Publications ==
Several of the publications cited here are with co-authors.

- Menzies, Alan W. C. (1921). "Tin Plague and Scott's Antarctic Expedition". Nature. 108 (2720): 496. Bibcode:1921Natur.108..496M. doi:10.1038/108496c0. S2CID 4082449.
- Menzies, Alan W. C.; Wright, Sydney L. (1921). "The Application of a Differential Thermometer in Ebullioscopy". Journal of the American Chemical Society. 43 (11): 2314–2323. doi:10.1021/ja01444a004. PMC 1084754. PMID 16576581.
- Menzies, Alan W. C. (October 1922). "Modern Study of the Atom". The Scientific Monthly. 15 (4). The Science Press: 364. Bibcode:1922SciMo..15..364M.
- "The Vapor Pressures of Sulphur between 100° and 550° with related Thermal Data". Journal of Physical Chemistry. American Chemical Society. 1 December 1929.
- "The Rate of Attainment of Vapor Pressure Equilibrium in Liquids". Journal of Physical Chemistry. American Chemical Society. 1 December 1929.
- Menzies, Alan W. C.; Sloat, C. A. (1929). "Spiral Markings on Carborundum Crystals". Nature. 123 (3097): 348–49. Bibcode:1929Natur.123..348M. doi:10.1038/123348b0. S2CID 32921626.
