= Bettina Hollings =

New Zealand television producer

Bettina Hollings is a New Zealand television producer and media executive.

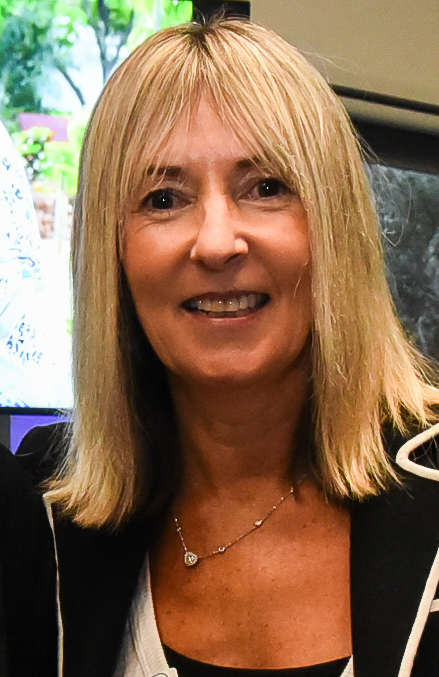
Bettina Hollings in July 2019

== Biography ==
Hollings was born and raised in Wellington and moved to Auckland to study advertising and communications at the Auckland Institute of Technology (now AUT). After graduating, she worked as a media planner at the advertising agency Colenso for three years. In 1987, she moved to TV2 as a programmer. She was one of the creators of the long-running and highly successful soap opera Shortland Street - in 1991 she advocated for a five-day-a-week local soap opera and convinced Ruth Harley at New Zealand on Air to fund it. South Pacific Pictures (owned by TVNZ) won the tender to deliver the show and Hollings suggested it be set in a hospital. Together with producer Caterina De Nave and writer Jason Daniel she created the key characters.

In 1995, Hollings moved to TV3 and developed factual reality shows such as Police Stop and Fresh-up in the Deep End.

In March 1997, Hollings became the first woman to head a major television network in New Zealand, when she became the head of Canwest’s new channel TV4. She helped shape up the creation of the channel, aimed at the "screenager" community of young adults. In September 1997, she visited the Teletubbies filming location when its sister channel TV3 was eyeing an acquisition of the series, which started airing there on 16 March 1998. In December 1997, she became director of programming at TV3, after the resignation of Gary Brown, making her the director of the two channels.

In 2004, she left the company and moved to New York to study at the New York Film Academy. On returning to New Zealand, she became more active in creating TV content via her production company Imagination TV, founded in 2001. The company has introduced many reality shows to New Zealand viewers, including as MasterChef New Zealand, New Zealand's Got Talent, Stars in their Eyes, My Kitchen Rules and Grand Designs.

She has also worked on the TV series RSPCA Animal Rescue and Wild Life at the Zoo.

=== Awards and recognition ===
- Queenstown Camera Company Entrepreneurship Award at 2016 Women in Film and Television New Zealand Awards
