= Marguerite Béclard d'Harcourt =

French composer (1884–1964)

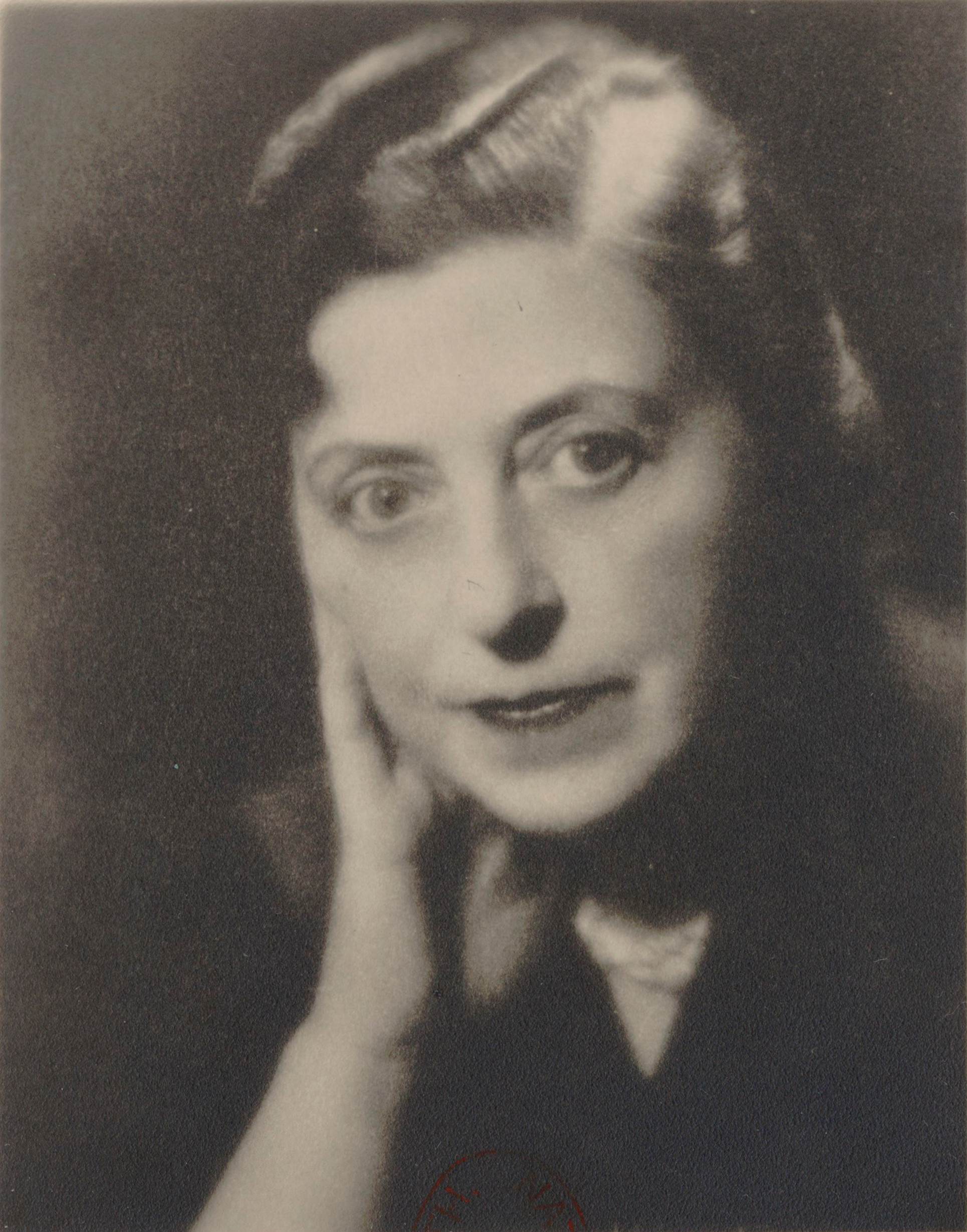

Marguerite Béclard d'Harcourt (24 February 1884 – 2 August 1964) was a French composer and ethno-musicologist. She was born in Paris and studied composition at the Schola Cantorum with Abel Decaux, Vincent d'Indy and Maurice Emmanuel.

She married ethnologist Raoul d'Harcourt and afterward researched South American and Canadian folk music, publishing texts in collaboration with him. She also collected and published folk melodies from Ecuador, Peru, Bolivia and other countries in standard European notation. She died in Paris.

== Life ==
Marguerite Béclard was born in Paris in 1884, the third child of Marie-Louise Simonard and Jules Béclard, dean of the Faculté de Médecine. She studied at the Schola Cantorum de Paris: the organ under Abel Decaux, composition under Vincent D’Indy, a co-founder of the school, and counterpoint under Maurice Emmanuel, who helped grow her interest in the music of Ancient Greece and in popular music.

In 1908 she married Raoul D'Harcourt, and subsequently followed him to Peru for business in 1912, and again in 1918. In 1925 they published an ethnomusicology book from their travels to Peru, titled La Musique des Incas et ses survivances. This research would partly influence D'Harcourt's musical inspirations. In 1923 she published arrangements of popular folk melodies from Ecuador, Peru, and Bolivia for solo voice, harp, piano, mandolin, guitar, and flute. She also published dances from the same region for solo flute, flute and harp, or flute and piano. In 1926 she composed Raïmi, a ballet with music for soloists, choir, and orchestra, inspired by Incan ceremonies. The work was not performed, however, until 1939, conducted by Eugéne Bigot. Much of this music's harmonic treatment is largely based on the pentatonic, or five tone, scale, which is the prevailing scale of Peruvian music.

Similar expeditions to Canada resulted in settings of French Canadian folk music, in particular that of Quebec. In 1956 the couple published a book on the French folk songs of Canada, and studied the French folk songs of Louisiana.

D'Harcourt submitted several of her works to the Société Nationale de Musique and to the Société Musicale Indépendante, and her surviving work consists of at least 40 melodies (some with scores and arrangements for instruments and orchestra), a dozen choir pieces, three piano pieces, a dozen chamber music pieces, four symphonies, the ballet Raïmi, and opera with her own libretto, Dierdane. The majority of these works, fifty or so of which were published, are housed in the French National Library.

She died in Paris in 1964 at the age of 80.

== Works ==
Selected works include:

- Fifty popular Indian Melodies, 1923
- Raimi, or the Feast of the sun, ballet, 1926
- La flûte de Jade, songs 1929
- 3 Sonnets from the Renaissance, 1930
- String Quartet, 1930
- Three symphonic movements, 1932
- Children in the pen, melodies, 1934–1935
- Twenty-four Folk Songs of Old Quebec, 1936
- Sonata Three, 1938
- Deux danses créoles, 1939
- Dierdane, lyric drama, 1937–1941
- Rapsodie péruvienne, 1945
- Sonatine for flute and piano, 1946
- The Seasons, 2nd symphony, 1951–1952

Writings with Raoul d'Harcourt include:

- Music of the Incas and its survivals, Paris, P. Geuthner, 1925
- French folk songs of Canada: their musical language, Paris, PUF, 1956
