= Jim Menzies =

Jim Menzies may refer to:

- Jim Menzies, fictional character in Another Country
- Jim Menzies, zoologist who worked with Liz Dennis

== See also ==
- James Menzies (disambiguation)
