= Women in Film and Television New Zealand Awards =

New Zealand awards list for women in film and tv

The Women in Film and Television New Zealand Awards, also known as the WIFT NZ Awards, are a set of awards that celebrate and encourage the achievements of New Zealand women in film, television and digital media. The awards are administered by Women in Film and Television New Zealand, the national chapter of Women in Film and Television International, and have been awarded since 2004.

The awards were initially made in four categories; additional categories have been added and as of 2022 the awards are made in 11 categories. The awards were also initially presented annually and are now presented biennially. No awards were made in 2012.

Nominations are invited from the public. A panel selects finalists in each category, who are invited to an awards ceremony in Auckland where the recipients are announced.

== Award ceremonies and recipients ==
=== 2022 ===
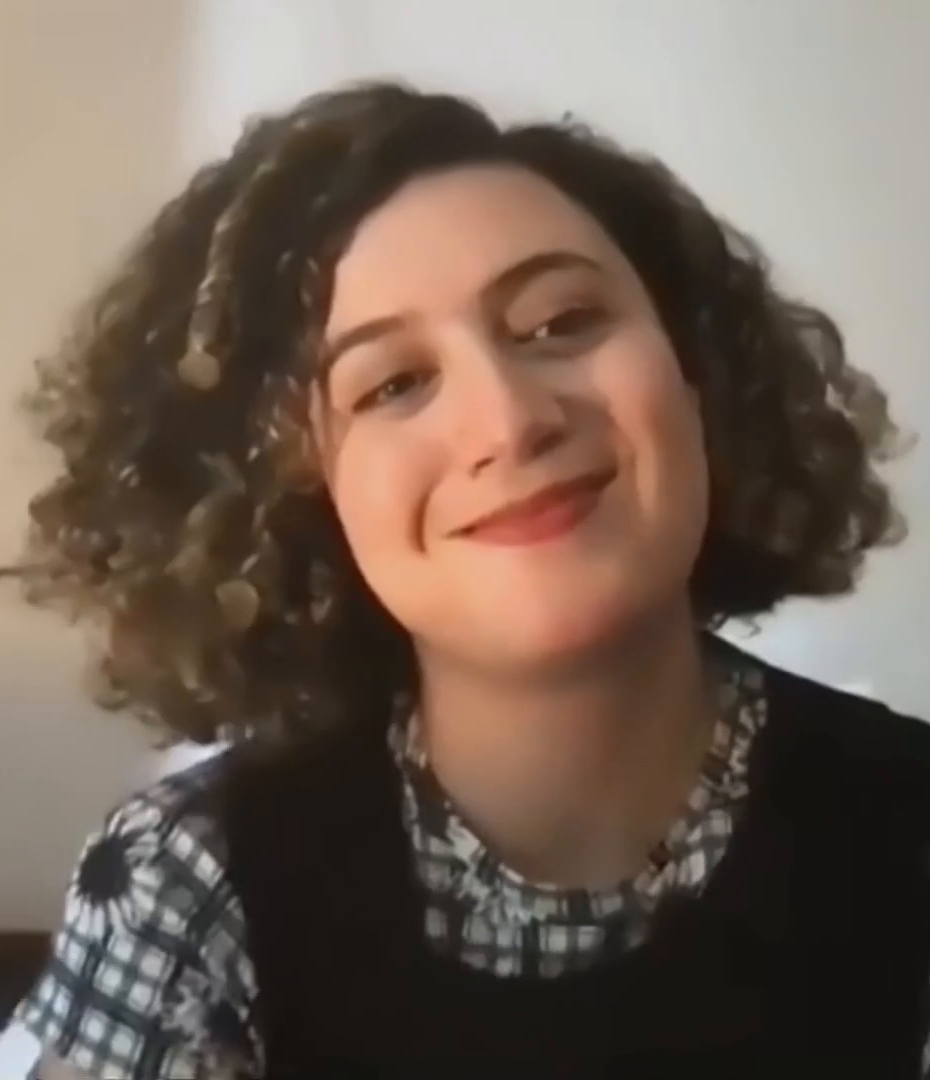
Rose Matafeo, winner of the 2022 Images & Sound Award for Success in Television and Digital

The awards ceremony was held on 8 July at ASB Waterfront Theatre, Auckland. One new category was awarded this year: the Tautai Award for Moana Excellence in the Screen Industry, celebrating the contribution of Moana Pasifika women working in the screen industry in Aotearoa New Zealand.

Award	Recipient	Notes
SAE Award for Outstanding Newcomer	Cian Elyse White (Te Arawa, Ngāti Pikiao)	
South Pacific Pictures Award for Achievement in Film	Chelsea Winstanley (Ngāti Ranginui, Ngāi te Rangi), for Jojo Rabbit	
Imagezone Entrepreneurship Award	Aliesha Staples, co-founder of Click Studios and Staples VR	
Images & Sound Award for Success in Television and Digital	Rose Matafeo, for Starstruck and Horndog	
Professional Lighting Services Award for Unsung Heroine of the New Zealand Screen Industry	Dianne Moffatt, script supervisor	
Fulcrum Media Finance Woman to Watch Award	Shoshana McCallum	
Te Māngai Pāho Te Reo Māori Champion Award	Reikura Kahi (Waikato, Ngāpuhi, Ngāti Porou, Whānau a Apanui and Cook Island)	
The Queenstown Camera Company Craft Award	Melissa Ririnui (Tauranga Moana)	
Wingnut and Wētā Companies Creative Technology Award	Alana Cotton, colourist	
Tautai Award for Moana Excellence in the Screen Industry	Sima Urale, director, writer and educator	
Great Southern Film & Television Award for Outstanding Contribution to the New Zealand Screen Industry	Shuchi Kothari, filmmaker, educator and mentor	

=== 2020 ===
The awards ceremony was held on 4 December 2020 at ASB Waterfront Theatre, Auckland, hosted by Antonia Prebble. One new category was awarded this year: the SAE Award for Outstanding Newcomer.

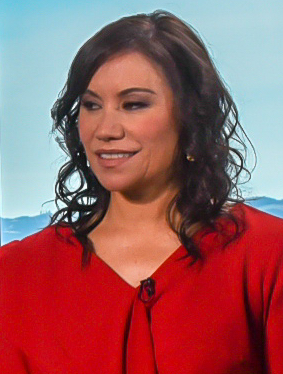
Stacey Morrison, winner of the 2020 Te Reo Māori Champion Award

Award	Recipient	Notes
SAE Award for Outstanding Newcomer	Kayleighsha Wharton, production and location manager	
South Pacific Pictures Award for Achievement in Film	Pietra Brettkelly	
Imagezone Entrepreneurship Award	Sharon Menzies, for her work in film financing	
Images & Sound Award for Success in Television and Digital	Annabelle Lee-Mather	
Professional Lighting Services Award for Unsung Heroine of the New Zealand Screen Industry	Louise Baker	
Fulcrum Media Finance Woman to Watch Award	Hweiling Ow, writer, director, and producer	
Te Puni Kōkiri Te Reo Māori Champion Award	Stacey Morrison, for her work promoting te reo Māori as a broadcaster, performer, teacher, and author	
The Queenstown Camera Company Craft Award	Bindy Crayford	
Weta Group Creative Technology Award	Amy Barber	
Great Southern Film & Television Award for Outstanding Contribution to the New Zealand Screen Industry	Kelly Martin	

=== 2018 ===
The awards ceremony was held on 1 March 2018 at ASB Waterfront Theatre, Auckland, hosted by Theresa Healey. Two new categories were awarded for the first time this year: The Queenstown Camera Company Craft Award and The Weta Group Creative Technology Award. The selection panel for the 2018 awards was Christina Milligan (chair), Robin Laing, Vicki Jackways, Cass Avery, Christina Asher, Jill Macnab and Alyx Duncan.

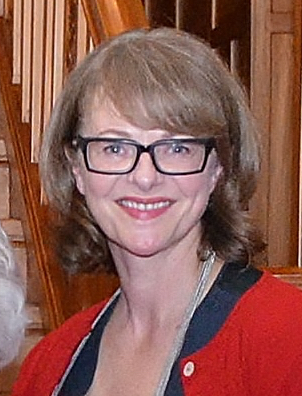
Miranda Harcourt, winner of the 2018 Award for Achievement in Film

Award	Recipient	Notes
South Pacific Pictures Award for Achievement in Film	Miranda Harcourt, for her work as acting coach on the film Lion	
Imagezone Entrepreneurship Award	Libby Hakaraia, for co-founding the Māoriland Film Festival	
Images & Sound Award for Success in Television and Digital	Maxine Fleming, producer of television series Shortland Street	
Professional Lighting Services Award for Unsung Heroine of the New Zealand Screen Industry	Nerida Cath, general manager of South Seas Film and Television School	
Fulcrum Media Finance Woman to Watch Award	Casey Zilbert, screenwriter	
Te Puni Kōkiri Te Reo Māori Champion Award	Wena Harawira (Ngāi Te Rangi, Ngāti Ranginui, Ngāi Tuhoe)	
The Queenstown Camera Company Craft Award	Kirsten Green	
Weta Group Creative Technology Award	Clare Burlinson, colourist	
Great Southern Film & Television Award for Outstanding Contribution to the New Zealand Screen Industry	Catherine Madigan, producer	

=== 2016 ===
The awards ceremony was held on 24 February 2016 at the Heritage Hotel, Auckland, hosted by Kate Rodgers.

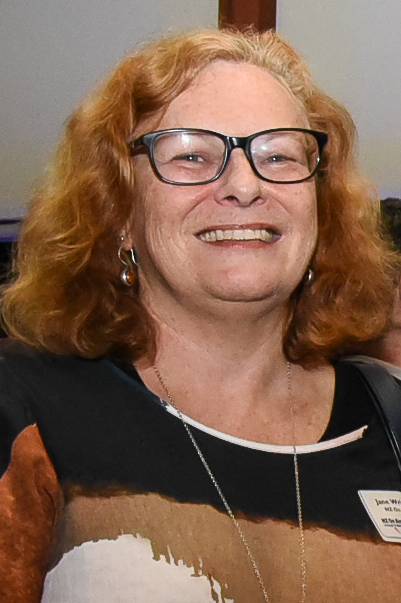
Jane Wrightson, winner of the 2016 Award for Outstanding Contribution to the New Zealand Screen Industry

Award	Recipient	Notes
South Pacific Pictures Award for Achievement in Film	Leanne Pooley, for Beyond the Edge	
Queenstown Camera Company Entrepreneurship Award	Bettina Hollings, for founding Imagination Television	
Images & Sound Award for Success in Television	Philly de Lacey	
Professional Lighting Services Award for Unsung Heroine of the New Zealand Screen Industry	Leonne Kassler, manager, The Film Equipment Company	
Fulcrum Media Finance Woman to Watch Award	Desray Armstrong, producer	
Te Puni Kōkiri Te Reo Māori Champion Award	Hinewehi Mohi	
Great Southern Film & Television Award for Outstanding Contribution to the New Zealand Screen Industry	Jane Wrightson, chief executive of New Zealand on Air	

=== 2014 ===
The awards ceremony was held on 26 February 2014 at the Heritage Hotel, Auckland. In addition to the seven award categories, an additional special award was made to Patsy Reddy, chair of the New Zealand Film Commission, for her leadership. The selection panel for the 2014 awards was Christina Milligan (chair), Penelope Borland, Sarah Cull, Debra Kelleher, Robin Laing, Fiona Milburn, Teremoana Rapley, and Sue Thompson.

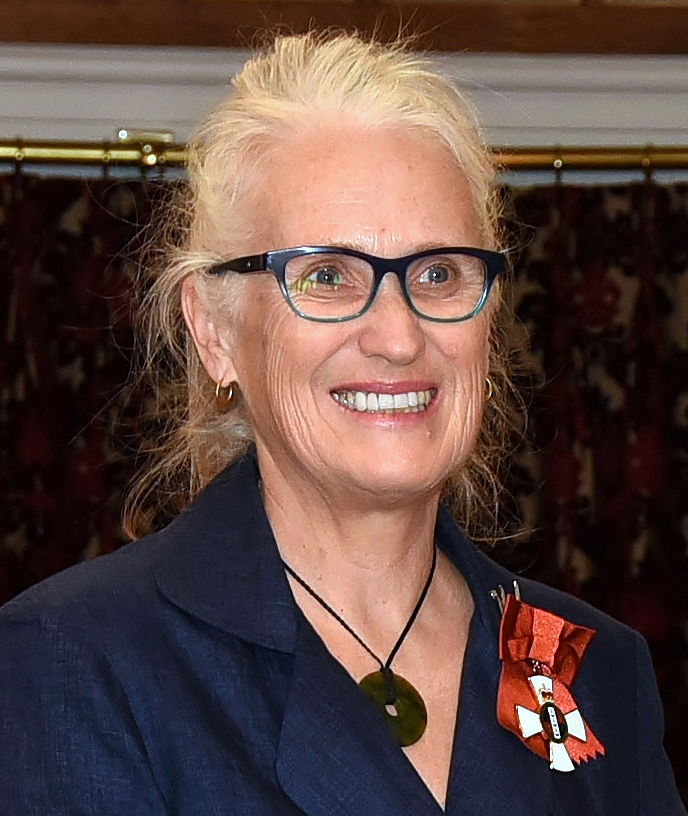
Jane Campion, winner of the 2014 Award for Success in Television

Award	Recipient	Notes
South Pacific Pictures Award for Achievement in Film	Catherine Fitzgerald, for The Orator	
Queenstown Camera Company Entrepreneurship Award	Frances Valintine, for the establishment and development of Mind Lab	
Images & Sound Award for Success in Television	Jane Campion, for Top of the Lake	
Professional Lighting Services Award for Unsung Heroine of the New Zealand Screen Industry	Lynne Reed, colour grader	
Fulcrum Media Finance Woman to Watch Award	Kerry Warkia	
Te Puni Kōkiri Te Reo Māori Champion Award	Hineani Melbourne	
Great Southern Film & Television Award for Outstanding Contribution to the New Zealand Screen Industry	Annie Collins, film editor	

=== 2010 ===
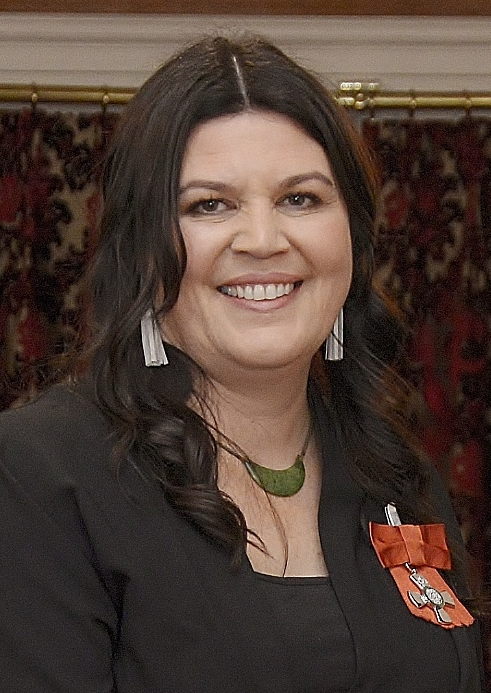
Ainsley Gardiner, winner of the 2010 Award for Achievement in Film and the 2004 Woman to Watch Award

In addition to the award categories, a special award was presented to Keri Kaa: Te Whaea Whakaata Taonga.

Award	Recipient	Notes
South Pacific Pictures Award for Achievement in Film	Ainsley Gardiner	
Queenstown Camera Company Entrepreneurship Award	Tania Rodger	
Images & Sound Award for Success in Television	Rachel Lang	
Professional Lighting Services Award for Unsung Heroine of the New Zealand Screen Industry	Adria Buckton	
Fulcrum Media Finance Woman to Watch Award	Julia Parnell, producer	
Te Puni Kōkiri Te Reo Māori Champion Award	Tini Molyneux	
Great Southern Film & Television Award for Outstanding Contribution to the New Zealand Screen Industry	Gaylene Preston	

=== 2009 ===
Award	Recipient	Notes
South Pacific Pictures Award for Achievement in Film	Arani Cuthbert	
Queenstown Camera Company Entrepreneurship Award	Janine Morell-Gunn (Ngāti Kahungunu)	
Images & Sound Award for Success in Television	Jacquie Brown	
Professional Lighting Services Award for Unsung Heroine of the New Zealand Screen Industry	Natalie Crane and Glenda Paterson	
Fulcrum Media Finance Woman to Watch Award	Chelsea Winstanley (Ngāti Ranginui, Ngāi te Rangi)	
Great Southern Film & Television Award for Outstanding Contribution to the New Zealand Screen Industry	Caterina De Nave	

=== 2008 ===
The awards ceremony was held on 11 August 2008 at Skycity Auckland.

Award	Recipient	Notes
South Pacific Pictures Award for Achievement in Film	Annie Goldson, documentary filmmaker	
Queenstown Camera Company Entrepreneurship Award	Rhonda Kite	
Images & Sound Award for Success in Television	Rachel Lang	
Professional Lighting Services Award for Unsung Heroine of the New Zealand Screen Industry	Carmen Leonard	
Fulcrum Media Finance Woman to Watch Award	Roseanne Liang	
Great Southern Film & Television Award for Outstanding Contribution to the New Zealand Screen Industry	Robin Laing	

=== 2007 ===
Award	Recipient	Notes
South Pacific Pictures Award for Achievement in Film	Ainsley Gardiner	
Images & Sound Award for Success in Television	Robyn Malcolm	
Professional Lighting Services Award for Unsung Heroine of the New Zealand Screen Industry	Sue May	
Fulcrum Media Finance Woman to Watch Award	Rachel Gardner	
Great Southern Film & Television Award for Outstanding Contribution to the New Zealand Screen Industry	Diana Rowan	

=== 2006 ===
Award	Recipient	Notes
South Pacific Pictures Award for Achievement in Film	Ngila Dickson, costume designer	
Images & Sound Award for Success in Television	Rachel Lang	
Professional Lighting Services Award for Unsung Heroine of the New Zealand Screen Industry	Mairi Gunn	
Fulcrum Media Finance Woman to Watch Award	Gemma Gracewood	
Great Southern Film & Television Award for Outstanding Contribution to the New Zealand Screen Industry	Chloe Smith	

=== 2005 ===
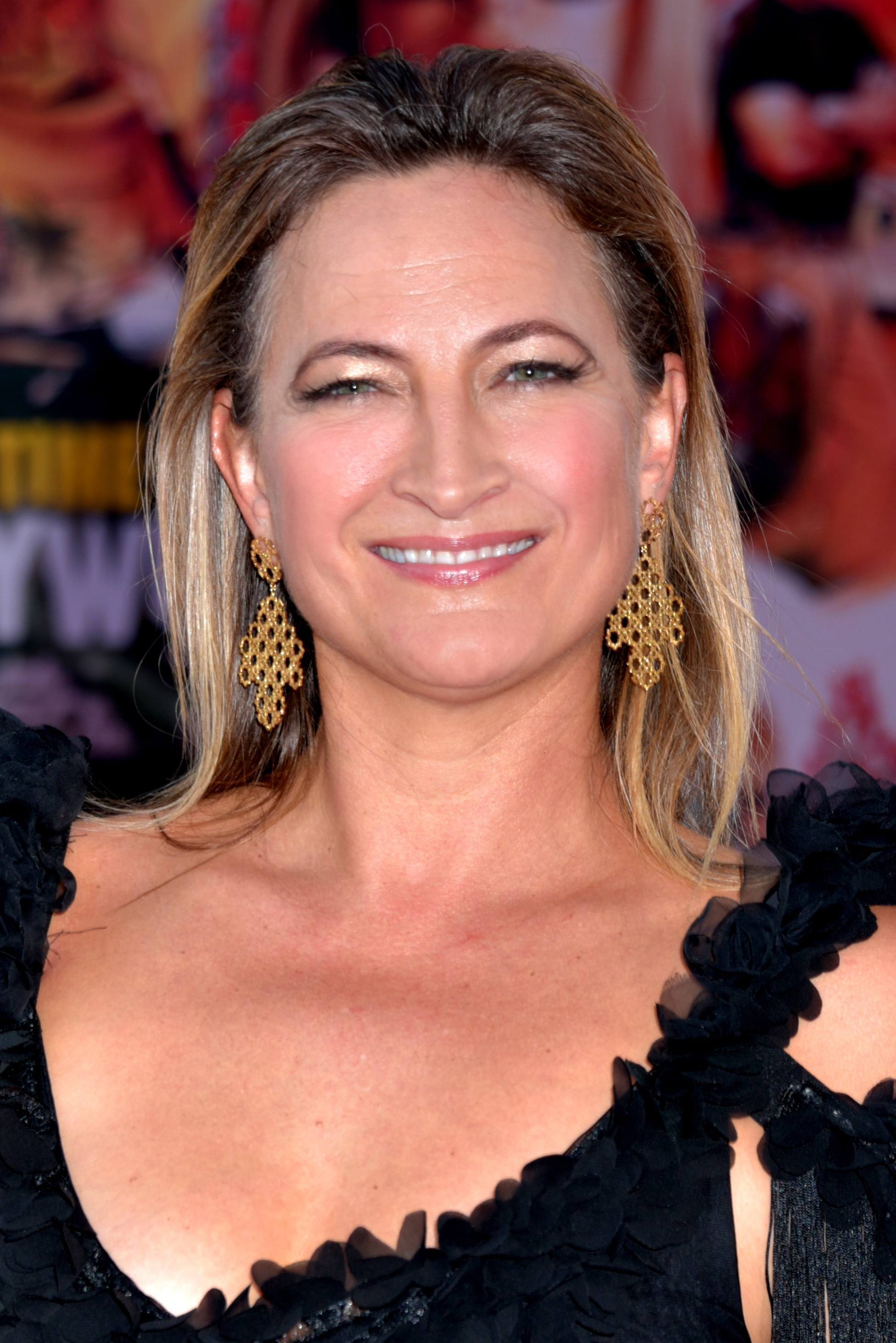
Zoë Bell, winner of the 2005 Award for Achievement in Film

The awards ceremony was held on 10 October 2005.

Award	Recipient	Notes
South Pacific Pictures Award for Achievement in Film	Zoë Bell, stuntwoman and actress	
TV3/C4 Award for Success in New Zealand Television	Nicole Hoey	
Professional Lighting Services Award for Unsung Heroine of the New Zealand Screen Industry	Annie Frear, grip	
Fulcrum Media Finance Woman to Watch Award	Jane Andrews and Melanie Rakena, producers at Jam TV	
Great Southern Film & Television Award for Outstanding Contribution to the New Zealand Screen Industry	Robin Scholes, producer	

=== 2004 ===
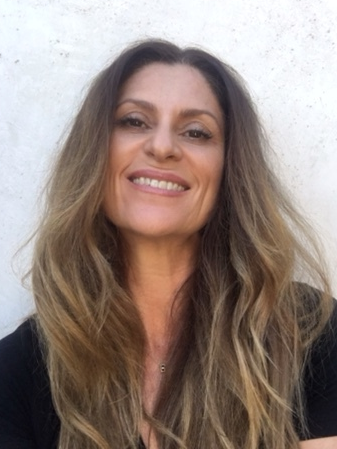
Niki Caro, winner of the 2004 Woman to Watch Award

Award	Recipient	Notes
South Pacific Pictures Award for Achievement in Film	Dame Fran Walsh, screenwriter and producer	
Images & Sound Award for Success in Television	Dame Julie Christie, producer	
Fulcrum Media Finance Woman to Watch Award	Niki Caro, Ainsley Gardiner and Leanne Saunders	
Great Southern Film & Television Award for Outstanding Contribution to the New Zealand Screen Industry	Ngila Dickson, costume designer	

== See also ==
- List of awards honoring women
