= Jean Bonfils (composer) =

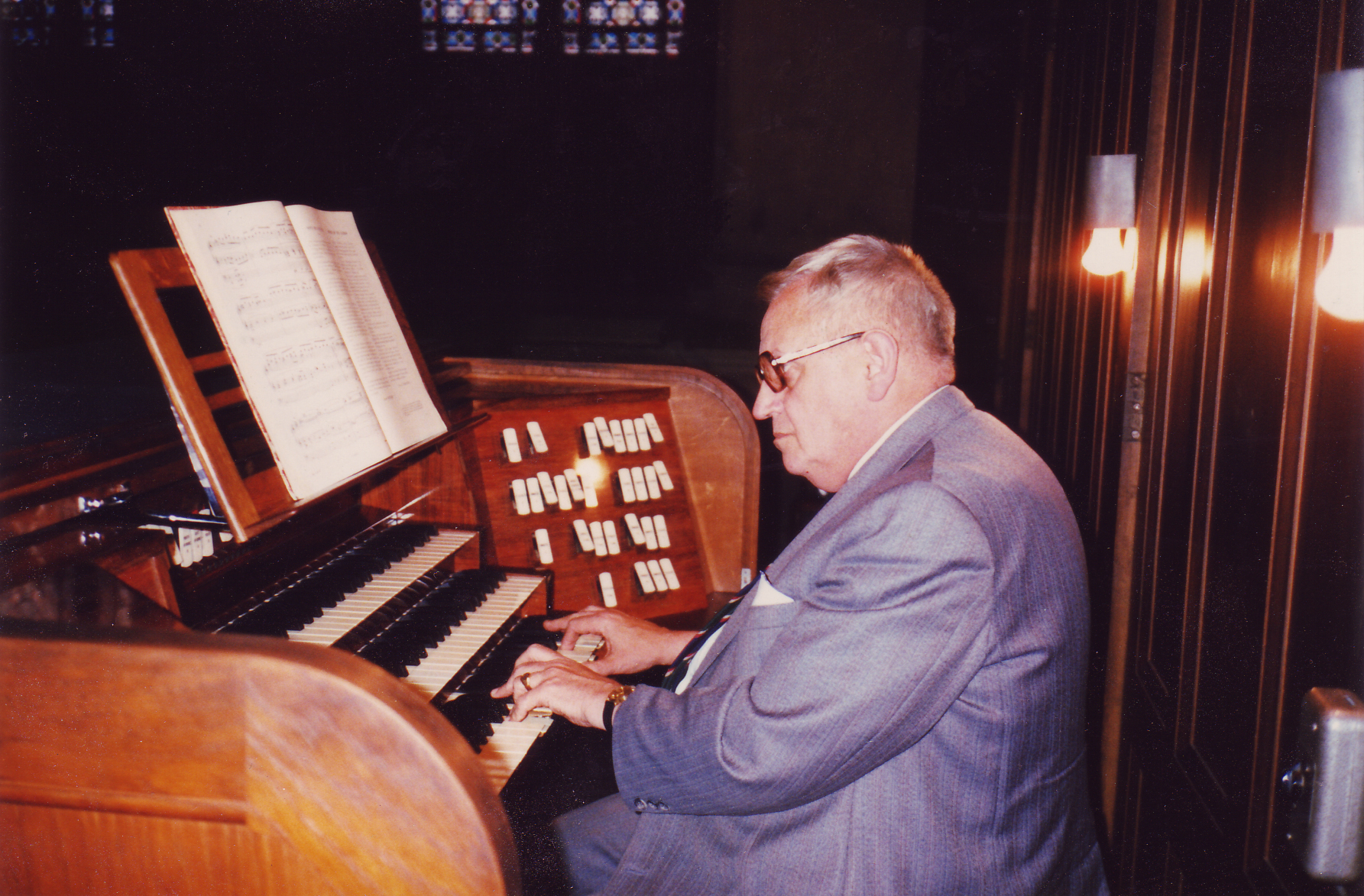
- Born: 21 April 1921; Saint-Étienne, France
- Died: 26 November 2007 (aged 86); Rennes
- Education: Conservatoire de Saint-Étienne; Conservatoire de Paris
- Occupations: Classical organist; Music educator

Jean-Baptiste Marcel Éloi Bonfils (21 April 1921 – 26 November 2007) was a 20th-century French organist, music educator, musicologist and composer.

== Biography ==
Born in Saint-Étienne (Loire), Bonfils commenced his musical studies at the conservatory of his hometown. After the war, he resumed his studies at the conservatoire de Paris where he obtained a First Prize in organ (1949) in the class of Marcel Dupré, a 2nd Prize in composition (1948) in the class of Jean Rivier and a 1st medal in musical analysis (1950) with Olivier Messiaen.

In the same year, he became Olivier Messiaen's assistant on the organ of the église de la Trinité à Paris, and this until 1992, then the assistant of Naji Hakim until 1999. Jean Bonfils was also the organist at the Grand Synagogue of Paris from 1953 to 1997.

Bonfils taught the organ at the Schola Cantorum de Paris from 1961 to 1973.

With Gaston Litaize, he directed the important series L'Organiste liturgique (1953-1967) at Éditions musicales of the Schola Cantorum and la Procure générale de Musique.

Bonfils died in Rennes (Ille-et-Vilaine department) on 26 November 2007 at the age of 86.

== Publications ==
- 1969–1970: The first two Livres d'orgue by Jacques Boyvin at Éditions Ouvrières
- 1963: The Second Livre d'orgue (1714) sur les Acclamations de la Paix tant désirée, including 18 noëls, by André Raison, at Éditions musicales de la Schola Cantorum et de la Procure Générale de musique
- 1964: The Livre d'orgue du Père Pingré : Anonymes français du XVIIIe siècle, Paris, musical editions of the Schola Cantorum
- 1968: Transcription of Chansons françaises pour orgue (c. 1550) at Éditions Heugel (Le Pupitre)
- 1969–1970: The first two Livres d'orgue by Jacques Boyvin at Éditions Ouvrières
- 1974: A Livre d'orgue attributed to Jean-Nicolas Geoffroy at Heugel
- 1981: with Marcel Bitsch and Jean-Paul Holstein, La Fugue, series "Que sais-je ?", issue 1849, P.U.F

In collaboration with Noëlie Pierront, Bonfils published:

- The series Deo gloria: répertoire liturgique de l'organiste pour orgue sans pédale ou harmonium in ten volumes.
- a Nouvelle méthode de clavier, orgue-positif, harmonium, in 4 issues (1960-1963)
- a Nouvelle méthode d'orgue, in 2 issues (1962).
