= Mesnil-Mauger =

- Commune
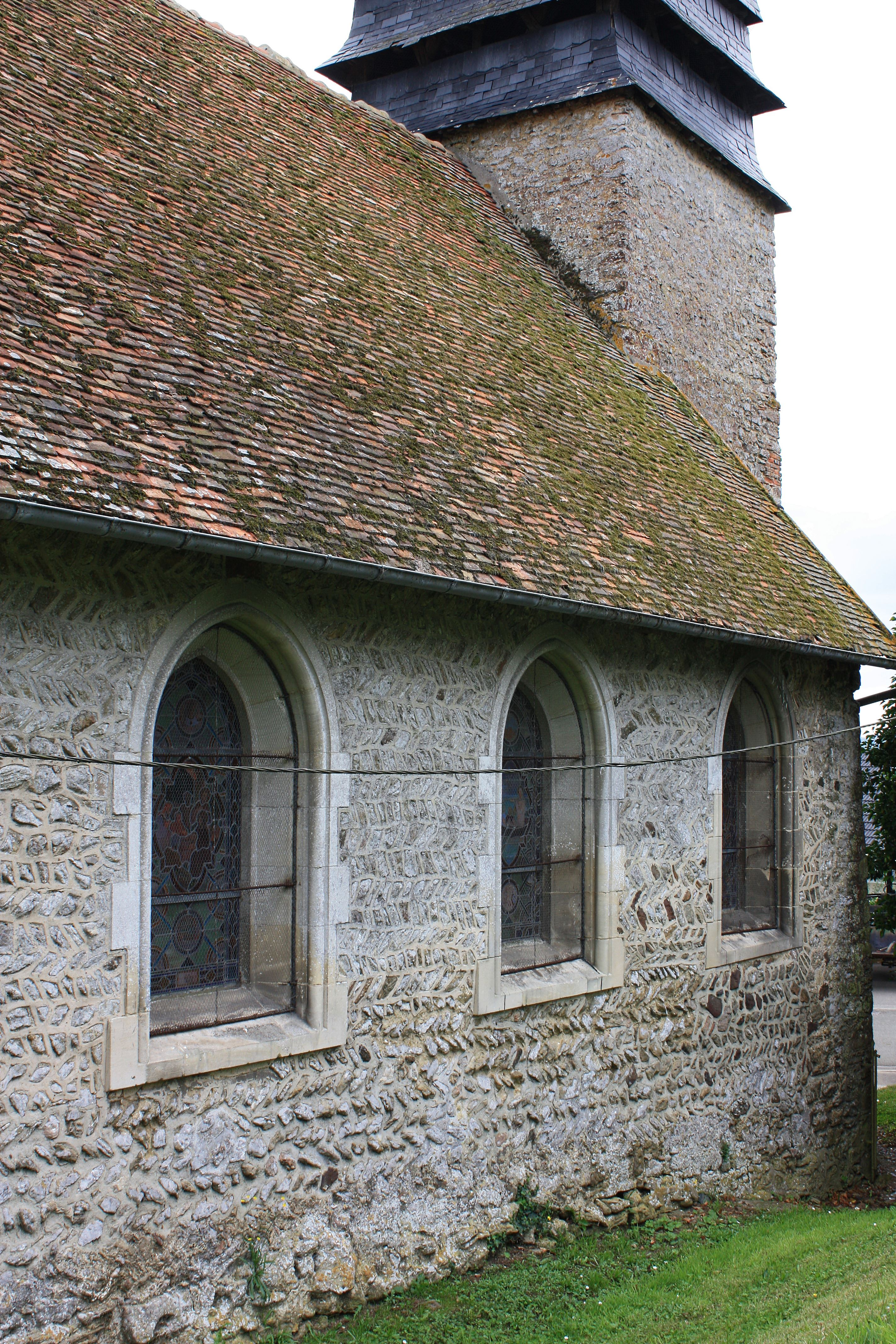
- The church in Mesnil-Mauger
- Location of Mesnil-Mauger
- Location within France Location within Normandy
- Coordinates: 49°40′23″N 1°31′07″E
- Country: France
- Region: Normandy
- Department: Seine-Maritime
- Arrondissement: Dieppe
- Canton: Gournay-en-Bray
- Intercommunality: CC 4 rivières

Government
  - Mayor (2026–32): Pascal Lefebvre
- Area^{1}: 8.28 km^{2} (3.20 sq mi)
- Elevation: 160 m (520 ft)
- Highest elevation: 202 m (663 ft)
- Lowest elevation: 101 m (331 ft)
- Population (2023): 243
  - Density: 29.3/km^{2} (76.0/sq mi)
- Time zone: UTC+01:00 (CET)
  - Summer (DST): UTC+02:00 (CEST)
- INSEE/Postal code: 76432 /76440
- ^{1} French Land Register data, which excludes lakes, ponds, glaciers > 1 km^{2} (0.386 sq mi or 247 acres) and river estuaries.

Mesnil-Mauger is a commune in the Seine-Maritime department in the Normandy region in northern France.

== Geography ==
A farming village situated by the banks of the river Béthune in the Pays de Bray, some 32 miles (51 km) southeast of Dieppe at the junction of the D120, the D102 and the D1314 roads.

== Population ==
Historical population
Year	Pop.	±% p.a.
1968	239	—
1975	213	−1.63%
1982	190	−1.62%
1990	207	+1.08%
1999	223	+0.83%
2007	236	+0.71%
2012	247	+0.92%
2017	247	+0.00%
2023	243	−0.27%
Source: INSEE

== Places of interest ==
- The church of St.Maur in the hamlet of Trefforest, dating from the eleventh century.
- The church of Notre-Dame, also dating from the eleventh century.

== See also ==
- Communes of the Seine-Maritime department
