= Sharon Menzies =

New Zealand financier

Sharon Menzies is a New Zealand financier specialising in film financing. In 2020 she received the Imagezone Entrepreneurship Award at the Women in Film and Television New Zealand Awards.

== Biography ==
Menzies' career in finance started in the banking industry working for a major Australian bank structuring mid-market corporate loans. She moved on to work in film finance in the United Kingdom, as head of business affairs for Baker Street Media Finance and later at Prescience Film Finance.

Menzies founded Fulcrum Media Finance in 2008 to specialise in cashflow lending in the Australian and New Zealand film and television production markets. In February 2023 she stepped down from the company.

Menzies has held industry positions such as co-president of Screen Production and Development Association of New Zealand (SPADA) since 2017, SPADA board member (Nov 2009 – Dec 2011), board member for Women in Film and Television (NZ) (2013) and later president (2014 to 2015) and as an assessor for Screen Australia’s Enterprise Programme (2015 and 2016). She is also chair of Film Bay of Plenty.
