= Catherine Madigan =

New Zealand film producer

Catherine Madigan is a New Zealand film producer.

== Biography ==
Madigan's career has included producing commercials, documentaries and films. Her documentaries have included biographies of Georgina Beyer, Helen Clark and Allen Curnow. In 2006 she produced a documentary on post-tsunami Sri Lanka, Turning the Tide.

In 2011 Madigan was appointed to the board of Film New Zealand.

=== Awards and recognition ===
- Great Southern Film & Television Award for Outstanding Contribution to the New Zealand Screen Industry at the 2018 Women in Film and Television New Zealand Awards
- Best Documentary (shared with Gaylene Preston) for My Year with Helen at the 2019 New Zealand Television Awards
