= John Menzies (disambiguation) =

John Menzies plc is a former name of Menzies Aviation, a Scottish distribution and aviation business, and former retailer.

John Menzies is also the name of:

- John A. Menzies (fl. 1996–2017), judge of the Court of Queen's Bench of Manitoba, Canada
- John Henry Menzies (1839–1919), New Zealand woodcarver and artist
- John K. Menzies (1948–2022), American diplomat and academic, United States Ambassador to Bosnian and Herzegovina
- John W. Menzies (1819–1897), politician, lawyer and judge from Kentucky
- John Menzies (painter) (1871–1939), Scottish painter
- John Menzies, a bookseller, in 1833 founder of what would later become Menzies Aviation
