= Hweiling Ow =

New Zealand film and television producer

- Born: Malaysia
- Occupations: Actor; director; film; television; producer

Hweiling Ow is a New Zealand film and television producer, director and actor. In 2020 she won the Woman to Watch Award at the Women in Film and Television New Zealand Awards.

== Biography ==
Hweiling Ow was born in Malaysia and moved to New Zealand when she was young. She has appeared on the New Zealand television soap opera Shortland Street and Mean Mums. She has been a producer and director on AFK — a web series set inside an online roleplaying game — and Ao-Terror-Oa.
