= Noëlie Pierront =

French organist, concertist and music educator

Noëlie Marie-Antoinette Pierront (23 September 1899 – 25 September 1988) was a 20th-century French organist, concertist and music educator.

== Biography ==
Born in the 6th arrondissement of Paris, Pierront started to study the pipe organ with Abel Decaux, Louis Vierne and Vincent d'Indy at the Schola Cantorum de Paris.

Subsequently, a student of Eugène Gigout and Marcel Dupré at the Conservatoire de Paris, where Olivier Messiaen, Jehan Alain, André Fleury, Maurice Duruflé, Jean Langlais and Gaston Litaize among others were her colleagues, she won its First Prize in organ in 1928.

She also worked the organ privately with André Marchal and musical composition with Guy de Lioncourt at the Schola Cantorum de Paris.

She was the organist at the Saint-Germain-des-Prés church from 1926 to 1928, then titular organist at the Église Saint-Pierre-du-Gros-Caillou in Paris from 1929 to 1970.

Pierront taught at the Schola Cantorum de Paris from 1925 to 1932.

As a concertist, she gave the last recital before the War on the Willis organ at the Alexandra Palace (London) on 20 August 1939.

She inaugurated the grand organ by Gonzalez-Danion of the cathédrale Saint-Étienne de Limoges on 13 December 1963.

Pierront died in the 15th arrondissement of Paris.

== Dedications ==
Charles Tournemire dedicated to her his number 49 of Dominica XXI post Pentecosten (29th Sunday after Pentecost) of his Orgue Mystique Op. 57.

Jehan Alain dedicated his Aria for organ (1938) to her.

== Publications ==
With Jean Bonfils, she is the author of:

- The series Deo gloria: répertoire liturgique de l'organiste pour orgue sans pédale ou harmonium.

N. Pierront et J. Bonfils in 10 volumes (1962–1968)

- Nouvelle Méthode d'orgue in 2 vol., Schola Cantorum (1962).
- Nouvelle Méthode de clavier in 4 vol., Schola Cantorum (1960–68).

She is also credited with numerous transcriptions and editions of organ music recordings at the Éditions musicales of the Schola Cantorum and the Procure générale de Musique, series Orgue et Liturgie, including an edition of the Livre d'orgue by De Grigny (Les Grandes heures de l'orgue) with Norbert Dufourcq in 1953.

Noëlie Pierront died in Paris on 25 September 1988.

== Sources ==
In L'Orgue n° 225 (1993/I), Symétrie (Lyon):

- Raphaël Tambyeff, Noëlie Pierront (1899–1988)
- Pierre Denis, Les organistes français d'aujourd'hui : Noëlie Pierront
- Discographie de Noëlie Pierront
- Principales publications musicales de Noëlie Pierront
- Composition de l'Orgue de Saint-Pierre-du-Gros-Caillou.
