= Mingus =

Mingus may refer to:

- Charles Mingus (1922–1979), jazz composer and double bass player
  - Sue Mingus, wife of the jazz composer
  - Mingus (Charles Mingus album), 1961 album by Charles Mingus
  - Mingus (Joni Mitchell album), 1979 jazz album by Joni Mitchell with Charles Mingus
  - Mingus Mingus Mingus Mingus Mingus, 1963 album by Charles Mingus
- Mingus, Texas, a city
- Mingus Mountain, in the Black Hills of Arizona
- Mingus Lookout Complex, a fire tower lookout complex in Prescott National Forest, Arizona
- Max Mingus, a character in a series of books by British thriller writer Nick Stone
- Mingus (supernova), a distant supernova
