= Gina Menzies =

Irish broadcaster and theologian

Gina Menzies is a frequent guest on Raidió Teilifís Éireann, the Irish national radio and television broadcaster and is described as a theologian.

Her academic qualifications include an H. Dip in Education from Trinity College Dublin, a Bachelor of Divinity from Milltown Institute of Theology and Philosophy and an MSc in Medical Ethics and Law. Menzies is a lecturer in Bioethics at the Royal College of Surgeons in Dublin.

She also contributes to print media outlets such as The Sunday Business Post and The Irish Times

She gave a testimony to the Oireachtas Joint Committee On Arts, Sport, Tourism, Community, Rural and Gaeltacht Affairs entitled The Role of Women in Sport, Wednesday, 12 November 2003 and was described by Jimmy Deenihan TD as "a great international squash player". She had served as chairperson of the Irish Government Taskforce on Women in Sport.

Gina and her husband Donald have two children and five grandchildren.
