= Mesnières-en-Bray =

- Commune
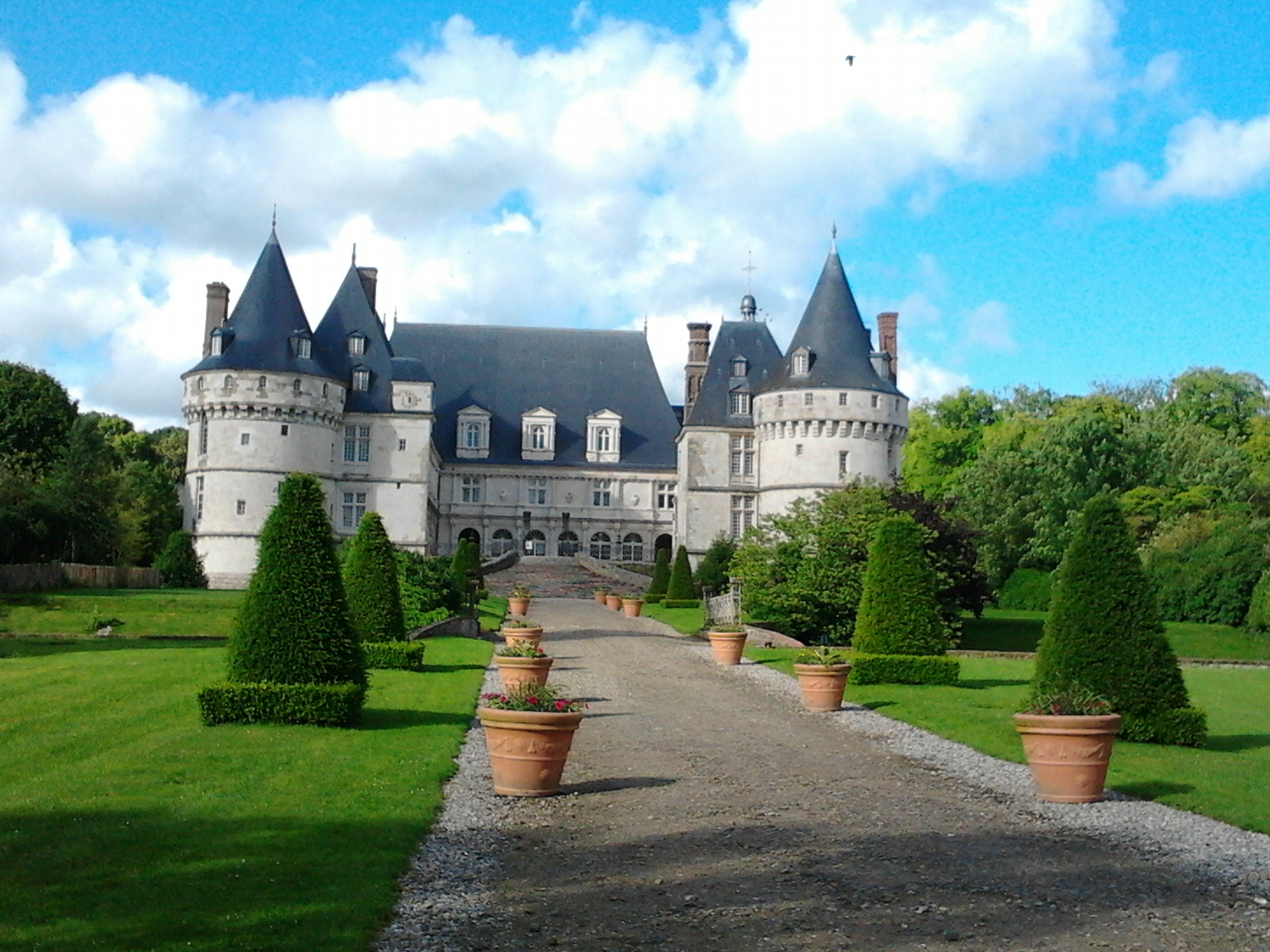
- The chateau in Mesnières-en-Bray

- Coat of arms
- Location of Mesnières-en-Bray
- Location within France Location within Normandy
- Coordinates: 49°45′51″N 1°22′59″E
- Country: France
- Region: Normandy
- Department: Seine-Maritime
- Arrondissement: Dieppe
- Canton: Neufchâtel-en-Bray
- Intercommunality: CC Bray-Eawy

Government
  - Mayor (2026–32): Dany Minel
- Area^{1}: 15.06 km^{2} (5.81 sq mi)
- Elevation: 65 m (213 ft)
- Highest elevation: 223 m (732 ft)
- Lowest elevation: 53 m (174 ft)
- Population (2023): 940
  - Density: 62/km^{2} (160/sq mi)
- Time zone: UTC+01:00 (CET)
  - Summer (DST): UTC+02:00 (CEST)
- INSEE/Postal code: 76427 /76270
- ^{1} French Land Register data, which excludes lakes, ponds, glaciers > 1 km^{2} (0.386 sq mi or 247 acres) and river estuaries.

Mesnières-en-Bray (French pronunciation: [mɛnjɛʁ ɑ̃ bʁɛ], literally Mesnières in Bray) is a commune in the Seine-Maritime department in the Normandy region in northern France. The town is the origin of the Scottish name Menzies.

== Geography ==
A forestry and farming village situated by the banks of the river Béthune in the Pays de Bray, some 18 miles (29 km) southeast of Dieppe at the junction of the D1 and the D97 roads.

The commune along with another 32 communes is part of a 3,503 hectare, Natura 2000 conservation area, called the Haute vallée de la Sarthe.

== Heraldry ==
Arms of Mesnières-en-Bray	The arms of Mesnières-en-Bray are blazoned : Chequy argent and sable of 5 traits.

== Population ==
Historical population
Year	Pop.	±% p.a.
1968	632	—
1975	629	−0.07%
1982	561	−1.62%
1990	609	+1.03%
1999	706	+1.66%
2007	884	+2.85%
2012	1,021	+2.92%
2017	927	−1.91%
2023	940	+0.23%
Source: INSEE

== Places of interest ==
- The chateau, built by Louis de Boissay in the 15th century. It was badly damaged in a fire in 2004.

The chateau has since been rebuilt and can be visited and rented for an event. the chateau site is home to a secondary and a high school offering courses in forestry, horticulture, the environment, personal services and hotel and catering.

- The church of Saint-Pierre & Saint-Paul, dating from the eleventh century.
- The old railway line, now a popular ramblers path.

== See also ==
- Communes of the Seine-Maritime department
