= James Menzies =

James Menzies may refer to:

- James Menzies (New Zealand politician) (1821–1888), New Zealand colonial administrator
- James Menzies (Australian politician) (1862–1945), member of the Victorian Legislative Assembly
- James Menzies (Wisconsin politician) (1830–1913), member of the Wisconsin State Assembly
- James Mellon Menzies (1885–1957), Canadian missionary
- James Menzies, gold digger in the 1860s after whom Menzies Creek in Victoria, Australia is named

== See also ==
- Jim Menzies (disambiguation)
