= McMinnville School District =

Public schools in Oregon, United States

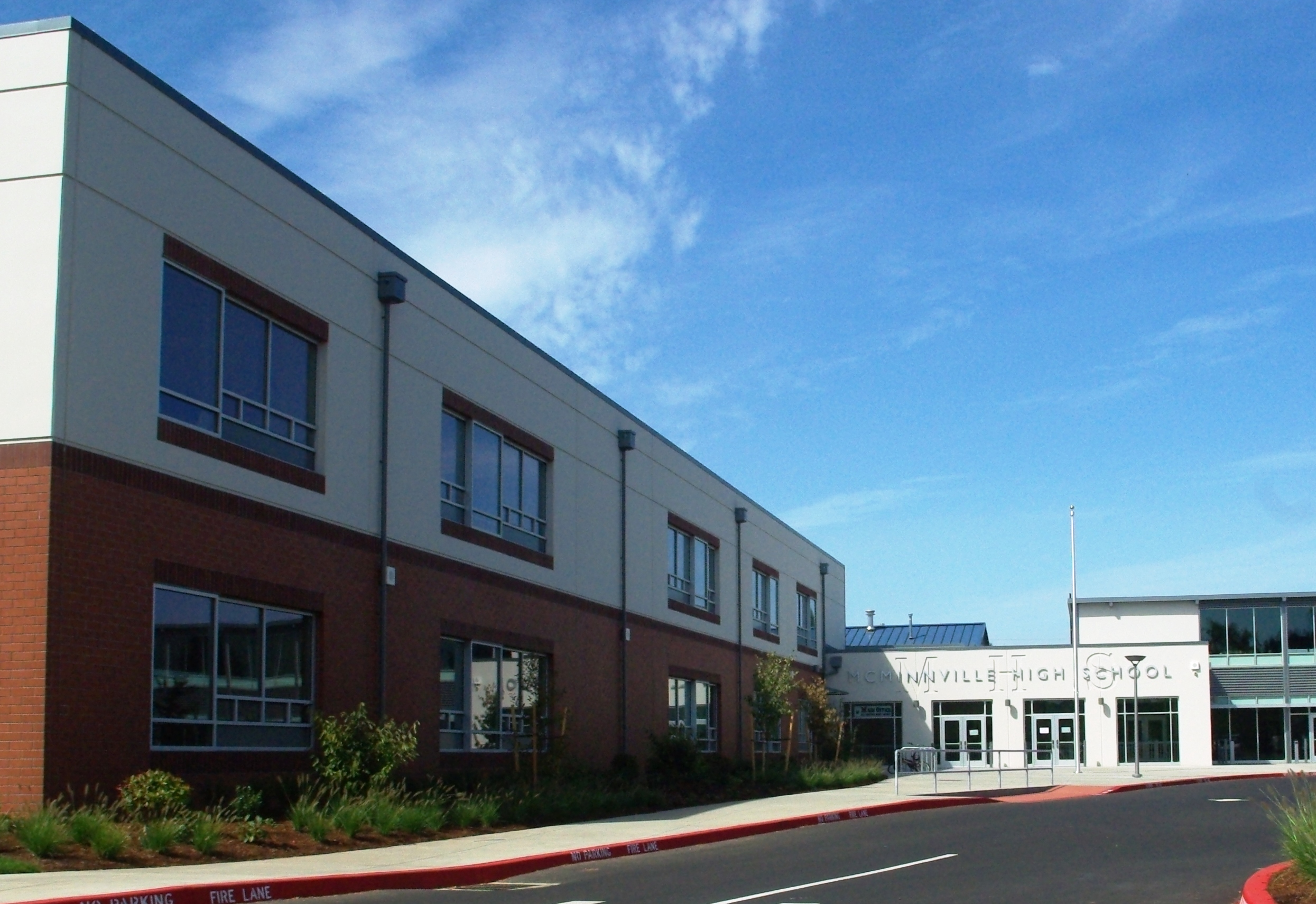
- McMinnville High School

Address
- 800 Northeast Lafayette Avenue McMinnville, Oregon, 97128; United States

District information
- Type: Public
- Grades: PreK–12
- NCES District ID: 4108010

Students and staff
- Students: 6,351 (2020–2021)
- Teachers: 355.76 (on an FTE basis)
- Staff: 409.98 (on an FTE basis)
- Student–teacher ratio: 17.85:1

Other information
- Website: www.msd.k12.or.us

McMinnville School District, also known as McMinnville SD 40, is a public school district in Yamhill County, Oregon, United States. It provides primary and secondary education for the cities of McMinnville and Lafayette.

As of October, 2014, it includes nine schools, with 709 employees and 6,638 students in six elementary schools, two middle schools, and one high school. On average, teachers have 13.5 years of experience, with 80% holding master's degrees.

== Demographics ==
2013-14 Total Enrollment: 6,638 (October 2014)

Elementary schools (K-5): 3,021 Middle schools (6-8): 1,545 High school (9-12): 2,072 Schools: 9

McMinnville High School (MHS) is a comprehensive high school that serves students in grades 9–12. MHS includes two satellite campuses: Cook Alternative School and the Engineering and Aerospace Sciences Academy (EASA).

Special Education students: 12.6% English Language Learners: 14.2% Student Demographics (2013-14 data)

African American: 1% American Indian/Alaska Native: 1% Asian/Pacific Islander: 1.9% Hispanic/Latino: 33.1% White: 62.6%

Parents may identify with more than one demographic category, producing totals greater than 100%.

== Schools ==
=== Elementary schools ===
- Grandhaven Elementary
- Memorial Elementary
- Newby Elementary
- Sue Buel Elementary
- Wascher Elementary
- Willamette Elementary

=== Middle schools ===
- Duniway Middle School
- Patton Middle School

=== High schools ===
- McMinnville High School
- Engineering Aerospace Sciences Academy
