= McMinnville High School =

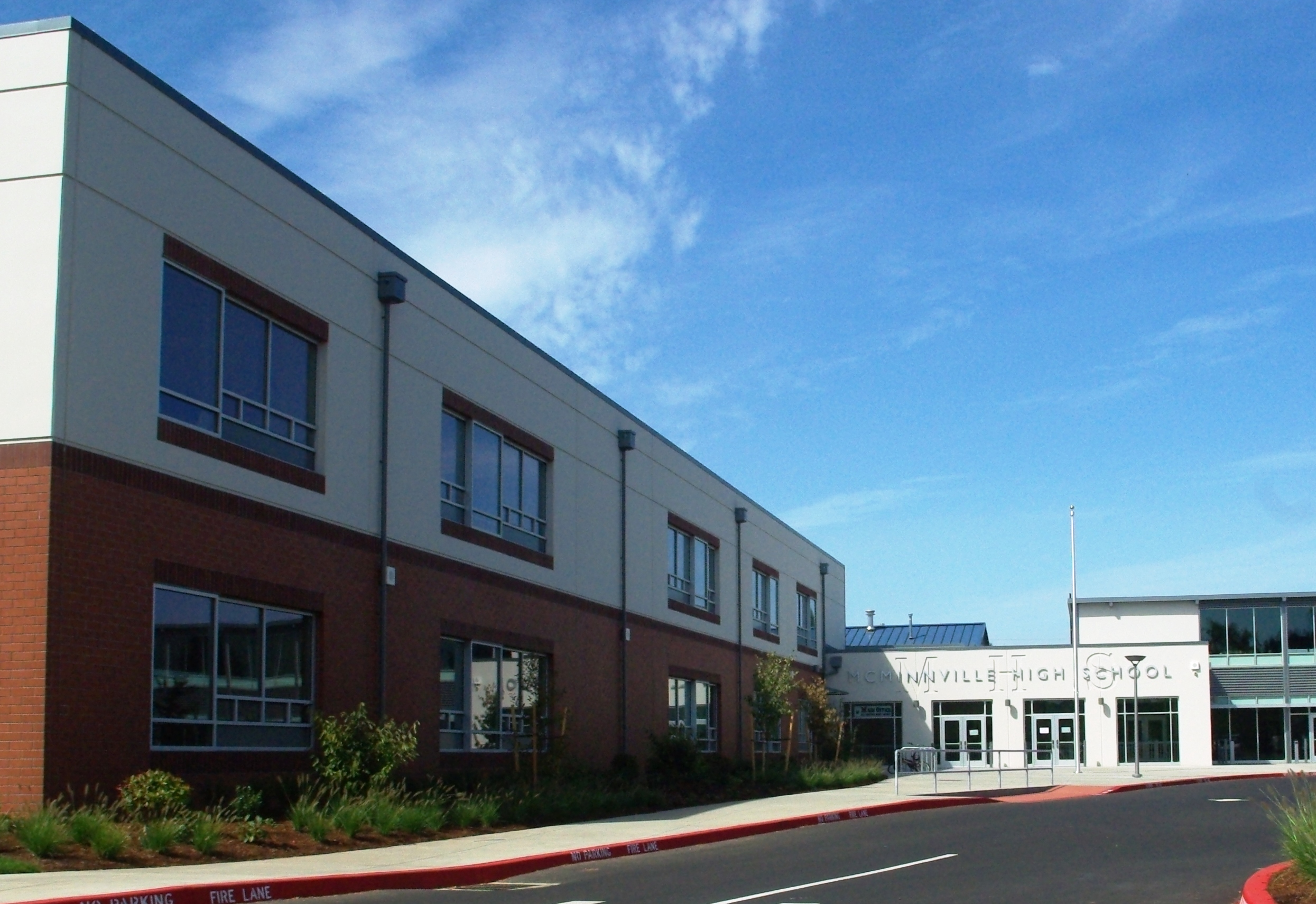
- Front entrance

Location
- 615 NE 15th Street; McMinnville, Yamhill County, Oregon 97128; United States; 45.219362°N 123.192508°W

Information
- Type: Public
- Opened: 1910
- School district: McMinnville School District
- Principal: Dave Furman
- Teaching staff: 104.98 (FTE)
- Grades: 9–12
- Enrollment: 2,319 (2024-25)
- Student to teacher ratio: 20.61
- Colors: Red, black, and white
- Athletics conference: OSAA Pacific Conference 6A-3
- Mascot: Grizzlies
- Team name: Grizzlies
- Rival: Newberg High School
- Newspaper: The Bruin
- Feeder schools: Duniway Middle School; Patton Middle School
- Website: mhs.msd.k12.or.us

McMinnville High School (colloquially Mac High or MHS) is a public high school located in McMinnville, Oregon. The school is the fourth largest comprehensive school (and fifth overall) in the state.

== History ==
Prior to 1876, high school students in the McMinnville area attended school at McMinnville College. From 1876 to 1910, McMinnville offered a two-year high school education through the Cook School (a single schoolhouse incorporating all grades). High school students took courses on the top floor of the building. The current four-year high school program was adopted in fall 1910 with the opening of McMinnville High School. It is to this school that MHS traces its lineage.

The oldest wing of the current high school opened in 1956, and has since been remodeled eleven times to accommodate the growing student population of McMinnville. The latest renovation was completed Fall 2019.

== Academics ==
In 2008, 75% of the school's seniors received their high school diploma. Of 459 students, 343 graduated, 60 dropped out, 3 received a modified diploma, and 53 are still in high school.

=== Engineering and Aerospace Sciences Academy (EASA) ===
Engineering and Aerospace Sciences Academy (EASA) is a specialized program at McMinnville High School that offers students specialized courses in engineering and aerospace science. Students are instructed by engineers and technicians who lecture, serve as resources for student research, and work with students on a variety of real and simulated technical problems and projects.

== Athletics ==
=== State championships ===
- Boys' soccer: 2006
- Boys basketball: 1979 (led by future NBA player Charlie Sitton)
- Girls' tennis: 1955, 1956, 1957

== Notable alumni ==
- Verne Duncan, American politician
- Bill Krueger, former Major League Baseball pitcher
- Ehren McGhehey, daredevil, actor, Jackass star
- Grant Robison, Olympic track athlete
- Joe Paterson, former Major League Baseball pitcher
- Raemer Schreiber, American physicist
- Charlie Sitton, American retired basketball player
