= List of compositions for organ =

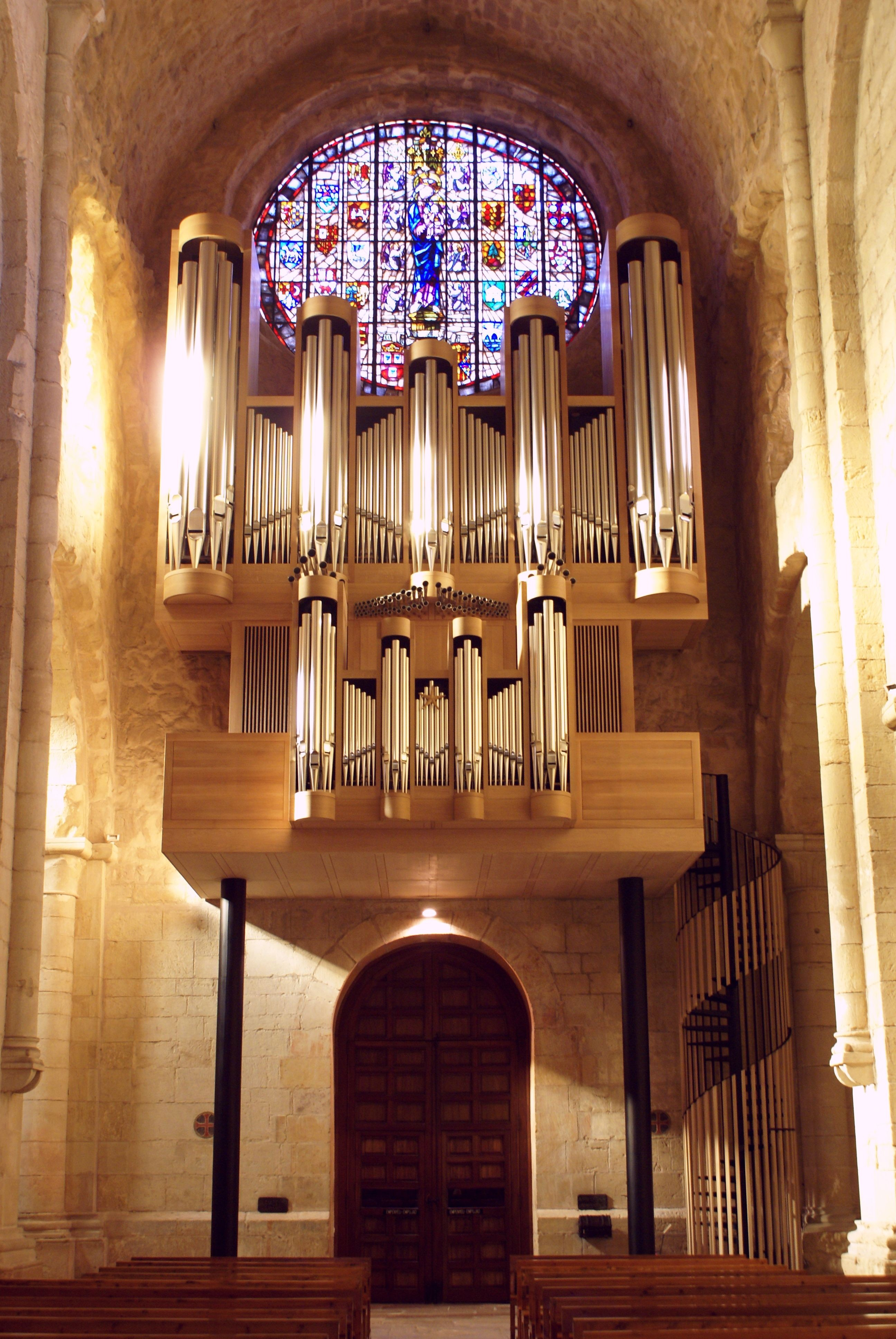
The organ of Poblet (2012), at the bottom of the abbey church.

The following is a list of compositions for organ from the Western tradition of classical organ music.

== By composer ==
- Alain, Jehan
  - Variations sur un thème de Clément Janequin
  - Le Jardin suspendu
  - Litanies
  - Trois Danses
  - Postlude pour l′office des Complines
- Albright, William
  - Sweet Sixteenths
- Bach, Johann Sebastian (See also: List of organ compositions by Johann Sebastian Bach)
  - Six Trio Sonatas (BWV 525–530)
  - Preludes and Fugues (BWV 531–551)
  - Toccatas and Fugues (BWV 564–566)
  - Orgelbüchlein (Little Organ Book) (BWV 599–644)
  - 18 Chorale Preludes (the Leipzig Chorales) (BWV 651–668)
  - Clavier-Übung III
    - Prelude in E♭ major (BWV 552/I)
    - "The German Organ Mass" (BWV 669–689)
    - 4 Duetti (BWV 802–805)
    - Fugue in E♭ major (St. Anne) (BWV 552/II)
  - Pastorale (BWV 590)
  - Passacaglia and Fugue (BWV 582)
  - The following are pieces that are thought to be wrongly attributed to Bach:
    - Eight Short Preludes and Fugues (BWV 553–560) possibly composed by Johann Tobias Krebs
    - Toccata and Fugue in D minor (BWV 565) – possibly Bach's transcription of a violin work, or indeed a piece by another composer
- Bairstow, Edward
  - Organ Sonata (1937)
- Beethoven, Ludwig van
  - Fugue in D major for organ, WoO 31 (1783)
- Berlioz, Hector
  - Hymne pour l’élévation in D major for organ, H 100 (1844)
  - Sérénade agreste à la Madone sur le thème des pifferari romains in E♭ major for organ, H 98 (1844)
  - Toccata in C major for organ, H 99 (1844)
- Boëllmann, Léon
  - Suite Gothique
- Nimrod Borenstein
  - Monologue opus 50 for solo organ (2008)
  - Kol Nidreï opus 10 for solo organ (1996)
- Brahms, Johannes
  - Fugue in ab minor WoO 8
  - Prelude and Fugue in a minor WoO 9
  - Prelude and Fugue in g minor WoO 10
  - Chorale Prelude and Fugue on „O Traurigkeit, o Herzeleid“ WoO 7
  - Eleven Chorale Preludes op. posth. 122
- Bruckner, Anton
  - Fugue in D minor for organ, WAB 125 (1861)
  - Postlude in D minor for organ, WAB 126/1 (c. 1846)
  - Andante (Prelude) in D minor for organ, WAB 126/2 (c. 1846)
  - Prelude in E♭ major for organ, WAB 127 (c. 1835, doubtful authorship, possibly by Johann Baptist Weiss)
  - Four Preludes in E♭ major for organ, WAB 128 (c. 1835, doubtful authorship, possibly by Johann Baptist Weiss)
  - Prelude (Perger Präludium) in C major for organ, WAB 129 (1884)
  - Prelude and Fugue in C minor for organ, WAB 131 (1847)
- Buxtehude, Dieterich
- Juan Bautista Cabanilles
- Cabezón, Antonio de
  - Tientos
- Aaron Copland
  - Symphony for Organ and Orchestra (Symphony no. 1) (1924)
- Costa, Fabio
  - Prelude-Meditation for Organ
- Couperin, François
  - 2 Masses
- Miguel del Aguila
  - Organ Fantasy (1993)
  - One of You (2001)
- Delbos, Claire
  - Deux pièces (1935)
  - Paraphrase sur le jugement dernier (1939)
  - L'Offrande à Marie (1943)
- Dupré, Marcel
  - Élévation op. 2
  - Trois Préludes et Fugues op. 7 (1914)
  - Scherzo op. 16 (1919)
  - Fifteen Pieces op. 18 (1919)
  - Cortège et Litanie op. 19 No. 2 (Transcription of the piano version, 1921)
  - Variations sur un Noël op. 20 (1922)
  - Suite Bretonne op. 21 (1923)
  - Symphonie-Passion op. 23 (1924)
  - Lamento op. 24 (1926)
  - Deuxième Symphonie op. 26 (1929)
  - Sept Pièces op. 27 (1931)
  - Seventy-Nine Chorales op. 28 (1931)
  - Le Chemin de la Croix op. 29 (1931)
  - Trois Élevations op. 32 (1935)
  - Angélus op. 34 No. 1 (1936)
  - Trois Préludes et Fugues op. 36 (1938)
  - Évocation op. 37 (1941)
  - Le Tombeau de Titelouze op. 38 (1942)
  - Suite op. 39 (1944)
  - Offrande à la Vierge op. 40 (1944)
  - Deux Esquisses op. 41 (1945)
  - Paraphrase on the Te Deum op. 43 (1945)
  - Vision op. 44 (1947)
  - Eight Short Preludes on Gregorian Themes op. 45 (1948)
  - Épithalame without opus (1948)
  - Variations sur 'Il est né le divin enfant' without opus (1948)
  - Miserere Mei op. 46 (1948)
  - Psaume XVIII op. 47 (1949)
  - Six Antiennes pour le Temps de Noël op. 48 (1952)
  - Vingt-Quatre Inventions op. 50 (1956)
  - Triptyque op. 51 (1957)
  - Nymphéas op. 54 (1959)
  - Annonciation op. 56 (1961)
  - Chorale et Fugue op. 57 (1962)
  - Trois Hymnes op. 58 (1963)
  - Two Chorales op. 59 (1963)
  - In Memoriam op. 61 (1965)
  - Méditation without opus (1966)
  - Entrée, Canzona et Sortie op. 62 (1967)
  - Quatre Fugues Modales op. 63 (1968)
  - Regina Coeli op. 64 (1969)
  - Vitrail op. 65 (1969)
  - Souvenir op. 65bis (1965)
- Duruflé, Maurice
  - Prélude et Fugue sur le nom d'Alain op. 7
  - Scherzo op. 2
  - Veni Creator op. 4
    - Prélude
    - Adagio
    - Chorale Variations
  - Fugue sur le carillon des heures de la cathédrale de Soissons
  - Suite for Organ (opus 5)
    - Prélude
    - Sicilienne
    - Toccata
- Elgar, Edward
  - Cantique, op. 3
  - Vesper Voluntaries, op. 14
  - Sonata in G major, op. 28
- Françaix, Jean
  - Marche solennelle (1956)
  - Suite carmélite (1960)
  - Suite profane (1984)
  - Messe de Mariage (1986)
- Franck, César
  - Six Pièces
    - Fantasie
    - Grande Pièce Symphonique
    - Prélude, Fugue et Variation
    - Pastorale
    - Prière
    - Final
  - Trois Pièces
    - Fantasie
    - Cantabile
    - Pièce héroïque
  - Trois Chorales
    - No 1. in E major
    - No 2. in B minor
    - No 3. in A minor
  - L'Organiste
- Frescobaldi, Girolamo
- Froberger, Johann Jakob
- Gigout, Eugène
  - Grand Chœur Dialogué
  - Ten Pieces
    1. Prelude-Chorale and Allegro
    2. Minuetto
    3. Absoute
    4. Toccata
    5. Andante religioso (in the form of a Canon)
    6. Rhapsodie (on Christmas carols)
    7. Offertoire ou Communion (Trio des Claviers)
    8. Scherzo
    9. Antienne (in Phrygian mode)
    10. Sortie (on Adoremus in Aeternum)
- Guilmant, Alexandre
  - Pièces dans différents styles
  - L'Organiste liturgiste, Op.65
  - Eight sonatas
- Handel, George Frederic
  - Six Organ Concertos, op.4
  - Six Organ Concertos, no op. (including 3 concerti grossi)
    - The Cuckoo and the Nightingale
  - Six Organ Concertos, op.7
- Harbison, John
  - What Do We Make of Bach? for obbligato organ and orchestra (2018)
- Harwood, Basil
  - Organ Sonata in C♯ minor, op. 5 (1886)
  - Dithyramb, op.7 (1892)
  - Paean, op.15, No. 3 (1903)
  - Toccata, op.49 (1930)
- Haydn, Franz Joseph
  - Concerto Hob. XVIII:1 in C major for organ (or harpsichord) and orchestra (1756)
  - Concerto Hob. XVIII:2 in D major for organ (or harpsichord) and orchestra (1767)
  - Concerto Hob. XVIII:6 in F major for violin and organ (or harpsichord) with string orchestra (1766)
- Haynes, Battison
  - Organ Sonata in D minor, op. 11 (1883)
- Hindemith, Paul
  - Kammermusik No. 7 for organ and chamber orchestra, Op. 46, No. 2 (1927)
  - Organ Sonata No. 1 (1937)
  - Organ Sonata No. 2 (1937)
  - Organ Sonata No. 3 (on ancient folk songs)(1940)
  - Organ Concerto (1962)
- Hovhaness, Alan
- Howells, Herbert
  - Organ Sonata No. 1 in C (1911)
  - Organ Sonata No. 2 (1933)
  - Six Pieces (1945)
    1. Fugue Chorale and Epilogue
    2. Master Tallis' Testament
    3. Paean
    4. Preludio 'Sine Nomine'
    5. Saraband (For the Morning of Easter)
    6. Saraband (In modo elegiaco)
  - Three Psalm-Preludes, Set 1 (1916)
  - Three Psalm-Preludes, Set 2 (1939)
  - Three Rhapsodies (1919)
- Ives, Charles
  - Variations on "America"
- Jongen, Joseph
- Karg-Elert, Sigfrid
- Langlais, Jean
  - Neuf Pièces
  - Fête
  - Trois Paraphrases grégoriennes
  - Suite médiévale
  - Incantation pour un jour Saint
  - Triptique
  - Diptique
  - Trois Méditations sur la Trinité
  - Cinq Méditations sur l′Ascension
  - Domenica in Palmis
  - Poème Évangélique
  - Suite Brève
  - Douze Petites Pièces
  - Rosa Mystica
  - Te Deum
  - Hymne de l′Action de Grâce
  - Livre d'Orgue (40 Pièces)
  - Livre du Sacrement
  - Prelude and Fugue
  - Scherzo
  - Toccata
  - Première Symphonie
  - Deuxième Symphonie
  - Troisième Symphonie
  - 24 Pièces pour orgue
  - 7 Chorales
  - Rosace 4 pièces diverses
  - Soleis 5 pièces pour Orgue
  - Sonatine
  - Neuf Pièces pour orgue
  - Suite Française
  - Four Postludes
  - Hommage à Frescobaldi
  - Folkloric Suite
  - Office pour la Sainte Famille
  - Office pour la Sainte Trinité
  - Poem of Life
  - Poem of Peace
  - Poem of Happiness
  - Sonata en Trio
  - Livre Écuménique
  - Deux Pièces
  - Three Voluntaries
  - Trois Implorations
  - Offrande à Marie
  - Suite Baroque
  - Huit Chants de Bretagne
  - Trois Esquisses Romanes
  - Trois Esquisses Gothiques
  - Mosaïque 1
  - Mosaïque 2
  - Mosaïque 3
  - Triptyque Grégorien
  - Progression
  - Trois Noëls
  - Offrande à une âme
  - Chant des bergers – Prière des mages
  - Prélude et allegro
  - Sept Études de Concert pour pédale solo
  - Deux Pièces brèves
  - Huit Préludes
  - Miniature II
  - Talitah Koum
  - Trois Pièces faciles
  - B.A.C.H
  - American Folk–Hymn Settings
  - In Memoriam
  - Douze Versets
  - Hommage à Rameau
  - Expressions
  - Fantasy on Two Old Scottish Themes
  - Trumpet Tune
  - Christmas Carol Hymn Settings
  - Contrastes
  - Mort et Résurrection
  - Moonlight Scherzo
  - Trois Offertoires
  - Suite in Simplicitate
  - Trio
- Jean-Pierre Leguay
  - Cinq Esquisses pour piano et orgue (1959–60)
  - Prélude, trio de timbres, fugato pour orgue (1961)
  - Au Maître de la Paix pour orgue (1963–64)
  - Cinq versets sur Veni Creator pour orgue (1965)
  - Sextuor pour flûte, hautbois, clarinet, cor, basson, piano (1967)
  - Péan I pour orgue, 3 trombones, marimba, percussions (1968–2010)
  - Gitanjâli pour grand orchestre (1969)
  - Aurore pour flûte, hautbois, violoncelle et harpe (1969–70)
  - Péan II, pour trompette et orgue (1970–71)
  - Péan III, pour orgue (1971–72)
  - Hexagonal, pour flûte et orgue (1972)
  - Angle, pour deux harpes (1972)
  - Flamme, pour hautbois ou saxophone alto (1973)
  - Sonate I pour orgue (1973–74)
  - Sève, pour saxophone et piano (1974)
  - Granit (Version I), pour 4 trombones et orgue (1975)
  - XIX Préludes, pour orgue (1965–75)
  - Job, pour choeur de femmes et orgue (1976)
  - Le matin sûrement va venir, pour Ondes Martenot, piano, percussions (1977)
  - Trio pour violon, alto et violoncelle (1978)
  - Madrigal I, pour 4 trombones (1979)
  - Madrigal II, pour orgue (1979)
  - Préludes XX, pour orgue (1980)
  - Prélude XXI, pour orgue (1980)
  - Prélude XXII, pour orgue (1980)
  - Etoilé pour clavecin ou orgue positif et 5 instrumentistes (1981)
  - Madrigal III, pour clavecin ou orgue positif (1982)
  - Prélude XXIII, pour orgue (1982)
  - Madrigal IV, pour guitare (1982)
  - Sonate II, pour orgue (1982–83)
  - Madrigal V, pour orgue (1983)
  - Scabbs, pour saxophone alto et contrebasse ou saxophone baryton (1983–84)
  - Souffle, pour 14 instrumentistes (1984)
  - Madrigal VI, pour 4 saxophones (1985)
  - Madrigal VII, pour orgue (1985)
  - Cinq pièces pour alto, contrebasse, percussions (1985–86)
  - Aube, pour orgue positif et orchestre de chambre (1986)
  - Vigiles, pour choeur, orgue, trombone, percussions (1986)
  - Madrigal VIII, pour percussions (1986–89)
  - Chant d'airain, pour trombone ténor (1986)
  - Prélude I, pour guitare (1986)
  - Granit (Version II), pour 2 trompettes, 2 trombones et orgue (1987)
  - Madrigal IX, pour orgue (1988)
  - Chant, pour choeur de femmes et percussion (1989–90)
  - Quatuor, pour quatuor à cordes (1989–95)
  - Capriccio, pour orgue (1990)
  - Azur, pour piano (1990–91)
  - Spicilège, pour orgue (1992–93)
  - Horizon, pour orgue (1995)
  - Animato, pour orgue (1995)
  - Psaume XXI, pour sextuor vocal a capella (1996–97)
  - Trois esquisses, pour flûte avec ou sans piano (1998)
  - Secundum Matthaeum, pour ténor et orgue (1999)
  - Missa Deo Gratias, pour soprano solo, chœur mixte, un ou deux orgues, cuivres et percussion (1999–2000)
  - Brève, pour orgue (2000)
  - Pater Noster, pour ténor avec ou sans orgue (2000–01)
  - Alleluia, pour ténor avec ou sans orgue (2001)
  - Sept pièces brèves, pour flûte et orgue (2003–04)
  - Péan IV, pour orgue (2004)
  - Sonate III, pour orgue (2005–06)
  - Cinq reflets, pour orgue (2006)
  - Et puis, et puis encore ?, pour orgue (2008)
  - Cendre d'ailes, pour voix de ténor et piano sur des poèmes d'Henri Michaux (2009–10)
  - Brève II, pour orgue (2010)
  - Allume l'aube dans la source, pour piano (2010–11)
  - Et il chante l'aurore, pour orgue (2012)
- Liszt, Franz
  - Fantasia and Fugue on Ad Nos, ad salutarem undam
  - Prelude and Fugue on B-A-C-H
  - Évocation à la Chapelle Sixtine
  - Variations über Weinen, Klagen, Sorgen, Zagen (organ arr. of piano piece)
- William Lloyd Webber (1914–1982)
  - Chorale, Cantilena and Finale
  - Three Recital Pieces (1952)
  - Aria, 13 Pieces
  - Reflections, 7 Pieces
  - Eight Varied Pieces
  - Songs without Words, 6 Pieces
  - Five Portraits for Home Organs
  - Elegy
  - Six Interludes on Christmas Carols
- Machajdík, Peter (1961)
  - On the Seven Colours of Light (2007)
  - Portus Pacis (2016)
  - De humilitate (2018)
  - Zem (2018)
  - Da perenne gaudium (2021)
- Magle, Frederik
  - Symphony for organ No.1 (1990)
  - Symphony for organ No.2 Let there be light (1993)
  - Human's Millenium (2000)
  - Cantilena for organ (2003)
  - Viva voce (2008)
  - To Become (2009
  - Like a Flame (2009–2010), 22 improvisations subsequently written down.
- Mathias, William
  - Prelude, Elegy and Toccata (1954)
  - Partita Op.19 (1962)
  - Variations on a Hymn Tune Op.20 (1962)
  - Postlude (1962)
  - Processional (1964)
  - Chorale (Easter 1966)
  - Invocations Op.35 (1967)
  - Toccata Giocosa Op.36 No.2 (1967) Dedicated to Sir David Willcocks on the occasion of his Inauguration of the new organ at The Royal College of Organists, 7 October 1967
  - Jubilate Op.67, No.2 (1974) Dedicated to Michael Smythe
  - Fantasy Op.78 (1978)
  - Canzonetta Op.78 No.2 (1978)
  - Antiphonies Op.88 No.2 (1982)
  - Berceuse Op.95 No.3 (1985)
  - Recessional Op.96 No.4 (1986) Dedicated to Christopher Morris, musician, publisher, friend
  - Fanfare (1987)
  - Carillon (1989)
  - Fenestra (1989)
- Mendelssohn, Felix
  - Three Preludes and Fugues, Op.37
  - Six Sonatas (1844–1845)
    - No. 1 in F minor
    - No. 2 in C minor
    - No. 3 in A major (Aus tiefer Not schrei ich zu dir)
    - No. 4 in Bb major
    - No. 5 in D major
    - No. 6 in D minor (Vater unser im Himmelreich)
- Messiaen, Olivier
  - Le Banquet Céleste (1928)
  - Diptyque (1929)
  - Apparition de l'église éternelle (1931)
  - L'Ascension (1933) – 4 méditations
  - La Nativité du Seigneur (1935) – 9 méditations
  - Les Corps glorieux (1939) – 7 short visions
  - Messe de la Pentecôte (1950)
  - Livre d'orgue (1951) – 7 pièces
  - Verset pour la Fête de la Dédicace (1960)
  - Méditations sur le Mystère de la Sainte Trinité (1969) – 9 pièces
  - Livre du Saint-Sacrement (1984) – 18 pièces
- Mozart, Wolfgang Amadeus
  - Church Sonatas Nos. 1–17 (for 2 violins, cello, bass and organ)
  - Adagio and Allegro in F minor for a mechanical organ, K. 594
  - Fantasia in F minor for mechanical organ, K. 608
  - Andante in F major for mechanical organ, K. 616
- Pachelbel, Johann
  - 7 Preludes
  - 15 Toccatas
  - 3 Fantasias
  - 2 Ricercares
  - Prelude and Fugue in E minor
  - Toccata and Fugue in B♭ major
  - 19 Fugues
  - 98 Magnificat Fugues
  - 72 Chorale Settings
- Palestine, Charlemagne
  - Spectral Continuum (1970–81)
  - Schlingen-Blängen (1985)
  - Schlongo!!!daLUVdrone (1998)
- Pincemaille, Pierre
  - Prologue et Noël varié, Delatour (2007)
- Poulenc, Francis
  - Concerto for Organ, Tympani and Strings
- Reger, Max
- Reubke, Julius
  - Sonata on the 94th Psalm
- Rheinberger, Josef
  - 2 organ concertos
  - 20 organ sonatas
  - 12 Fughettas, Op. 123
  - 12 Monologues, Op. 162
  - 12 Meditations, Op. 167
  - Preludes, trios, character pieces
  - Works for solo instruments (violin and oboe) with organ
- Saint-Saëns, Camille
  - Op. 78 Symphony No. 3 (Saint-Saëns) (1886)
  - Op. 99 Preludes and Fugues for organ (1894)
    - Prelude and Fugue in E♭ major, no. 3.
  - Op. 101 Fugatos from the organ works: Fantasia in D♭ major for organ (1866)
  - Op. 109 Preludes and Fugues for organ (1898)
- Salieri, Antonio
  - Concerto for organ and orchestra in C major (1773)
- Schumann, Robert
  - Six Studies in the Form of Canons for Organ, Op. 56 (1845)
  - Four Sketches for Organ, Op. 58 (1845)
  - Six Fugues on B-A-C-H for Organ, Op. 60 (1845)
- Seixas, Jose Antonio Carlos de
- Serry, Sr., John
  - Processional (Wedding March for Organ, 1968)
  - Elegy ( Liturgical organ, 1986)
  - A Savior Is Born (Liturgical, Organ & Voice 1991)
  - The Lord's Prayer (Liturgical, Organ & Chorus 1992)
  - American Rhapsody (revised for Organ 2002)
  - Concerto for Free Bass Accordion (revised for Organ 2002)
- Shchetynsky, Alexander
  - Shapes and Colours (1999)
  - Sonata (2021)
- Dave Soldier
  - Hockets and Inventions, op. 6 (1990)
  - Organum, Book I, op. 23 (2011)
- Svoboda, Tomas
  - Symphony No. 3 for Organ & Orchestra, op. 43 (1965)
  - Offertories for Organ (Vol. I), op. 52a (1949–96)
  - Wedding March for Organ, op. 94 (1979)
  - Nocturne for Organ, 4-hand, op.155 (1996)
  - Duo Concerto for Trumpet & Organ, op. 152 (1997)
- Sweelinck, Jan Pieterszoon
  - Fantasias, toccatas, variations on hymns and songs
- Tal, Josef (1910–2008)
  - Salva venia (1983)
- Titelouze, Jean (ca 1563–1633)
  - Hymnes de l'Église pour toucher sur l'orgue (1623)
  - Le Magnificat (1626)
- Tournemire, Charles
  - L'Orgue Mystique
- Vierne, Louis
  - Organ Symphonies
    - No. 1 in D minor (Op. 14, 1899)
    - No. 2 in E minor (Op. 20, 1902)
    - No. 3 in F♯ minor (Op. 28, 1911)
    - No. 4 in G minor (Op. 32, 1914)
    - No. 5 in A minor (Op. 47, 1924)
    - No. 6 in B minor (Op. 59, 1930)
  - 24 Pièces de Fantaisie
    - Suite 1
      - Prélude
      - Andantino
      - Caprice
      - Intermezzo
      - Requiem aeternam
      - Marche nuptiale
    - Suite 2
      - Lamento
      - Sicilienne
      - Hymne au Soleil
      - Feux Follets
      - Clair de Lune
      - Toccata
    - Suite 3
      - Dédicace
      - Impromptu
      - Étoile du Soir
      - Fantômes
      - Sur le Rhin
      - Carillon de Westminster
    - Suite 4
      - Aubade
      - Résignation
      - Cathédrales
      - Naïades
      - Gargouilles et chimères
      - Les Cloches de Hinckley
- Vivaldi, Antonio
  - Largo & Andante for organ in A major, RV 746 (arranged from first and third movements of Violin Sonata in A major, RV 758, Manchester Sonata No.6)
- Waterhouse, Graham
  - Variations on a Theme of Pachelbel, Op. 6, 1981
- Whitlock, Percy
  - Organ Sonata in C minor (1935-6)
- Widor, Charles-Marie
  - Symphonie pour orgue No. 1 op. 13 no. 1 (1872, Julien Hamelle)
  - Symphonie pour orgue No. 2 op. 13 no. 2 (1872, Hamelle)
  - Symphonie pour orgue No. 3 op. 13 no. 3 (1872, Hamelle)
  - Symphonie pour orgue No. 4 op. 13 no. 4 (1872, Hamelle)
  - Marche Américaine (transc. by Marcel Dupré: no. 11 from 12 Feuillets d’Album op. 31, Hamelle)
  - Symphonie pour orgue No. 5 op. 42 no. 1 (1879, Hamelle)
  - Symphonie pour orgue No. 6 op. 42 no. 2 (1879, Hamelle)
  - Symphonie pour orgue No. 7 op. 42 no. 3 (1887, Hamelle)
  - Symphonie pour orgue No. 8 op. 42 no. 4 (1887, Hamelle)
  - Marche Nuptiale op. 64 (1892) (trasc., from Conte d'Avril, Hamelle)
  - Symphonie pour orgue No. 9 "Gothique" op. 70 (1895, Schott)
  - Symphonie pour orgue No. 10 "Romane" op. 73 (1900, Hamelle)
  - Suite Latine op. 86 (1927, Durand)
  - Trois Nouvelles Pièces op. 87 (1934, Durand)
  - Bach's Memento (1925, Hamelle)
- Wolstenholme, William
  - Organ Sonata in F (1896)

== See also ==
- Organ Symphony
- List of organ symphonies
- List of organ composers

== Principal source ==
- A Directory of Composers for Organ by Dr. John Henderson, Hon. Librarian to the Royal School of Church Music 2005 3rd edition ISBN 0-9528050-2-2
