= Organ of the Trocadéro Palace =

Hall organ built in Paris in 1878

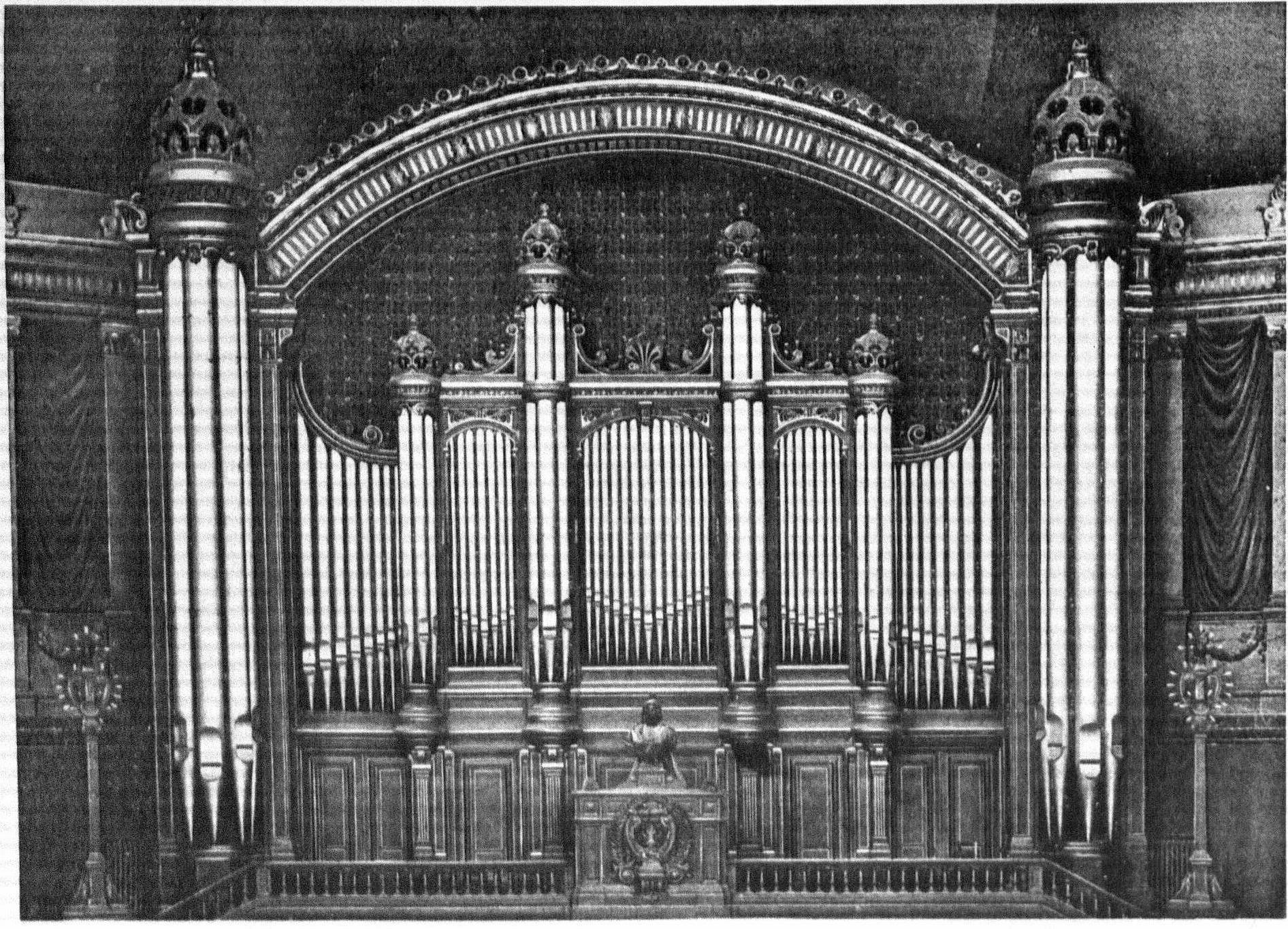
The organ in its original setting, the Trocadéro Palace (1878)

The organ of the Trocadéro Palace is a four-manual pipe organ originally built by Aristide Cavaillé-Coll for the 1878 Universal Exhibition at the Palais du Trocadéro in Paris, France, now located at the Maurice Ravel Auditorium in Lyon. Promoted by many of the key exponents of the French organ school, Alexandre Guilmant, Charles-Marie Widor, Marcel Dupré, and more, the instrument is the oldest concert hall organ in the country. It was transferred to the Palais de Chaillot in 1937, before moving to its current setting forty years later. Much renovated in later years, it is generally considered to be one of the most important musical instruments in France.

== History ==
In 1878, a large concert hall designed by Gabriel Davioud was inaugurated on the Trocadéro on Chaillot hill in Paris. It was to serve as a backdrop to the Exposition universelle being held on the other side of the Seine, on the Champ de Mars. Constructed amidst the Paris Commune, the government aimed to give Paris its first public concert hall (all the others were private) and its first publicly hearable organ outside of a church.

=== Construction ===
Aristide Cavaillé-Coll, who had previous experience building concert hall organs in Sheffield (1873) and the Palais de l'Industrie in Amsterdam (1875), was chosen for the contract. He borrowed the pipework of a 46-stop organ of three manuals originally built for the newly-constructed Notre-Dame-d'Auteuil, located near the Trocadéro, which served as the backbone of the instrument. His contract stipulated that it would be removed fifteen days following the exhibition's closure. However, Rollin Smith says that this instrument was originally designed not for Notre-Dame-d'Auteuil (then still being planned) but for an unknown client, who would later terminate his contract. Its parish priest, Father Lamazou, acquired the instrument at a reduced price for the community.

An order was further placed for an additional 32-foot pedal division with ten stops, to be used at a later date in the construction of the organ planned for the Trocadéro, and for pewter pipes.

Cavaillé-Coll adapted the material to the 5,000-seat hall of the Trocadéro (Note: See the photograph:) by increasing the number of manuals (from three to four) and stops (from 46 to 66), favouring thicker fundaments to compensate for poorly reverberant acoustics. The organ became one of the largest of its time, incorporating the latest technical innovations: Barker levers, windchests and bellows producing wide ranges of pressures capable of satisfying considerable wind requirements, a precombiner, and much more.

The æsthetic was romantic, expressive and symphonic. Its design dispensed with classical mutations and mixtures, favouring an abundance of eight-foot foundations, a strengthening of the bass (16' and 32'), and stops of 'concertante' texture: undulating stops (Voix céleste, Unda maris), and reeds and flues of 'orchestral' nature (Violoncellos, Gambes, Diapason, Clarinet), and so on. Furthermore, two manuals were enclosed in swell boxes: both the Positif and Récit, instead of merely the latter.

=== Inauguration and first concert series ===
The first concert took place on 6 June 1878, with Édouard Colonne conducting an orchestra of 350 forces in Félicien David's symphonic ode Le Désert and Camille Saint-Saëns' cantata Les Noces de Prométhée.

The instrument was formally inaugurated on 7 August 1878 by Alexandre Guilmant, one of the instrument's key sponsors. He played his Marche funèbre and Chant séraphique. Also on the programme were works by Jacques-Nicolas Lemmens (his teacher), Giovanni Battista Martini, Charles-Alexis Chauvet, George Frideric Handel, Johann Sebastian Bach's Toccata and Fugue in D minor, BWV 565, and Felix Mendelssohn.

Sxteen concerts were given regularly until 8 October 1878, when the exposition ended. Organists who played included Eugène Gigout (13 August), Théodore Dubois (21 August), Camille Saint-Saëns (28 September), and André Messager (8 October). The two most notable concerts were those delivered by Charles-Marie Widor on 24 August (premièring his Symphony for Organ No. 6), and César Franck on 1 October; (premièring his Trois pièces). These works have become staples of the organ repertoire. In addition to the official run, Jacques-Nicolas Lemmens and his wife Helen Lemmens-Sherrington, who were staying in Paris at the time, gave a concert in September, accompanied by Guilmant and Paul Taffanel.

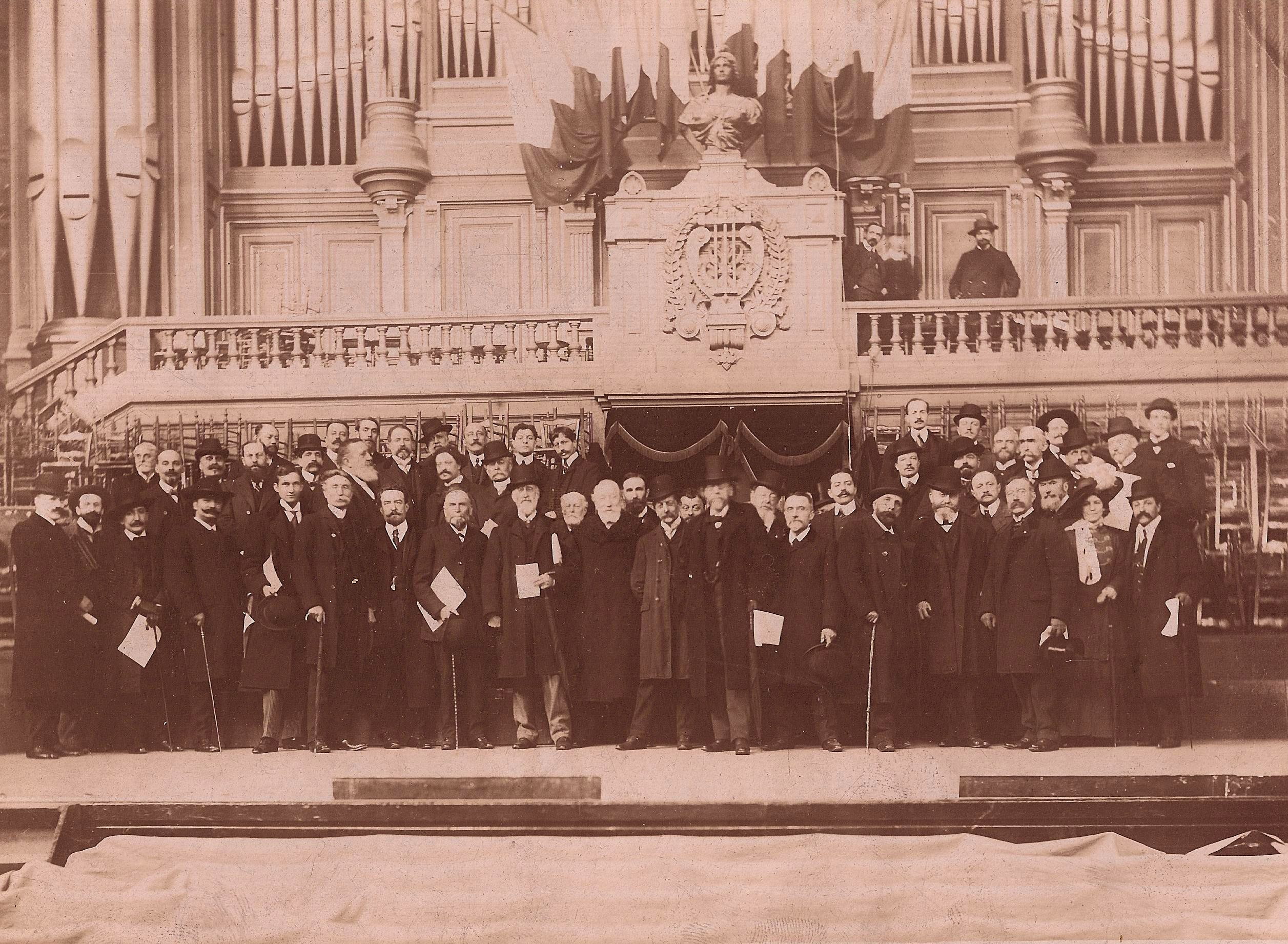
A photograph of the event. Notable attendees include: *First row: Stan Golestan (third), Xavier Leroux, Robert Lyon (representative of Pleyel), Gaston Carraud (seventh), Théodore Dubois (ninth), Jean d'Estournelles de Constant (Director of Fine Arts), Étienne Dujardin-Beaumetz, Charles-Marie Widor (bearded), Paul Vidal, Wanda Landowska and Pierre Monteux. * 2nd row: Reynaldo Hahn (fifth), Raoul Pugno, Philippe Gaubert, lower down, Henri Rabaud, moving up to the left of the drape, Francis Casadesus (second). * 3rd row: Paul Dukas (fifth), Gustave Lyon (representative of Pleyel), George Enescu, André Bloch, to the right of the drape: Alexandre Georges (third), Paul Le Flem, Roger Lion (representative of Pleyel).

=== Guilmant concert series ===
Following the exposition's conclusion, the organ remained at Notre-Dame-d'Auteuil until the following summer. Alexandre Guilmant, by now regarded unofficially as its 'incumbent', then organised a new concert series, ranging from solo organ performances to ones accompanied by other instruments. On 19 October 1879, Widor gave the first public performance of his Symphony for Organ No. 5 (however, in June, he played either his fifth or sixth symphony or both of them at a private concert) before Edmond Turquet, Minister of Fine Arts.

Guilmant promoted early music in his recitals, performing numerous works by Johann Sebatian Bach, Dietrich Buxtehude, Girolamo Frescobaldi, Louis-Nicolas Clérambault and others, as well as Handel's complete organ concerti.

Lamazou wrote the government in order to retrieve the organ's pipework for his parish, but owing to the interpolations of Guilmant and Widor, the concert hall had legally owned it since 1882. Cavaillé-Coll and Lamazou signed a contract for a two-manual, 32-stop instrument, which was inaugurated in the church on 11 February 1885.

The Trocadéro hall's acoustics proved inadequate for non-organ music. As a result, the building was known simply for hosting organ concerts. Until 1926, French, European and even American organists performed in the hall, whose rental costs were known for their exorbitant schemes.

During the 1889 Universal Exhibition, Widor premiered his eighth symphony for solo organ. On 11 June 1896, he conducted his Third Symphony for organ and orchestra, op. 69, with his pupil Louis Vierne as soloist.

=== Dupré concert series ===
The instrument faced escalating mechanical issues alongside a notable shortage of funds in the early twentieth century. Guilmant died in 1911, followed by the onset of World War I, further compounded the organ's challenges.

Despite these encumbrances, Saint-Saëns nevertheless officiated the French premiere of Cyprès et lauriers to commemorate allied victory in 1920, whose organ part was played by Eugène Gigout. That same year, Marcel Dupré performed the complete organ works of Johann Sebastian Bach over a series of ten recitals, all of which he memorised. While unprecedented, this was actually a repetition of a marathon he played at the Salle du Conservatoire de Paris. He would later give a series of six recitals in the spring, playing both his works and those of well-known composers.

Nevertheless, its condition would deteriorate further; among other parties, Louis Vierne voiced concern. When Dupré played the French première of his Symphonie-Passion to an audience of 3,000 on 30 April 1925, its poor state was very obvious. In 1926, following his succession of Gigout as organ professor at the Conservatoire de Paris, Dupré used his additional prestige to raise funds from his colleagues by giving a charity recital. Dupré served as chief consultant for its restoration back to its original state, and reinaugurated it on 2 March 1927. He performed there six more times, most famously to première his Le Chemin de la Croix on 14 August 1932. His final concert was on 14 August 1935, before the building was demolished.

=== After the Trocadéro ===
Following the destruction of the Trocadéro, the instrument was put in storage until it was placed in the new Palais de Chaillot in 1937. In 1977, it was moved to the Maurice Ravel Auditorium in Lyon.

== The instrument ==
=== Characteristics ===
Originally, the organ featured the following:

- Four manual keyboards of 56 notes (C to g''') and a 30-note pedalboard (C to f').
- 66 stops with 85 ranks.
- Differentiated pressures within each division, for the sake of balance (Petite Pédale/Grande Pédale/32' divisions on the Pédale, foundations and reeds on the GO, bass and treble on the Solo).
- Tracker action with two Barker levers.

=== Combination pedals ===
- Grand Orgue Pedal coupler
- Positif Pedal coupler
- Récit Pedal coupler
- Grand Orgue flue ventil
- Grand Orgue reed ventil
- Récit reed ventil
- Positif reed ventil
- Solo-Bombarde reed ventil
- Pedal reed ventil
- Pos./G.O. coupler
- Réc/G.O. coupler
- Solo-Bombarde/G.O. coupler
- Rec./Pos. coupler
- Grand Orgue suboctave coupler
- Positif suboctave coupler
- Récit suboctave coupler
- Solo-Bombarde suboctave coupler
- Orage
- Positif Tremulant
- Récit Tremulant
- Positif swell pedal
- Récit swell pedal

=== Composition ===
(An): stops controlled by reed switches

I. Grand Orgue (Great)	II. Positif expressif (Expressive Choir)	III. Récit expressif (Expressive Swell)	IV. Solo-Bombarde (Solo Bombarde)	Pédale (Pedal)
Montre 16 Bourdon 16 Montre 8 Cello 8 Flûte harmonique 8 Bourdon 8 Prestant 4 Flûte douce 4 (An) Doublette 2 (an) Dessus de Cornet V (an) Plein-jeu harmonique V (an) Bombarde 16 (an) Trompette 8 (an) Clairon 4 (an)	Bourdon 16 Principal 8 Flûte harmonique 8 Salicional 8 Unda maris 8 Flûte octaviante 4 Quinte 2 2/3 (An) Doublette 2 (An) Plein-jeu harmonique III-VI (an) Basson 16 (an) Trompette 8 (an) Cromorne 8 (an)	Quintaton 16 Flûte harmonique 8 Cor de nuit 8 Viole de gambe 8 Voix céleste 8 Flûte octaviante 4 Octavin 2 (An) Cornet V (An) Carillon I-III Basson 16 (an) Trompette 8 (an) Basson-hautbois 8 Voix humaine 8 Clairon harmonique 4 (an)	Bourdon 16 Flûte harmonique 8 Diapason 8 Violoncelle 8 Flûte octaviante 4 Octavin 2 Tuba magna 16 (an) Trompette harmonique 8 (an) Clarinette 8 (an) Clairon harmonique 4 (an)	Principal basse 32 Basse 16 Contrebasse 16 Grosse flûte 16 Violonbasse 16 Grosse flûte flute 8 Basse 8 Bourdon 8 Violoncelle 8 Contre bombarde 32 (an) Bombarde 16 (an) Basson 16 (an) Trompette 8 (an) Basson 8 (an) Baryton 4 (an) Clairon 4 (an)

== Works created on the instrument ==
CM = world premiere

CF = French première

PEP = first public performance

- Marcel Dupré: Symphonie-Passion – CF 30 April 1925, by the composer
- Marcel Dupré: Le Chemin de la Croix – CM 18 March 1932, by the author
- Gabriel Fauré: Requiem, definitive version for soloists, choir, organ, and orchestra – CM 12 July 1900, by Eugène Gigout (organ), the Conservatoire Choir and Orchestra conducted by Paul Taffanel
- César Franck: Three Pieces (Fantasy in A, Cantabile, Pièce héroïque) – CM 1 October 1878, by the composer
- Charles Gounod: La Rédemption, oratorio for recitalists, soloists, choir, organ, and orchestra – CF 3 April 1884
- Charles Gounod: Mors et vita, oratorio for soloists, choir, organ, and orchestra – CF 2 May 1886
- Alexandre Guilmant: Première Symphonie, for organ and orchestra – CM 22 August 1878, by the author
- Alexandre Guilmant: Second Symphony, for organ and orchestra – CM 31 December 1911, by Joseph Bonnet (organ) and the Orchestre Lamoureux, conducted by Camille Chevillard)
- Franz Liszt: Fantasy and Fugue on the chorale "Ad nos, ad salutarem undam" – CF 28 September 1878, by Camille Saint-Saëns.
- Camille Saint-Saëns: Cyprès et Lauriers, op. 156, for organ and orchestra – CF 24 October 1920, by Eugène Gigout at the organ and the Société des Concerts du Conservatoire, conducted by Jules Garcin
- Charles-Marie Widor: Grave in C minor (by the author) – CM
- Charles-Marie Widor: Cinquième Symphonie, for solo organ – PEP 19 October 1879, by the author (a private audition had taken place previously)
- Charles-Marie Widor: Sixth Symphony, for solo organ – CM 24 August 1878, by the author
- Charles-Marie Widor: Eighth Symphony, for solo organ – CM 3 July 1879, by the author

== See also ==
- Trocadéro Palace
- Louis Vierne
- Paul Taffanel
- Marcel Dupré
- Jacques-Nicolas Lemmens
- Notre-Dame d'Auteuil

== Bibliography ==
- Smith, Rollin (1995). Archbold and, Lawrence; J. Peterson., William (eds.). The Organ of the Trocadéro and Its Players in French Organ Music from the Revolution to Franck and Widor. University of Rochester Pre.
- de la Gaulayrie, Christiane Frain (1986). Heurs et malheurs de la colline de Chaillot (Les orgues du Trocadéro), (S.H.A.P) Tome XV N°4. Bulletin N° 133 de la Société Historique d'Auteuil et de Passy.
