= Organ repertoire =

Set of available musical works for organ

The organ repertoire comprises music written or arranged for the organ. Its surviving written history can be traced to early keyboard manuscripts such as the 14th-century Robertsbridge Codex and the 15th-century Faenza Codex, although keyboard music was not generally written for a specific instrument until the 16th century. By the Renaissance, composers including Thomas Tallis, William Byrd, and Jan Pieterszoon Sweelinck contributed to a repertoire strongly associated with contrapuntal forms.

During the Baroque era, distinctive national traditions developed. French organ music was largely liturgical and closely related to standardized organ design, while German and Austrian composers developed both chorale-based forms and free works such as preludes, toccatas, fantasias, and fugues. Johann Sebastian Bach wrote extensively in both traditions. George Frideric Handel also contributed a substantial body of organ concertos. Organ composition was less prominent during the Classical era, but revived in the 19th century.

In the Romantic era, changes in organ construction expanded the instrument's expressive and dynamic range. In France, the instruments of Aristide Cavaillé-Coll encouraged the development of a symphonic style associated with composers such as César Franck, Charles-Marie Widor, and Louis Vierne. In Germany, major contributions came from Felix Mendelssohn, Josef Rheinberger, Franz Liszt, Julius Reubke, and Max Reger. During the 20th century the repertoire diversified further, encompassing concert works by composers including Marcel Dupré, Maurice Duruflé, Olivier Messiaen, and György Ligeti, as well as music for the theater organ, the Hammond organ, evangelical styles, transcriptions, and hymn-based improvisations.

== Renaissance ==
The earliest surviving keyboard compositions (keyboard music was not instrument-specific until the sixteenth century) are from England (Robertsbridge Codex c. 1365) and Italy (Faenza Codex, 15th century). The organ is specified in Marco Antonio Cavazzoni's Recerchari, motetti, canzoni [...] libro primo, printed in Venice in 1523.

The English virginal style was a manner of composition and performance prevalent in the sixteenth and early seventeenth centuries; some manuscripts are preserved in the Fitzwilliam Virginal Book. Sweelinck was strongly influenced by this style. Organ music was based almost exclusively on learned counterpoint, exemplified by the Fantasia ("Fancy"), as well as works based on contrapuntal treatment of chant. Many composers well known for their choral works wrote organ music as well, for example Tallis, Byrd, and Gibbons.

== Baroque ==
=== France ===
In France, Baroque organ music (referred to as French classical music, despite being from the Baroque period) was almost exclusively liturgical in nature and was composed and performed in a very systemized manner. In addition, the organs were built along standardized lines. The compositions were of smaller scale than those composed in other countries. Some of the forms (the Plein jeu, the Récit de Cromorne, and the Tierce en Taille, for example) utilized almost no counterpoint, while others (the Duo, the Trio, and the Fugue) were contrapuntal in nature (though the counterpoint was not generally as complex as in Germany).

=== England ===
Handel contributed significantly to the organ repertoire through his numerous organ concertos.

=== Germany ===
In Germany and Austria, Baroque organ music utilized increasing amounts of counterpoint. Organ music in the Baroque can be divided into works based on Lutheran chorales (e.g., chorale preludes and chorale fantasias) and those not (e.g. toccatas, fantasias, and free preludes). There are marked stylistic differences between the composers of North, South, and Central Germany such that further generalisation is inaccurate. The North German Praeludium (an important form consisting of alternating sections of free material written in the largely misunderstood stylus phantasticus and fugal material) reached its zenith in the music of Dieterich Buxtehude, informed by Matthias Weckmann and Heinrich Scheidemann (influenced most strongly by Jan Pieterszoon Sweelinck and by the Italian school transported to North Germany by Heinrich Schütz and Samuel Scheidt). Georg Böhm remained firmly representative of the South German School, though Johann Pachelbel's influence as a teacher extended across North, South, and Central Germany. Baroque organ music arguably reached its height in the works of Johann Sebastian Bach. Many of Bach's earlier free works are heavily influenced by Buxtehude's style, but much more importantly, Bach developed a style essentially separate from the predominant styles of North, South, and Central Germany. The majority of his free works consisted of two parts: a prelude, toccata, or fantasia, and a fugue. Bach also wrote a large number of chorale preludes.

== Classical era ==
The great composers of the classical era wrote sparingly if at all for the organ: Haydn wrote for clockwork organs and wrote several concertos for organ and orchestra. Beethoven and Mozart wrote only a handful of works. František Brixi and Georg Christoph Wagenseil also wrote organ concertos. All of these works are restricted to a single manual.

English composers John Stanley and William Boyce wrote a number of important works at this time but should be considered composers of the Baroque, not Classical era.

== Romantic era ==
=== France ===
During the Romantic era, technological advances allowed new features to be added to the organ, increasing its potential for expression. The work of the French organ builder Aristide Cavaillé-Coll in particular represented a great leap in organ building. Cavaillé-Coll refined the English swell box by devising a spring-loaded (later balanced) pedal with which the organist could operate the swell shutters. He invented an ingenious pneumatic combination action system for his five-manual organ at Saint-Sulpice. He adjusted pipemaking and voicing (final regulation of the pitch and tone) techniques, thus creating a whole family of stops imitating orchestral instruments such as the bassoon, the oboe, and the flute. He introduced divided windchests which were controlled by ventils, allowing for the use of higher wind pressures. For a mechanical tracker action to operate under these higher wind pressures, pneumatic assistance provided by the Barker lever was required, which Cavaillé-Coll included in his larger instruments. This pneumatic assist made it possible to couple all the manuals together and play on the full organ without expending a great deal of effort. All these innovations allowed the organist to execute a seamless crescendo from pianissimo to fortissimo: something that had never before been possible by the organ. Composers were now able to write music for the organ which mirrored that played by the symphony orchestra. For this reason, both the organs and the literature of this time period are considered symphonic.

César Franck, Charles-Marie Widor, and Félix-Alexandre Guilmant were important organist-composers who were inspired by the sounds made possible through Cavaillé-Coll's advances in organ building. They wrote extensively for the organ, and their works have endured. A particularly important form of organ composition in the Romantic era was the organ symphony, first seen in César Franck's Grand pièce symphonique and refined in the ten symphonies of Widor and the six of Louis Vierne. The organ symphony, comprising several movements, paralleled symphonies written for the orchestra. Guilmant wrote several compositions similar to organ symphonies; however, preferring to remain in the classical mold, he called them sonatas. In addition to organ symphonies, composers of the day wrote in other forms: Franck wrote eleven other major organ works, including the Prélude, Fugue et Variation and the Trois Chorals; Widor wrote a Suite Latine on various plainsong tunes; Vierne composed 24 pièces de fantaisie, of which the Carillon de Westminster is perhaps the best known. The influence of these composers has persisted through generations of composers for the organ, all the way to the 20th- and 21st-century composers like Olivier Messiaen and Naji Hakim, and modern-day improvisers like Pierre Cochereau and Pierre Pincemaille.

=== Germany ===
In Germany, a revival of interest in organ music began with Felix Mendelssohn who wrote six Sonatas, three Preludes and Fugues, and several smaller works for the organ. Josef Rheinberger wrote 20 sonatas for the organ and numerous smaller works, all of which blend the romantic style with the contrapuntal complexity of the old German masters. Johannes Brahms and Robert Schumann did not leave any large-scale works for the organ, but both left behind some smaller works which have attracted considerable attention. During the mid-19th century, composers such as Franz Liszt and Julius Reubke wrote works for the organ of immense scale. Organs being built during this time were larger and had greater dynamic range than organs of the Baroque period, and Romantic composers were determined to exploit the capabilities of these instruments. One of Liszt's most famous organ works is his Fantasy and Fugue on the chorale Ad nos ad salutarem undam. The entire 30-minute work is based on a single theme by Giacomo Meyerbeer and it shows the influence of Liszt's Sonata in B minor for piano. Liszt's student, Reubke, wrote a programmatic Sonata on the 94th Psalm in C minor based on selected verses from that psalm. The work, while original in its own right, is heavily influenced by the work of Liszt. These two works are the most monumental compositions for the organ from the mid-19th century.

Organ music in Germany at the end of the 19th century is dominated by the towering figure of Max Reger. Reger's works represent extreme Romanticism; extremely dense harmonies, sudden dynamic contrasts, and extensive forms are all present in Reger's organ works.

In the 20th century, German organ music was strongly influenced by the neo-Baroque movement. A revival of interest in Baroque forms and performance practices led to a rejection of the complexity and Romanticism of Liszt and Reger. Important composers of this period are Hugo Distler and Paul Hindemith. Hindemith is widely known for his three organ sonatas. Distler's organ music is not as well known, and Distler is remembered primarily as a choral composer. His most popular work is the Partita on "Nun komm, der Heiden Heiland", a work which treats the old Lutheran chorale in a clearly modern idiom.

=== United States ===
In the United States, Dudley Buck was a prominent composer, although his work has remained largely unknown outside of the U.S.

During this time, transcriptions of other music (usually orchestral music or piano solos) for organ became popular. Often the transcriptions would utilize only an excerpt of the original piece. The most famous transcriber for the organ is Edwin Lemare. He transcribed hundreds of works for the organ, the most memorable being his transcriptions of Wagner works.

== 20th century ==
During the 20th century, there were a number of independent trends in organ repertoire:

- Composers making a major contribution to the organ repertoire include Marcel Dupré, Maurice Duruflé, Herbert Howells, Jean Langlais, Jean-Pierre Leguay, György Ligeti, Olivier Messiaen, Kaikhosru Sorabji and Leo Sowerby.
- The theater organ achieved a brief period of prominence from about 1900–1935, and had its own repertoire.
- The Hammond organ was used in jazz, popular music and rock, especially from about 1950–1975.
- There was an evangelical organ style derived in part from the southern gospel movement, with composers including Fred Bock, Lani Smith, and Harold De Cou.
- Transcriptions of previous works, and improvisations based on hymn tunes, continued to be written in a fairly traditional style by organist-composers such as Searle Wright, Dale Wood, E. Power Biggs and Pierre Pincemaille.

== See also ==
- List of organ composers
- List of compositions for organ
