= Op. 23 =

In music, Op. 23 stands for Opus number 23. Compositions that are assigned this number include:

- Barber – Medea
- Beethoven – Violin Sonata No. 4
- Chopin – Ballade No. 1
- Dvořák – Piano Quartet No. 1
- Franck – Prélude, Aria et Final
- Gál – Das Lied der Nacht
- Grieg – Morning Mood
- Grieg – Peer Gynt
- Kabalevsky – Piano Concerto No. 2
- MacDowell – Piano Concerto No. 2
- Medea – Medea's Dance of Vengeance
- Myaskovsky – Symphony No. 6
- Rachmaninoff – Preludes, Op. 23
- Sarasate's Spanish Dances, Book III
- Schumann – Nachtstücke
- Scriabin – Piano Sonata No. 3
- Sibelius – Songs for Mixed Chorus from the 1897 Promotional Cantata, song cycle for soloists and mixed choir (arranged 1898)
- Strauss – Macbeth
- Tchaikovsky – Piano Concerto No. 1
- Widor – Surrexit a mortuis
- Wirén – Violin Concerto, for violin and orchestra (1946)
