= List of organ symphonies =

An organ symphony is a piece for solo pipe organ in various movements. It is a symphonic genre, not so much in musical form (in which it is more similar to the organ sonata or suite), but in imitating orchestral tone color, texture, and symphonic process.

Though the very first organ symphony was written by German composer Wilhelm Valentin Volckmar in 1867, the genre is mainly associated with French romanticism. César Franck wrote what is considered to be the first French organ symphony in his Grande Pièce Symphonique several years earlier, and the composers Charles-Marie Widor, who wrote ten organ symphonies, and his pupil Louis Vierne, who wrote six, continued to cultivate the genre. Modern composers such as Jean Guillou have written organ symphonies as well.

The term organ symphony is also used occasionally to refer to orchestral symphonies with a prominent solo role for an organ (as distinct from an organ concerto). The best known examples of such pieces are Camille Saint-Saëns's Symphony No. 3 and the Symphony for Organ and Orchestra by Aaron Copland, though strictly speaking such pieces are closer in form to orchestral symphonies than to the solo organ works described above.

This page lists the best known symphonies for solo pipe organ and symphonies for orchestra and organ. Organ concertos (such as those by George Frideric Handel, Francis Poulenc, and David Briggs) are not listed here; neither are orchestral symphonies featuring calling for organ where the organ does not have a prominent solo part (such as those by Gustav Mahler or Arnold Bax).

== Symphonies for solo organ ==
=== Kalevi Aho (1949–) ===
- Alles Vergängliche. Symphony for organ (2007)

=== Elfrida Andrée (1841–1929) ===
- Symphonic Poem in E minor (orchestra version: Varför och därför, F minor, 1874)
- Organ Symphony No. 1 i B minor (1891)

=== Augustin Barié (1883–1915) ===
- Symphony for organ, Op. 5 (1911)

=== Edward Shippen Barnes (1887–1958) ===
- First Symphony for Organ "Symphonie pour orgue", Op. 18 (1918)
- Second Symphony for Organ, Op. 37 (1923)

=== Joseph-Ermend Bonnal (1880–1944) ===
- Symphonie d'après Media Vita (1932)

=== Émile Bourdon (1884–1974) ===
- Symphonie, Op. 10
- Allegro symphonique, Op. 32

=== Alexandre Eugène Cellier (1883–1968) ===
- Suite symphonique for organ in G major (1906)
- Pièce symphonique (1911)

=== Pierre Cochereau (1924–1984) ===
- Symphonie for organ (1950–1955)
- Numerous improvised symphonies recorded

=== Clarence Dickinson (1873–1969) ===
- Organ Symphony “Storm King” (1920)

=== Marcel Dupré (1886–1971) ===
- Symphonie-passion for organ, Op. 23 (1924)
- Symphonie No. 2 in C minor for organ, Op. 26 (1929)

=== Olle Elgenmark (1936–2016) ===
- Organ Symphony No. 1, E♭ major, A Carillon Symphony, Op. 19 (1971–1972)
- Organ Symphony No. 2, D minor, Sinfonia breve, Op. 26 (1973–1975)
- Organ Symphony No. 3, E minor, Symphonie Élégiaque, Op. 35 (1973–1990)
- Organ Symphony No. 4, A major, A Festival Symphony, Op. 38 (1990–1992)
- Organ Symphony No. 5, G minor, Retrospection, Op. 40 (1977–2002)
- Organ Symphony No. 6, C major, Enigma, Op. 41 (1995–2001)
- Organ Symphony No. 7, in B minor (unfinished) one complete mov. is a quadruple fugue

=== André Fleury (1903–1995) ===
- Allegro symphonique (1927)
- Symphonie No. 1 (1938/1943)
- Symphonie No. 2 (1946/1947)

=== Jean-Louis Florentz (1947–2004) ===
- La Croix du Sud, poème symphonique for organ, Op. 15 (1999)
- L’Enfant noir, conte symphonique for grand-organ in 14 figures, Op. 17 (2002)

=== César Franck (1822–1890) ===
- Grande Pièce Symphonique, Op. 17 (1863)

=== Marc Giacone (1954–) ===
- Symphonie Cosmique (Cosmic Symphony) for organ (1981)
- Poème symphonique (2001)
- Fresque Symphonique "Ombres et Lumières" for organ (2004)
- Six Symphonic Variations for organ (2006)

=== Jean Guillou (1930-2019) ===
- Sinfonietta for organ, Op. 4
- Symphonie Initiatique for 3 organs, Op. 18 (1971)
- Symphonie Initiatique for 4 hands (the same as above, transcribed for four hands), Op. 18 (1990)

=== Georges Jacob (1877–1950) ===
- Symphonie in E major for organ (1906)

=== Sigfrid Karg-Elert (1877–1933) ===
- Symphony in F♯ minor for organ, Op. 143

=== Daniel Knaggs (1983–) ===
- Iter Animæ, Organ Symphony in 4 movements (2013)

=== Jean Langlais (1907–1991) ===
- Symphonie No. 1 for organ (1941)
- Symphonie No. 2 for organ (1976)
- Symphonie No. 3 for organ (1979)

=== Lazare-Auguste Maquaire (1872–1906) ===
- First Organ Symphony, Op. 20 (1905)

=== Frederik Magle (1977–) ===
- Symphony for organ No. 1 (1990)
- Symphony for organ No. 2 "Let there be light" (1993)

=== Allan J. Ontko (1947–) ===
- First Symphonie, Op.18, 5 movements (1993)
- Second Symphonie, Op. 31, 4 movements (2001)

=== Pierre Pincemaille (1956-2018) ===
- Numerous improvised symphonies recorded, in particular:
  - Symphonie-improvisation (Allegro, Scherzo, Adagio and Final) in: Cannes : un Festival d'improvisations (Ctésibios CTE 065)
  - Improvised symphony in: Improvisations - Livre d'orgue, Symphonie, Variations sur Tantum Ergo (Pierre Verany PV 790111)

=== Charles Quef (1873–1931) ===
- Pièce symphonique, Op. 11

=== Léonce de Saint-Martin (1886–1954) ===
- Symphonie Dominicale
- Symphonie Mariale

=== Kaikhosru Sorabji (1892–1988) ===
- Symphony No. 1 for Organ (1924)
- Second Symphony for Organ (1929–32)
- Third Organ Symphony (1949–53)

=== Leo Sowerby (1895–1968) ===
- Symphony in G (1930)
- Sinfonia Brevis (1965)

=== Fernand de La Tombelle (1854–1928) ===
- Symphonie pascale for organ (Entrée épiscopale – Offertoire – Sortie)

=== Charles Tournemire (1870–1939) ===
- Pièce symphonique, Op. 16 (1899)
- Fantaisie symphonique for organ, Op. 64 (1934)
- Symphonie-choral d'orgue in 6 parts, Op. 69 (1935)
- Symphonie sacrée for organ en 4 parts, Op. 71 (1936)
- Two fresques symphoniques sacrées, Opp. 75, 76 (1939)

=== Louis Vierne (1870–1937) ===
- Organ Symphony No. 1, Op. 14 (1895)
- Organ Symphony No. 2, Op. 20 (1901–1903)
- Organ Symphony No. 3, Op. 28 (1911)
- Organ Symphony No. 4, Op. 32 (1914)
- Organ Symphony No. 5, Op. 47 (1923–1924)
- Organ Symphony No. 6, Op. 59 (1930)

=== Wilhelm Valentin Volckmar (1812–1887) ===
- Symphony on Themes of Herzog Ernst von Sachsen-Coburg-Gotha in D major, for organ, Op. 172 (1867) – the first organ solo symphony, and one of very few German organ symphonies

=== Charles-Marie Widor (1844–1937) ===
- Symphonie No. 1 for organ in C minor, Op. 13
- Symphonie No. 2 for organ in D major, Op. 13
- Symphonie No. 3 for organ in E minor, Op. 13
- Symphonie No. 4 for organ in F minor, Op. 13
- Symphonie No. 5 for organ in F minor, Op. 42/1
- Symphonie No. 6 for organ in G minor, Op. 42/2
- Symphonie No. 7 for organ in A minor, Op. 42
- Symphonie No. 8 for organ in B major, Op. 42
- Symphonie No. 9 for organ, Op. 70 «Gothique»
- Symphonie No. 10 for organ, Op. 73 «Romane»

=== Malcolm Williamson (1931–2003) ===
- Symphony for Organ (1960)

== Symphonies for organ and orchestra ==
=== Kalevi Aho (1949–) ===
- Symphony No. 8 for Organ and Orchestra (1993)

=== Elfrida Andrée (1841–1929) ===
- Organ Symphony No. 2 in E♭ major for organ and brass (1892)

=== Aaron Copland (1900–1990) ===
- Symphony for Organ and Orchestra

=== Marcel Dupré (1886–1971) ===
- Symphonie in G minor for organ and orchestra, Op. 25 (1928)

=== François-Joseph Fétis (1784–1871) ===
- Symphonic Fantasy for organ and orchestra

=== Louis Glass (1864–1936) ===
- Symphony No. 2, Op. 28 (1899)

=== Alexandre Guilmant (1837–1911) ===
- Symphony No. 1 for organ and orchestra in D minor, Op. 42 (1874)
  - Adapted from Organ Sonata No. 1
- Symphony No. 2 for organ and orchestra in A major, Op. 91
  - Adapted from Organ Sonata No. 8

=== Alun Hoddinott (1929–2008) ===
- Symphony No. 7 for organ and orchestra, Op. 137 (1989)

=== Joseph Jongen (1873–1953) ===
- Symphony Concertante for organ and orchestra.

=== Tālivaldis Ķeniņš (1919–2008) ===
- Symphony No. 8 for Organ & Orchestra "Sinfonia concertata" (1986)

=== Aram Khachaturian (1903–1978) ===
- Symphony No.3 "Symphony–Poem" (1947)

=== Ture Rangström (1884–1947) ===
- Symphony no. 4 in D minor "Invocatio" (1935)

=== Poul Ruders (1949–) ===
- Symphony No. 4 "An Organ Symphony"

=== Camille Saint-Saëns (1835–1921) ===
- Symphony No. 3 with organ

=== Esa-Pekka Salonen (1958–) ===
- Sinfonia concertante for organ and orchestra (2022)

=== Heinrich Schulz-Beuthen (1838–1915) ===
- Symphony No. 5 for Organ and Orchestra, Op. 36 "Reformation Hymn" (1884)

=== Tomáš Svoboda (1939–2022) ===
- Symphony No. 3 for Organ and Orchestra, Op. 43 (1965)

=== Charles Tournemire (1870–1939) ===
- Symphony No. 4, Op. 44 "Pages Symphoniques" (1912)
- Symphony No. 6 for Tenor, Chorus, Organ and Orchestra, Op. 48 (1917–18)

=== Louis Vierne (1870–1937) ===
- Pièce symphonique for organ and orchestra (1926)
  - Adapted from Organ Symphony Nos. 1–3

=== Percy Whitlock (1903–1946) ===
- Symphony in G minor for organ and orchestra (1936–37)

=== Charles-Marie Widor (1844–1937) ===
- Symphonie pour orgue et orchestre, Op. 42 (1882)
  - Adapted from Organ Symphonies #2 (central movement) and #6 (outer movements)
- Symphony No. 3, Op. 69 (1894) – organ and orchestra
- Sinfonia sacra, Op. 81 (1908) – organ and orchestra
- Symphonie antique, Op. 83 (1911) – soloists, chorus, organ and orchestra

== See also ==
- List of organ pieces
- List of organ composers
- Piano symphony
