= Surrexit a mortuis =

Easter hymn by Charles-Marie Widor

- Choral music by Charles-Marie Widor
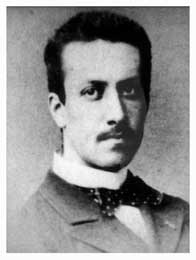
- Widor in 1870
- English: He rose from the dead
- Key: C minor
- Opus: 23/3
- Occasion: Easter
- Composed: 1876
- Published: 1906
- Scoring: choir; two organs

Surrexit a mortuis ('He rose from the dead'), Op. 23, No. 3, is a composition for choir and two organs by Charles-Marie Widor. The text is an anonymous Latin Easter hymn. Named a motet, it was first published by Hamelle in 1906. The single work was published by Dr. J. Butz in 2008.

== History ==
Widor composed Surrexit a mortuis around 1876. He was at the time, since January 1870, "provisional" organist of Saint-Sulpice in Paris, which features a main organ and a choir organ, both built by Aristide Cavaillé-Coll.

The composition was originally conceived, with the title Sacerdos et Pontifex (Bishop and pope), for the installation of a new bishop at the Dijon Cathedral, more specifically for a pontifical procession. It was dedicated to R. Moissenet, the master of the Cathedral's choirs. As the event is rare, Widor saved the music for more frequent use by assigning it to an anonymous Easter hymn in Latin, a text that appears nowhere else, and may have been written by the composer.

Widor scored the music for a four-part choir (SATB) and two organs, following a specifically French tradition of using two organs, an orgue de choeur (choir organ) in the churches' choir, and a grand orgue (grand organ) at the opposite end of the building. At Saint-Sulpice. Widor had a choir at his disposal, formed by the maîtrise of the church and around 200 "baritones" from the seminary.

The work was first published by Hamelle in 1906. In a later edition, it was combined as 3 Motets, Op. 23, the other motets being Psaume 83, a setting of Psalm 84, and Tu es Petrus, both first published in 1904. The single work was published by Dr. J. Butz in 2008 in an arrangement for one organist, also with the alternate text, Sacerdos et Pontifex.

== Text and music ==
Surrexit a mortuis,
Christus Dei Filius,
Pastor bonus,
Pastor qui animam
Pro grege suo posuit.
Pascha nostrum immolatus est Christus.
Surrexit a mortuis.
Alleluia.

He rose from the dead,
Christ, the Son of God,
the good shepherd,
the shepherd who for his flock
laid down his life.
Christ our Passover has been sacrificed for us.
He rose from the dead.
Alleluia.

The organs play a substantial role in the composition, beginning and ending it alone. It is in common time, marked Allegro, and initially as C minor. The key is hidden, though, and the piece ends in C major. The unison men's voices introduce fanfares, the upper voices repeat them. A middle section in A-flat major turns to counterpoint and softer, more melodious singing, before a recapitulation of the first motifs that leads to increasing dynamics and more animated fanfares.

== Recordings ==
The composition was recorded in 1996 by the Westminster Cathedral Choir conducted by James O'Donnell in a collection of masses and motets by Widor, Vierne and Dupré. It was recorded in 2015 by Les Petits Chanteurs du Mont-Royal at Mount Royal, Montreal, with organists Vincent Boucher and Jonathan Oldengarm, and conducted by Gilbert Patenaude, in a collection of choral works by Widor and Louis Vierne.
