= Symphonie gothique =

- Symphony for Organ No. 9
- by Charles-Marie Widor
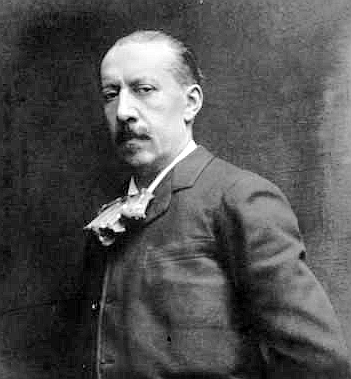
- Widor, c. 1900
- Key: C minor
- Opus: 70
- Year: 1894–95
- Published: 1895 – Mainz
- Publisher: B. Schott's Söhne
- Duration: 30 minutes approx.
- Movements: 4
- Scoring: Solo organ

Premiere
- Date: April 25, 1895
- Location: Saint-Ouen, Rouen
- Performers: Charles-Marie Widor

Symphonie gothique, also unofficially known as Symphony for Organ No. 9 in C minor, Op. 70, is an organ symphony written by French organist and composer Charles-Marie Widor between 1894 and 1895.

== Background ==
Widor wrote his Symphonie Gothique in 1894 and 1895 as one of the two later organ symphonies that followed his original eight organ symphonies. These symphonies were divided into two large groups: the first one comprising symphonies 1 to 4 (in C minor, D major, E minor, and F minor) and the second one comprising symphonies 5 to 8 (F minor, G minor, A minor, and B major). Although the key sequence of the earlier symphonies continued (this one being in C minor), Widor did not number it as "Ninth" out of deference to Beethoven's Ninth Symphony. Instead, he named it after the architectural style of the church associated with the instrument for which it was written: the abbey church of Saint-Ouen, in Rouen, where Cavaillé-Coll had built one of his major late organs and which Widor inaugurated in 1890. Ironically, certain technical features of the instrument prevent the work from being performed exactly as written on that organ.

The first three movements of the symphony were written in Persanges in Jura in the summer of 1894. A preliminary version of this symphony was premiered in the early months of 1895 by Louis Vierne at the Église d'Écully, in Lyon. This performance was played from Widor's manuscript and only featured the first three movements of the symphony. The formal premiere was given by the composer himself at Saint-Ouen on April 28, 1895. It was published later that year, in 1895, by B. Schott's Söhne. Widor himself also recorded parts of this piece on April 29, 1932, in Paris, for Gramophone Company, which eventually became EMI Classics. The parts recorded by Widor include the first and second movements and the toccata segment from the last movement.

== Structure ==
This organ symphony has an approximate duration of 30 minutes. Widor reduced the number of movements to the conventional four, although the first movement does not resemble the traditional sonata-form opening. The list of movements is as follows:

1. Moderato
2. Andante sostenuto
3. Allegro
4. Moderato – Allegro – Moderato – Andante – Allegro (Toccata)

The first movement does not follow the symphonic or sonata-form that is typical in symphonies. Instead, its structure is determined by the dynamic capabilities of the organ. The movement gradually builds over an extended sequence of steady eighth notes, moving through successive dynamic levels to a full-organ climax before returning to a quiet conclusion. Its harmonic language is highly chromatic and dissonant for its date of composition. The second movement is a lyrical piece that has been frequently performed. In its opening section, both melody and accompaniment are played on the harmonic flute stop, a Cavaillé-Coll invention noted for its distinctive registers. The third movement introduces plainchant, as previously described in the source text. Its 6/8 fugue may function structurally as the scherzo of the symphony.

The fourth and final movement, however, is the longest in the symphony. It follows the form of theme and variations. The theme is built upon Puer natus est nobis, a Gregorian chant traditionally sung at the mass on Christmas Day. After that, five variations ensue, with additional themes superimposed over the main theme. A final segment, which is often nicknamed "Toccata" in some recordings, closes the piece.
