= Symphony for Organ No. 6 =

Organ symphony by Charles-Marie Widor

Symphonie VI
- Organ symphony by Charles-Marie Widor
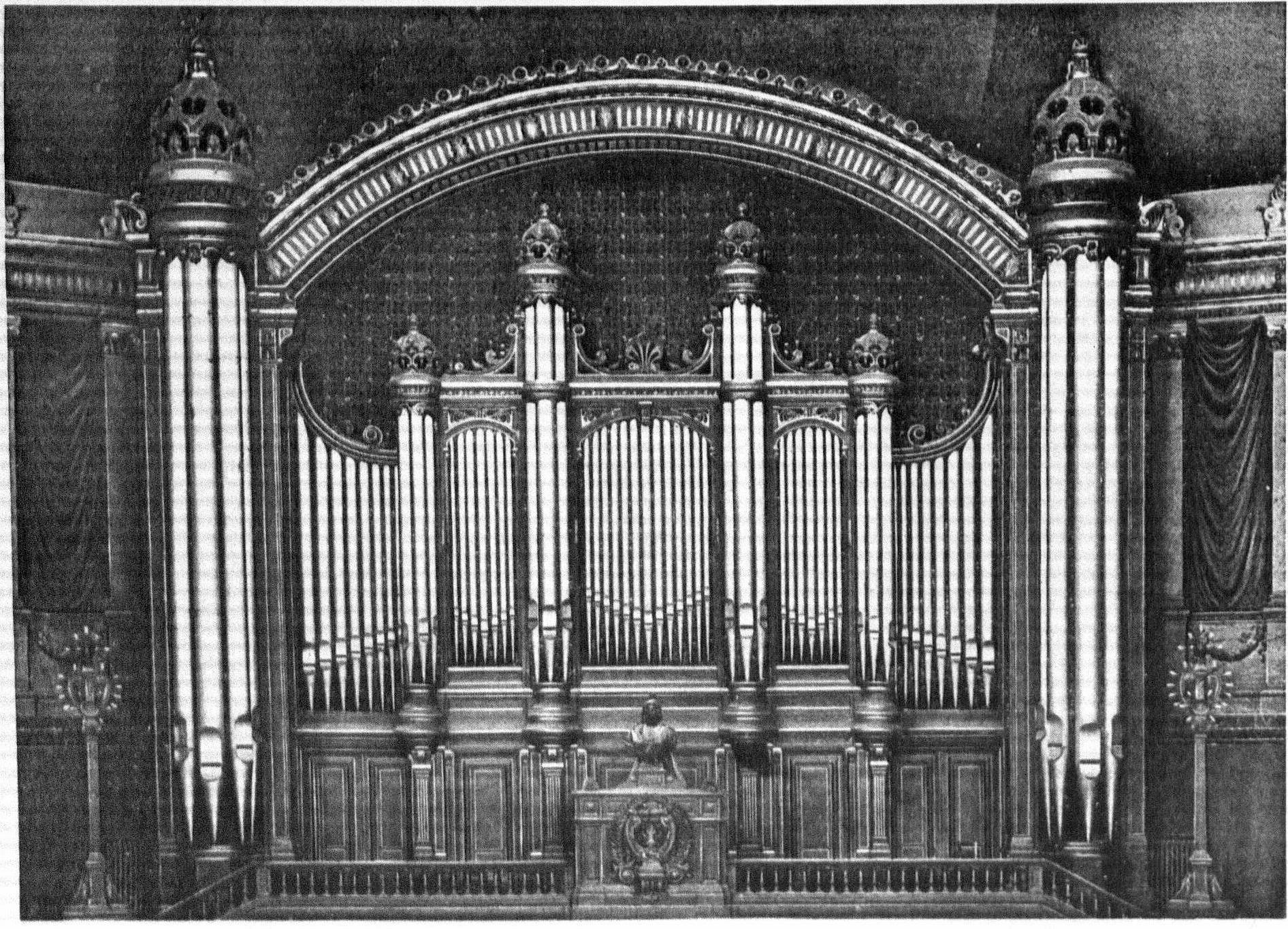
- The Cavaillé-Coll organ at the Palais du Trocadéro, where the composer premiered his work for the inauguration of the instrument at the World Fair 1878
- English: Symphony for Organ No. 6
- Key: G minor
- Opus: 42/2
- Performed: 24 August 1878: Paris
- Movements: five

The Symphony for Organ No. 6 (Symphonie VI pour orgue) in G minor, Op. 42, No. 2, is an organ symphony by Charles-Marie Widor. Completed in 1878, the composer premiered it at the Palais du Trocadéro as part of the Paris World Exhibition. It was first published by Hamelle in 1879, together with the famous Symphony for Organ No. 5.

== History ==
Widor composed the work, one of ten organ symphonies, when he was organist at Saint-Sulpice, a post he held from 1870. The church features a main organ by Aristide Cavaillé-Coll which inspired the composer who wrote "If I had not experienced the seduction of these timbres or the mystical attraction of this wave of sound, I would never have written organ music." Widor's first four symphonies were published by J. Maho in 1872 as his Op. 13. The two following symphonies were published as his Op. 42 in 1879 by Julien Hamelle, Maho's successor. They were reprinted in 1887, now with the revised first four, and the new No. VII and VIII, with a foreword by the composer regarding "the style, the procedures of registration and the signs". Widor often revised his works several times even after publication.

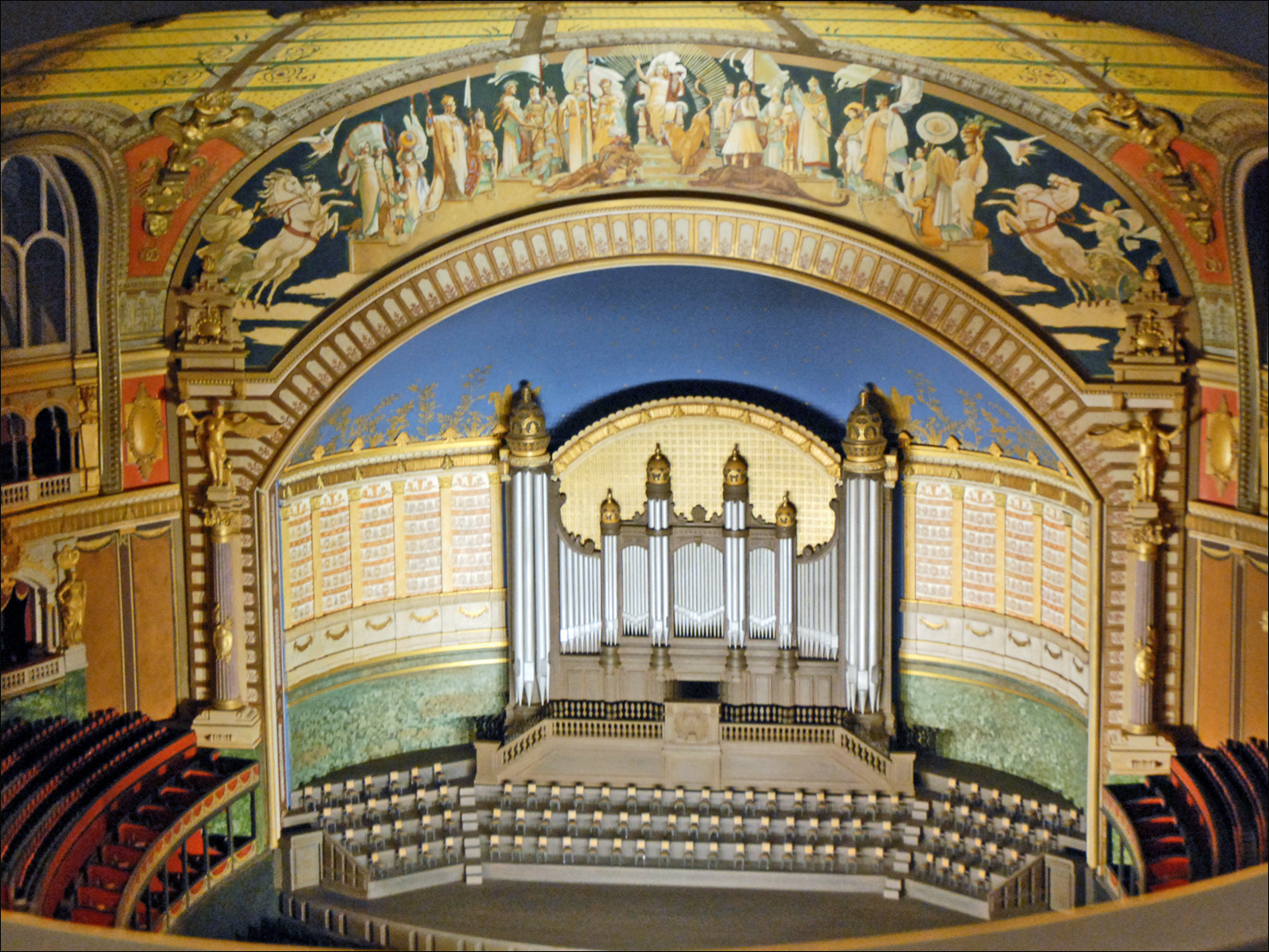
The Salle de spectacle in the Palais du Trocadéro, model

Widor probably composed the Symphonie VI between his return from a visit to Bayreuth in 1876, where he attended the first Bayreuth Festival, presenting the first performance of Wagner's Der Ring des Nibelungen, and the summer of 1878. He premiered it for the inauguration of a Cavaillé-Coll organ at the Palais du Trocadéro in Paris on 24 August 1878 as part of the Paris World Exhibition.

A critical edition of Symponie VI was published by Carus-Verlag in 2015, based predominantly on the last edition during Widor's lifetime, 1929.

== Structure and music ==
The work is structured in five movements:

1. Allegro
2. Adagio
3. Intermezzo
4. Cantabile
5. Finale

Widor's organ symphonies are not as much a structural unit, but extended suites with orchestral sound. He wrote: "The modern organ is thus symphonic in essence. The new instrument demands a new language, an ideal differing from scholastic polyphony."

The first movement introduces a chorale-like theme, and expands in both sonata form and variations. A recitative-episode becomes a second theme. The second movement, in three sections, present "sensual chromaticism", with a registration of "Gambes et Voix célestes". According to Albert Schweitzer, it was inspired by Wagner's music heard in Bayreuth. The third movement serves as a scherzo. Three voices receive a specific sound by the registration "Anches et cornets de 4 et de 8", like the grand jeu of the classical French organ school. The fourth movement has a lengthy theme, of which several motifs are derived. The fifth movement is a sonata-rondo, culminating in a "tumultuous coda".

== Orchestral version ==
In 1882, Widor composed a version for organ and orchestra, Symphonie pour orgue et orchestre, op. 42(bis). This piece is in three movements, the first and third of which are taken from the Symphonie VI for solo organ. Widor saw the orchestral potential of his sixth symphony for solo organ and after an invitation from the Prince of Wales, future King Edward VII to play on the Royal Albert Hall Organ, he decided to carry it out. The two met during rehearsals for Widor's own ballet “La Korrigane” in 1880, and the still prince at that moment was amazed by him. For that invitation Widor decided to orchestrate part of his Symphonie VI and one movement of his Symphonie II. This is how he relates it in his "Souvenirs autobiographiques" .

At that lime [the rehearsals of Widor's ballet, La Korrignane, in fall 1880], the future Edward VII, prince of Wales, was spending the autumn in Paris and coming every evening to the Opera. I [still] see myself, daily chatting cordially with the future majesty on the stage of the Opera during the rehearsals. He was filled with intelligence and was interested in everything. Before leaving Paris, he asked me if I would accept to come and play the organ in Royal Albert Hall for the occasion of a festival that he was organizing for the profit of his hospital in London ....

For the occasion of the Albert Hall concert, I orchestrated my Symphony in G minor, with which I played two pieces of Bach.... I stayed a week or so for the rehearsals and dined two or three times at the Duke of Edinburgh's.

The work was premiered at the Trocadéro on Tuesday 13 April 1882 and at the Royal Albert Hall in London a few weeks later, on Saturday 20 May 1882. Widor played the organ part at both premieres and received excellent reviews as a composer and virtuoso. In 1904, Charles-Marie Courboin, a recent graduate of the Brussels Conservatory, performed the symphony with the ''Société royale d'harmonie in Antwerp''. That same year, Courboin, who had been organist at Antwerp Cathedral since 1902, moved to Oswego, New York. Equipped with the only extant copies of the complete score and parts, Courboin gave the American premiere of Widor's symphony at the Wannamaker Department Store in Philadelphia on 27 March 1925 with the Philadelphia Orchestra conducted by Leopold Stokowski, to an estimated audience of 12,000. This performance is credited with awakening new desires for American compositions for organ and orchestra. Despite all the initial success, this symphony received only a handful of performances in the 1920s with the Cleveland Symphony Orchestra in January 1928. After this performance, it was virtually forgotten until the 1990s .

The first movement of the “Symphonie pour orgue et orchestre, op. 42(bis)” is the first movement of the Symphonie VI for solo organ and the organ part is unchanged from the original. Widor uses the expressive dynamic capabilities of the orchestra to complement the qualities of the organ . Widor decided not to orchestrate any of the three central movements of his Symphonie VI. Instead of them, the second movement of the Symphonie pour orgue et orchestre, op. 42(bis) is based on the central movement of Widor's Symphonie II for solo organ, composed in 1872. For the organ and orchestra version, Widor arranged this movement for organ and strings. This combination was a success, as the organ can function not only from its own language and sound morphology, but also as a large wind section of the orchestra. This Adagio in Bb Major offers an effective dynamic and textural contrast to the other two sections. Unfortunately, there is no evidence as to why he chose to orchestrate this movement, we can only speculate as to why Widor chose to rework the third movement of the Symphonie II for solo organ rather than the second movement of the Symphonie VI, also an Adagio, but in this case in B major. The last movement is the victorious Vivace in G major from his Symphonie VI and as in the first movement the dynamic resources of the orchestra are combined with the organ, although in this case the organ part did undergo some changes with respect to the original.

== Bibliography ==
- Near, J.R. (2011). Widor: A life beyond the toccata. University of Rochester Press
- Widor, C. (2002). Symphonie pour orgue et orchestre, opus 42[bis]. (John R. Near, Ed.). A-R Editions.
- Ging, M. (2018). Orchestrations and transformations: Guilmant, Widor and the emergence of music for organ and orchestra in France. University of Houston.

== Recordings ==
- Charles-Marie Widor (1844–1937) / Organ Symphony No.5, Op.42, No.1 / Organ Symphony No.6, Op.42, No.2, Colin Walsh, organ of Lincoln Cathedral built by Father Henry Willis in 1898 (2005)
- Charles-Marie Widor (1844–1937) / Organ Symphony No.6, Op.42, No.2 / Organ Symphony No.5, Op.42, No.1, Joseph Nolan, organ of L’église de la Madeleine, Paris, by Cavaillé-Coll (2011)
