= Swell box =

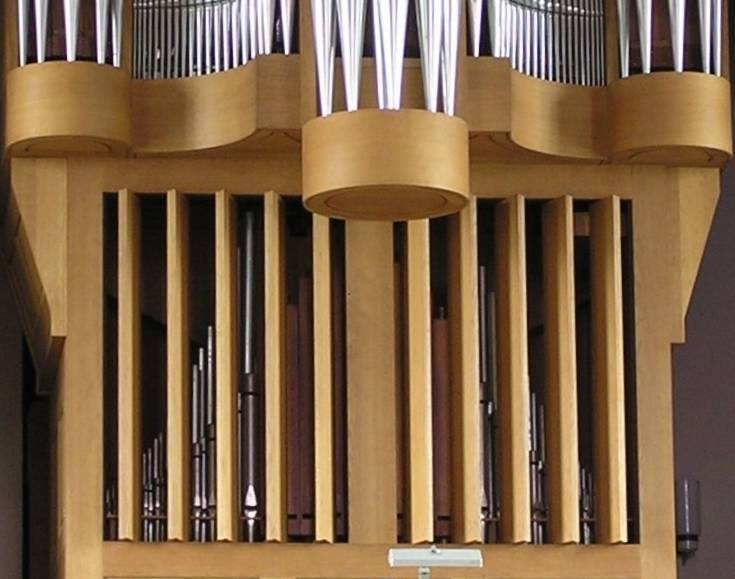
Swell box shutters of a Klais organ in Kleve, Germany

In a pipe organ, a swell box is an enclosure around a group of pipes fitted with movable shutters, or swell shades. By opening or closing the shutters, the organist can vary the amount of sound emerging from the enclosure, producing gradual changes in loudness. The shutters are operated from the organ console by a swell pedal, also called an expression pedal.

The invention of the swell box is credited to the English organ builders Abraham Jordan, father and son, whose organ at St Magnus the Martyr in London was advertised in 1712 as capable of producing "swelling notes". The device was not immediately adopted in other countries, and much earlier organ repertoire, including the music of Johann Sebastian Bach, was written without it in mind. In the 19th century, French organ builder Aristide Cavaillé-Coll refined the English swell mechanism by introducing a spring-loaded pedal, later replaced by a balanced design, to control the shutters.

== History ==
The invention of the swell box has been credited to two organ-builders called Abraham Jordan, a father-and-son team which was active in the early eighteenth century (for example at the church of St Magnus the Martyr, London). It took time to be adopted in other countries and therefore some of the best organ music, for example that of Bach, was not written with a swell box in mind.

The Jordans' work can be seen as a development of earlier technology, but its significance was recognized at the time. The Spectator announced that "Whereas Mr. Abraham Jordan, senior and junior, have, with their own hands, joinery excepted, made and erected a very large organ in St Magnus' Church, at the foot of London Bridge, consisting of four sets of keys, one of which is adapted to the art of emitting sounds by swelling notes, which never was in any organ before; this instrument will be publicly opened on Sunday next [14 February 1712], the performance by Mr. John Robinson. The above-said Abraham Jordan gives notice to all masters and performers, that he will attend every day next week at the said Church, to accommodate all those gentlemen who shall have a curiosity to hear it."

Aristide Cavaillé-Coll refined the English swell box by devising a spring-loaded (later balanced) pedal with which the organist could operate the swell shutters.
