= Marc Dubugnon =

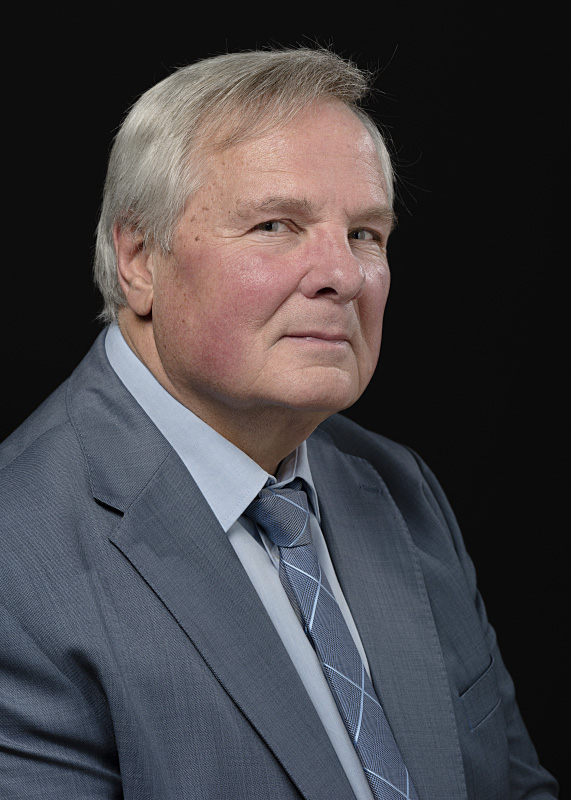
Marc Dubugnon

Marc Dubugnon (born 24 May 1946) is a musician, organist and teacher of the Canton de Vaud.

== Sources ==
- Dubugnon, Marc, Sept toccatas et deux chorals, Aethon, 1988, cote BCUL: DCR 9564
- Dubugnon, Marc, Vierne, Louis, Symphonies pour orgue 3 et 4, Aethon, 2003, cote BCUL: DCR 6980
- Delessert, Raphaël, "Après trente-deux ans, l'organiste range ses partitions", 24 Heures, 2008/02/09, p. 22
- Dubois, B., "Le titulaire a l'orgue qui le démange", 24 Heures, 2008/05/23, p. 27
- Charpilloz, "Un deuxième orgue pour l'église Saint-Martin", 24 Heures, 2006/12/09, p. 24
- Grabet, "Derib en vadrouille sur la piste de ses années d'enfance valaisannes", 24 Heures, 2008/09/13, p. 40.
