= Symphony for Organ and Orchestra (Copland) =

Symphony for Organ and Orchestra written by American composer Aaron Copland

Aaron Copland wrote the Symphony for Organ and Orchestra in 1924. It represents a major work in the composer's oeuvre, as it was his first fully realized orchestral work, his first work for organ, and the first piece whose orchestration he heard. It was premiered on January 11, 1925, in New York. In 1928, Copland re-orchestrated the work without organ as his Symphony No. 1, rewriting the organ part in the brass and adding saxophone.

== History ==
Copland studied composition in Paris from 1921 to 1924 under famed pedagogue Nadia Boulanger. He was especially appreciative of the confidence she displayed in her young American students, and she arranged for him to write a major symphonic work for organ and orchestra to be premiered by herself on organ and the New York Symphony Orchestra under Walter Damrosch followed by the Boston Symphony Orchestra (BSO) under Serge Koussevitzky. He had come to be known around Paris as "that talented young American composer," and at a meeting at Koussevitzky's house with Sergei Prokofiev and Boulanger, the conductor remarked "You vill [sic] write an organ concerto, Mademoiselle Boulanger vill [sic] play it and I vill [sic] conduct it!" Despite his apprehensiveness about his preparedness to write such a large work — Copland had never heard his own orchestration — Boulanger reassured him that he possessed the skills and talent.

The Symphony for Organ and Orchestra was premiered in New York on January 11, 1925 at Aeolian Hall, also Boulanger's American debut. The Boston premiere took place later that year. The premiere of the re-orchestrated First Symphony did not take place until 1931, when the Berlin Symphony Orchestra performed it under Ernest Ansermet's baton.

== Instrumentation ==
The Symphony for Organ and Orchestra is scored for piccolo, two flutes, two oboes, English horn, two clarinets in B♭, bass clarinet in B♭, two bassoons, contrabassoon, four horns, three trumpets in C, 3 trombones, tuba, timpani, percussion, two harps, celesta, strings, and organ.

The First Symphony (the non-organ version) is scored for piccolo, two flutes, two oboes, English horn, two clarinets in B♭, bass clarinet in B♭, 2 bassoons, contrabassoon, alto saxophone in E♭, eight horns, five trumpets, three trombones, tuba, timpani, percussion, piano, two harps, and strings.

== Form ==
The Organ Symphony contains three movements: a contemplative prelude, a driving scherzo with a "bluesy" trio section, and a moderate tempo finale ranging in character from mournful to unrelenting:

1. Prelude
2. Scherzo
3. Finale

The work is unusual for a "symphony" in that it only contains three movements and the movements increase in length from start to finish. Howard Pollack, a historian of American composers, states that the work is much more like a concerto, and that its progressive elongation of movements makes the last in particular seem to drag on in spots, but that "such flaws are more than compensated from by the music's vitality, brilliance, and individuality." Pollack further notes:

The prelude, more wistful than sad, features that bittersweet, pastoral mood so characteristic of its composer. The scherzo reveals an equally familiar hallmark in its evocation of modern urban life—here propulsive, mechanical, jazzy, with an ironically robotized quotation of the French tune "Au Claire de la Lune," an homage, surely, to Boulanger... The Finale, alternatively dirgelike and urgent (the composer's prophetic voice already making itself heard), ends triumphantly, as his music often does.

=== I. Prelude ===
The tonal material of the prelude can be found in its first four measures, based on the half-step/whole-step octatonic scale beginning on G♯ (G♯-A-B-C-D-D♯-F-F♯-G♯). The use of octatonic scales features prominently in the symphony and serve as a means of changing between tonal centers. This unites the prelude in a ternary form characteristic of Copland, moving the tonal center by a tritone in the B section.

| Section | Measures | Material | Tonal Center |
|---|---|---|---|
| A | 1-28 | theme 1, ostinato 1, theme 1 inverted | G♯, I-♭V |
| B | 29-61 | theme 2, ostinato 2, theme 1 inverted, theme 1 | D, ♭V |
| A′ | 62-91 | theme 1, ostinato 1, theme 1 inverted | G♯, I |

Throughout the work, Copland employs a three-note motive based on the minor triad. The motive is first heard prominently in the trumpet's first entrance, although it is at the pianissimo dynamic level and muted. Used through all three movements, it appears near the end of the work in triple forte (fortessissimo), unifying the Symphony and lending weight to its conclusion.

=== II. Scherzo ===
The scherzo movement features a polyrhythmic ostinato present through 80% of the movement, based on two 'eighth note, eighth note, eighth rest' figures one eighth-note out of phase. The interlocking rhythms gives a perpetuum mobile feel to the movement, whose thematic material derives from it as well. Copland stated that the bluesy rhythms found in the scherzo's trio section would not have been there had he not been raised in Brooklyn.

=== III. Finale ===
The finale is cast in a modified sonata form, possibly because it was originally intended to open the symphony. Copland described the sonata form as comprising a first theme in the violas based on the minor triad motive, a second theme in the strings over a bass line ostinato based on the motive, a development section initiated by the organ including a "vivacious" theme for solo violin, and a short recapitulation that combines these main elements. Pollack contends that sonata form is difficult to grasp in this movement, even for an experienced listener, and likens it to a passacaglia, with "its open unison theme, its contrapuntal exposition, its repetitive bass lines, its lack of clear thematic contrast, and, perhaps above all, its tonal stasis."

== Legacy ==
The Symphony for Organ and Orchestra established Copland as a serious modern composer. Musicologist Gayle Murchison posits that his use of the octatonic and whole-tone scales, polyrhythmic ostinato figures, and dissonant counterpoint proves his mastery of the modernist harmonic, rhythmic, and melodic techniques of the 1920s. The work shows much influence of Copland's hero Igor Stravinsky such as its nervous, driving rhythms and some of its harmonic language, but it also draws significantly and consciously from jazz - Copland's birthright - as in its playful interpretation of triple meter in the scherzo movement. For a decade Copland would continue to draw from jazz in his quest to evoke an essentially "American" sound. His interaction with Maestro Koussevitzky would lead to the latter to conduct 12 of Copland's orchestra pieces as head of the BSO, including several he commissioned and premiered.

The audience at the New York premiere was taken aback by its "radical departure from common practice conventions." From the stage, Maestro Damrosch famously remarked, "if a gifted young man can write a symphony like that at age twenty-three, within five years he will be ready to commit murder," which was in Copland's words a joke meant to "smooth the ruffled feathers of his conservative Sunday afternoon ladies faced with modern music." Just as contemporary critics rejected Copland's work for being too jazzy and too modern, receptive conductors and audiences were excited to hear his developing style. Copland himself came to see the work as too "European" and consciously sought to evoke an American idiom in his future work before eventually accepting it as a reflection of his natural idiom.

== Recordings ==
- Aaron Copland, Symphony for Organ and Orchestra - Organ: Pierre Pincemaille - Direction: Daniel Tosi - Perpignan Cathedral - Solstice SOCD 198.
- Aaron Copland, Symphony for Organ and Orchestra - Organ: E. Power Biggs - Direction: Leonard Bernstein - Sony Classical SMK 63155.
