= Charles-Marie Widor =

French organist and composer (1844–1937)

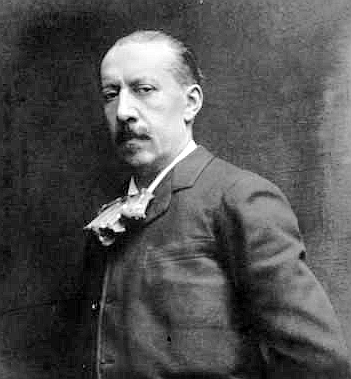
- Widor, c. 1900
- Born: Charles-Marie-Jean-Albert Widor; 21 February 1844; Lyon, France
- Died: 12 March 1937 (aged 93); Paris, France
- Occupations: Composer; organist

Charles-Marie-Jean-Albert Widor (21 February 1844 – 12 March 1937) was a French organist, composer, teacher, conductor and critic of the late Romantic era. As a composer he is best known for his ten symphonies for solo organ, a genre he invented. He was helped in this by the innovative organs built by Aristide Cavaillé-Coll. The final Toccata of his Organ Symphony No. 5 is frequently played as recessional music at weddings and other celebrations.

He was the longest-serving organist of Saint-Sulpice in Paris, a post he held for 63 years (January 1870 – 31 December 1933). He also was organ professor at the Paris Conservatoire from 1890 to 1896 in succession to César Franck and then he became professor of composition at the same institution, following Théodore Dubois.

Widor was a prolific composer, writing music for organ, piano, voice and ensembles. Apart from his ten organ symphonies, he also wrote three symphonies for orchestra and organ, nearly a hundred songs for piano and voice, four operas and a ballet.

== Life and career ==
=== Early years ===
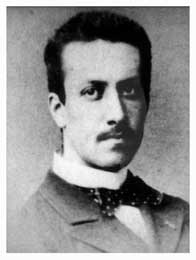
Widor c. 1870

Widor was born in Lyon on 21 February 1844. (Note: Several sources give Widor's year of birth as 1845, he himself thought it was the correct date, and it is inscribed on his tomb, but his birth certificate survives and shows the earlier year.) His parents were François Charles Widor and his wife François Elisabeth née Peiron. François, a successful organ builder and a well-known organist, took charge of his son's musical education. The boy showed considerable musical ability and at the age of eleven became the organist at the lycée in Lyon.

Aristide Cavaillé-Coll, reviver of the art of organ building in France, was a friend of the Widor family; on his recommendation the young Widor went to Brussels in 1863, studying with Jacques-Nicolas Lemmens for organ technique and with François-Joseph Fétis, director of the Brussels Conservatoire, for composition. Lemmens had an unbroken musical line of descent across four generations from J. S. Bach; (Note: Bach's pupil Johann Christian Kittel taught Johann Christian Heinrich Rinck, whose pupil Adolf Friedrich Hesse taught Lemmens.) Lemmens's biographer François Sabatier comments, "The idea that Lemmens inherited the 'Holy tradition' of Bach ... and passed it on directly to his successors (Guilmant, Widor, Loret, and then Dupré) should be regarded with caution", but from Lemmens, Widor learned traditional German interpretations of Bach to which he remained loyal for the rest of his life.

=== Paris: Madeleine and Saint-Sulpice ===
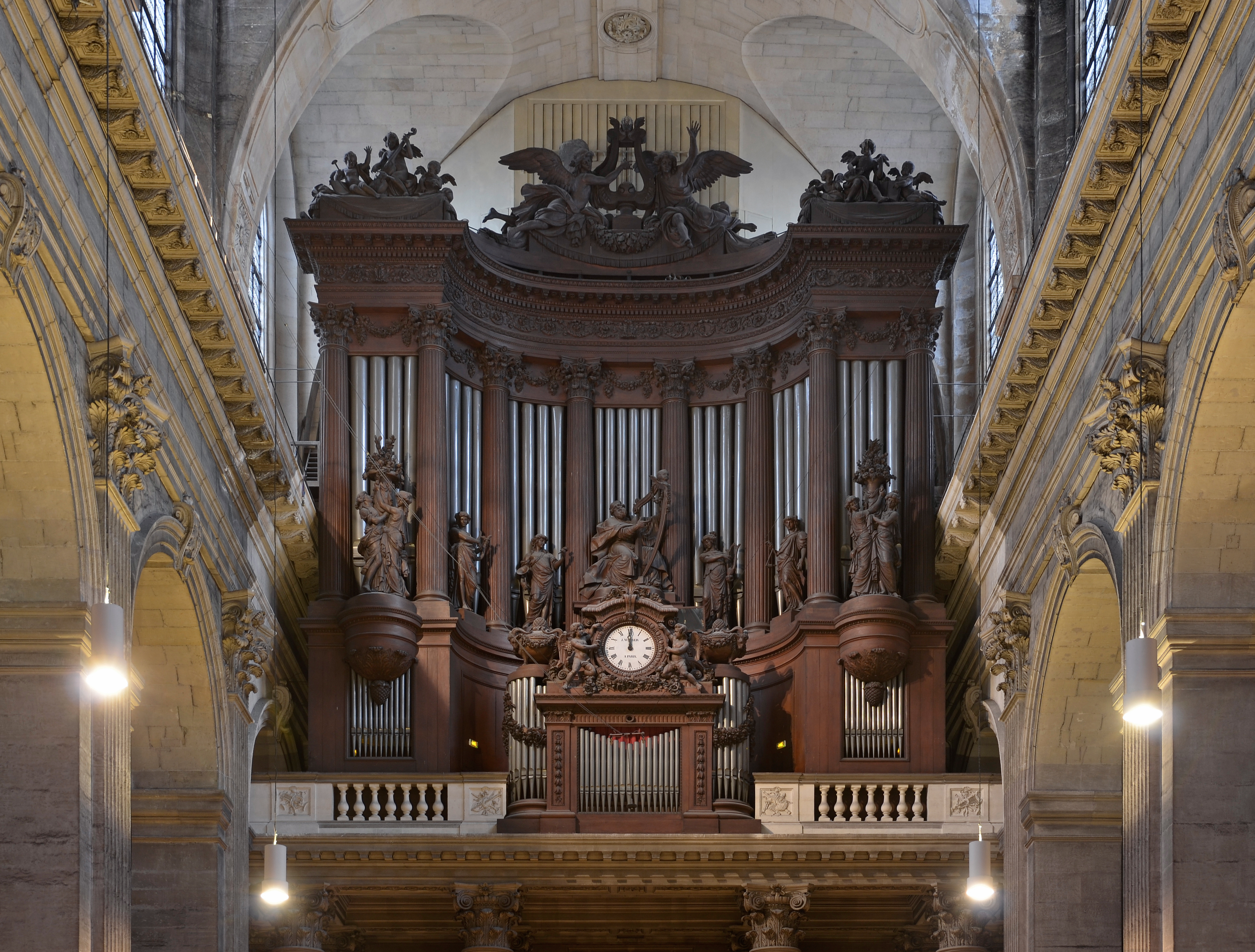
The Cavaillé-Coll organ at Saint-Sulpice

After four years of study in Brussels, Widor moved to Paris where he resided for the rest of his life. In 1869, at the age of 24, he was appointed assistant to Camille Saint-Saëns, organist at the Église de la Madeleine. The organist of Saint-Sulpice in Paris, Alfred Lefébure-Wély, died on the last day of 1869. In January 1870, with the combined lobbying of Cavaillé-Coll and Charles Gounod, Widor was appointed as organist of Saint-Sulpice for a provisional term of one year. Despite the ostensibly provisional nature of his appointment, Widor remained at Saint-Sulpice for nearly 64 years, until the end of 1933.

During the German siege of Paris from September 1870 to January 1871 services continued despite bombardment. Widor was conscripted into the French army but was released each Sunday to play – in military uniform – at Saint-Sulpice. The church continued to survive, with minor damage, during the turmoil of the Paris Commune in March to May 1871.

In October 1871 Gabriel Fauré was appointed as organiste du choeur – Widor's deputy and choirmaster. During some services, Widor and Fauré improvised simultaneously at the church's two organs, trying to catch each other out with sudden changes of key. In January 1874 Fauré left to become deputy to Saint-Saëns at the Madeleine (like Widor before him). He was succeeded at Saint-Sulpice by his friend and former student André Messager, who continued the friendly improvising contests with Widor. Improvisation of a more serious character added to Widor's reputation. According to the newspaper Excelsior, his improvisations were "inspired by the evocation of the holy mysteries, starting from an angelic sweetness, to end with a dazzling sound, immense as the sacred precinct with which they filled the vaults".

Widor had a strong sense of self-sufficiency, and recoiled from belonging to a group. For that reason he was not among the founder-members of the Société Nationale de Musique, formed in 1871 under the joint chairmanship of Romain Bussine and Saint-Saëns, to promote new French music. Members included Fauré, Georges Bizet, Emmanuel Chabrier, Vincent d'Indy, Henri Duparc, César Franck, Édouard Lalo and Jules Massenet, but Widor never joined.

Liszt and Wagner – musical heroes to Widor

The dominant musical influence of the later part of the nineteenth century was Richard Wagner, and like many other French composers Widor made the journey to the Bayreuth Festival, where he attended the first complete performance of Der Ring des Nibelungen. He regarded Die Meistersinger as Wagner's masterpiece, and Wagner's influence is heard in Widor's Organ Symphonies Numbers One and Six, in particular. The musical analyst Ateş Orga cites Wagner and Franz Liszt as Widor's musical heroes. Widor's respect for Wagner's orchestration was such that he included numerous references to and examples from Wagner operas in his textbook, Technique de l'orchestre moderne (Technique of the Modern Orchestra).

Many French composers supplemented their income by writing music criticism, (Note: Among those who did so were Hector Berlioz, Saint-Saens, Fauré, Messager, Paul Dukas, Claude Debussy, and Reynaldo Hahn.) and from about 1880 Widor did so under the pen-name Auteles in the daily L'Estafette. During the 1880s he took to conducting. In emulation of the British choral tradition he co-founded the Societé Concordia, with whom he directed works for choir and orchestra including The Seasons, the St Matthew Passion and others by Saint-Saëns, Liszt, Schumann and Mendelssohn. His friend and admirer Isidor Philipp wrote:

This supervirtuoso of the organ, this inspired improviser, was, like Debussy and Ravel, a mediocre, uncertain, timid orchestra conductor, yet he liked to conduct, as if he, of all people, was in search of applause.

=== Paris Conservatoire ===
In 1890, after the death of Franck, Widor succeeded him as organ professor at the Paris Conservatoire. At first he found it difficult to introduce his own methods, which aroused much envy and obstruction, as some colleagues dismissed him as an outsider. He thought Franck had lacked musical rigour, but taking care not to alienate the students, who had revered Franck, he told them that although his predecessor had been a brilliant improviser, the focus now must be on developing a technique that was "scientific and rational, not empirical". According to Grove's Dictionary of Music and Musicians he overcame his early problems at the conservatoire by force of character and successfully introduced a rigorous technical discipline in addition to a supposedly authentic style of performing Bach. One of his students later recalled:

Apart from actual inaccuracy, the fault Widor could least endure was lack of rhythm. In the class his continual comments were: He plays like a glue-pot! Lift the hands from the keys. Observe the rests, the commas, and the "breath-marks". Phrase more! Articulate more! He used to say: "Many musicians and artists think the organ is a dull and unattractive instrument; but it is the organists themselves who are to blame for this by their lifeless, unrhythmic performances".

Among Widor's students, from top left: Marcel Dupré, Darius Milhaud, Arthur Honegger, Edgard Varèse

In 1896 Théodore Dubois was promoted from professor of composition to be principal of the conservatoire. This incensed Jules Massenet, the other professor of composition, who resigned from the faculty. Widor was appointed to succeed Dubois, and Fauré was appointed to the professorship vacated by Massenet. The two new composition professors found themselves to be rivals. Grove's Dictionary describes Fauré as better suited than Widor to the contemporary cultural climate of Symbolist art and poetry, attracting many important students. (Note: Fauré taught many young composers, including Maurice Ravel, Florent Schmitt, Charles Koechlin, Louis Aubert, Jean Roger-Ducasse, George Enescu, Paul Ladmirault, Alfredo Casella and Nadia Boulanger.) As against that, Widor's expertise in counterpoint, fugue and orchestration, as well as his deep knowledge of the Austro-German tradition, proved of great value to his students such as Arthur Honegger, Edgard Varèse, Darius Milhaud and Marcel Dupré. Among his other students were Gabriel Dupont, Charles Tournemire and Louis Vierne. Albert Schweitzer also studied with Widor, mainly from 1899; master and pupil later collaborated on an annotated edition of J. S. Bach's organ works, published in 1912–1914.

Widor played in Britain and countries in Continental Europe, and he participated in the inaugural concerts of many of Cavaillé-Coll's greatest instruments including that in Notre-Dame de Paris. At the Trocadéro in Paris he gave a regular series of organ concerts with orchestra, in collaboration with the conductor Édouard Colonne.

In 1892 Widor was made a Chevalier of the Légion d'honneur, and reached the rank of a Grand-Officier in 1933. He was elected to the Institut de France in 1910, after being narrowly beaten at his first attempt, the previous year, by the rival candidacy of his former deputy, Fauré. He became Secrétaire perpetuel (permanent secretary) of the Académie des Beaux-Arts in 1914 by the unanimous vote of his colleagues.

=== Later years ===
Widor in 1926

With the outbreak of the First World War in 1914, the French government left Paris for Bordeaux. Widor, who said he trembled for the Louvre, was tasked with arranging the removal of hundreds of the country's finest art treasures to a safer location in Toulouse. After the war the government sent him to Spain to promote cultural exchange between the two nations, a mission resulting in the construction of the arts centre Casa de Velázquez (which was bombed to destruction during the Spanish Civil War but was revived and continues to the present day). In 1921 Widor played a leading role in the foundation of the American Conservatory at Fontainebleau. He was the director until 1934, when he was succeeded by Ravel. His close friend Philipp gave piano lessons there, and Nadia Boulanger taught an entire generation of new composers.

At the age of 76, Widor, described by the musicologist Nigel Simeone as hitherto "a raffish bachelor with a well-honed eye for attractive women", married Mathilde de Montesquiou-Fézensac on 26 April 1920 at Charchigné. The 36-year-old Mathilde was a member of one of the oldest and most prominent families of Europe. (Note: By some accounts Mathilde would have liked to marry Marcel Proust, but Proust being gay she settled for the undoubtedly heterosexual Widor.) The marriage brought him great joy and companionship. He seldom smiled for photographs but does so in those with his wife.

On 31 December 1933, at the age of 89, Widor retired from his position at Saint-Sulpice, succeeded by his former pupil Dupré. In April 1934, at the Saint-Sulpice organ, he played his Pièce mystique, composed when he was 90. Two years later he suffered a stroke that paralysed the right side of his body, although he remained mentally alert to the last. He died at his home in Paris on 12 March 1937 at the age of 93. He had declined a state funeral and his remains were interred in the crypt of Saint-Sulpice four days later.

== Music ==
=== Organ symphonies ===
Opening of Toccata from Organ Symphony No. 5

The musicologist Roland de Candé writes that Widor exercised a profound influence on the French school of organ playing. In the view of Grove's Dictionary, the ten organ symphonies are the core of Widor's large and varied oeuvre. His colleague Isidore Philipp wrote that Widor invented the genre. By Widor's time the term "symphony", which derives from the Greek syn ('together') and phōnē ('sounding'), was taken to mean an extended work for orchestra, generally in four movements and following sonata form. Widor, taking advantage of the wide range of musical timbres offered by Cavaillé-Coll organs, composed solo symphonies on a comparable scale. From his experience in composing for orchestra he was fully aware of the essential differences between organ and orchestra, and cautioned against viewing the former as a substitute for the latter. (Note: Nevertheless, in the preface to later editions of his symphonies, Widor wrote that before Cavaillé-Coll, organs were monochrome in tone, but on the new instruments there was "the possibility of detaining a whole division in an acoustic prison opened or closed at will, the freedom to mix timbres, the means of gradually intensifying or reducing them, the independence of rhythms, sureness of attacks, balance of contrasts – in short, a whole blossoming of wondrous colours, a rich palette of the most diverse tones … of a quality and variety unknown till then. Such is the modern organ, essentially symphonic".) Widor's biographer Andrew Thompson cites Charles Alkan's symphonies for solo piano (1857) and Franck's Grande pièce symphonique (1863) as Widor's starting-point for composing organ symphonies.

In Thompson's view, the first set of Organ Symphonies (Nos. 1–4, 1872), which deploys an eclectic range of styles, seems more like a series of suites than like symphonies. Baker's Biographical Dictionary of Musicians describes the four purely as suites. Thompson finds that the second set (Nos. 5–8, 1887) "contrastingly displays Widor's intellectual force and imaginative power [producing] a high level of argumentative cogency and formal unity within astonishingly large-scale structures". The Fifth Symphony is his best-known and its popular concluding toccata is the music by which he is most remembered. (Note: In 2018 a poll for the British classical music station Classic FM revealed the Toccata to be the most popular piece of music for weddings, beating pieces such as Handel's Arrival of The Queen of Sheba and Mendelssohn's Wedding March from A Midsummer Night's Dream. It has been used as recessional music at many royal weddings including those of Charles III of Britain and of his heir, Prince William, and in Denmark at the weddings of Queen Margrethe and Crown Prince Frederick.) The last two Organ Symphonies are based on traditional Gregorian themes, treated cyclically; No. 9 (the Gothique, 1895) is deliberately archaic in style, and No. 10, the Romane (1900), is more impressionistic. An obituarist wrote:

Widor always remained faithful to the classical style of [Bach], yet he imbued it with his own personal touch. Consequently, works such as the Symphonie gothique and the Symphonie romane – to name but two – do not preclude a certain playfulness and refinement; far from detracting from their power and magnificence, these qualities only serve to enhance them.

In a 1998 study of French organ music, Michael Murray writes of the Symphonies from No. 5 onward "their virtuosity is at the same time precise in the manner of Bach, transcendental in the manner of Liszt – sweeping gesture is at one with minute articulation".

=== Stage works ===
Scene from La Korrigane (1880), Widor's first public success

Widor wrote theatre scores, described by Thompson as "relatively lightweight": ballet music for La Korrigane (1880) and incidental music for Conte d'avril (1885), which became popular in piano and other arrangements. The former was his first public success. The authors of Les Annales du théâtre et de la musique praised "M. Widor's very successful score" and added:

La Korrigane, in introducing the name of this young composer to the theatre, shows us an original musician, an enemy of banality and convention, looking only to himself for his ideas and his inspiration. His style is clear and precise. His melodic phrase always stands out clearly from an instrumentation illuminated by the moon, in the midst of dolmens and menhirs.

Widor's opera Maître Ambros, presented at the Opéra Comique in 1886 attracted some interest for its Wagnerian echoes and "rousing Meyerbeerian crowd scenes" (Grove), but, according to The Era's Paris correspondent, the romantic element was "one of the most commonplace, colourless and uninteresting to which any unfortunate composer has ever had to tack a score", and the reviewer found Widor's score notably elegant and delicate, but colourless. Grove's Dictionary comments on Widor's "apparent tendency to capitalize on the successes of others" – instancing his opera Les pêcheurs de Saint-Jean (1905) which has marked similarities to d'Indy's L'étranger (1898–1901).

=== Songs ===
Widor wished to emulate the musical success of Saint-Saëns and Fauré in smart Parisian salons. The mèlodie (art song) was fashionable, and he composed nearly a hundred – almost as many as Fauré. His song-cycle Soirs d'été (Summer Evenings, 1889) was the first by a French composer since Hector Berlioz's Nuits d'été (Summer Nights, 1841). The words were by Widor's cousin Paul Bourget, who also provided the texts for the composer's second song-cycle, Chansons de mer (Songs of the Sea, 1902). The baritone Michael Bundy describes the cycle as almost symphonic in structure, "balancing ardent yearning, tender pathos and serene relief".

=== Chamber music ===
Widor wrote chamber works throughout his career. They include two piano quintets, a piano quartet, a piano trio, two violin sonatas, a cello sonata and Soirs d'Alsace for piano trio, as well as suites and smaller pieces for various instrumental combinations. A commentator wrote in 1989 of Widor's characteristically French melodic elegance in his chamber works: "There is often an appealing delicacy of texture and colour, though a sense of vigour infuses much of the music, and in the passages of power, there emerges a fullness of sonority that is decidedly romantic".

Among his early chamber works, the Piano Trio in B♭ major, Op. 9, was described in 2007 as a charming, lightweight work, with a romantic first movement with a pleasingly elegant secondary theme and a slow movement reminiscent of a Mendelssohn Song Without Words. The Piano Quintet in D minor, Op. 7, although shorter in length, is described as "a bigger work, more concentrated in conception and style, with the piano dominating the bold opening movement". The slow movement is elegant and there are further Mendelssohnian echoes in the scherzo, followed by a finale in which the polyphonic development may reflect Widor's training in the Bach tradition. Grove's Dictionary describes the Piano Quartet in A minor (1891) as "superb", and says that the work gives a rare insight into Widor's private life, inspired by his love affair with Countess Emmanuela Potocka: "its expression of intimate erotic feeling in the slow movement is enhanced by the piano's Lisztian flutterings and tremblings". The Cello Sonata in A major Op 80 (1907) is a three-movement work on a large scale. Its opening leads to a lively movement in sonata form. A review of a 2003 recording of the piece said "It is full of good ideas and its civilized discourse holds the listener throughout".

== List of compositions ==
Rough dates of composition/publication are in brackets, along with the original publisher, if known.

=== Orchestral works ===
Composition	Year	Publisher	Instruments
Ouverture portugaise	1865	Crescendo Music Publications	organ, wind ensemble and orchestra
Symphony No. 1, Op. 16	1870	Auguste Durand	orchestra
Piano Concerto No. 1, Op. 39	1876	Julien Hamelle	piano and orchestra
Violin Concerto	1877	???	violin and orchestra
Cello Concerto, Op. 41	1882	Julien Hamelle	cello and orchest
Symphonie pour orgue et orchestre, Op. 42	1882	repr. A-R Editions	organ and orchestra (arr. by Widor of movements from Op. 42)
Chant séculaire, Op. 49	1881	Julien Hamelle	soprano solo, chorus and orchestra
Symphony No. 2, Op. 54	1882	Heugel	orchestra
La Nuit de Walpurgis, Op. 60	1887	Julien Hamelle	chorus and orchestra
Fantaisie, Op. 62	1889	Auguste Durand	piano and orchestra
Suite, from Conte d'avril, Op. 64	1892	Heugel	orchestra
Symphony No. 3, Op. 69	1894	Schott	organ and orchestra
Choral et variations, Op. 74	1900	Éditions Alphonse Leduc	harp and orchestra
Piano Concerto No. 2, Op. 77	1906	Heugel	piano and orchestra
Sinfonia sacra, Op. 81	1908	Otto Junne	organ and orchestra
Symphonie antique, Op. 83	1911	Heugel	soloists, chorus, organ and orchestra
Ouverture espagnole	1897	Heugel	orchestra

=== Organ solo ===
Composition	Year	Publisher
Symphonie pour orgue No. 1, Op. 13 No. 1: 1. Prélude; 2. Allegretto; 3. Adagio; 4. Intermezzo; 5. Marche pontificale (revised 1887); 6. Méditation (revised 1887); 7. Final	1872 (revised 1887, 1901 and 1918)	Julien Hamelle
Symphonie pour orgue No. 2, Op. 13 No. 2: 1. præludium circulare 2. Pastorale; 3. Andante; 4. Scherzo (version 1872 La Chasse – revision 1901 Salve Regina); 5. Adagio; 6. Final	1872 (revised 1901)	Julien Hamelle
Symphonie pour orgue No. 3, Op. 13 No. 3: 1. Prélude; 2. Minuetto; 3. Marcia; 4. Adagio; 5. Final (the 1872 version has a Fugue instead of the Final)	1872 (revised 1887, 1901 and 1918)	Julien Hamelle
Symphonie pour orgue No. 4, Op. 13 No. 4: 1. Toccata; 2. Fugue; 3. Andante cantabile 4. Scherzo; 5. Adagio; 6. Final	1872 (revised 1887, 1901 and 1920)	Julien Hamelle
Marche américaine (transc. by Marcel Dupré: No. 11 from 12 Feuillets d'album, Op. 31	???	Julien Hamelle
Symphonie pour orgue No. 5, Op. 42 No. 1: 1. Allegro vivace 2. Allegro cantabile 3. Andantino quasi allegretto 4. Adagio; 5. Toccata	1879 (revised 1901 and 1918)	Julien Hamelle
Symphonie pour orgue No. 6, Op. 42 No. 2: 1. Allegro; 2. Adagio; 3. Intermezzo; 4. Cantabile; 5. Final	1879	Julien Hamelle
Symphonie pour orgue No. 7, Op. 42 No. 3: 1. Moderato; 2. Choral; 3. Andante; 4. Allegro ma non troppo 5. Lento; 6. Final	1887 (revised 1900-1 and 1918)	Julien Hamelle
Symphonie pour orgue No. 8, Op. 42 No. 4: 1. Allegro risoluto 2. Moderato cantabile 3. Allegro; 4. Prélude (later removed); 5. Variations; 6. Adagio; 7. Final	1887	Julien Hamelle
Marche nuptiale, Op. 64 (1892) (transc., from Conte d'avril, Schott)	1892	???
Symphonie gothique pour orgue [No. 9], Op. 70: 1. Moderato; 2. Andante sostenuto 3. Allegro; 4. Moderato (Final)	1895	Schott
Symphonie romane pour orgue [No. 10], Op. 73: 1. Moderato; 2. Choral; 3. Cantilène; 4. Final	1900	Julien Hamelle
Bach's memento	1925	Julien Hamelle
Suite latine, Op. 86	1927	Auguste Durand
Trois Nouvelles pièces, Op. 87	1934	Auguste Durand

=== Chamber work ===
Composition	Year	Publisher	Instruments
6 duos, Op. 3	1867	Regnier-Canaux/Renaud/Pérégally & Parvy/Schott	piano and harmonium
Piano Quintet No. 1, Op. 7	1868	Julien Hamelle	piano
Sérénade, Op. 10	1870	Julien Hamelle	flute, violin, cello, piano and harmonium
Piano Trio, Op. 19	1875	Julien Hamelle	violin, cello, piano
3 Pièces, Op. 21	1875	Julien Hamelle	cello and piano
Suite, Op. 34	1877; 1898	Julien Hamelle (1870) Heugel (1898)	flute and piano
Romance, Op. 46	???	???	violin and piano
Sonate No. 1, Op. 50	1881	Julien Hamelle	violin and piano
Soirs d'Alsace (4 Duos), Op. 52	1881	Julien Hamelle	violin, cello and piano
Cavatine, Op. 57	1887	Julien Hamelle	violin and piano
Piano Quartet, Op. 66	1891	Auguste Durand	piano
Piano Quintet No. 2, Op. 68	1894	Auguste Durand	piano
Introduction et rondo, Op. 72	1898	Éditions Alphonse Leduc	clarinet and piano
Suite, Op. 76	1903	Julien Hamelle	violin and piano
Sonate, Op. 79	1906	Heugel	violin and piano
Sonate, Op. 80	1907	Heugel	cello and piano
Salvum fac populum tuum, Op. 84	1916	Heugel	3 trumpets, 3 trombones, drum and organ
4 Pièces	1890	???	violin, cello and piano
3 Pièces	1891	???	oboe and piano
Suite	1912	???	cello and piano
Suite florentine	1920	???	violin and piano

(Salvum fac populum tuum Op. 84 is also known in English as "Lord, Save Thy People")

=== Piano solo ===
Composition	Year	Publisher
Variations de concert sur un thème original, Op. 1	1867	Heugel
Sérénade, Op. 3 No. 4 (arr. Leistner)	???	Julien Hamelle
Airs de ballet, Op. 4	1868	Julien Hamelle
Scherzo-valse, Op. 5	1868	Julien Hamelle
La Barque (Fantaisie italienne), Op. 6	1877	Auguste Durand
Le Corricolo (Fantaisie italienne), Op. 6	1877	Auguste Durand
Caprice, Op. 9	1868	Julien Hamelle
3 Valses, Op. 11	1871	Julien Hamelle
Impromptu, Op. 12	1871	Julien Hamelle
6 Morceaux de salon, Op. 15	1872	Julien Hamelle
Prélude, andante et final, Op. 17	1874	Julien Hamelle
Scènes de bal, Op. 20	1875	Julien Hamelle
6 Valses caractéristiques, Op. 26	1877	Julien Hamelle
Variations sur un thème original, Op. 29 (revision of op. 1)	1877	Julien Hamelle
12 Feuillets d'album, Op. 31	1877	Julien Hamelle
5 Valses, Op. 33	???	Julien Hamelle
Dans les bois, Op. 44	1880	Julien Hamelle
Pages intimes, Op. 48	1879	Julien Hamelle
Suite polonaise, Op. 51	1881	Julien Hamelle
Suite, Op. 58	1887	Julien Hamelle
Carnaval, 12 pièces, Op. 61	1889	Julien Hamelle
Nocturne, from Contes d'avril, Op. 64	???	???
5 Valses, Op. 71	1894	Julien Hamelle
Suite écossaise, Op. 78	1905	Joseph Williams
Introduction	???	Julien Hamelle
Intermezzo	???	Julien Hamelle

=== Songs and choral works ===
Mass Op. 36, Gloria
Duration is 6:33.

Mass Op. 36, Agnus Dei
Duration is 3:43.

Composition	Year	Publisher	Instruments
O Salutaris, Op. 8	1868	Julien Hamelle	contralto or baritone, violin, cello and organ
6 Mélodies, Op. 14	1872	Julien Hamelle	voice and piano
Tantum ergo, Op. 18 No. 1	1874	Julien Hamelle	baritone, chorus and organ
Regina coeli, Op. 18 No. 2	1874	Julien Hamelle	baritone, chorus and organ
6 Mélodies, Op. 22	1875	Julien Hamelle	voice and piano
Quam dilecta tabernacula tua, Op. 23 No. 1	1876	Julien Hamelle	baritone, chorus and organ
Tu es Petrus, Op. 23 No. 2	1876	Julien Hamelle	baritone, chorus and organ
Surrexit a mortuis (Sacerdos et pontifex), Op. 23 No. 3	1876	Julien Hamelle	chorus and organ
Ave Maria, Op. 24	1877	Julien Hamelle	mezzo, harp and organ
3 Choruses, Op. 25	1876	Julien Hamelle	SATB choir
3 Mélodies, Op. 28	1876	Julien Hamelle	voice and piano
2 Duos, Op. 30	1876	Julien Hamelle	soprano, contralto and piano
3 Mélodies italiennes, Op. 32	1877	Julien Hamelle	voice and piano
3 Mélodies italiennes, Op. 35	1878	Julien Hamelle	voice and piano
Messe, Op. 36	1878	Julien Hamelle	baritone chorus, SATB chorus and two organs
6 Mélodies, Op. 37	1877	Julien Hamelle	voice and piano
2 Duos, Op. 40	1876	Julien Hamelle	soprano, contralto and piano
6 Mélodies, Op. 43	1878	Julien Hamelle	voice and piano
6 Mélodies, Op. 47	1879	Julien Hamelle	voice and piano
6 Mélodies, Op. 53	1881	Julien Hamelle	voice and piano
Ave Maria, Op. 59	1884	Julien Hamelle	voice, harp and organ
O salutaris, Op. 63[bis]	1889	Julien Hamelle	voice, violin, cello and organ
Soirs d'été, Op. 63	1889	Auguste Durand	voice and piano
Ecce Joanna, Alleluia!	???	Schola Cantorum	SATB choir and organ
Psalm 112	1879	Julien Hamelle	baritone, chorus, organ and orchestra
Chansons de mer, Op. 75	1902	???	???
Da pacem	1930	Auguste Durand	SATB choir and organ or piano
Non credo	1930	Auguste Durand	voice and piano

=== Stage music ===
Composition	Year	Publisher	Stage Music Type
Le Capitaine Loys	c. 1878	unpublished	comic opera
La Korrigane	1880	Julien Hamelle	ballet
Maître Ambros, Op. 56	1886	piano reduction published by Heugel	opera
Conte d'avril, Op. 64	1885; 1891	Heugel	incidental music
Les Pêcheurs de Saint-Jean	1895; 1904	Heugel	opera
Nerto	1924	Heugel	opera

== Writings ==
- Technique de l'orchestre moderne faisant suite au Traité d'instrumentation de H. Berlioz (1904, Paris: Lemoine)
- L'Orgue moderne, la décadence dans la facture contemporaine (1928, Paris: Durand)
- Vieilles Chansons pour les Petits Enfants: avec Accompagnements de Ch. M. Widor From the Collections at the Library of Congress

== Recordings ==
- Complete organ works by Ben van Oosten
- The 10 symphonies for organ, by Pierre Pincemaille, on 10 Cavaillé-Coll organs - Solstice SOCD 181-185.
- 3^{rd}, 6^{th} et 10^{th} symphonies for organ, performed by Marc Dubugnon at the Swiss Reformed Church of Saint Martin, in Vevey, the three symphonies on YouTube

Preceded by Louis James Alfred Lefébure-Wély	Titular Organist, Saint Sulpice Paris; 1870–1934	Succeeded by Marcel Dupré

== Notes, references and sources ==
=== Sources ===
- Candé, Roland de (1986). Dictionnaire des musiciens (in French). Paris: Editions de Seuil. ISBN 2-02-000299-X.
- Duchen, Jessica (2000). Gabriel Fauré. London: Phaidon. ISBN 0-7148-3932-9.
- Harding, James (1965). Saint-Saëns and His Circle. London: Chapman and Hall. OCLC 519518.
- Henderson, A. M. (April 1937). "Widor and His Organ Class". The Musical Times: 341–345. (subscription required)
- Jones, J. Barrie (1989). Gabriel Fauré: A Life in Letters. London: Batsford. ISBN 0-7134-5468-7.
- March, Ivan; Edward Greenfield; Robert Layton; Paul Czajkowski (2008). The Penguin Guide to Recorded Classical Music 2009. London: Penguin. ISBN 978-0-141-03335-8.
- Murray, Michael (1998). French Masters of the Organ: Saint-Saëns, Franck, Widor, Vierne, Dupré, Langlais, Messiaen. New Haven: Yale University Press. ISBN 978-0-30-007291-4.
- Nectoux, Jean-Michel (1991). Gabriel Fauré: A Musical Life. Cambridge: Cambridge University Press. ISBN 0-521-23524-3.
- Noël, Edouard; Edmond Stoullig (1881). Les Annales du théâtre et de la musique, 1880. Paris: Charpentier. OCLC 172996346.
- Orledge, Robert (1979). Gabriel Fauré. London: Eulenburg Books. ISBN 0-903873-40-0.
- Philipp, Isidor (April 1944). "Charles-Marie Widor: A Portrait". The Musical Quarterly. (subscription required)
- Slonimsky, Nicolas; Laura Kuhn, eds. (2001). Baker's Biographical Dictionary of Music and Musicians. Vol. 6. New York: Schirmer. ISBN 0-02-865571-0.
- Thompson, Andrew (1987). Widor. Oxford: Oxford University Press. ISBN 0-19-316417-5.
- Vallas, Léon (1951). César Franck. London: Harrap. OCLC 910827.
- Widor, Charles-Marie (1904). Technique de l'orchestre moderne (in French). Paris: Henry Lemoine. OCLC 963388714.
