= Symphony for Organ No. 5 =

Organ symphony by Charles-Marie Widor

Symphonie V
- Organ symphony by Charles-Marie Widor
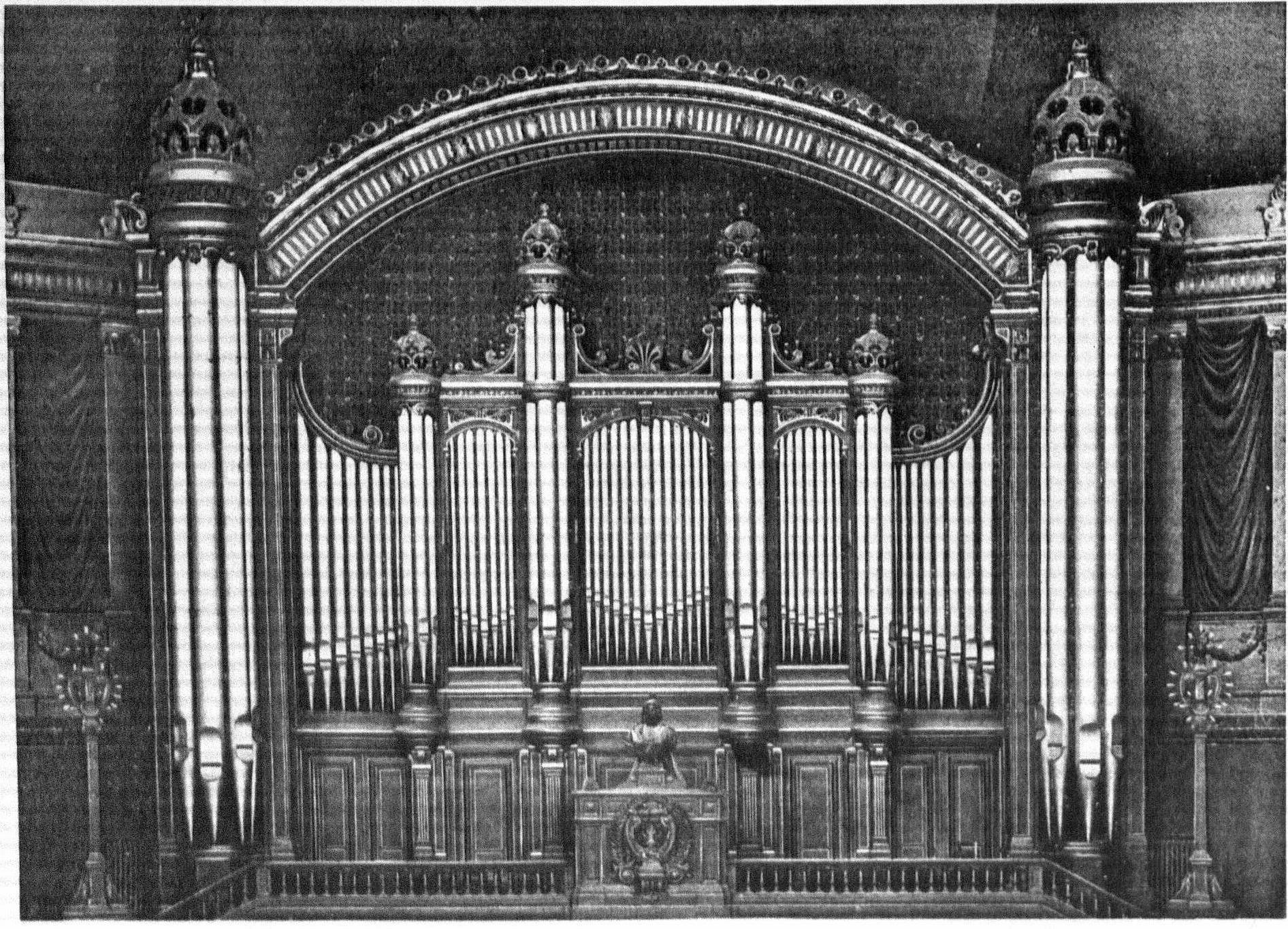
- The Cavaillé-Coll organ at the Trocadéro Palace, where the composer premiered his work
- Key: F minor
- Opus: 42/1
- Composed: 1878–1879
- Performed: 19 October 1879: Paris
- Movements: 5

The Symphony for Organ No. 5 in F minor, Op. 42, No. 1, is an organ symphony composed by Charles-Marie Widor between 1878 and 1879, whilst he was the organist at Saint-Sulpice in Paris. It was first performed in public on 19 October 1879, when it was played by the composer at the city's Trocadéro Palace. Following its initial publication, Widor made changes to the work in four subsequent editions. The full symphony lasts for about 35 minutes, and was recorded by Widor in April 1932.

The final movement, a toccata, is one of the most commonly-known and frequently recorded organ pieces, having come to widespread attention when it replaced Mendelssohn's Wedding March at the marriage of Princess Margaret and Antony Armstrong-Jones in 1960.

== Structure ==
Widor: Symphonie pour orgue No. 5, Op. 42, No. 1 – V. Toccata (conclusion)
Performed by Hans-Eberhard Roß

The piece consists of five movements:

1. Allegro vivace
2. Allegro cantabile
3. Andantino quasi allegretto
4. Adagio
5. Toccata

== Toccata ==
The fifth movement, a toccata in F major, is often referred to as just Widor's Toccata because it is his most famous piece. It lasts around six minutes. Its fame in part comes from its frequent use as recessional music at festive Christmas, Easter, and wedding ceremonies.

The melody of Widor's Toccata is based upon an arrangement of rapid staccato arpeggios which form phrases, initially in F, moving in fifths through to C major, G major, etc. Each phrase consists of one bar. The melody is complemented by syncopated chords, forming an accented rhythm against the perpetual arpeggio motif. The phrases are contextualised by a descending bass line, often beginning with the 7th tone of each phrase key. For example, where the phrase consists of an arpeggio in C major, the bass line begins with a B♭. The arpeggios eventually modulate through all twelve keys, until Widor brings the symphony to a close with fortississimo block chords in the final three bars.

Many organists play it at a very fast tempo whereas Widor preferred a more controlled articulation to be involved. He recorded the piece, at St. Sulpice in his eighty-ninth year; the tempo used for the Toccata is quite slow.

Following Widor's example, other composers adopted this style of toccata as a popular genre in French Romantic organ music, including notable examples from Eugène Gigout, Léon Boëllmann, Louis Vierne, Henri Mulet, and Marcel Dupré.

=== Usage at royal weddings ===
==== Denmark ====
- Princess Margrethe and Henri de Laborde de Monpezat on 10 June 1967 at the Holmen Church
- Prince Joachim and Alexandra Christina Manley on 18 November 1995 at Frederiksborg Castle Church
- Crown Prince Frederik and Mary Donaldson on 14 May 2004 at Church of Our Lady in Copenhagen

==== Britain ====
- Princess Margaret and Antony Armstrong-Jones on 6 May 1960 at Westminster Abbey
- The Duke of Kent and Katharine Worsley on 8 June 1961 at York Minster
- Princess Alexandra of Kent and Angus Ogilvy on 24 April 1963 at Westminster Abbey
- The Princess Anne and Captain Mark Phillips on 14 November 1973 at Westminster Abbey
- The Prince Edward and Sophie Rhys-Jones on 19 June 1999 at St George's Chapel, Windsor Castle
- Prince William of Wales and Catherine Middleton on 29 April 2011 at Westminster Abbey

==== Norway ====
- Princess Märtha Louise and Ari Behn on 24 May 2002 at Nidaros Cathedral

=== Notable recordings ===
==== Video ====
- Fifth movement performed by Frederick Hohman at the Cathedral Basilica of the Sacred Heart (Newark, New Jersey)
- Fifth movement performed by Kalevi Kiviniemi at the Saint-Ouen Abbey, Rouen

==== Audio ====
- Fifth movement performed by the composer at the Église Saint-Sulpice, Paris (link to YouTube video).
- Conclusion of the First Movement played by Marcel Dupré on the Alexandra Palace organ, 7 March 1930 (direct link to MP3 file).
- Fifth movement produced for the RollerCoaster Tycoon video game series by British video game musician Allister Brimble and performed by Peter James Adcock (link to YouTube video).
