= Julien Hamelle =

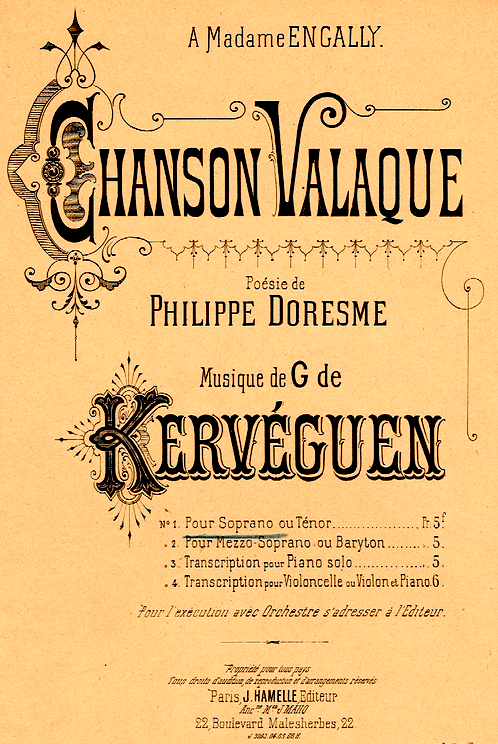
Chanson valaque

Julien Aimable Hamelle (6 September 1836 – 7 October 1917) was a French music publisher.

== Life ==
Hamelle was born in Sains-Richaumont (Aisne) and died at Saint-Cloud. Hamelle took over the publisher Jacques Maho in 1877 and, well beyond the year 1914, signalled that he was the successor, with the mention "Ancienne maison J. Maho".

Based in Paris at 25 rue du faubourg Saint-Honoré until 1882, the business then moved to 22 Boulevard Malesherbes. He published works by Johannes Brahms, Gabriel Fauré, Édouard Lalo, Vincent d'Indy, Gabriel Pierné, Camille Saint-Saëns, César Franck, Charles-Marie Widor, Benjamin Godard, and many others.

Around 1890, in a printed note, he informed his clientele that the house "G. Flaxland & Fils, piano makers, has been sold to him by its director Eugène Grumbach and that he undertakes to continue 'as in the past, the manufacture, sale and rental of pianos'".

When he died in 1917, the music collection he exploited was valued at one million francs. His two sons, Georges-Edgar and Louis-Gilbert are presented as music publishers on the succession deed. Only Georges-Edgar took over the management from 1921. Today, Éditions Alphonse Leduc distributes the catalogue.

== Sources ==
- Les éditions Hamelle
