= Merseburg (Verwaltungsgemeinschaft) =

Municipality in Saxony-Anhalt, Germany

Coordinates: 51.367°N 12.000°E

Merseburg was a Verwaltungsgemeinschaft ("collective municipality") in the Saalekreis district, in Saxony-Anhalt, Germany. The seat of the Verwaltungsgemeinschaft was in Merseburg. It was disbanded on 1 January 2010.

The Verwaltungsgemeinschaft Merseburg consisted of the following municipalities:

1. Geusa
2. Merseburg
