= Musikverein =

Concert hall in Vienna, Austria

Wiener Musikverein
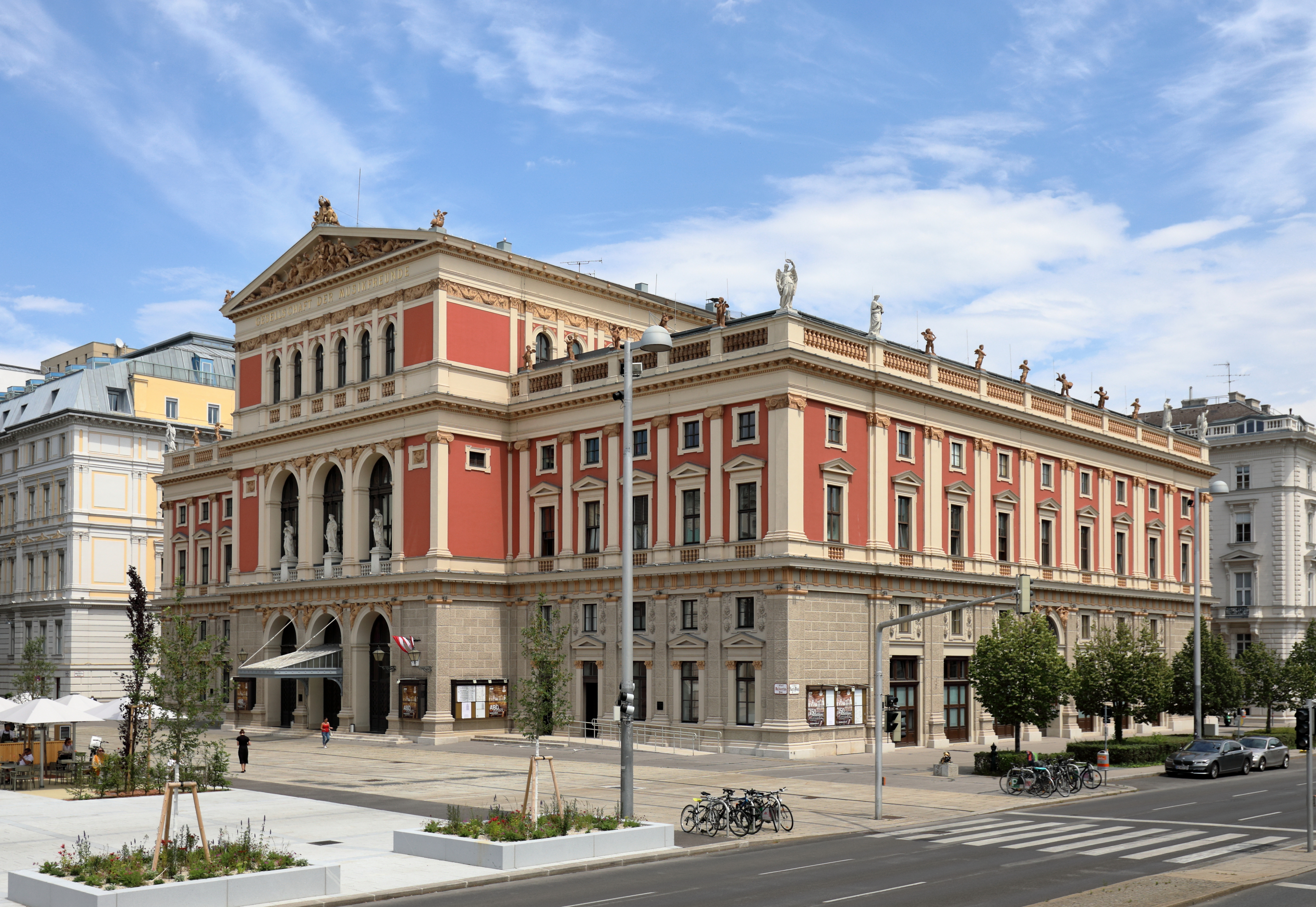
- View of the Musikverein from Karlsplatz

General information
- Type: Concert hall
- Architectural style: Neoclassical
- Location: Vienna, Austria
- Coordinates: 48°12′02″N 16°22′20″E
- Current tenants: Vienna Philharmonic
- Inaugurated: 6 January 1870

Design and construction
- Architect: Theophil Hansen

Website
- musikverein.at

The Wiener Musikverein (German: [ˌviːnɐ muˈziːkfɐ̯ˌaɪn] or German: [ˌviːnɐ muˈziːkfəˌʁaɪn]; German for 'Viennese Music Association'), commonly shortened to Musikverein, is a concert hall in Vienna, Austria, which is located in the Innere Stadt district. During the 1863 construction of the Vienna Ring Road (Ringstraße) a piece of land for a new concert hall was granted to the Society of Friends of Music in Vienna by Emperor Franz Joseph I of Austria. Designed by Danish-born architect Theophil Hansen, the concert hall has housed the Vienna Philharmonic since its opening in 1870.

The acoustics of the building's 'Great Hall' (Großer Saal) have earned it recognition alongside other prominent concert halls, such as the Konzerthaus in Berlin, the Concertgebouw in Amsterdam and Symphony Hall in Boston.

== Building ==
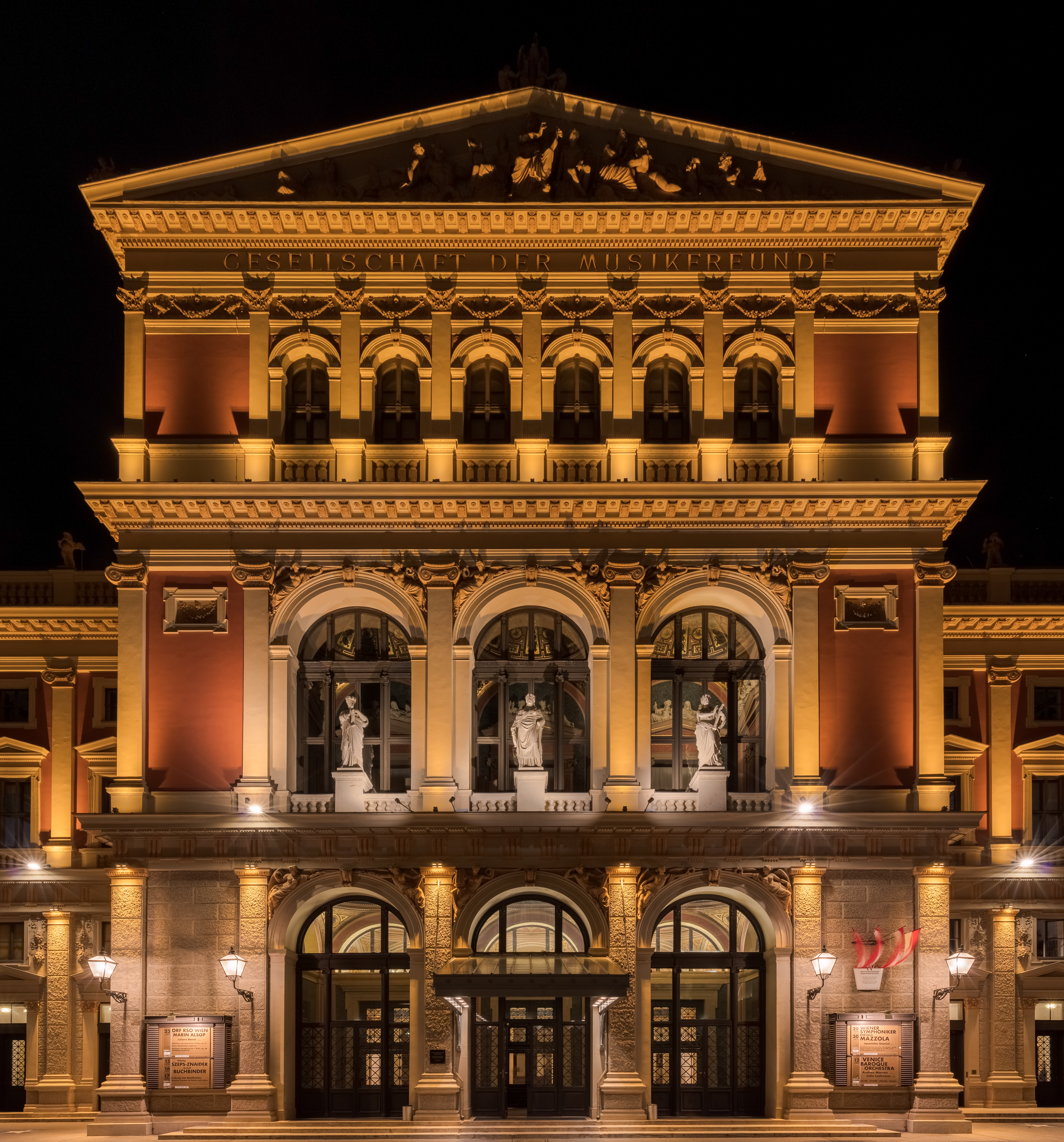
The Musikverein's front façade by night

The Musikverein's main entrance is situated on Musikvereinsplatz, between Karlsplatz and Bösendorferstraße. The building is located behind the Hotel Imperial that fronts on Kärntner Ring, which is part of the Vienna Ring Road (Ringstraße).

The plans were designed by Danish architect Theophil Hansen in the Neoclassical style of an ancient Greek temple, including a concert hall and a smaller chamber music hall. The building was inaugurated on 6 January 1870. A major donor was Nikolaus Dumba, an industrialist and liberal politician of Aromanian Greek - Albanian (Voskopoja) descent, whose name was given by the Austrian government to a small street (Dumbastraße) near the Musikverein. Another important donor, also of Aromanian descent, was Simon Sinas.

== Golden Hall ==
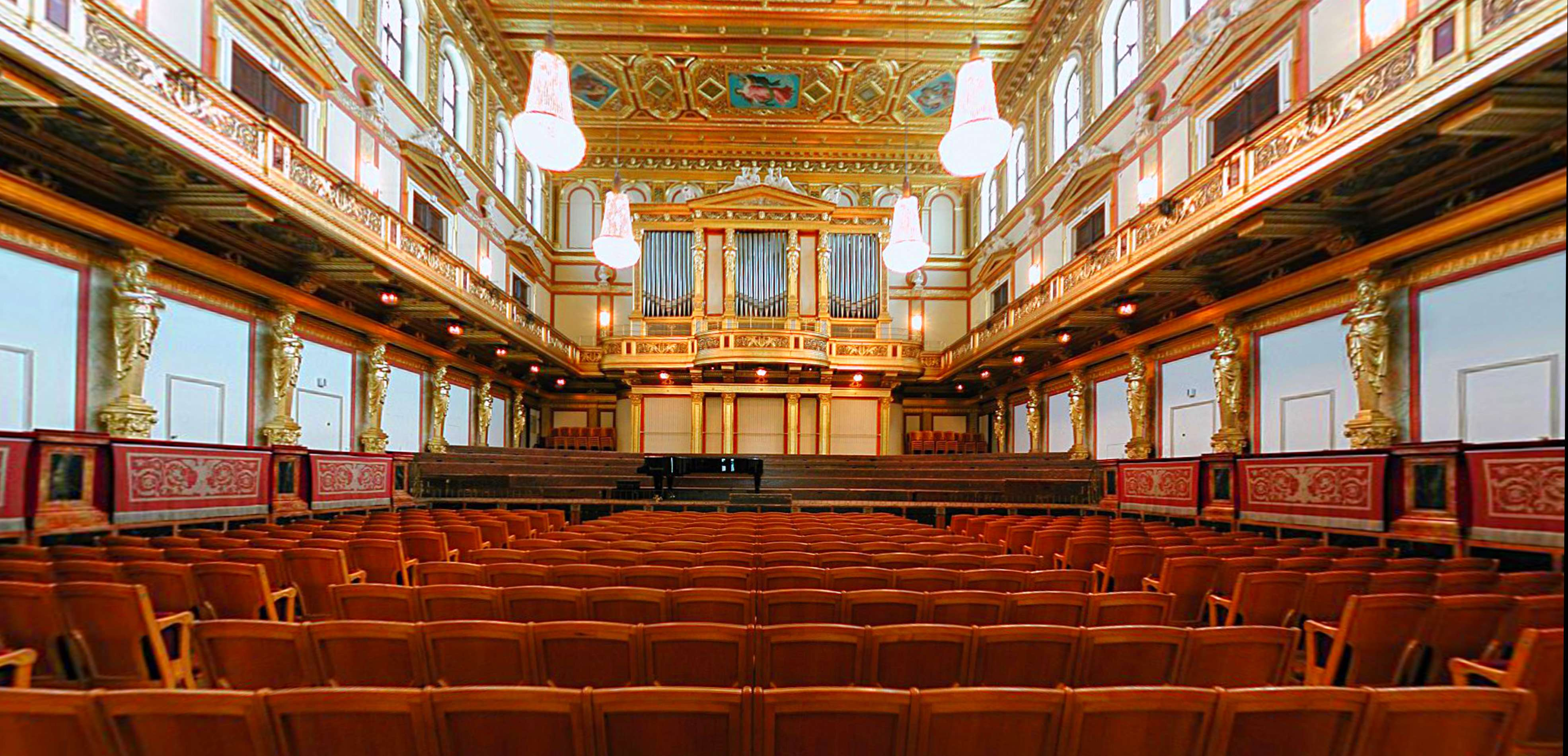
The Great Hall, also known as the Golden Hall

The Great Hall (Großer Musikvereinssaal), also called the Golden Hall (Goldener Saal) considered one of the best concert halls in the world. It is especially ideal for classical and romantic music.

It is 49 m (161 ft) long, 19 m (62 ft) wide, and 18 m (59 ft) high, and has 1,744 seats and standing room for 300.

The Great Hall originally included a historic pipe organ built by Friedrich Ladegast. Its first organ recital was held by Anton Bruckner in 1872. The present-day instrument was originally installed in 1907 by the Austrian firm of Rieger Orgelbau, highly esteemed by musicians such as Franz Schmidt or Marcel Dupré, and rebuilt in 2011.

The Skandalkonzert of 1913 was given there, and it is the venue for the annual Vienna New Year's Concert.

=== Acoustics ===
The Great Hall's lively acoustics are primarily based on Hansen's intuition, as he could not rely on any studies on architectural acoustics. The "shoebox" narrow shape of the hall, thick plaster walls and multiple reflective and diffusing surfaces provide strong lateral reflections and create a warm, rich and clear sound.

=== Gallery ===
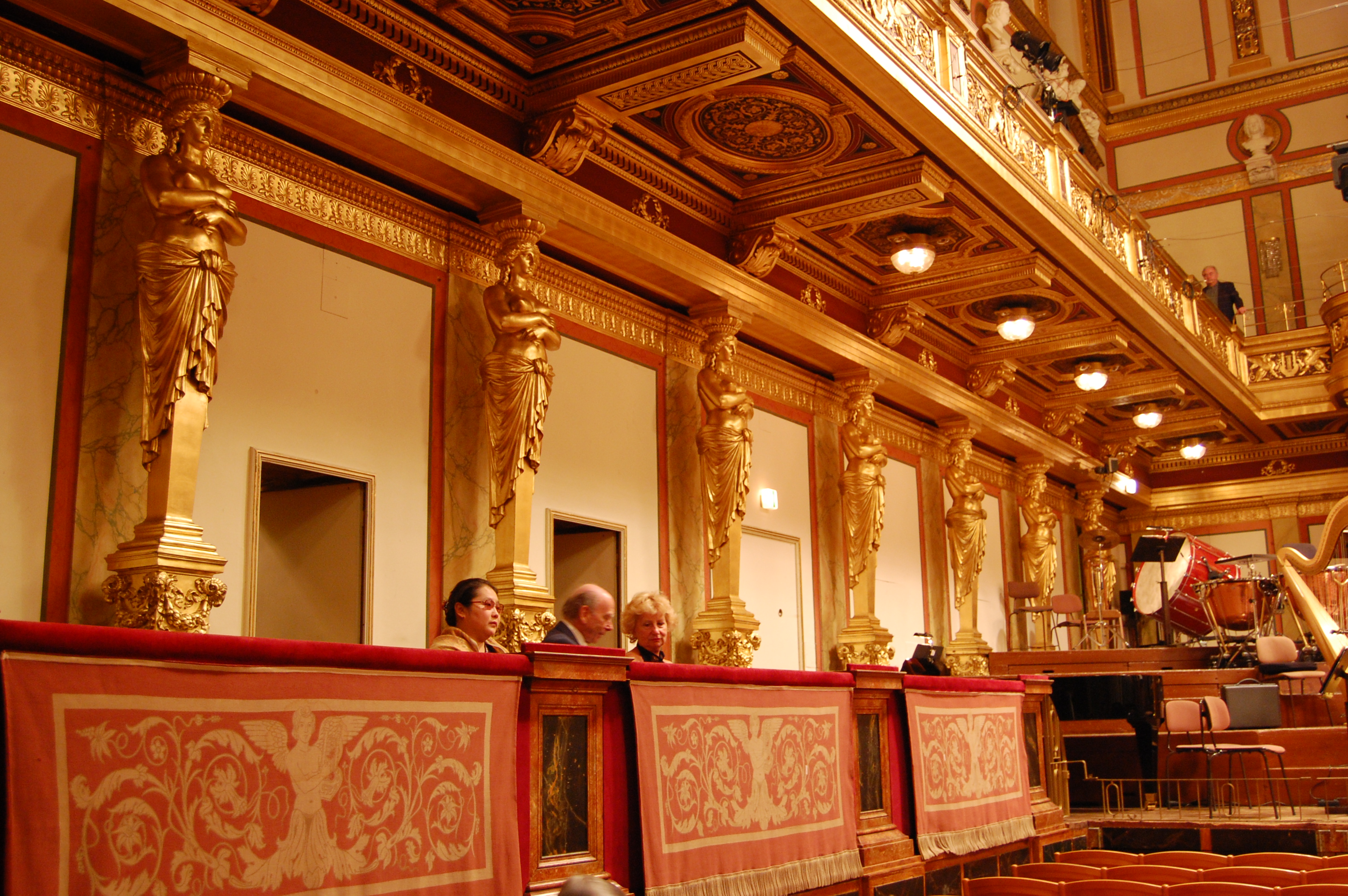
Ground floor boxes

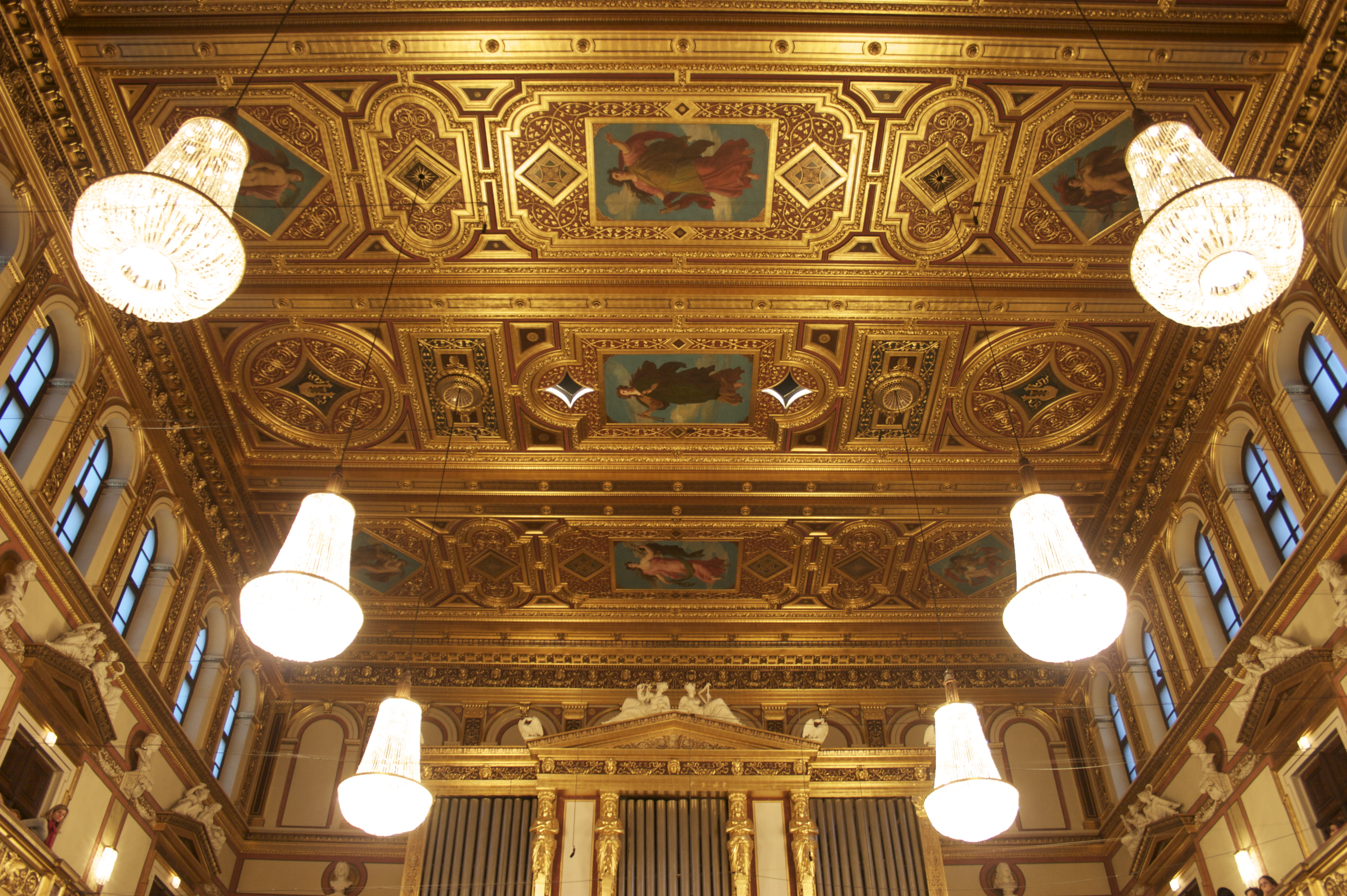
Ceiling

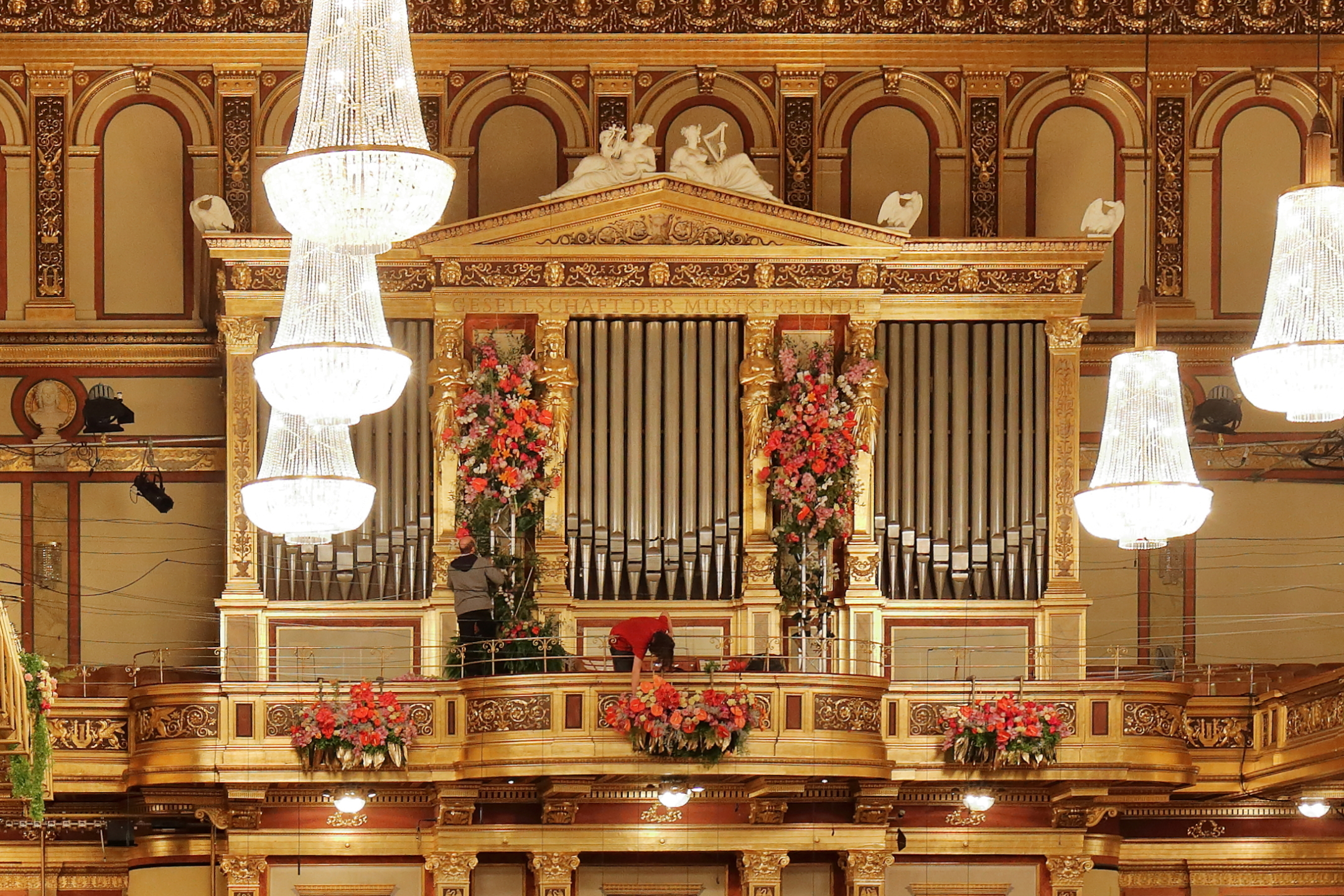
The 1907 organ

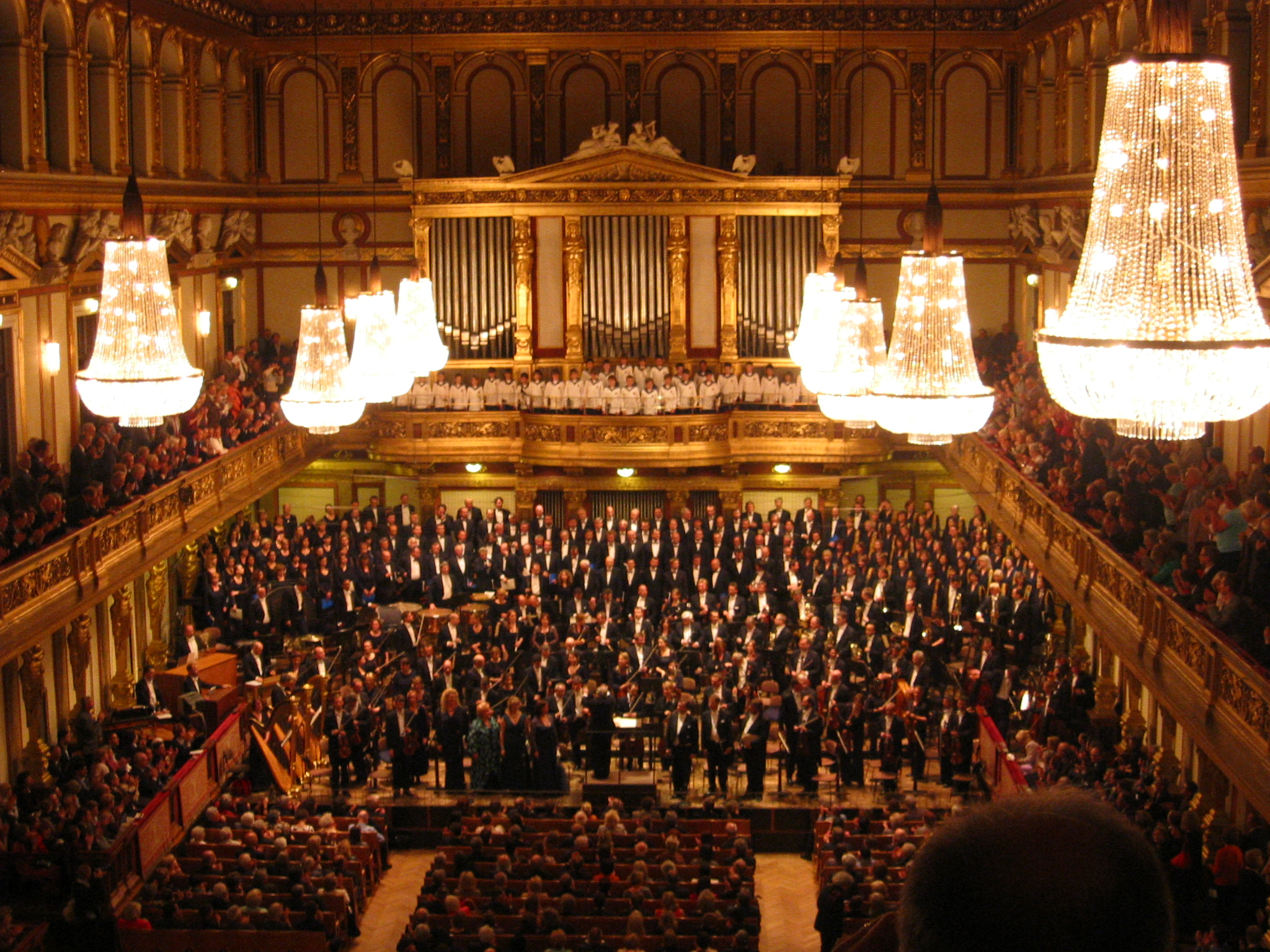
The Staatskapelle Berlin, Wiener Singverein and Vienna Boys' Choir, 2009

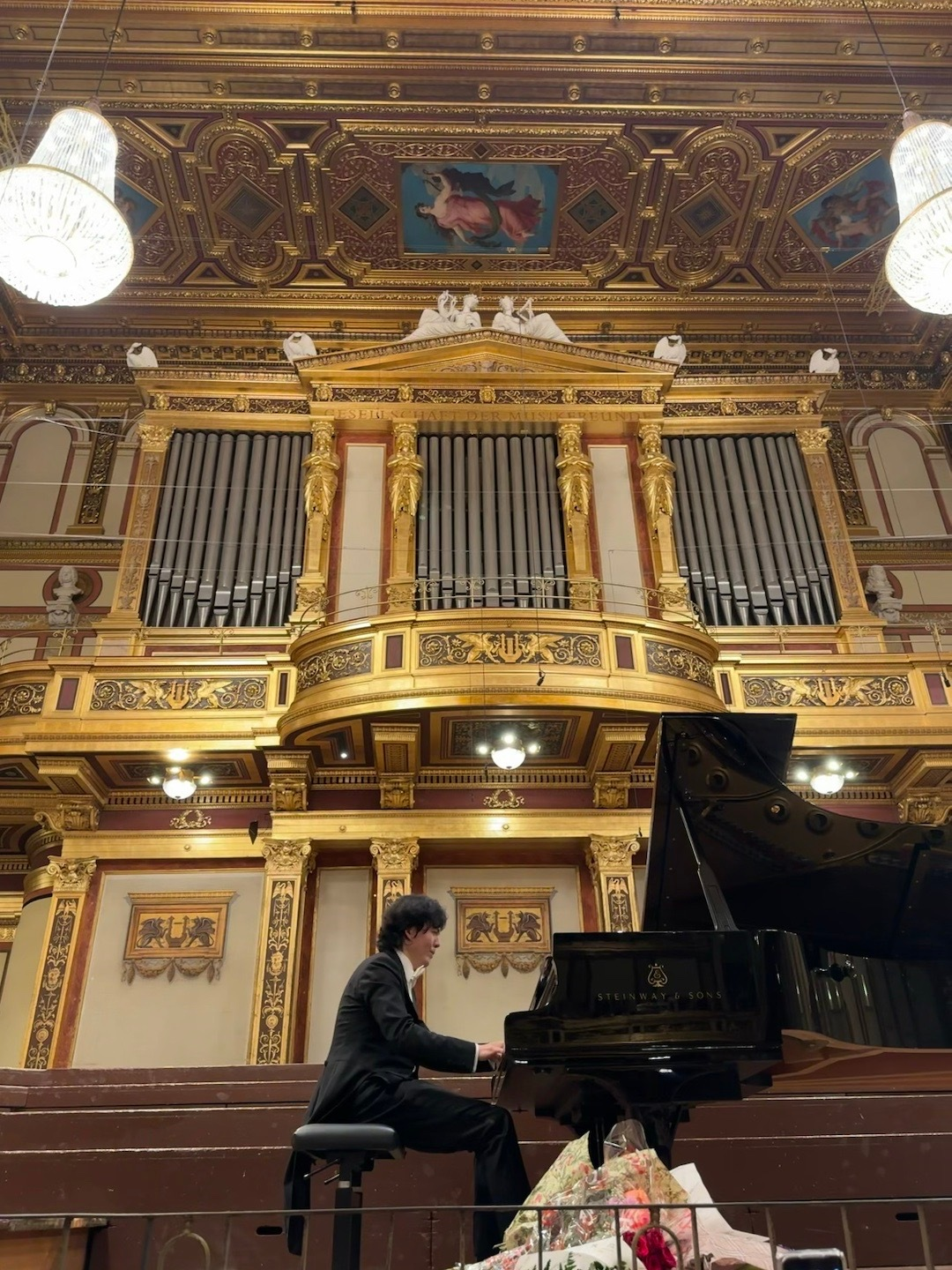
The pianist Yundi, 2024

== Other Halls ==
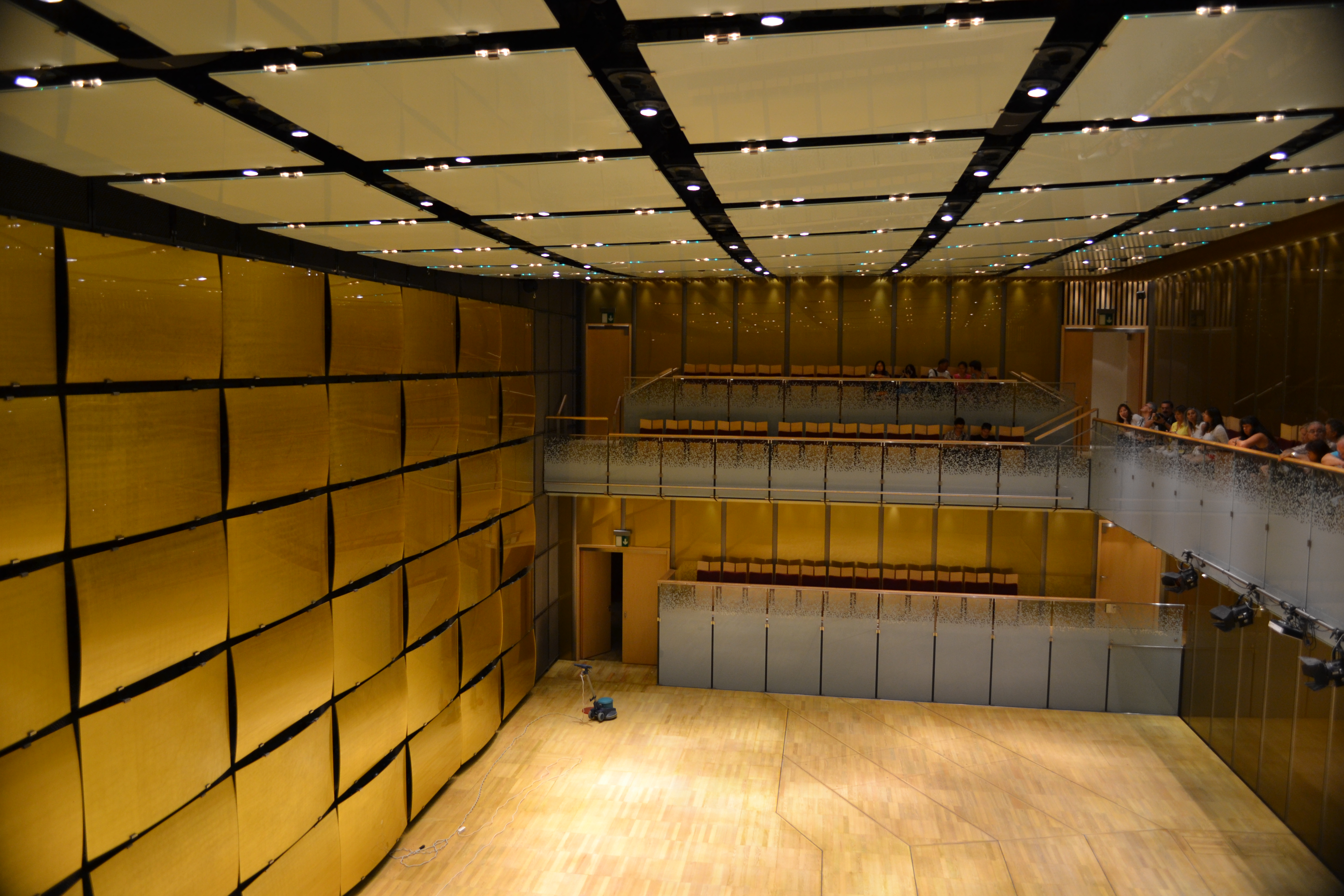
Gläserner Saal / Magna Auditorium

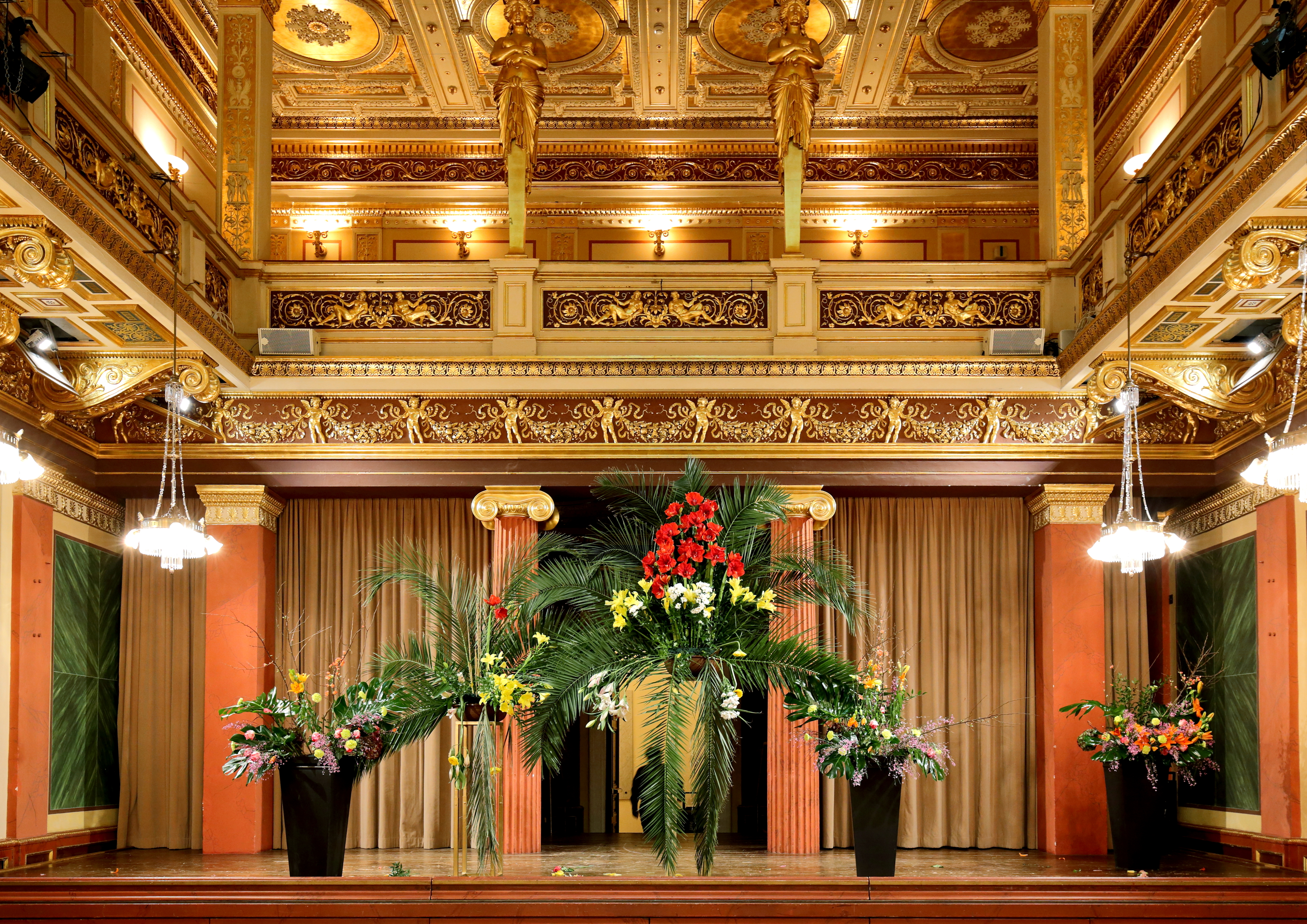
Brahmssaal

Venue	Size	Height	Seats
Großer Musikvereinssaal (Goldener Saal)	48.8 × 19.1 m	17.75 m	1744 seats and c. 300 standing
Brahmssaal	32.5 × 10.3 m	11 m	600 seats
Gläserner Saal/Magna Auditorium	22 × 12.5 m	8 m	380 seats
Metallener Saal	10.5 × 10.8 m	3.2 m	70 seats
Steinerner Saal/Horst Haschek Auditorium	13 × ~8.6 m	~3.3m	60 seats
Hölzerner Saal (not used for concerts)	11.5 × 7.5 m	3.4m	60 seats

The Brahms Hall/Brahmssaal, named after German Composer Johannes Brahms, is the second largest hall in the building.Until 1937, this hall was only known as "Kleine Muskivereinssaal." This Greek Renaissance hall was Brahms Hall remains one of the most prized locations for the greatest chamber ensembles and lieder singers. Described as the "true little treasure chest," the Brahms Hall is praised for its peacefulness and simple grandeur that rivaled The Golden Hall (Großer Musikvereinssaal).

In 2001, Austrian Architect, Wilhelm Hozbauer and Dieter Irresberger were commissioned to design four new music halls beneath the Golden Hall. Holzbauer and Irresberger worked closely with acoustic consultant, Karl Bernd Quiring to ensure superb acoustic qualities that paralleled the Golden Hall. In 2004, the underground expansion was finalized, adding the Glass, Steel, Wooden, and Stone Halls. These halls serve as highly versatile venues for concerts, lectures, conferences, and receptions.

Magna Auditorium or the Glass Hall is the largest of the four rooms and should replicate the acoustic conditions of the Golden Hall when it is filled with people. These acoustic conditions are achieved through glass panels that are covered with a layer of gold leaves that are both fixed and moveable. The moveable convex glass elements enlarge the absorbing surfaces.

Metallener Saal or the Metal Hall is one of the smaller venues and is mainly used for workshops, experimental music, and new scenic productions. About 55% of the entire wall is covered with four rows of perforated metal panels which allow slightly reverberant to studio atmosphere that is suitable for percussive ensembles.

Hölzerner Saal or the Wooden Hall is mainly used for smaller events, receptions, cocktails, seminars, lectures, and press conferences. It acts as the perfect buffet and break room for events in the Glass Hall. The space is flexible with a sliding door, turning it into an extension of the foyer area.

Horst Haschek Auditorium or the Stone Hall mixes historical artifacts and modern architecture. Surrounded by historical musical instruments, valuable manuscripts, and rough and polished stone surfaces create a setting for presentations, press conferences, banquets, and showcases. The halls flexible seating can accommodate a variety of capacities and events, ranging from 20 to 80 people.
