= Adalbert of Magdeburg =

German saint, archbishop and missionary (c. 910 – 981)

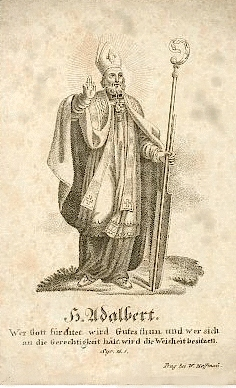
- Holy Card for St. Adalbert of Magdeburg

Archbishop of Magdeburg Abbot of Wissembourg Apostle of the Slavs
- Born: c. 910; Alsace or Lorraine, France
- Died: 20 June 981 (aged 70–71); Zscherben
- Venerated in: Catholic Church; Eastern Orthodox Church
- Feast: 20 June

Adalbert of Magdeburg (c. 910 – 20 June 981), sometimes incorrectly shortened to "Albert", known as the Apostle of the Slavs, was the first Archbishop of Magdeburg (from 968) and a successful missionary to the Polabian Slavs to the east of what was contemporarily Germany. He was later canonised and his liturgical feast day was assigned as 20 June.

== Life ==
Adalbert was born c. 910, possibly in Alsace or Lorraine, France. He was a German monk at the Benedictine Monastery of St. Maximinus in Trier, Germany. He was consecrated a Catholic bishop and in 961 was sent to Kievan Rus. Princess Olga of Kiev had asked Emperor Otto I (the Great) to provide her a missionary from the Catholic Church. Her son took the crown from her in 961, just as Adalbert arrived in Kievan Rus. Adalbert's missionary companions were slain and Adalbert barely escaped. Kievan Rus subsequently was converted by missionaries from Constantinople and became part of Byzantine Christianity.

Upon escaping Kievan Rus, Adalbert traveled to the imperial court at Mainz, Germany, where he remained for four years, until he was named Abbot of Wissembourg in Alsace. There he worked to improve the education of the monks. He later became the first Archbishop of Magdeburg, Saxony-Anhalt, in contemporary Germany. Adalbert travelled to Rome to receive the pallium before assuming his see.

The Archiepiscopacies of Hamburg and Bremen had been established with the intention that they would serve as bases for missions in northern and eastern Europe. The Archdiocese of Magdeburg was designated to provide missionaries to the eastern European Slavs. Adalbert also established dioceses for Naumburg; Meissen; Merseburg; Brandenburg; Havelberg; and Poznań, Poland. He died on 20 June 981 in Zscherben (contemporarily in (former) Geusa, in Merseburg, Saxony-Anhalt, Germany).

A student of Adalbert for some years named Vojtěch Slavníkovec, who at his Confirmation, took the very name of his tutor, went on from Adalbert's tutelage to successfully evangelize many Slavic peoples, received the crown of martyrdom in Prussia, and was canonized as St. Adalbert of Prague.

Saint Adalbert's Cemetery in Milwaukee, Wisconsin, is dedicated to the archbishop of Magdeburg.

Adalbert, also Adalbertus, Adelbertus, and Albertus Born: circa 910 in Lorraine, France Died: 20 June 981 in Zscherben (contemporarily in (former) Geusa, in Merseburg, Saxony-Anhalt, Germany)
Christian
New diocese	Archbishop of Magdeburg; 968–981	Succeeded by Gisilher
