= Friedrich Ladegast =

German organ builder (1818–1905)

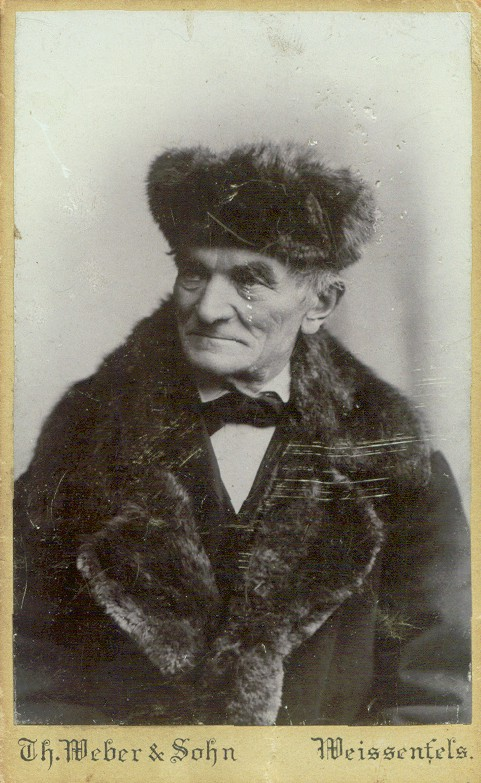
Friedrich Ladegast

Friedrich Ladegast (August 30, 1818 – June 30, 1905) was a famous German organ builder.

Ladegast was born in Hochhermsdorf (now Hermsdorf), Saxony, to a carpenter and cabinet-maker. He worked first for his brother Christlieb, an organ builder at Geringswalde, and built his first two organs at the age of twenty. He then traveled as a journeyman to various workshops, including those of Johann Gottlob Mende in Leipzig, Urban Kreutzbach in Borna, Adolf Zuberbier in Dessau, Martin Wetzel in Strasbourg, and Aristide Cavaillé-Coll in Paris. His work with Cavaillé-Coll was especially influential on his own designs; the two developed a friendship, and Ladegast introduced many technical innovations learned from Cavaillé-Coll's workshop to Germany, such as swell pedals and Barker levers.

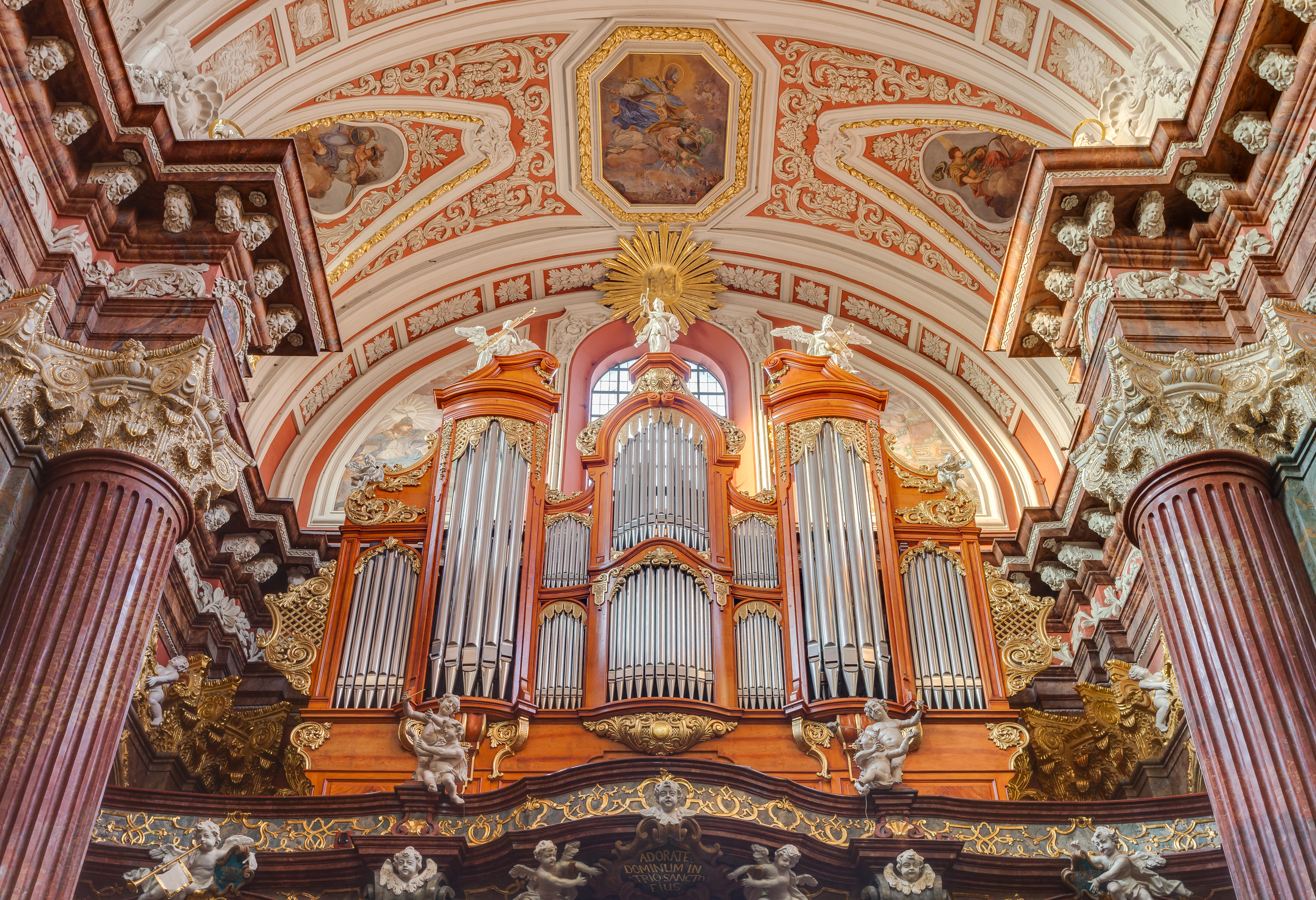
The Ladegast organ in the Poznań Collegiate

He set up his own workshop at Weißenfels in 1846, with his first commission being for a small organ in Geusa. He went on to build over 200 organs, with notable works including the reconstruction of the organ of the Merseburg Cathedral (IV/81, 1855), and building the organ of the Nikolaikirche in Leipzig (IV/84,1859–62). His largest instrument was for Schwerin Cathedral (IV/84, 1870–71). His son, Oskar Ladegast, took over his firm in 1898.
