= Beuna =

- Stadtteil of Merseburg
- Interactive map of Beuna
- Location within Germany Location within Saxony-Anhalt
- Coordinates: 51°19′N 11°57′E
- Country: Germany
- State: Saxony-Anhalt
- District: Saalekreis
- Town: Merseburg

Area
  - Total: 6.01 km^{2} (2.32 sq mi)
- Elevation: 104 m (341 ft)

Population (2006-12-31)
  - Total: 1,009
  - Density: 168/km^{2} (435/sq mi)
- Time zone: UTC+01:00 (CET)
  - Summer (DST): UTC+02:00 (CEST)
- Postal codes: 06217
- Dialling codes: 03461

Beuna is a village and a former municipality in the Saalekreis district, in Saxony-Anhalt, Germany. Since 1 January 2009, it is part of the town Merseburg.
