= Merseburg =

Town in Saxony-Anhalt, Germany

- Town
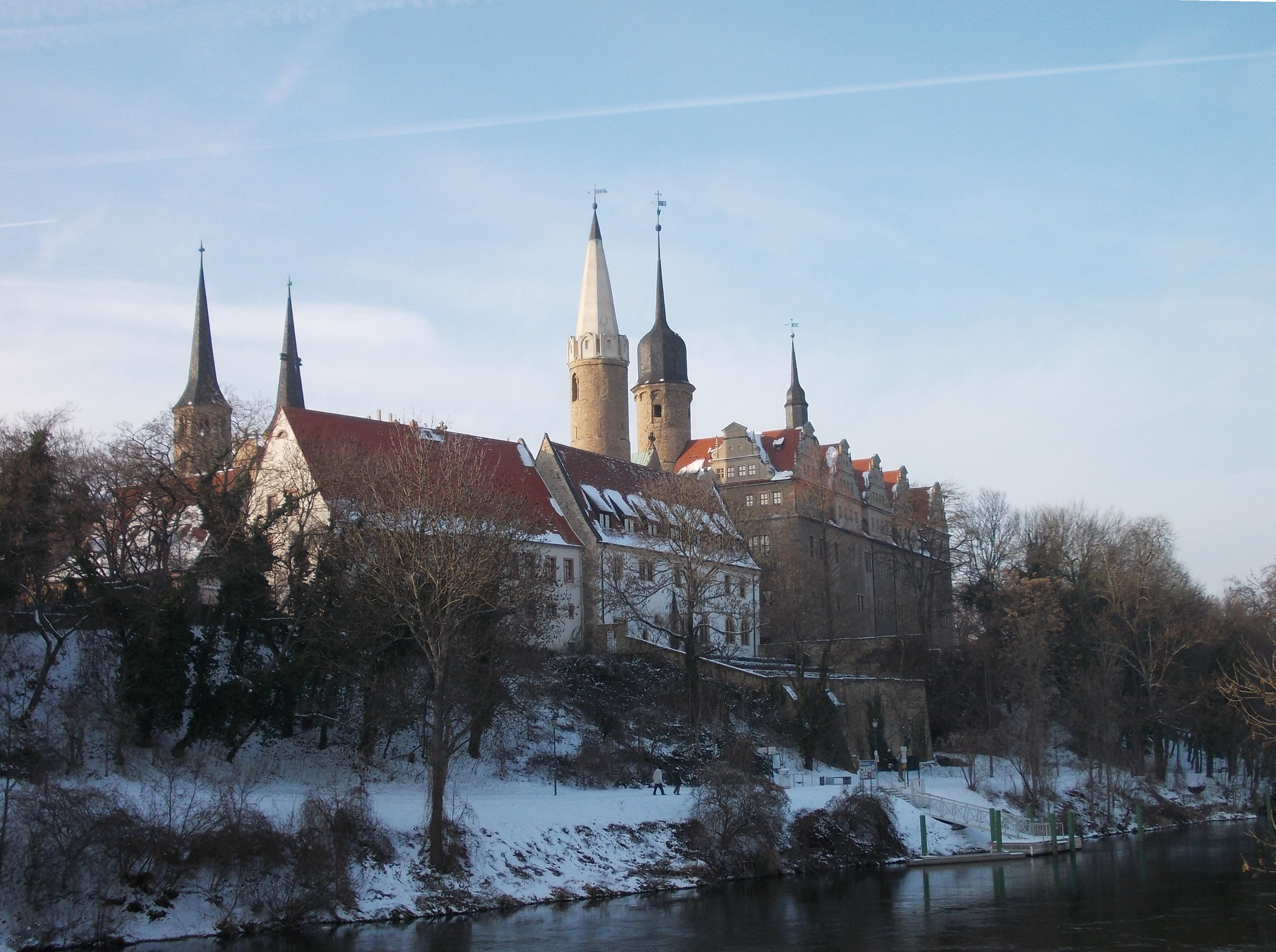
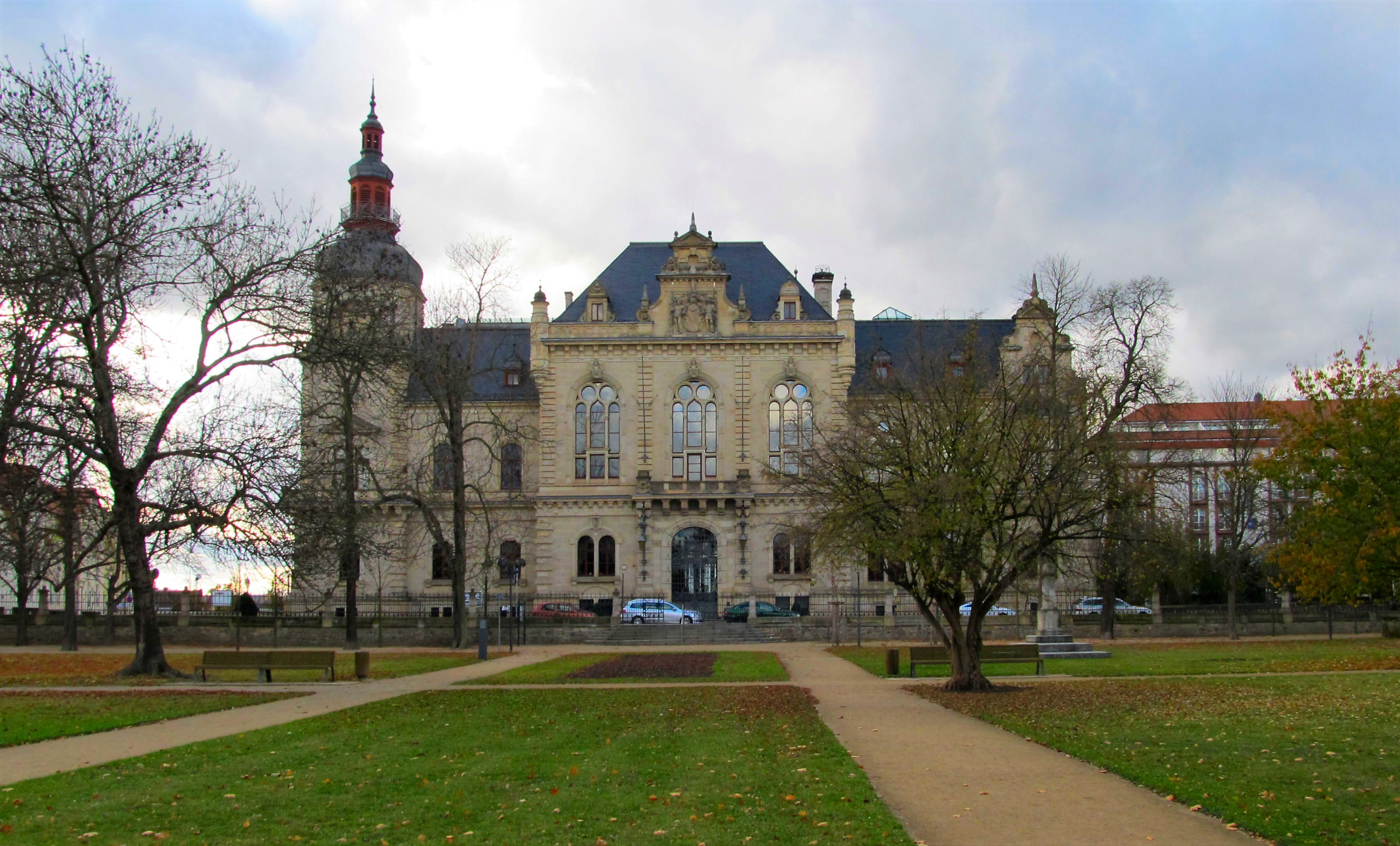
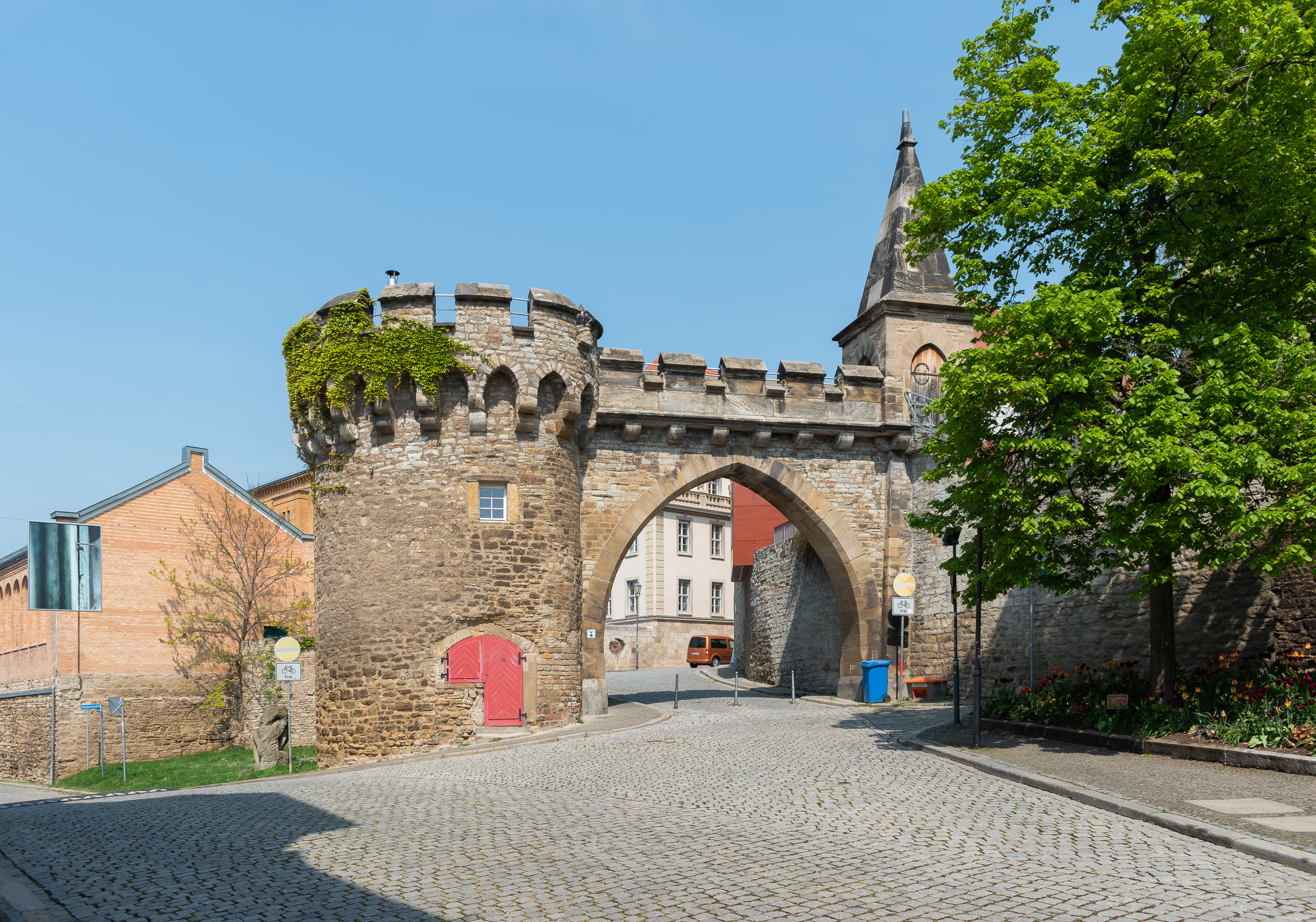
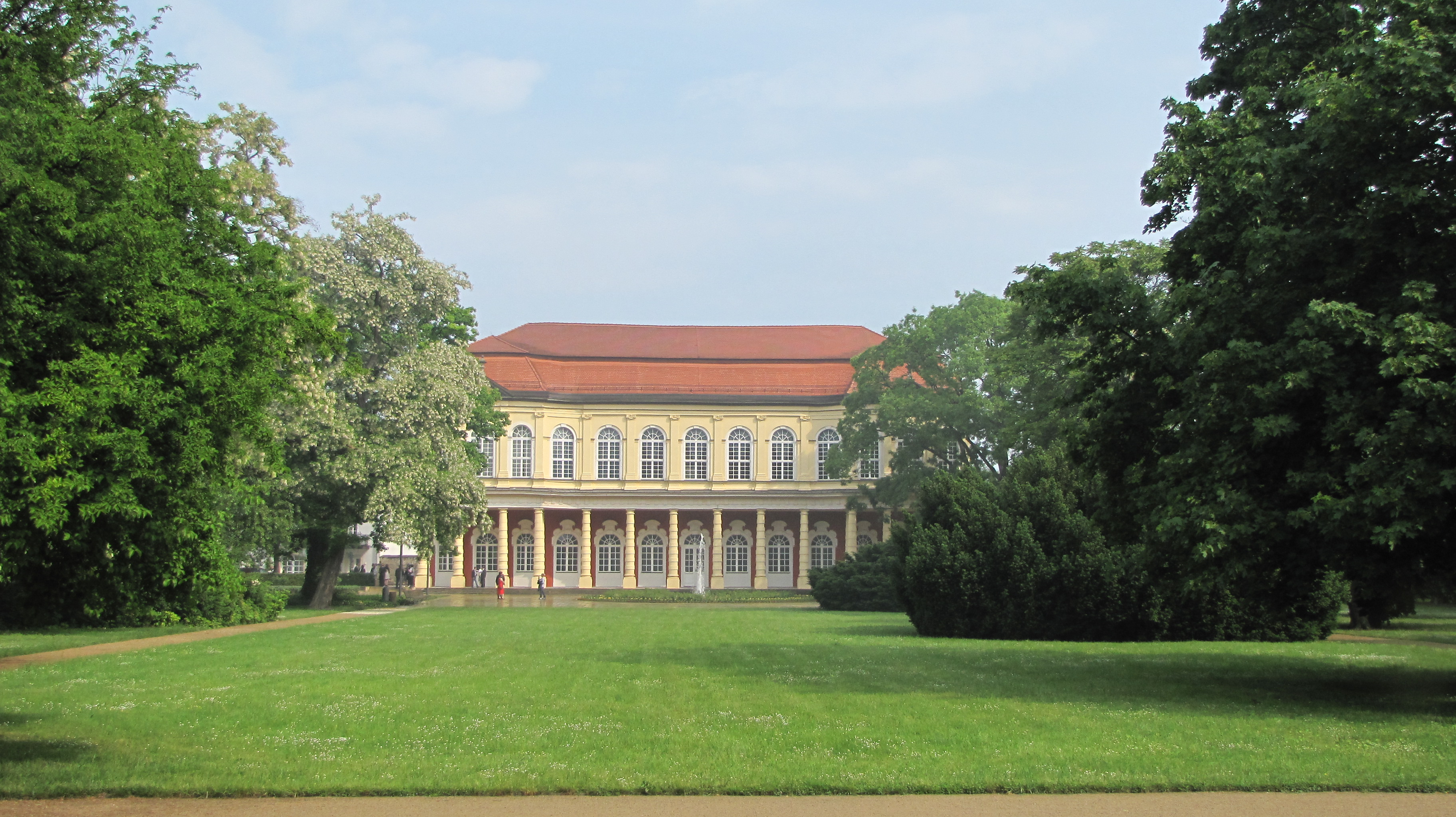
- Merseburg Castle and Cathedral Ständehaus Krummes Tor Orangerie in the Castle garden

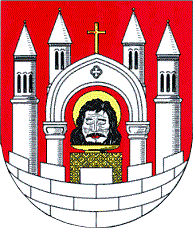
- Coat of arms

- Location of Merseburg within Saalekreis district
- Interactive map of Merseburg
- Location within Germany Location within Saxony-Anhalt
- Coordinates: 51°21′16″N 11°59′34″E
- Country: Germany
- State: Saxony-Anhalt
- District: Saalekreis

Government
  - Mayor (2022–29): Sebastian Müller-Bahr

Area
  - Total: 53.76 km^{2} (20.76 sq mi)
- Elevation: 88 m (289 ft)

Population (2025-12-31)
  - Total: 34,491
  - Density: 641.6/km^{2} (1,662/sq mi)
- Time zone: UTC+01:00 (CET)
  - Summer (DST): UTC+02:00 (CEST)
- Postal codes: 06217
- Dialling codes: 03461
- Vehicle registration: SK, MER, MQ
- Website: www.merseburg.de

Merseburg (German pronunciation: [ˈmɛʁzəbʊʁk]) is a town in central Germany in southern Saxony-Anhalt, situated on the river Saale, and approximately 14 km south of Halle (Saale) and 30 km west of Leipzig. It is the capital of the Saalekreis district. It had a diocese founded by Archbishop Adalbert of Magdeburg. The University of Merseburg is located within the town. Merseburg has around 35,000 inhabitants.

== Names ==
- Czech: Merseburk, Meziboř
- French: Mersebourg
- German: Merseburg
- Latin: Merseburga
- Polish: Międzybórz
- Sorbian languages: Mjezybor

== Geography ==
The town Merseburg consists of Merseburg proper and the following four Ortschaften or municipal divisions:

- Beuna (Geiseltal)
- Geusa
- Meuschau
- Trebnitz

=== Administrative reforms ===
Venenien was incorporated into Merseburg on 1 January 1949. The parish Kötzschen followed on 1 July 1950. Since 30 May 1994, Meuschau is part of Merseburg. Trebnitz, previously part of Kreypau, followed in 2003. Beuna was annexed on 1 January 2009. Geusa is a part of Merseburg since 1 January 2010.

== History ==
Historical affiliations

Bishopric of Merseburg 1004-1565
Electorate of Saxony 1565-1657
Duchy of Saxe-Merseburg 1657-1738
Poland-Saxony 1738-1763
Electorate of Saxony 1763-1806
Kingdom of Saxony 1806-1815
Kingdom of Prussia 1815-1871
German Empire 1871-1918
Weimar Republic 1918-1933
Nazi Germany 1933-1945
Allied-occupied Germany 1945-1949
East Germany 1949-1990
Germany 1990-present

=== Middle Ages ===
Merseburg was first mentioned in 850. King Henry the Fowler built a royal palace at Merseburg; in the 933 Battle of Riade, he gained his great victory over the Hungarians in the vicinity.

Thietmar, appointed in 973, became the first bishop of the newly created bishopric of Prague in Bohemia. Prague had been part of the archbishopric of Mainz for a hundred years before that. From 968 until the Protestant Reformation, Merseburg was the seat of the Bishop of Merseburg, and in addition to being for a time the residence of the margraves of Meissen, it was a favorite residence of the German kings during the 10th, 11th and 12th centuries. Fifteen diets were held here during the Middle Ages, during which time its fairs enjoyed the importance which was afterwards transferred to those of Leipzig. After Ekkehard's treacherous death on 3 April 1002, Bolesław I Chrobry took Merseburg and Meissen, and then Milsko with Bautzen and Strehla, with the help of the local Slavic population. The German princes accepted the sovereignty of the Polish prince in these areas. Some historians believe that since the convention in Gniezno, the Brave might have had certain rights to the German throne after Otto III, guaranteed by some succession document. Merseburg was later the site of a failed assassination attempt on Polish ruler Bolesław I Chrobry in 1002. The town suffered severely during the German Peasants' War and also during the Thirty Years' War.

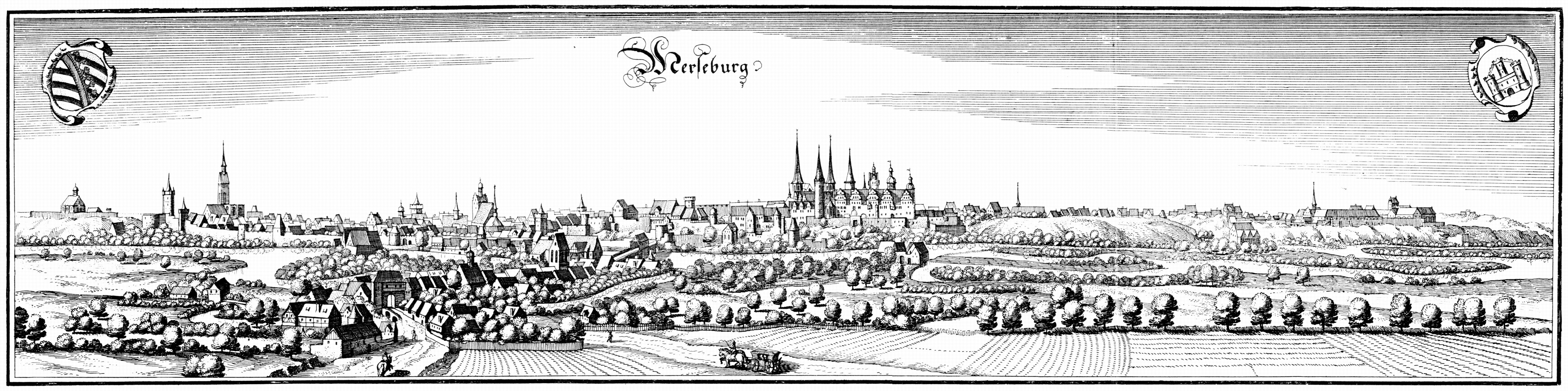
Merseburg in 1650

=== 17th century to 20th century ===
From 1657 to 1738 Merseburg was the residence of the Dukes of Saxe-Merseburg, after which it fell to the Electorate of Saxony. In 1815 following the Napoleonic Wars, the town became part of the Prussian Province of Saxony.

Merseburg is where the Merseburg Incantations were rediscovered in 1841. Written down in Old High German, they are hitherto the only preserved German documents with a heathen theme. One of them is a charm to release warriors caught during battle, and the other is a charm to heal a horse's sprained foot.

At the beginning of the 20th century, Merseburg was transformed into an industrial town, largely due to the pioneering work done by Carl Bosch and Friedrich Bergius, who laid down the scientific fundamentals of the catalytic high-pressure ammonia synthesis from 1909 to 1913. The nearby Leuna works continue this tradition of chemical industry. The Merseburger Tageblatt was published as a local newspaper in Merseburg.

Merseburg was badly damaged in World War II. In 23 air raids, 6,200 dwellings were completely or partly destroyed. The historic town centre was almost completely destroyed.

Briefly part of Saxony-Anhalt after the war, it was then administered within the Bezirk Halle in East Germany. It became part of Saxony-Anhalt again after the reunification of Germany.

== Demographics ==
Like many towns in the former East Germany, Merseburg has had a general decline in population since German Reunification despite annexing and merging with a number of smaller nearby villages.

Population of Merseburg (from 1960, population on 31 December, unless otherwise indicated):

1834 to 1933

- 1834: 8,830
- 1875: 13,664
- 1880: 15,205
- 1890: 17,669
- 1925: 25,630
- 1933: 31,576

1939 to 1984

- 1939: 38,058
- 1946: 33,978 ^{1}
- 1950: 38,441 ^{2}
- 1960: 47,199
- 1981: 50,932
- 1984: 48,399

1990 to 2007

- 1990: 43,815 ^{3}
- 1995: 41,576
- 2000: 37,127
- 2005: 34,581
- 2006: 34,411
- 2007: 34,039 ^{4}

from 2008

- 2008: 34,623
- 2009: 34,313
- 2010: 35,419
- 2012 33,520
- 2015 34,052

from 2016

- 2016 33,931
- 2017 34,197
- 2021: 34,785
- 2022: 35,815

Data source from 1990: Statistical Office of Saxony Anhalt
1 29 October
2 31 August
3 3 October
4 14 July 2008

== Sights ==
Among the notable buildings of Merseburg are the Merseburg Cathedral of St John the Baptist (founded 1015, rebuilt in the 13th and 16th centuries) and the episcopal palace (15th century). The cathedral-and-palace ensemble also features a palace garden.

Other sights include the Merseburg House of Trades with a cultural stage and the German Museum of Chemistry, Merseburg.

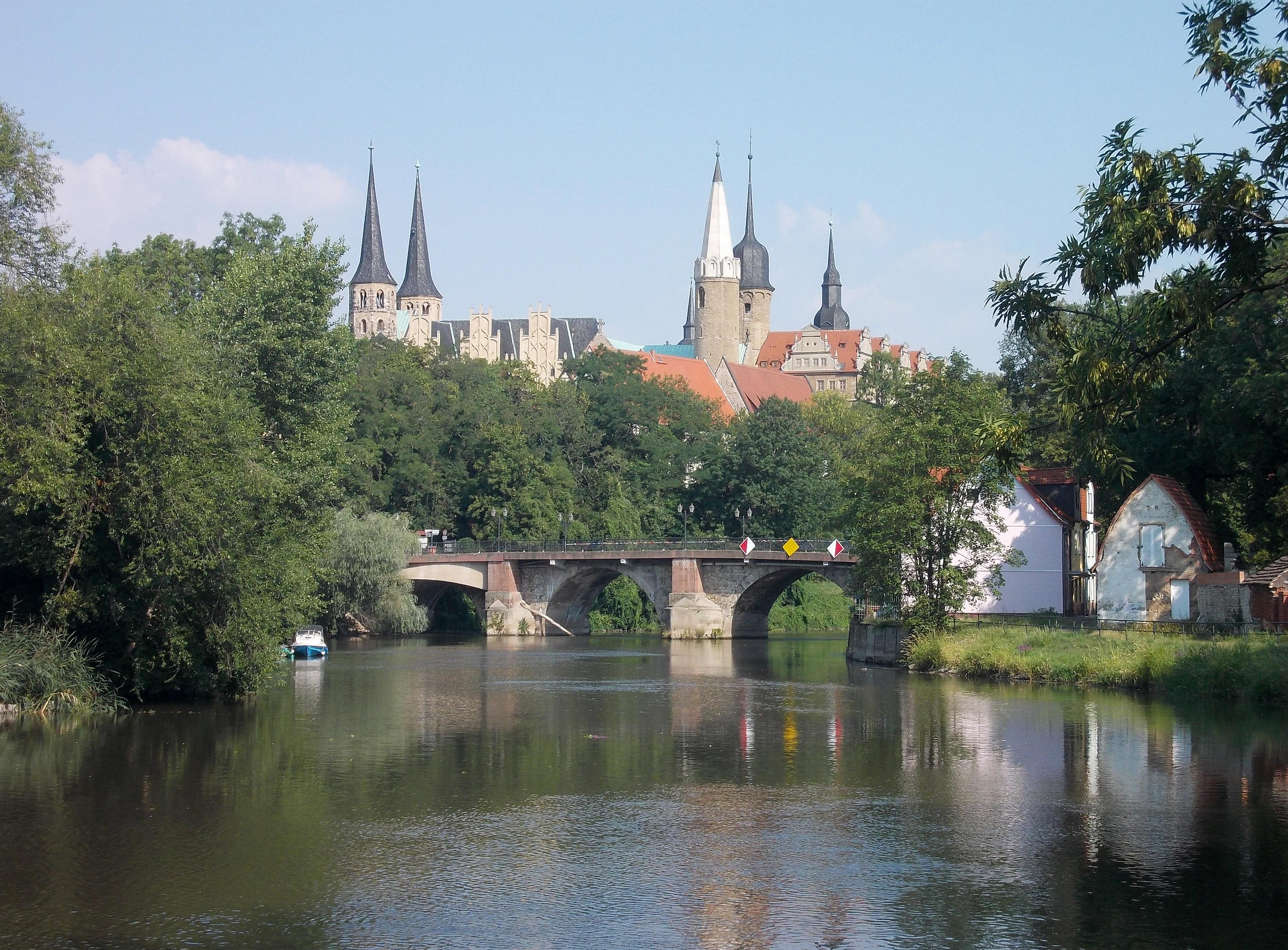
Merseburg Castle

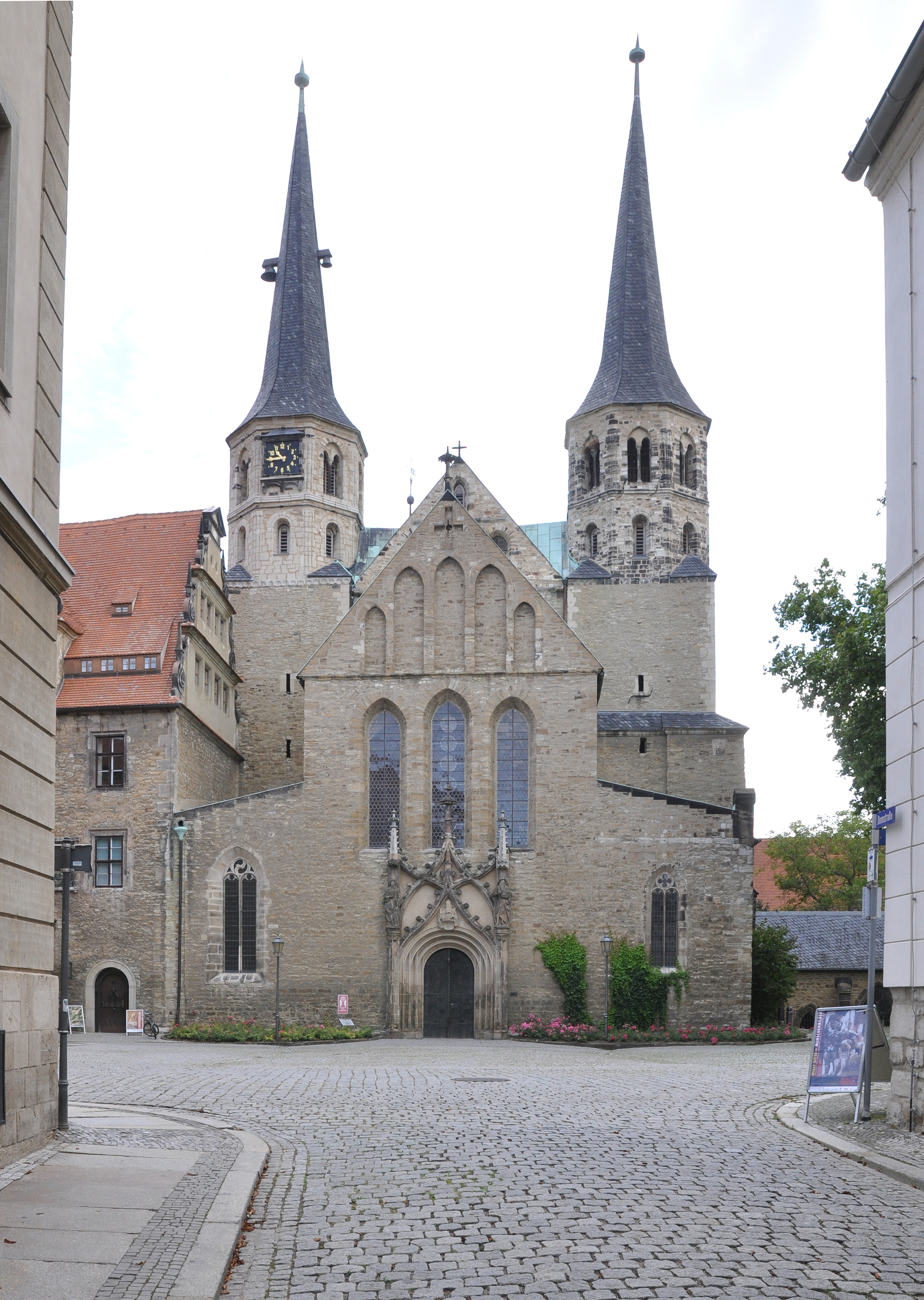
Cathedral

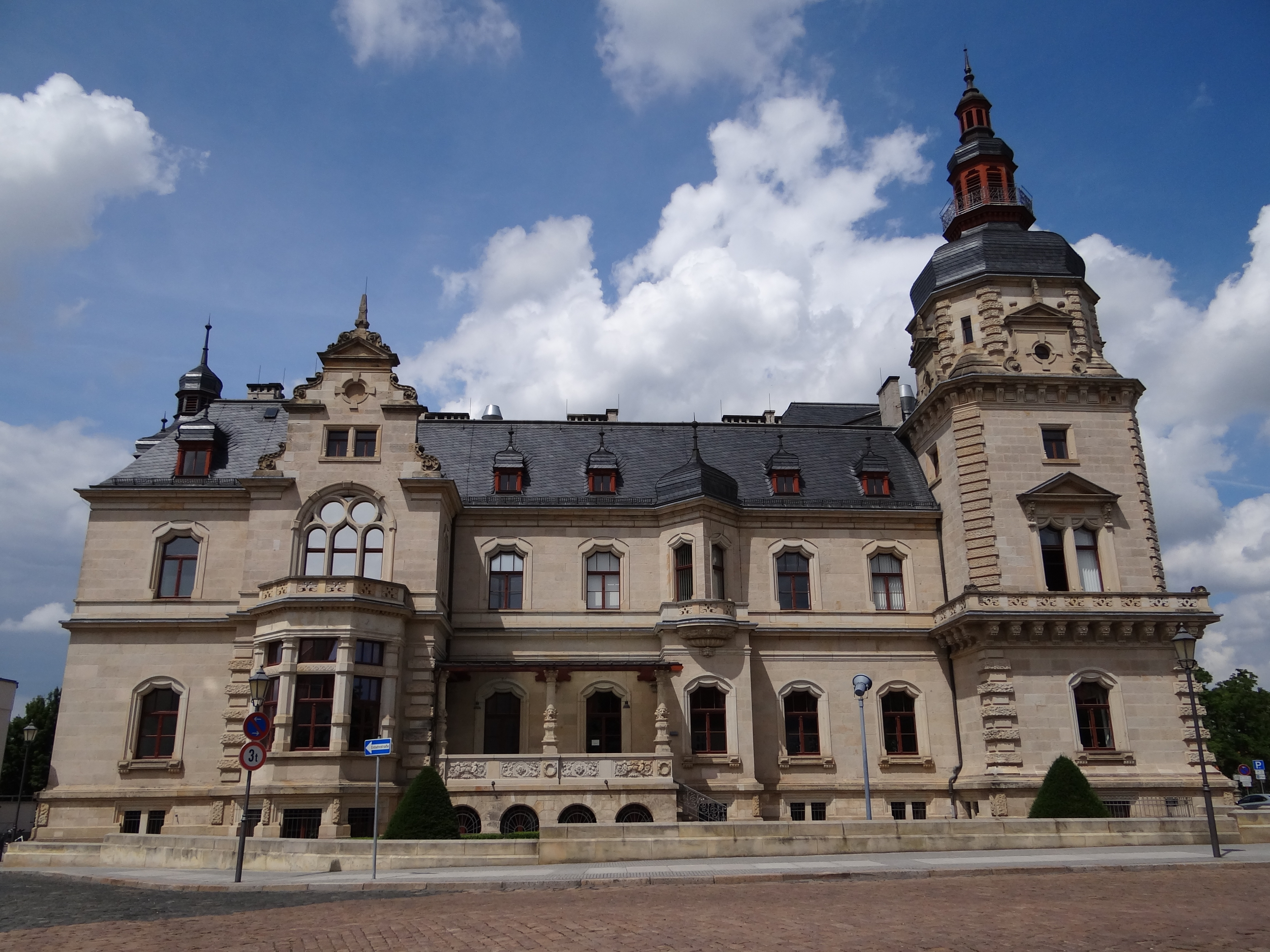
Ständehaus

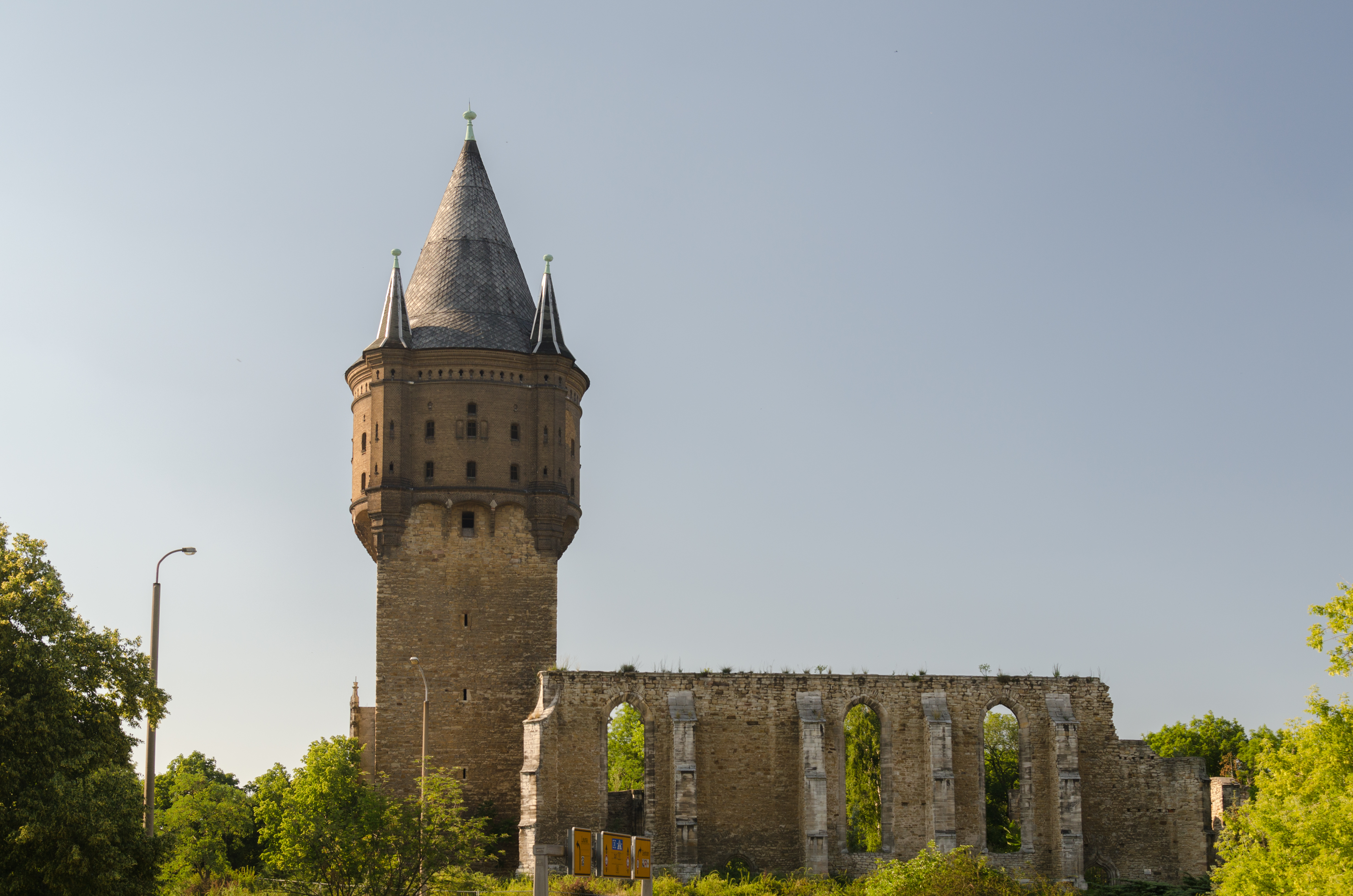
St. Sixti

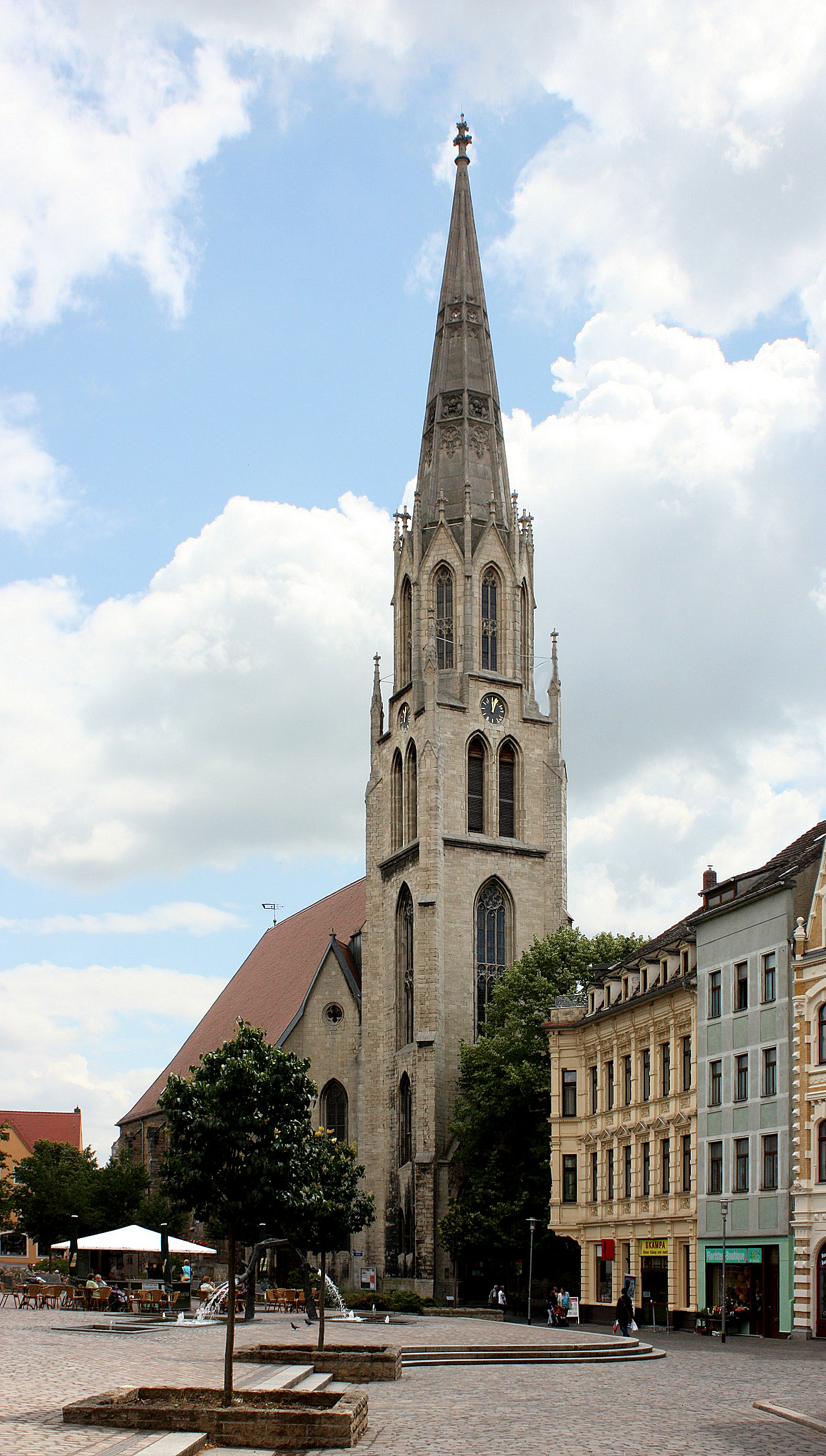
St. Maximi Church

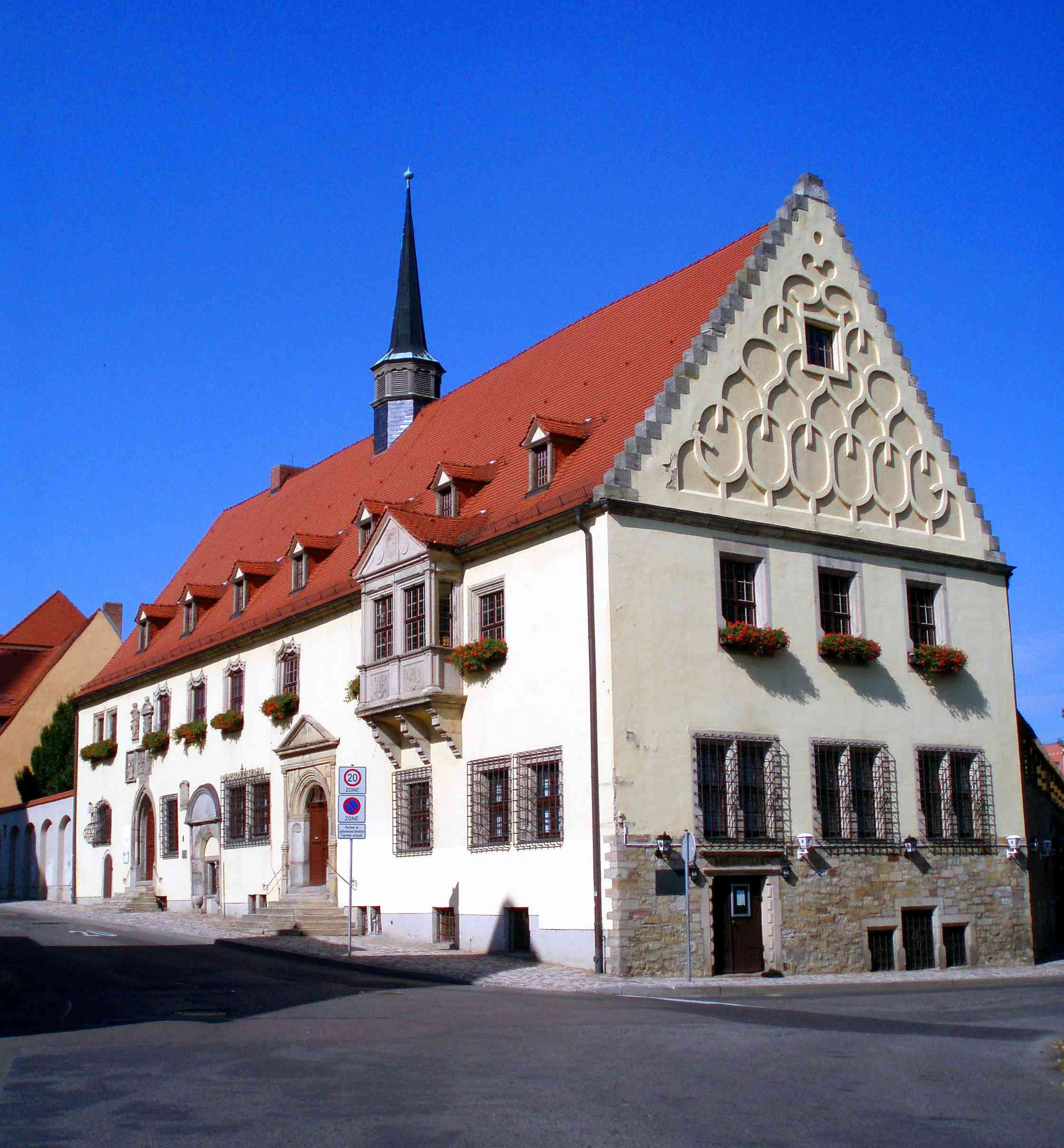
Old Town Hall

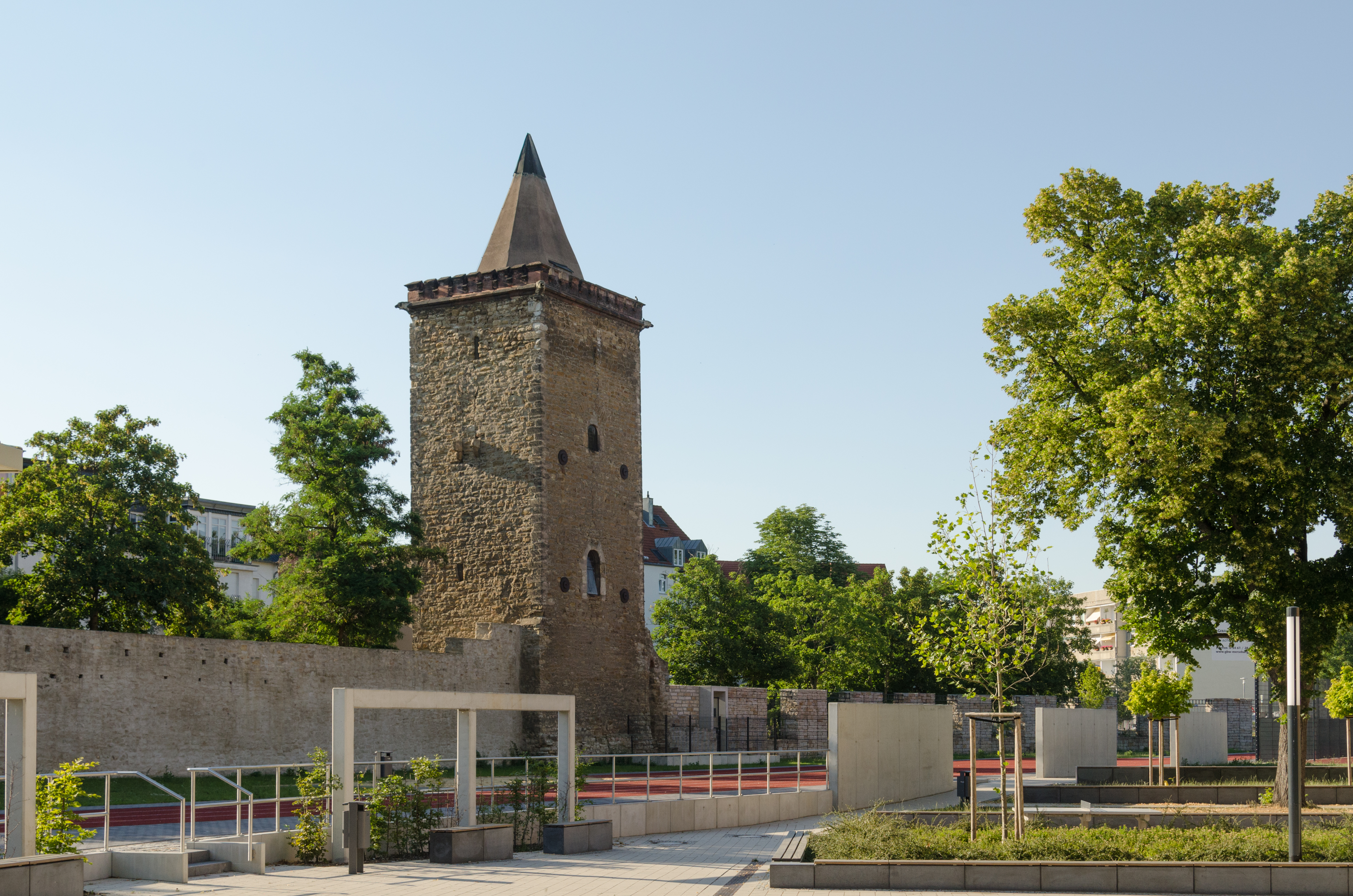
Eulenturm

== Arts and culture ==
The Merseburg Palace Festival with the Historical Pageant, the International Palace-Moat Concerts, Merseburg Organ Days and the Puppet Show Festival Week are events celebrated every year.

== Transport ==
Merseburg station is located on the Halle–Bebra railway. Leipzig/Halle Airport is 25 kilometers away. Merseburg is connected with the Halle (Saale) tramway network. A tram ride from Halle's city centre to Merseburg takes about 50 minutes.

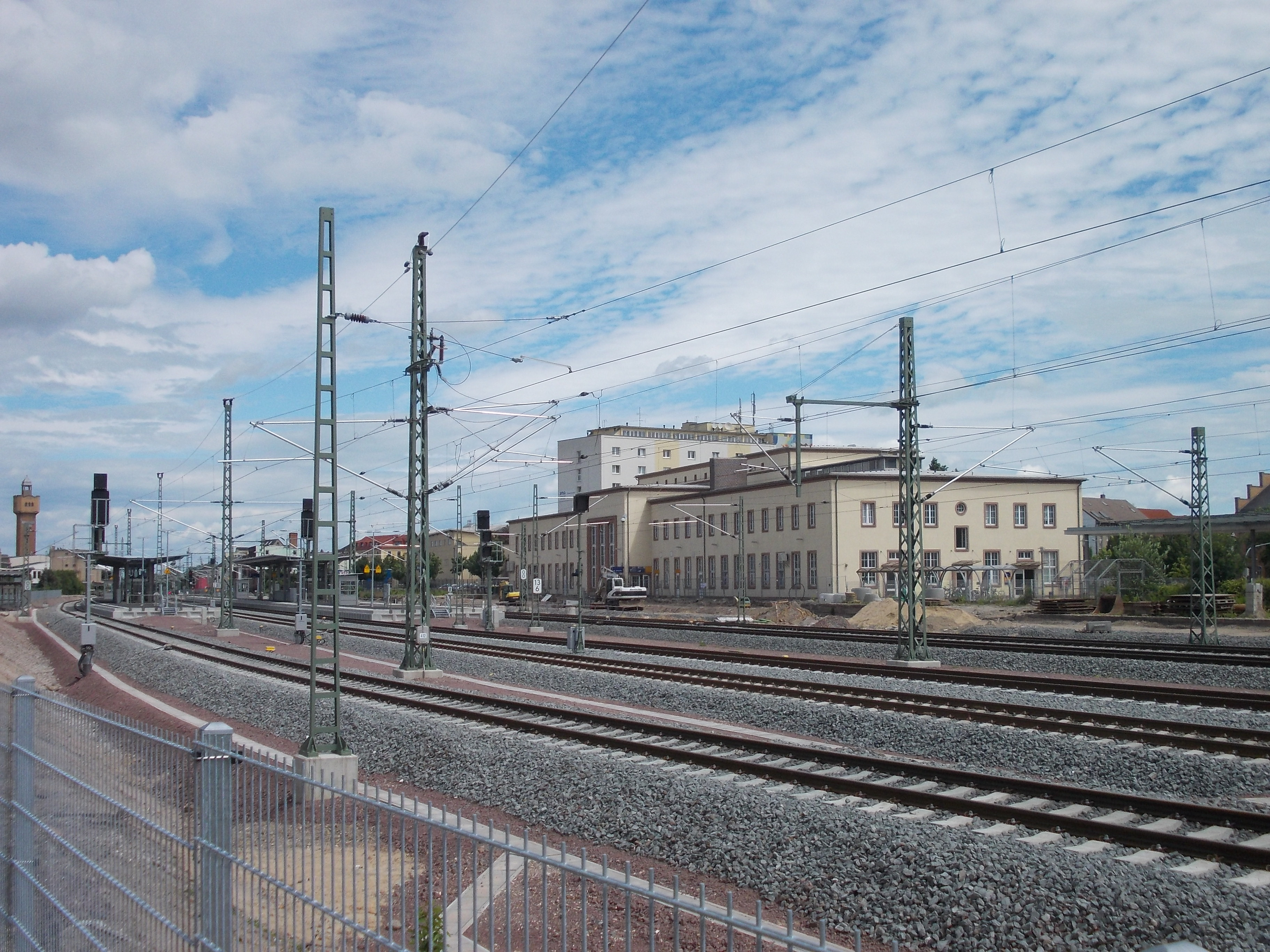
Merseburg station

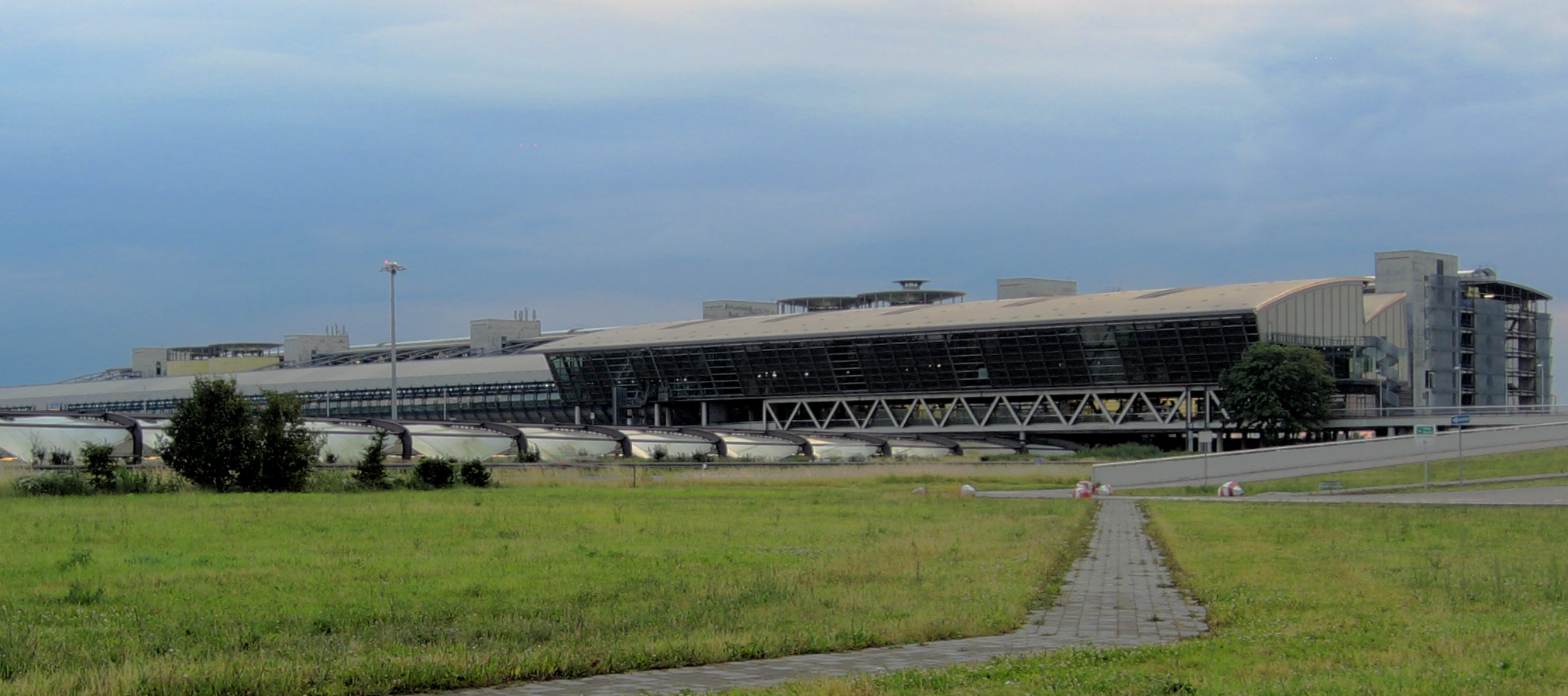
Leipzig/Halle Airport, 25 kilometres away from Merseburg

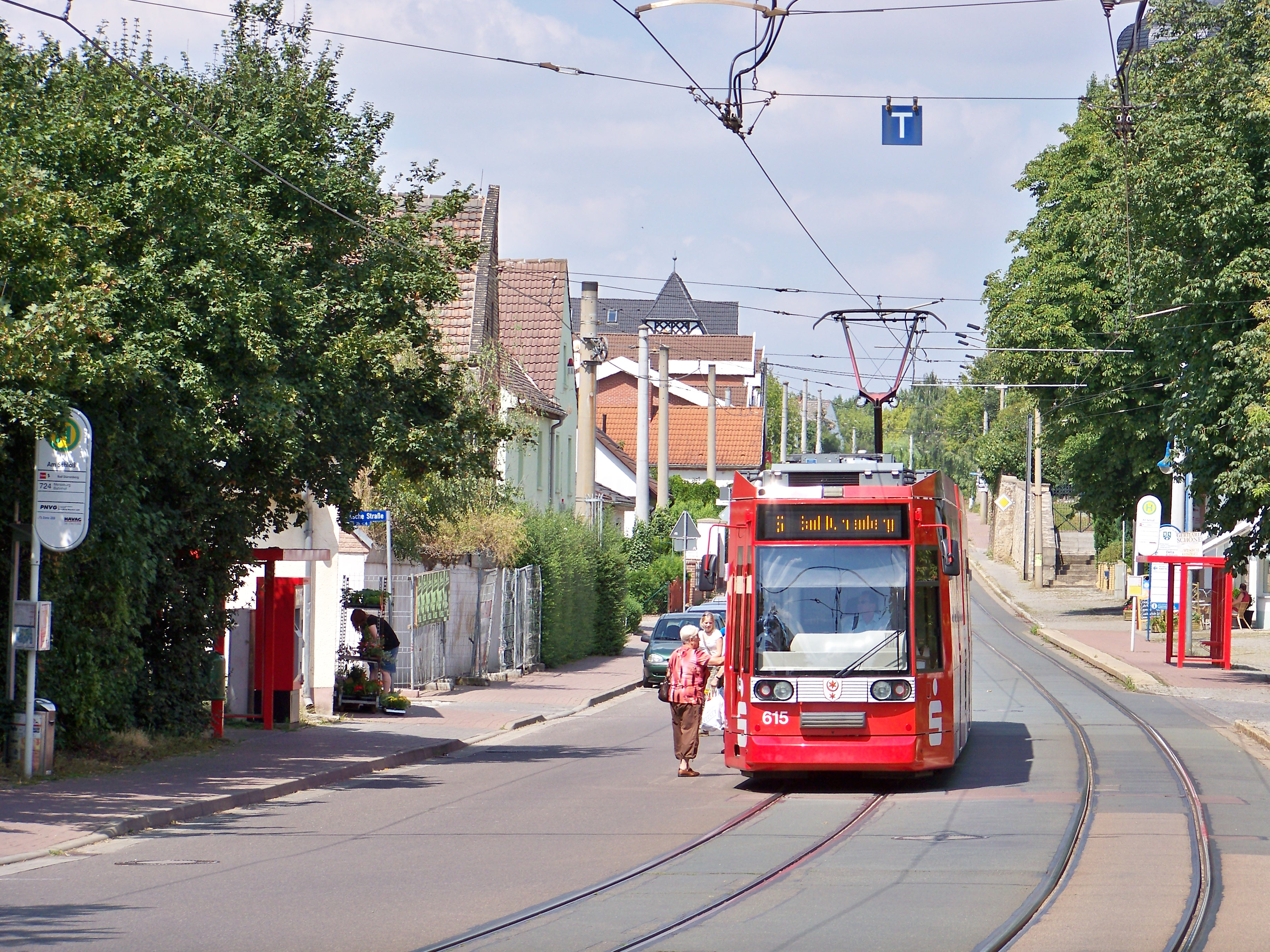
Tram in Schkopau, near Merseburg

== Twin towns – sister cities ==
Merseburg is twinned with:

- Châtillon, France
- Genzano di Roma, Italy
- Bottrop, Germany

== Notable people ==
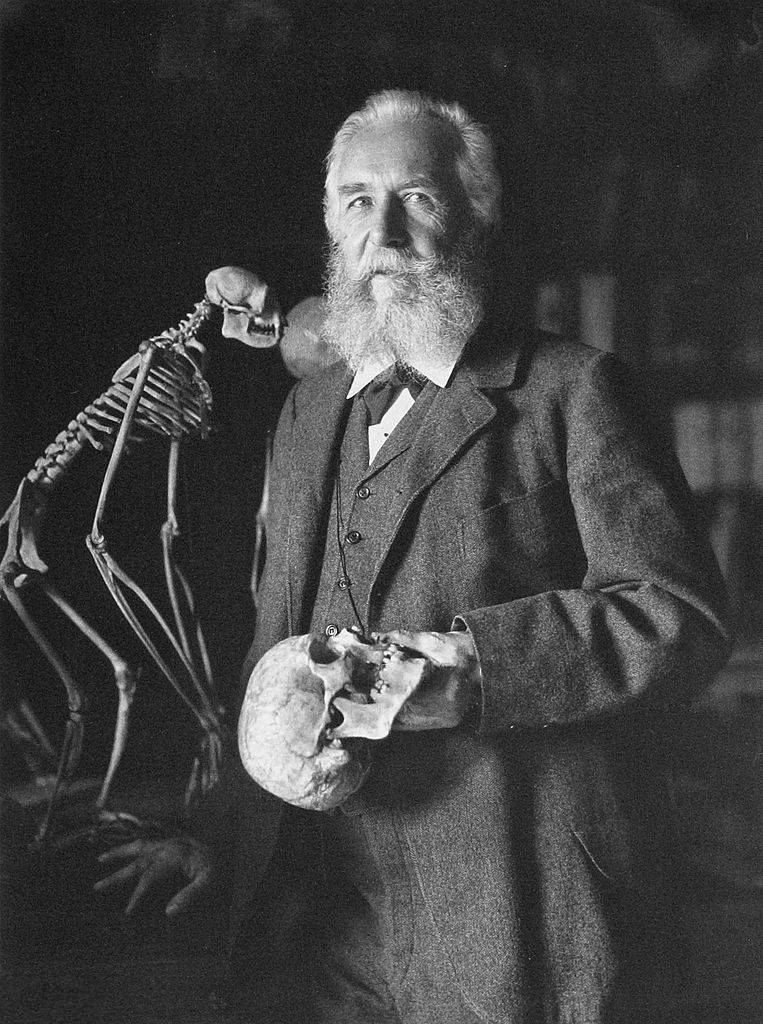
Ernst Haeckel in 1906

- Thietmar of Merseburg (975–1018), bishop and chronist
- Menahem of Merseburg (first half of 15th century), rabbi and author
- Johannes Knolleisen (1450–1513), theological professor
- Szymon Bogumił Zug (1733–1807), Polish-German architect and designer of gardens
- Karl Adolph von Basedow (1799–1854), physician
- Ernst Haeckel (1834–1919), biologist, philosopher, physician
- Lucian Müller (1836–1898), classical scholar
- Oskar Herrfurth (1862-1934), painter and illustrator
- Elisabeth Schumann (1888–1952), operatic soprano
- Klaus Tennstedt (1926–1998), conductor
- Uwe Nolte (born 1969), poet, musician and graphic artist
- Jawed Karim (born 1979), American software engineer, YouTube co-founder, creator of the first video uploaded to YouTube "Me at the zoo"
- Dave Grunewald (born 1986), metalcore singer for Annisokay (2011-2019), fitness expert, and podcaster
