= Geusa =

- Ortschaft of Merseburg
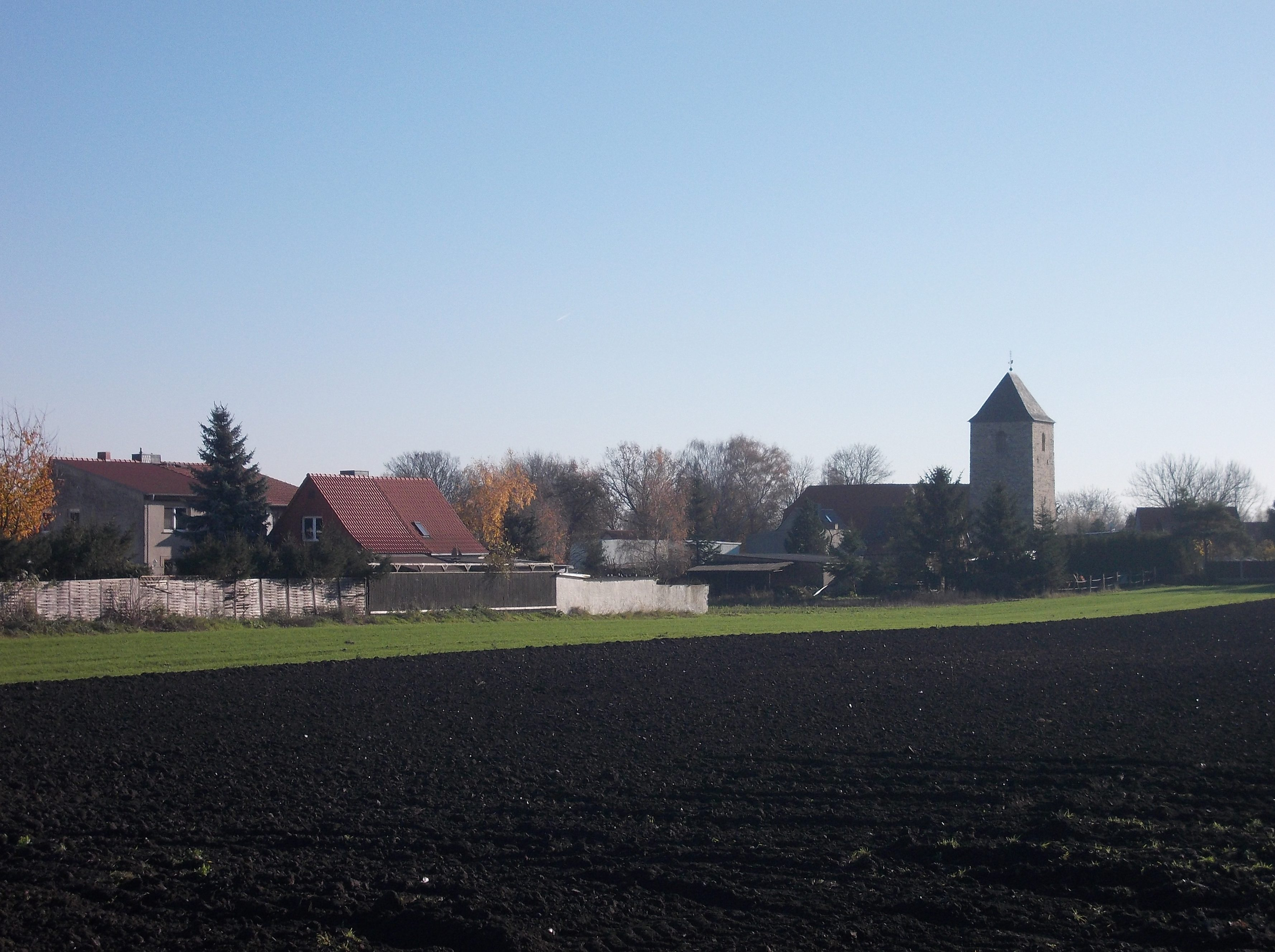
- Geusa from the North West
- Interactive map of Geusa
- Location within Germany Location within Saxony-Anhalt
- Coordinates: 51°20′18″N 11°56′22″E
- Country: Germany
- State: Saxony-Anhalt
- District: Saalekreis
- Town: Merseburg

Area
  - Total: 12.63 km^{2} (4.88 sq mi)
- Elevation: 99 m (325 ft)

Population (2006-12-31)
  - Total: 1,488
  - Density: 117.8/km^{2} (305.1/sq mi)
- Time zone: UTC+01:00 (CET)
  - Summer (DST): UTC+02:00 (CEST)
- Postal codes: 06217
- Dialling codes: 03461

Geusa is a village and a former municipality within the district Saalekreis, in the federal state of Saxony-Anhalt, Germany. Since January 1, 2010, it is within the town limits of Merseburg.

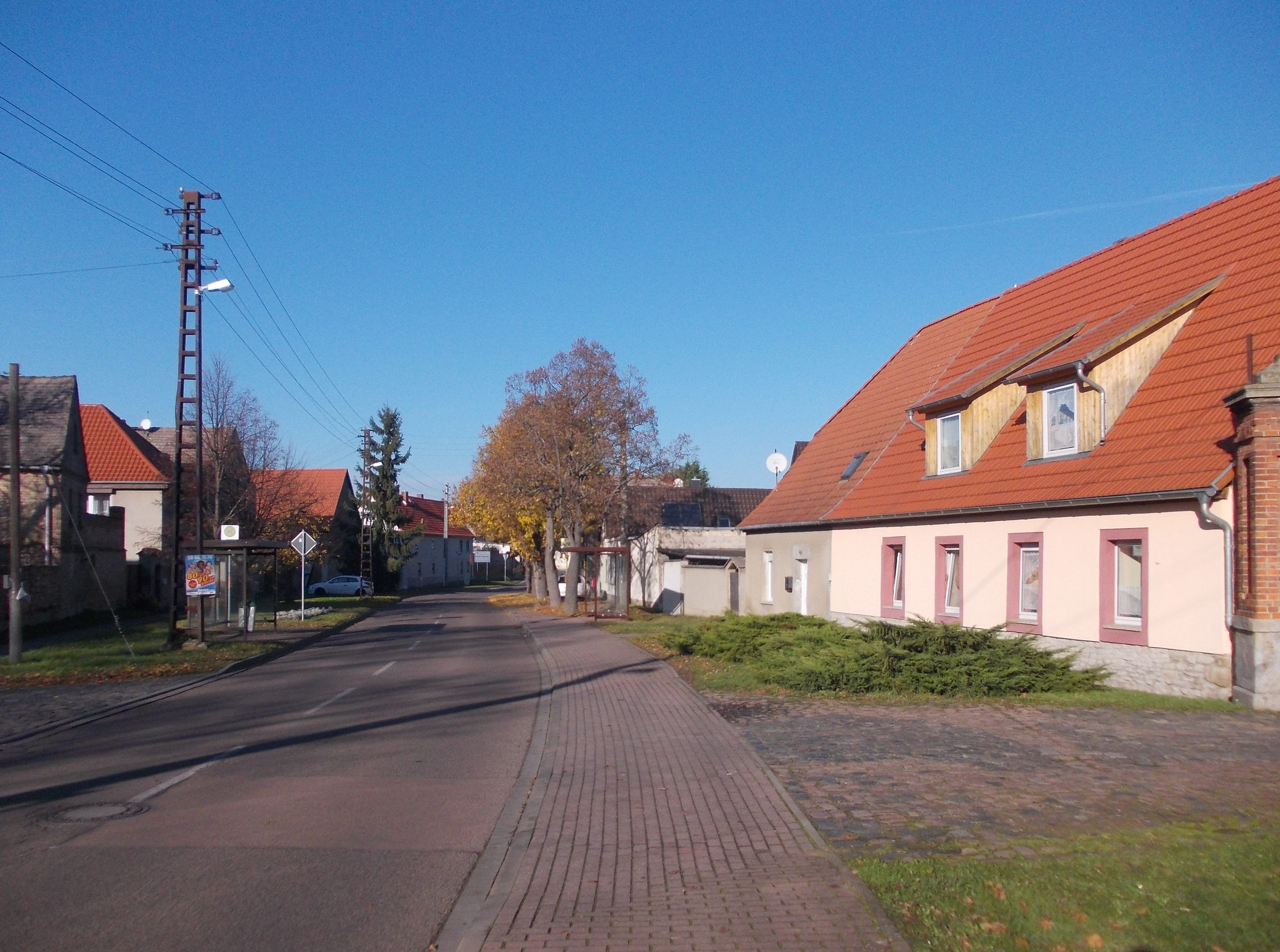
Geusa village street

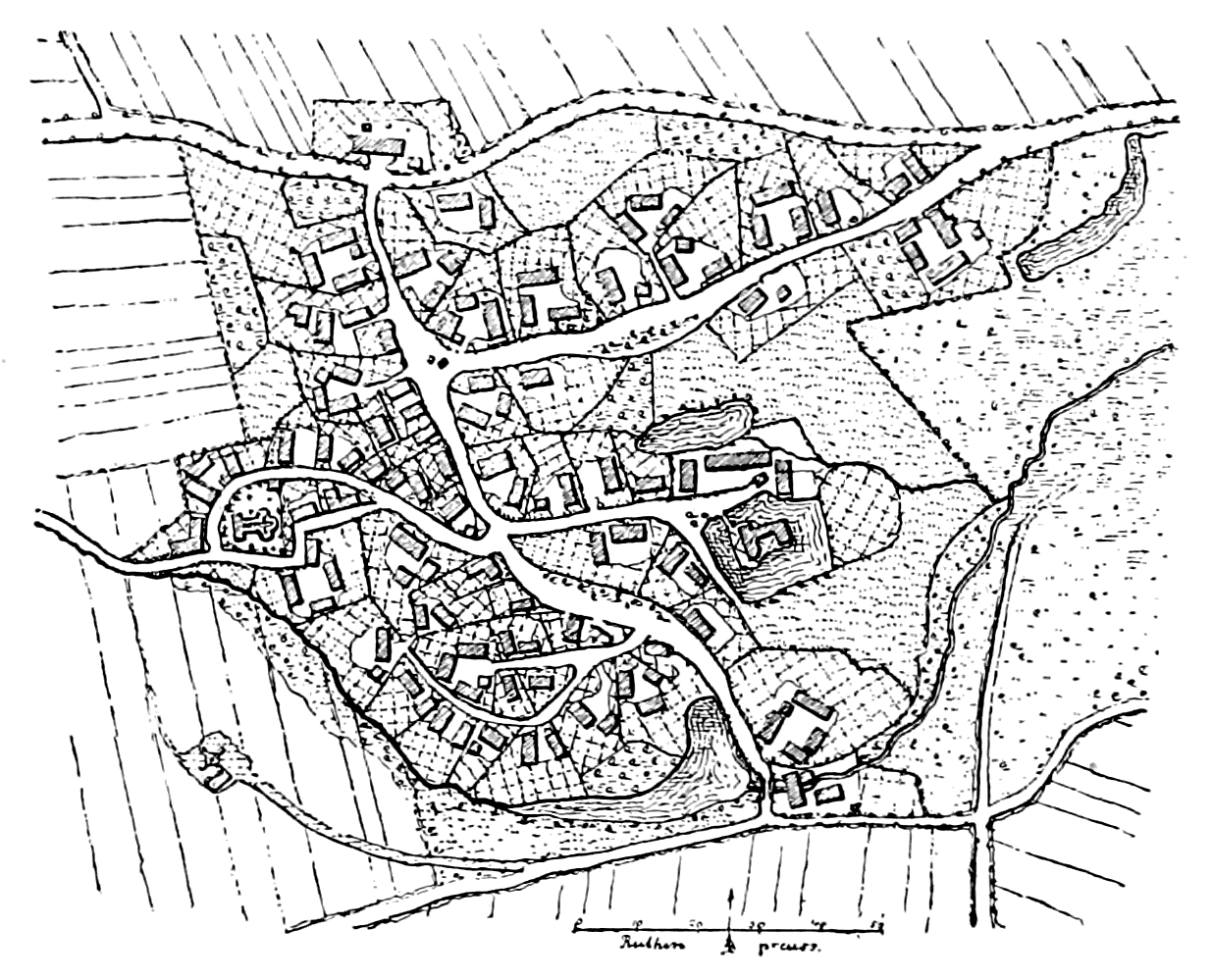
Map from 1897

== Geography ==
Geusa is approximately 5 kilometres west of Merseburg. The Geiseltalsee is found to the south-west. The A38 goes through the neighborhood.

== History ==
The village of Geusa was mentioned as early as 880/890 in the Hersfeld Tithe Register (German:Hersfelder Zehntverzeichnis) as Husuw(n)a, or Husiuwa. Additional nobility maps dating back to 1000 C.E. have the town marked as Geußau, Geißau, Geusau, and Geußen. It appears as Gusau in an August 9, 975 entry in the Pago Hassaga, a record of noble land holdings for the region during the reign of Otto II. The town appears as "Geuse" in Willem Blaeu's 1645 edition of Atlas Novus in the map of Mansfeld Land entitled Mansfeldia Commitatus.

== Origin of name ==
The von Geusau family of Geusa maintains that the name derives from the Latin gans for "goose." However, while this cannot be ruled out, no salient documents exist to support this claim. It is equally probable that the name Geusa shares its origin with the Geisel River Valley, but since both names date back to the days of the Carolingian Empire, the original spelling and etymology have been lost. There are several equally valid possibilities:

=== Proto-Germanic origin ===
Due to its age, the name is likely related to the Proto-Germanic root hūsą, meaning "house" or "home." The first documented mention of the village was in a tithing document created between 881 and 899 in Hersfeld Abbey where the place name was listed as Husuuua in the district of Friesenfeld. This is likely to mean House by the meadow.

=== Old High German origin ===
The name may also derive from Old High German gewi, (from the Gothic gavi, (neuter) or gaujis (genitive)), a medieval term for a region within a country, often a former or actual province. Another possibility is it come from the OHG gīsl or gīsal meaning "hostage."
