= Dance organ =

Mechanical organ used in a dance hall or ballroom

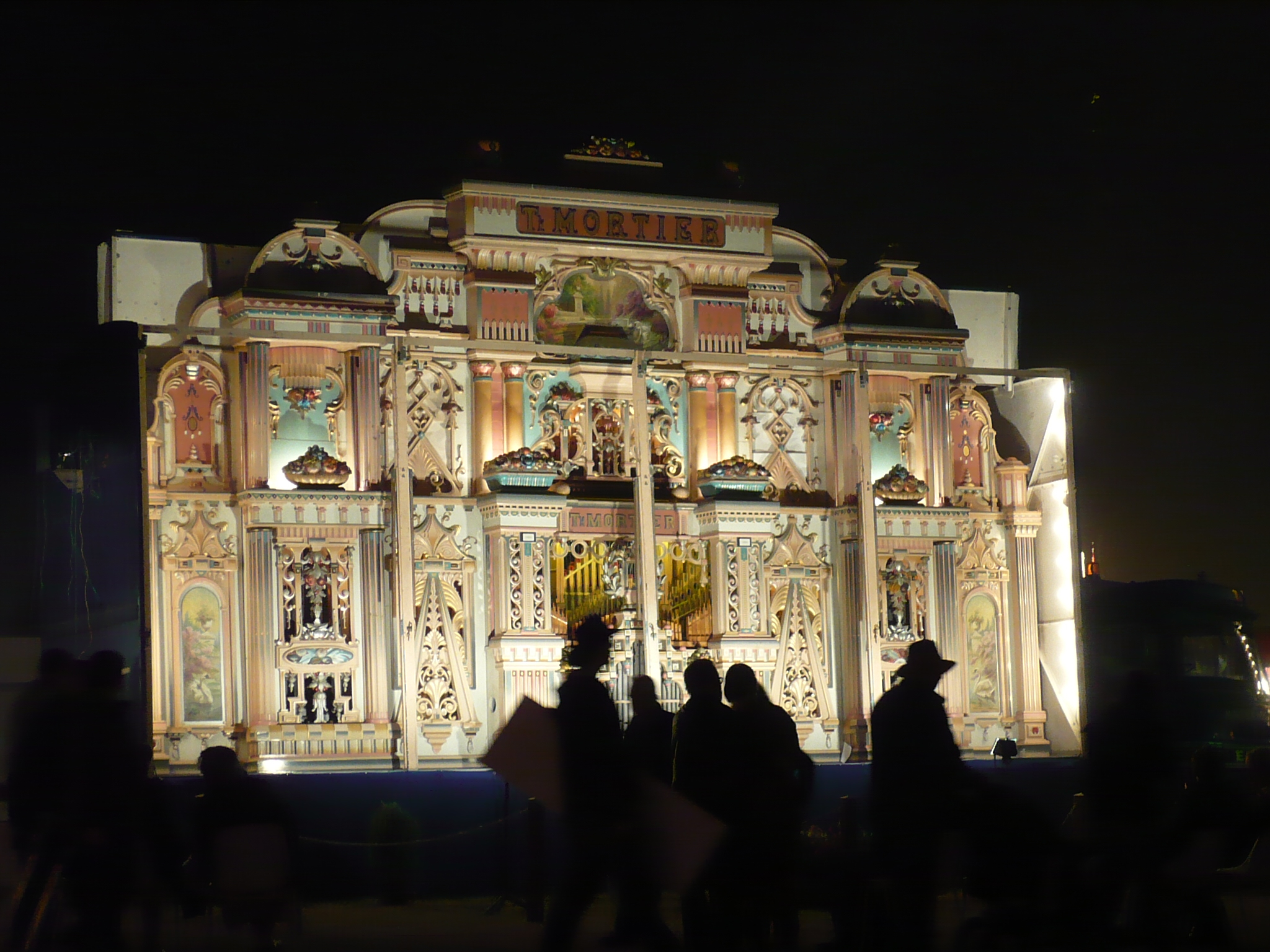
A Mortier dance hall organ at the Great Dorset Steam Fair

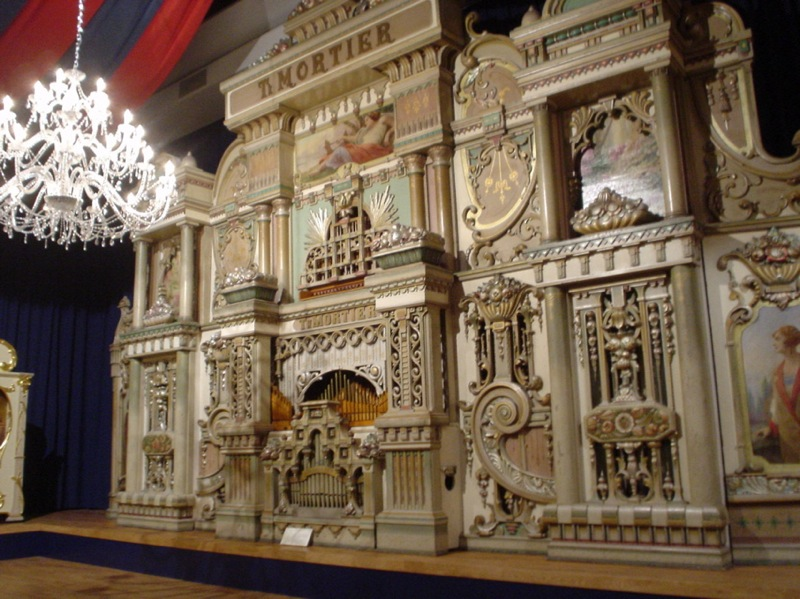
At Museum Speelklok in Utrecht

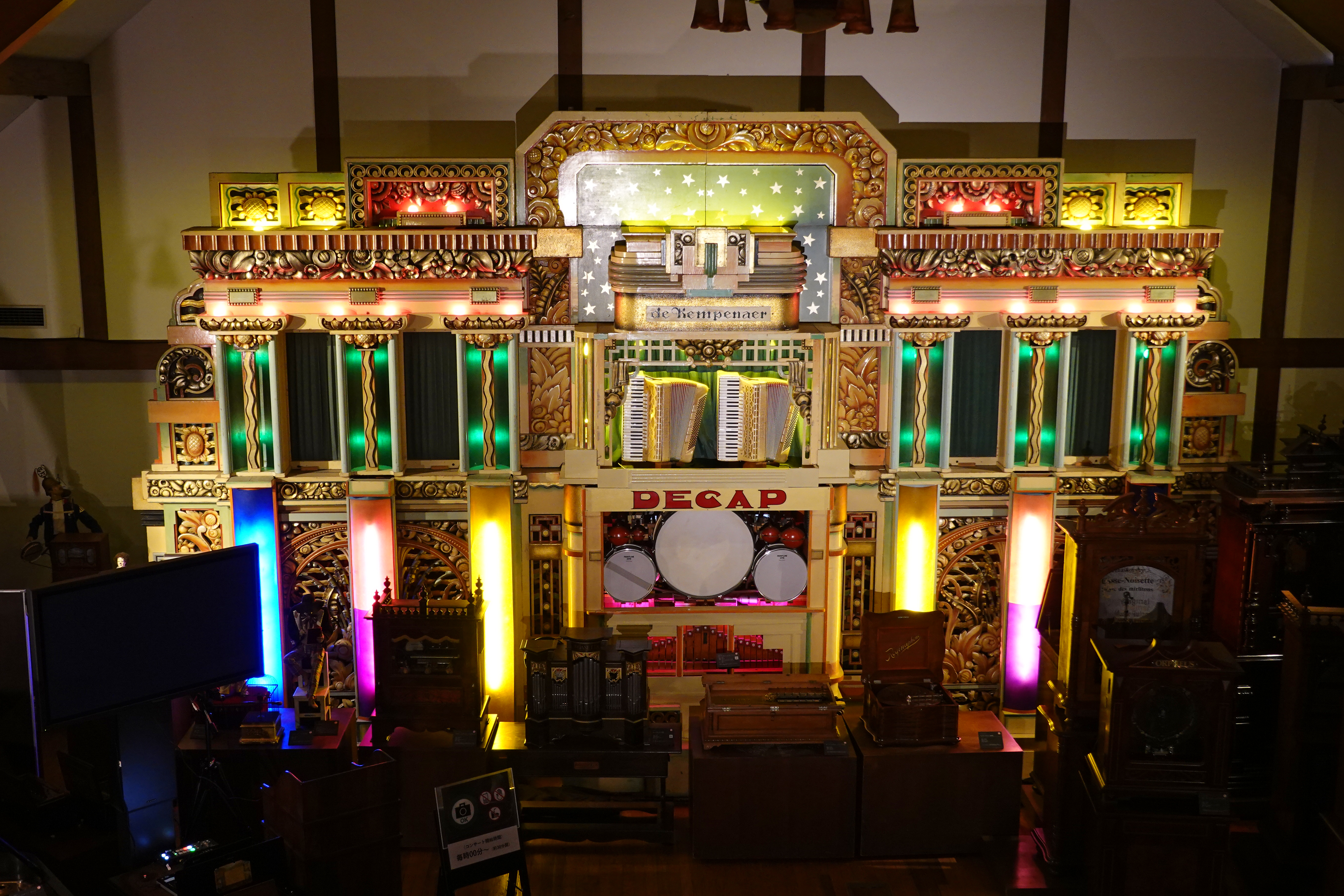
Decap Dance Organ "De Kempenaer" (1938 Made by Belgian Decap) on Rokko Forest Sound Museum in Kobe, Japan

A dance organ (French: Orgue de danse) is a mechanical organ designed to be used in a dance hall or ballroom. Originated and popularized in Paris, it is intended for use indoors as dance organs tend to be quieter than the similar fairground organ.

== History ==
Dance organs were principally used in mainland Europe. In their earliest days before the First World War they were used in France, Spain, Belgium and the Netherlands. After the First World War their use waned apart from in Belgium and the Netherlands, where they became a mainstream form of music at public venues until the Second World War.

The dance organ came into its own during the early 1900s, with many large instruments built by Gavioli and Marenghi. In the early 1910s the firm of Mortier began expanding out the sound schemes of these instruments with a variety of novel pipework and percussion adapted to the new emerging styles of early 20th century popular music. Other manufacturers such as Hooghuys and Fasano followed suit. Many instruments with older style sound schemes from Gavioli and Marenghi were modernized by Mortier and others either partially or entirely.

In Antwerp, Arthur Bursens built several hundred small roll and book-operated café orchestrions under the trade names "Ideal" and "Arburo" (a combination of Arthur Bursens and (Gustav) Roels). Roels was an early business partner, later succeeded by Frans de Groof. Bursens primarily catered to the smaller cafés in the Antwerp area, which often lacked the space or income to justify a larger Mortier or Decap dance organ. Patrons would drop a coin into a wallbox, allowing one tune from a roll that typically contained three or four tunes to play. At the end of the tune, the roll would rewind, ready to play from the beginning again. To meet the demand for the latest popular hits, multi-tune rolls were frequently produced.

By the early 1920s Mortier were the predominant brand closely followed by Gaudin of Paris - successors to Marenghi. Throughout the 1920s the sound-schemes of the instruments constantly evolved to keep up with the trends of jazz-age dance music. Facade styles also followed the fashions of the era moving progressing naturally from the Art Nouveau towards the Art Deco of the 1920s and 1930s.

In the 1930s the dominance of Mortier was matched by the instruments from the firm of Gebroeders Decap Antwerpen (Dutch for Decap Brothers Antwerp). By the end of the 1930s both Mortier and Decap had reached their zenith both in art-deco facade design and musical abilities. Dance organs came in every size. More compact versions were used in cafes and smaller public venues where they bridged the gap between orchestrions and the giant dance organs. Just like many cafe coin pianos and orchestrions some of the smaller instruments were set up so that they could be coin-operated remotely.

After the Second World War Decap Herentals and Decap Antwerp made further developments to include use of the latest technology and instrumentation ideas. Hammond organ tone generators were incorporated following the trend of popular music into electronic instruments and creating a partial replacement for tone generation via conventional pipework.

In the 21st century dance organs are still being built by a small number of manufacturers. Modern technology in all its varied forms is frequently adapted with the result than many new instruments are wi-fi and midi operable and tones electronically generated to modern standards, have percussion with dynamic playing capability, karaoke systems, volume control and other improvements.

== Instrumentation ==
The dance organ developed to closely follow the new emerging styles of popular music. The earliest organs musically aim to replicate and replace a small dance orchestra playing musical styles of the late 1800s—early 1900s and the sounds of the bal-musette. The musical rhythms are mainly the older formal dances such as waltz, two-step, polka etc. During these early years the instruments were, in addition to loud performance, capable of soft solo playing with distinct solo pipework voices coupled with swell shutters in order to handle the characteristic gentle ballroom dances of the early 1900s such as the valse tres-lente, the valse boston (or Cross-step waltz) and the Hesitation waltz styles.

By the 1910s the harmonic complexity of popular music has started to move away from the 19th century model. With the development of the foxtrot and one-step during the mid-1910s dance organs adapted with provision for greater musical chromaticism to provide higher degrees of musical flexibility.

In the late 1910s with the emergence of jazz there grew a need for more complex percussion and this was mirrored with organs acquiring xylophones and extended jazz percussion.

The jazz music of the '20s was based predominantly around brass instruments and the saxophone and its variants in particular. At this point the dance organ acquired many new novel pipework generated sounds of its own. The structure of bands moved to the big band format and dance organ capabilities and musical arrangements followed accordingly.

In the 1930s the natural progress continued with further extended percussion to cope with the trends for Latin American rumba and other new rhythms in popular music. After the Second World War the developments already made with regard to percussion capabilities were adequate for the various post Second World War Latin dance rhythms such as the mambo and cha-cha-cha.

With rhythm being an important part of any dance, dance organs generally have many more percussion instruments than other types of mechanical organs. For visual effect in addition to the facade itself there are often complex lighting effects. Some instruments have further visual interest provided by displaying automatically operated accordions, visible percussion and occasionally dummy saxophones rigged so that they appear to be playing, but actually the sax sound is made by a rank of reed pipes within the pipework case.

The pinnacle of the organ builder's craft was exemplified by organs such as the robot band of which seven were built by Decap of Antwerp in the early 1950s. Built in Decap's trademark art deco style, each organ featured three highly articulated robots, one of which played percussion, one played a saxophone and the last played a conceptualised and flattened brass instrument. Unlike many dance organs, Robot organs usually used a hidden hammond organ played mechanically, rather than musical pipes, for most of the melodic line. A visible accordion is also played mechanically, sometimes by one of the robots. The robot drummer turned to align his drumsticks with snare drums, cymbal or tempo block as required, his foot playing a hi-hat. The other two robots, normally seated, would stand when they were required to perform. Their shoulders would rise and fall and their cheeks would puff out as they played to emulate blowing into their instrument. In addition, the wind players would tap a foot in time to the beat of the music. As a piece de resistance, the two wind players also take a bow at the end of a music roll.

The principal chronology of manufacturers of dance organs is essentially: Gavioli (Paris), Marenghi (Paris), Mortier (Antwerp), Hooghuys (Grammont), Fasano (Antwerp), Decap (Antwerp) and Bursens (Hoboken, Antwerp)

== See also ==
- Organ (music)
- Barrel Organ Museum Haarlem, Netherlands
- Barrel organ
- Fairground organ
- Street organ
- Organ grinder
- Mortier
