= Mortier =

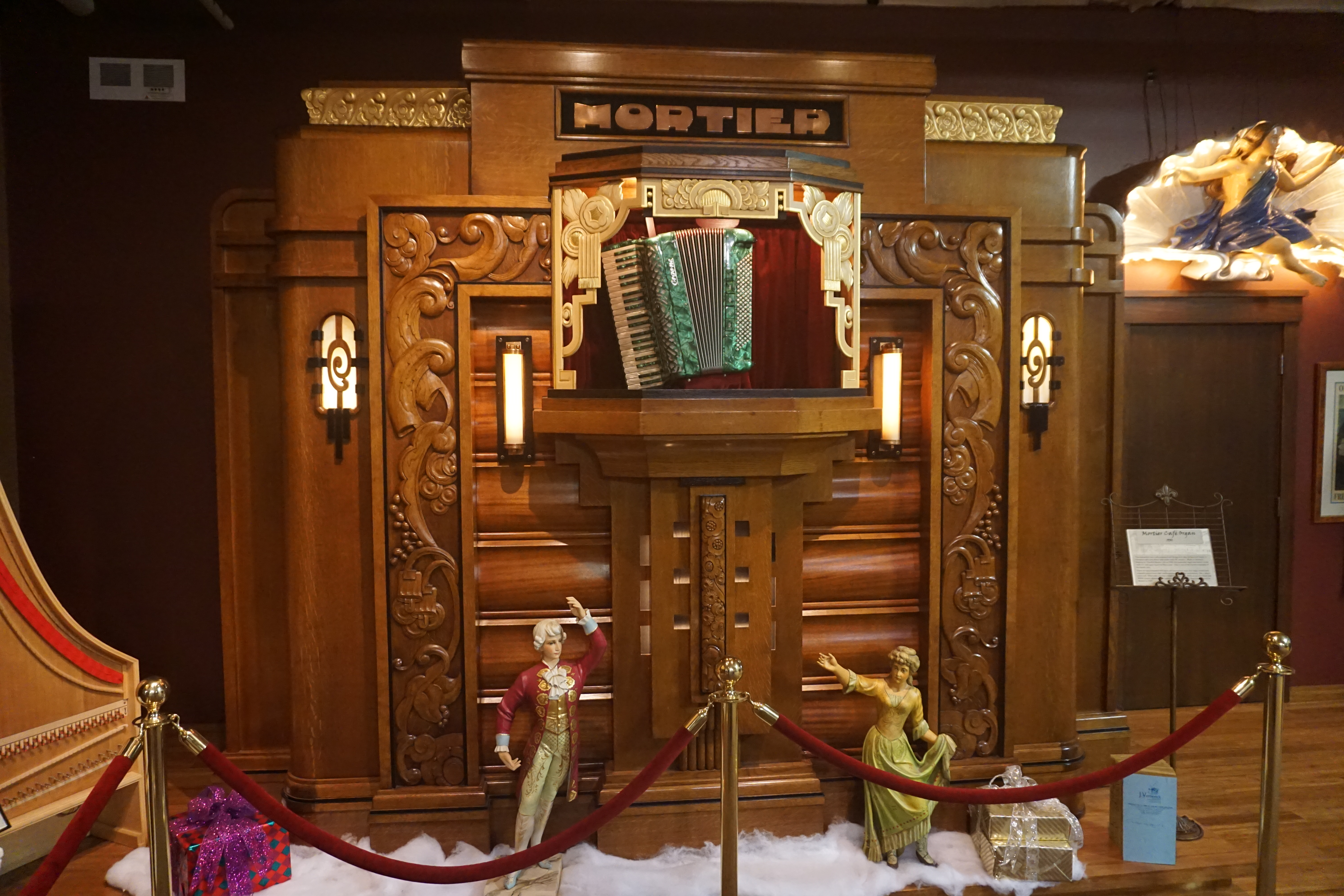
Mortier Café Organ at Stahls Automotive Collection

Mortier was an organ manufacturer from Antwerp, Belgium that made dance organs and orchestrions.

== History ==
The company was founded by Theophile Mortier (1855–1944). Mortier started in 1898 as a vending agent for the Parisian organ builder Gavioli & Cie, in a period when the French and German organ industry was in full bloom. Theophile Mortier was originally the manager of a dance hall, in which there was always a Gavioli organ playing. He made it a habit to sell the installed organ after a short while. He was fortunate enough most of the time to make a profit on selling these used organs. As time went by he became more and more an organ dealer and a very good customer of Gavioli. He set up a repair shop in order to provide maintenance and repair for the organs, which he had sold. The organ builder Guillaume Bax managed this shop. In 1906 Mortier started to build organs himself, as an annex of the Gavioli company.

Due to internal operations difficulties, Gavioli could after a while not deliver enough orders and Mortier began to manufacture the dance organs under his own name. After the First World War the company expanded to a size where they employed 80 personnel and had a capacity to build about 20 large dance organs per year. No other manufacturer has matched the cubic meter volume of organs produced by Mortier. The company stayed active until 1948.

== See also ==
- Museum Speelklok, Utrecht
- National Heritage Museum, Arnhem
- Pipe organ
