= Waltz =

Ballroom and folk dance

- A phenakistoscope animation by Eadweard Muybridge demonstrating the waltz
- Genre: Ballroom dance
- Time signature: 3/4
- Year: 17th century

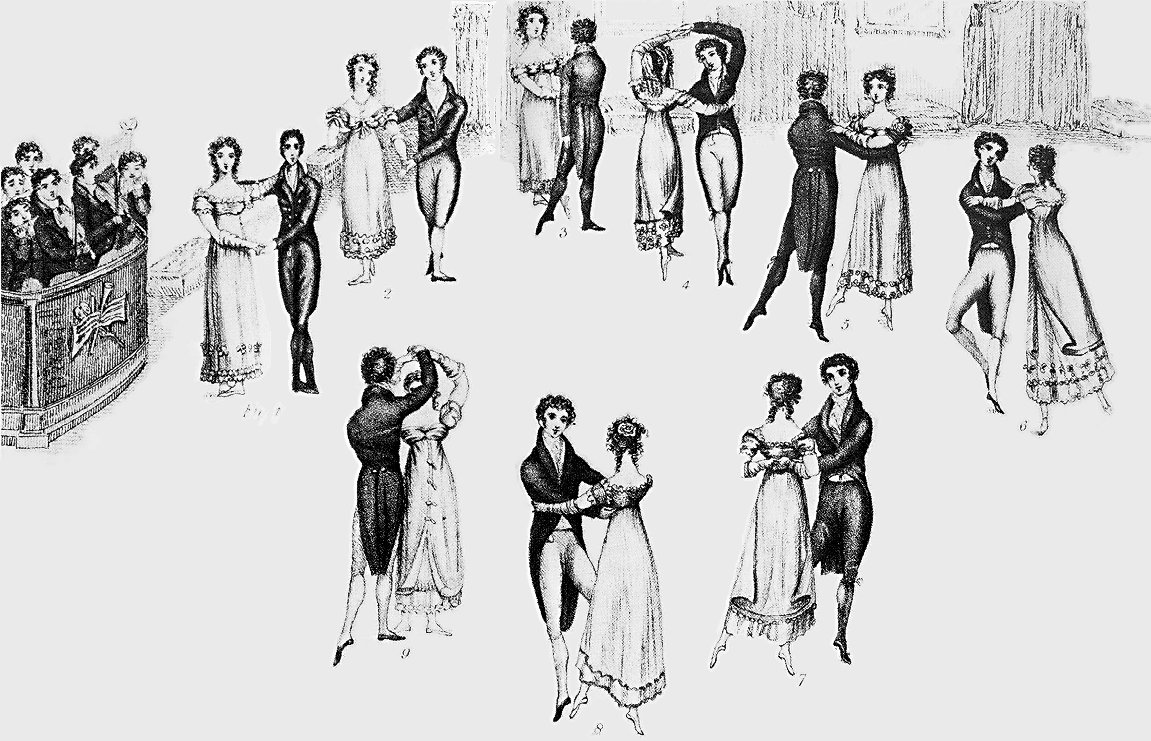
Detail from frontispiece to Thomas Wilson Correct Method of German and French Waltzing (1816), showing nine positions of the waltz, clockwise from the left (the musicians are at far left). At that time, the waltz was a relatively new dance in England, and the fact that it was a couples dance (as opposed to the traditional group dances), and that the gentleman clasped his arm around the lady's waist, gave it a dubious moral status.

The waltz (From German: Walzer [ˈvaltsɐ], meaning 'to roll or revolve') is a ballroom and folk dance, in triple ( 3/4 ) time, performed primarily in closed position, originating from German-speaking regions of Europe in the 18th century. Along with the ländler and allemande, the waltz was sometimes referred to by the generic term German Dance in publications during the late 18th and early 19th centuries.

== History ==
Waltz

There are many references to a sliding or gliding dance, including the volta, that would evolve into the waltz that date from 16th-century Europe, including the representations of the printmaker Hans Sebald Beham. The French philosopher Michel de Montaigne wrote of a dance he saw in 1580 in Augsburg, where the dancers held each other so closely that their faces touched. Kunz Haas (of approximately the same period) wrote, "Now they are dancing the godless Weller or Spinner." "The vigorous peasant dancer, following an instinctive knowledge of the weight of fall, uses his surplus energy to press all his strength into the proper beat of the bar, thus intensifying his personal enjoyment in dancing." Around 1750, the lower classes in the regions of Bavaria, Tyrol, and Styria began dancing a couples dance called Walzer. The Ländler, also known as the Schleifer, a country dance in 3/4 time, was popular in Bohemia, Austria, and Bavaria, and spread from the countryside to the suburbs of the city. While the eighteenth-century upper classes continued to dance the minuets (such as those by Mozart, Haydn and Handel), bored noblemen slipped away to the balls of their servants.

In the 1771 German novel Geschichte des Fräuleins von Sternheim by Sophie von La Roche, a high-minded character complains about the newly introduced waltz among aristocrats thus: "But when he put his arm around her, pressed her to his breast, cavorted with her in the shameless, indecent whirling-dance of the Germans and engaged in a familiarity that broke all the bounds of good breeding—then my silent misery turned into burning rage."

Describing life in Vienna (dated at either 1776 or 1786), Don Curzio wrote, "The people were dancing mad ... The ladies of Vienna are particularly celebrated for their grace and movements of waltzing of which they never tire." There is a waltz in the second act finale of the 1786 opera Una Cosa Rara by Martin y Soler. Soler's waltz was marked andante con moto, or "at a walking pace with motion", but the flow of the dance was sped-up in Vienna leading to the Geschwindwalzer, and the Galloppwalzer.

In the 19th century, the word primarily indicated that the dance was a turning one; one would "waltz" in the polka to indicate rotating rather than going straight forward without turning.

Shocking many when it was first introduced, the waltz became fashionable in Vienna around the 1780s, spreading to many other countries in the years to follow. According to contemporary singer Michael Kelly, it reached England in 1791. During the Napoleonic Wars, infantry soldiers of the King's German Legion introduced the dance to the people of Bexhill, Sussex, from 1804.

It became fashionable in Britain during the Regency period, having been made respectable by the endorsement of Dorothea Lieven, wife of the Russian ambassador. Diarist Thomas Raikes later recounted that "No event ever produced so great a sensation in English society as the introduction of the waltz in 1813." In the same year, a sardonic tribute to the dance by Lord Byron was anonymously published (written the previous autumn). Influential dance master and author of instruction manuals, Thomas Wilson published A Description of the Correct Method of Waltzing in 1816. Almack's, the most exclusive club in London, permitted the waltz, though the entry in the Oxford English Dictionary shows that it was considered "riotous and indecent" as late as 1825. In The Tenant of Wildfell Hall, by Anne Brontë, in a scene set in 1827, the local vicar Reverend Milward tolerates quadrilles and country dances but intervenes decisively when a waltz is called for, declaring "No, no, I don't allow that! Come, it's time to be going home."

The waltz, especially its closed position, became the example for the creation of many other ballroom dances. Subsequently, new types of waltz have developed, including many folk and several ballroom dances.

== Variants ==
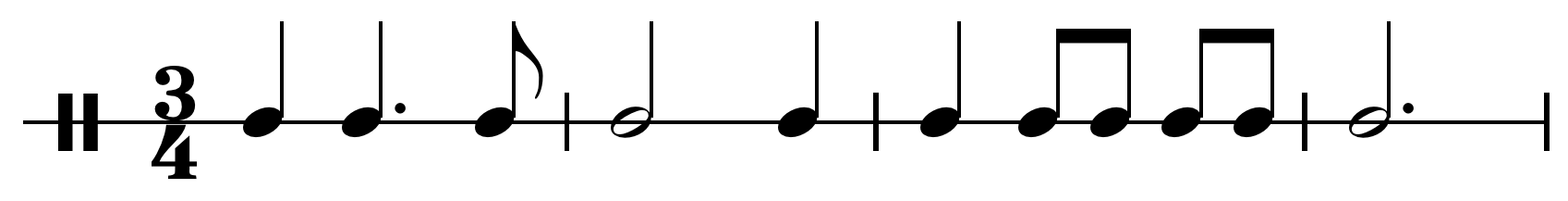
Waltz rhythm

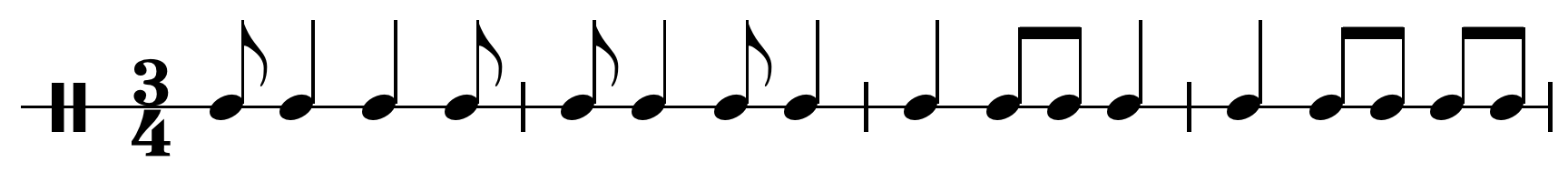
Jazz waltz rhythm

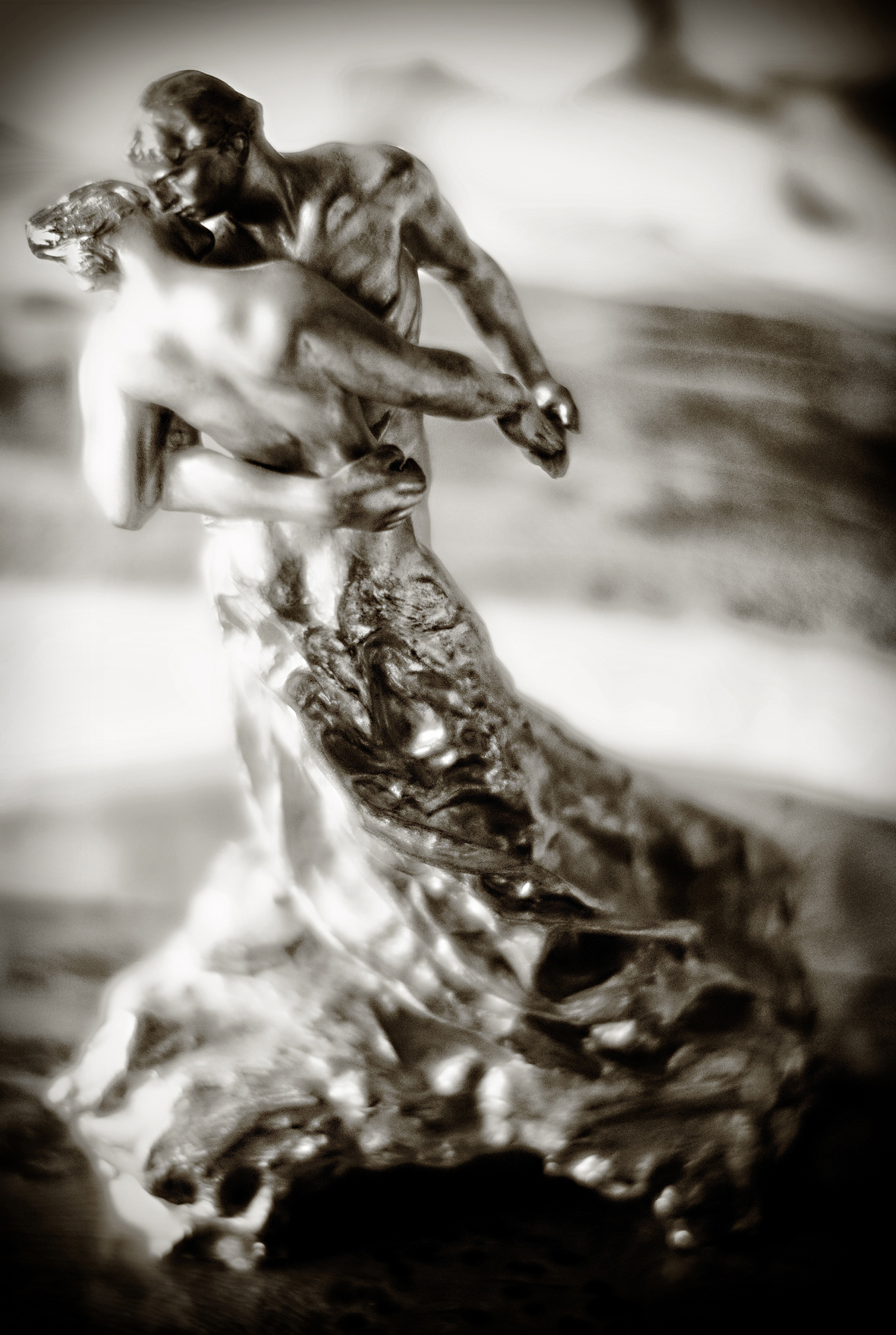
The Waltz, by Camille Claudel (cast in 1905)

A waltz following a contra dance in Massachusetts, U.S.

In the 19th and early 20th century, numerous different waltz forms existed, including versions performed in 3/4, 3/8 or 6/8 (sauteuse), and 5/4 time (5/4 waltz, half and half).

In the 1910s, a form called the Hesitation Waltz was introduced by Vernon and Irene Castle. It incorporated "hesitations" and was danced to fast music. A hesitation is basically a halt on the standing foot during the full waltz bar, with the moving foot suspended in the air or slowly dragged. Similar figures (Hesitation Change, Drag Hesitation, and Cross Hesitation) are incorporated in the International Standard Waltz Syllabus.

The Country Western Waltz is mostly progressive, moving counterclockwise around the dance floor. Both the posture and frame are relaxed, with posture bordering on a slouch. The exaggerated hand and arm gestures of some ballroom styles are not part of this style. Couples may frequently dance in the promenade position, depending on local preferences. Within Country Western waltz, there is the Spanish Waltz and the more modern (for the late 1930s- early 1950s) Pursuit Waltz. At one time it was considered ill treatment for a man to make the woman walk backward in some locations.

In California, the waltz was banned by Mission priests until 1834 because of the "closed" dance position. Thereafter a Spanish Waltz was danced. This Spanish Waltz was a combination of dancing around the room in closed position, and a "formation" dance of two couples facing each other and performing a sequence of steps. "Valse a Trois Temps" was the "earliest" waltz step, and the Rye Waltz was preferred as a couple dance.

- In contemporary ballroom dance, the fast versions of the waltz are called Viennese waltz as opposed to the Slow waltz.
- In traditional Irish music, the waltz was taught by travelling dancing masters to those who could afford their lessons during the 19th century. By the end of that century, the dance spread to the middle and lower classes of Irish society and traditional triple-tune tunes and songs were altered to fit the waltz rhythm. During the 20th century, the waltz found a distinctively Irish playing style in the hands of Céilidh musicians at dances.
- International Standard Waltz has only closed figures; that is, the couple never breaks the embrace.
- The American Style Waltz, part of the American Smooth ballroom dance syllabus, in contrast to the International Standard Waltz, involves breaking contact almost entirely in some figures. For example, the Syncopated Side-by-Side with Spin includes a free spin for both partners. Open rolls are another good example of an open dance figure, in which the follower alternates between the lead's left and right sides, with the lead's left or right arm (alone) providing the lead. Waltzes were the staple of many American musicals and films, including "Waltz in Swing Time" sung by Fred Astaire.
- The Valse Musette, a form of waltz popular in France, started in the late 19th century.
- The cross-step waltz (French Valse Boston) developed in France in the early 20th century and is popular in social waltz groups today.
- In folk dance from the Alsace region, waltzes in odd metres such as 5/4, 8/4 and 11/4 are found. In modern bal folk, waltzes in even higher metres are played and danced.
- Estonian folk dance Labajalavalss (flat of the foot waltz) performed in 3/4 time.
- Sama'i (also known as usul semai) is a vocal piece of Ottoman Turkish music composed in 6/8 metres. This form and metre (usul in Turkish) is often confused with the completely different Saz Semaisi, an instrumental form consisting of three to four sections, in 10/8-metre, or usul aksak semai (broken semai in Turkish). Semai is one of the most important forms in Ottoman Turkish Sufi music.
- The Tsamikos (Greek: Τσάμικος, Tsamikos) or Kleftikos (Greek: Κλέφτικος) is a popular traditional folk dance of Greece, done to music of 3/4 metre.
