= Cross-step waltz =

Cross-Step Waltz (French Boston)
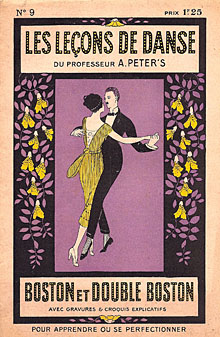
- The evolution of the foxtrot into the French Boston was recorded in dozens of Parisian dance manuals during the 1920s.
- Genre: Social dance, Ballroom dance
- Time signature: 3/4

Cross-step waltz (originally, the French Valse Boston) is a social ballroom dance in triple time, performed primarily in closed position, to slower tempo waltz music (around 110 to 120 beats per minute). It is characterized by a "primary cross-step" where the Lead role crosses the right foot over the left, as the Follow role crosses the left foot over the right, on the first count of the musical measure. Cross-step waltz can travel and rotate like traditional waltzes, while the dynamic of the cross-step facilitates a wide range of traveling variations.

== History ==
Cross-step waltz evolved in the early 20th century. In 1914, the "Cross Walk Boston" waltz created by Frank H. Norman foreshadowed the cross-step waltz. In the Cross Walk Boston, the Lead crossed his left foot over his right, stepped right with his right foot, and closed left to right. This was then repeated with the right foot. There is no indication that Norman's step evolved into the modern cross-step waltz but it is an early example of a cross-step waltz.

Cross-steps in general appeared between 1910 and the 1920s in the American one-step (the Snake Dip), Argentine tango (Cruzada, Ocho) and especially in the foxtrot (the Cross Step). The March 1920 issue of Dancing Times Magazine in London reported that in the foxtrot, "The crossing of the feet is popular and effective." The early foxtrots were in 4/4 time, but some dance manuals, like Geoffrey D'Egville's 1919 How and What to Dance in London suggested that the Cross Step "may be introduced into the Waltz," which essentially turned this foxtrot step into cross-step waltz. In D'Egville's foxtrot version of this step, as in Norman's Cross Walk Boston, the Lead crossed his left foot over his right on the first count of the musical measure. However in the same year, Adèle Collier, also from London, described a similar foxtrot "Cross Step" beginning with the Lead's right foot. Of all the early cross-step dances, this lineage of foxtrot variations is the most likely evolutionary path that became the French Valse Boston and today's cross-step waltz.

After World War I, Americans brought their foxtrot and blues dance steps to Paris, where Parisian dance teachers observed and described the variations. The first descriptions appeared in Parisian dance and music magazines (such as La Baionnette and Musica-Album) in 1919, then in dance manuals beginning in 1920 (for example, Toutes Les Danses Pour Tous and Les 15 Danses Modernes). Significantly, most of these French descriptions commenced the dance steps with the Lead's right foot.

Around 1930, waltz tempos were slowed to a walking tempo, about 110-120 bpm, allowing the French crossed-step foxtrot to become a form of waltz, called Valse Boston, which was identical to today's cross-step waltz. At the same time, ballroom dancers in England and the United States developed their own slow waltz variations, but commencing with the Lead's left foot. This gave the cross-step (the "Twinkle" in American slow waltz) a different musical dynamic and momentum from the French Valse Boston, which began with the Lead's right foot.

Cross-step waltz was demonstrated in the 1944 American Lindy hop film "Groovie Movie," with the Lead's right foot crossing on the musical downbeat.

The French Valse Boston has partially faded away, although it can still be seen today in southern France and occasionally in Paris. It was revived in the United States around 1994, developed into a social dance form with hundreds of variations, and renamed cross-step waltz. Cross-step waltz has been spreading in the 21st century, is now popular at more than thirty mostly-waltz dance groups across the United States, and has recently become widespread in outdoor parks in Beijing.
