= Markus Becker =

German pianist (born 1963)

- Born: 13 May 1963 (age 62); Osnabrück, Lower Saxony, West Germany
- Education: Musikhochschule Hannover
- Occupations: Classical pianist; Jazz pianist; Academic teacher
- Organizations: Hochschule für Musik, Theater und Medien Hannover
- Website: Official website

Markus Becker (born 13 May 1963) is a German pianist and academic teacher. He is focused on chamber music, and on piano concertos from the time around 1900. His recording of the complete piano works by Max Reger earned him awards. He is also a jazz pianist, and has been professor of piano and chamber music at the Hochschule für Musik, Theater und Medien Hannover since 1993.

== Career ==
Becker was born in Osnabrück, the son of Peter Becker and his wife Bärbel. Both his parents were music educators; his father would become president of the Musikhochschule Hannover. Becker attended school in Hannover, and sang as a member of the Knabenchor Hannover. He studied at the Musikhochschule Hannover with Karl-Heinz Kämmerling. He was appointed professor of piano and chamber music there in 1993.

From the 1990s, Becker became known by performances, recordings and teaching master classes, in Salzburg, Weiden and Leipzig, among others. He recorded the complete piano works by Max Reger, which earned him a 2000 Deutscher Schallplattenpreis and the Echo Klassik for the best solo recording of music from the 19th century. The recording was awarded another Echo Klassik in 2001, for the complete edition of 12 CDs. His recordings were reviewed in international trade papers such as American Record Guide and Gramophone. He received the Opus Klassik in 2019 for the best concerto recording from the 19th century, for Reger's Piano Concerto.

Becker played chamber music with oboist Albrecht Mayer, clarinetist Sharon Kam, violinist Kolja Blacher, violist Nils Mönkemeyer, cellists Adrian Brendel and Alban Gerhardt, and pianists Igor Levit and Hinrich Alpers. He has played as a jazz pianist in programs and recordings such as Kiev/Chicago and Freistil.

== Awards ==
- 1987 – first prize Internationaler Brahms-Wettbewerb in Hamburg
- 2000, 2001, 2009 – Echo Klassik
- 2000 – Preis der deutschen Schallplattenkritik
- 2002 – Preis der deutschen Schallplattenkritik, year's prize
- 2019 – Opus Klassik
- 2021 – Deutscher Jazzpreis

== Recordings ==
- Aleingang, jazz improvisations (Berthold Records 2021)
- Solitude: Piano Works Volume II by Haydn (Cavi 2020)
- Reger: Piano Concerto, piano pieces, with NDR Radiophilharmonie, Joshua Weilerstein (Cavi 2019)
- Pfitzner / Walter Braunfels: Piano Concertos, with Deutsches Symphonie-Orchester Berlin, Constantin Trinks (Hyperion Records 2019)
- Freistil, jazz improvisations (Berthold Records 2019)
- Haydn: Piano Sonatas (Cavi 2016)
- Julius Reubke: Piano Sonata and Organ Sonata (transcription by August Stradal, Hyperion 2014)
- Kiev/Chicago: works by Modest Mussorgsky, Alexander Skrjabin, jazz improvisations, 2 CDs (Dreyer Gaido 2013)
- Hindemith: Piano Sonatas Nos. 1–3 (Hyperion 2012)
- Widor: Piano Concertos, with BBC National Orchestra of Wales, Thierry Fischer (Hyperion 2010)
- Reger: Bach transcriptions, 2 CDs (Hyperion 2009)
- Jadassohn / Draeseke: Piano Concertos, with Deutsches Symphonie-Orchester Berlin, Michael Sanderling (Hyperion 2009)
- Franz Schmidt: Piano Concertos for the left hand, with NDR Radiophilharmonie, Eiji Ōue (cpo 2006)
- George Antheil: Piano Concertos Nos. 1 and 2 (NDR Radiophilharmonie, Eiji Ōue – cpo 2006)
- Jan Ladislav Dussek: Piano Sonatas, Opp. 44, 61, 64 (cpo 2008)
- Dussek: Piano Sonatas, Opp. 9, 1–3 and 77 (cpo 2007)
- Beethoven: Piano Sonatas, Opp. 2/3 and 106 "Hammerklavier" (cpo 2006)
- Bach: Goldberg Variations BWV 988 (cpo 2002)
- Max Reger, Das gesamte Klavierwerk, vol. 1–12 (Thorofon, 1996–2000)
- Schumann / Brahms: Die fis-Moll-Sonaten Op. 11 and Op. 2 (Thorofon 1996)
- Beethoven: Piano Concerto in E-flat major, WoO 4, Piano Quintet, Op. 16, a.o. (Cavi 2020)
- George Onslow: Sextet, Op. 30 (Ma´alot Quintett – MDG 2017)
- Rostropovich Encores, works by Debussy, Rachmaninoff, Prokofiev a.a., with Alban Gerhardt (Hyperion 2016)
- Schilflieder, Schumann, Herzogenberg a.o., with Albrecht Mayer, Tabea Zimmermann, Marie-Luise Neunecker (Decca 2010)
- Erwin Schulhoff: Violin Sonatas, with Tanja Becker-Bender (Hyperion 2010)
- Reger: Cello Sonatas and Cello Suites, with Alban Gerhardt (Hyperion 2007)
- Franz and Richard Strauss: works for horn and piano, with Stephan Dohr (Campanella 2001)
- Schumann a.o.: works for oboe and piano, with Albrecht Mayer (EMI 1999)
- Schumann / Elgar: Piano Quintets, with Kolja Blacher, Stanley Dodds, Brett Dean, Ludwig Quandt (IPPNW CD 28, 1999)
- Brahms: Piano Quintet, Op. 26, Horn Trio, Op. 40, with Kolja Blacher, Brett Dean, Ludwig Quandt, Stephan Dohr (IPPNW CD 19, 1997)
- Schumann: Fantasiestücke, Op. 73, with Alban Gerhardt a.o. (IPPNW CD 8, 1993)
