= Fantasy and Fugue on the Theme B-A-C-H =

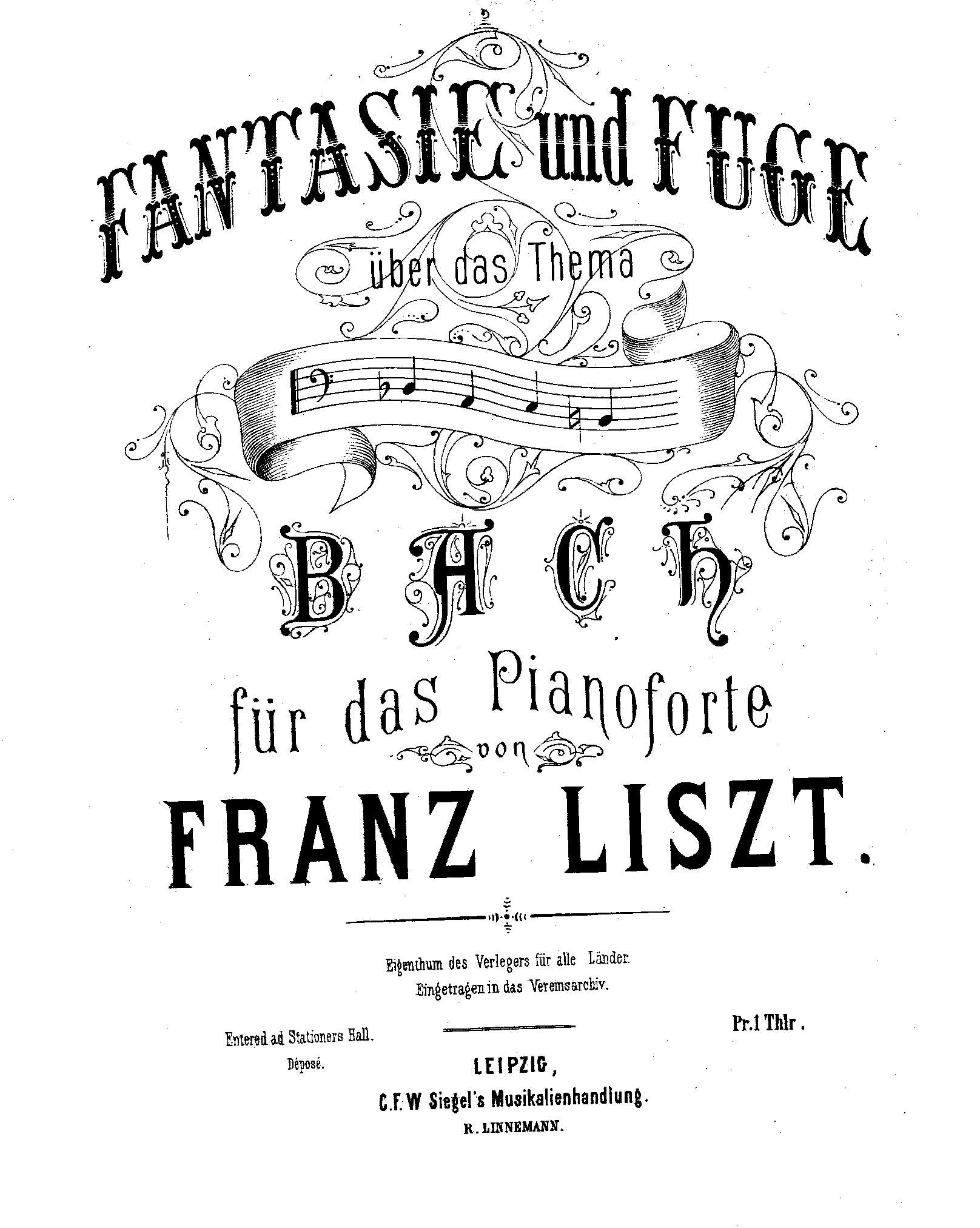
Cover of 2nd piano arr. (S.529ii) first edition, published in 1855.

Fantasie und Fuge über das Thema B-A-C-H (also in the first version known as Präludium und Fuge über das Motiv B-A-C-H), title in English: Fantasy and Fugue on the Theme B-A-C-H) (S.260i/ii [1st/2nd version], S.529i/ii [piano arrangement of 1st/2nd version]) is an organ fantasy on the BACH motif composed by Franz Liszt in 1855, later revised in 1870.

Both versions were transcribed for solo piano by the composer. The piece was dedicated to Alexander Winterberger (who also played it on the premiere, 13 May 1856) and published by Breitkopf & Härtel in 1856. It is, along with the Fantasy and Fugue on the chorale Ad nos, ad salutarem undam, one of Liszt's most famous organ works. It was composed for the consecration of the Ladegast organ in the Merseburg Cathedral. The piece is a recurring piece in the organ repertory and is frequently performed.
