= Opus Festival =

Opus Festival פסטיבל אופוס
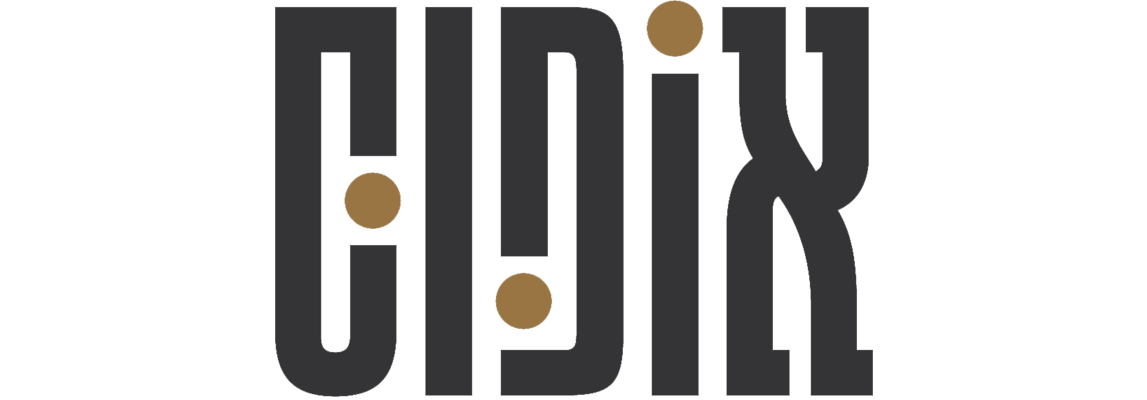
- Genre: Classical Music
- Frequency: Annually
- Venue: Tel Aviv Museum of Art, Henry Crown Symphony Hall, Jerusalem International YMCA.
- Locations: Tel Aviv, Jerusalem
- Website: http://www.opusmagazine.co.il

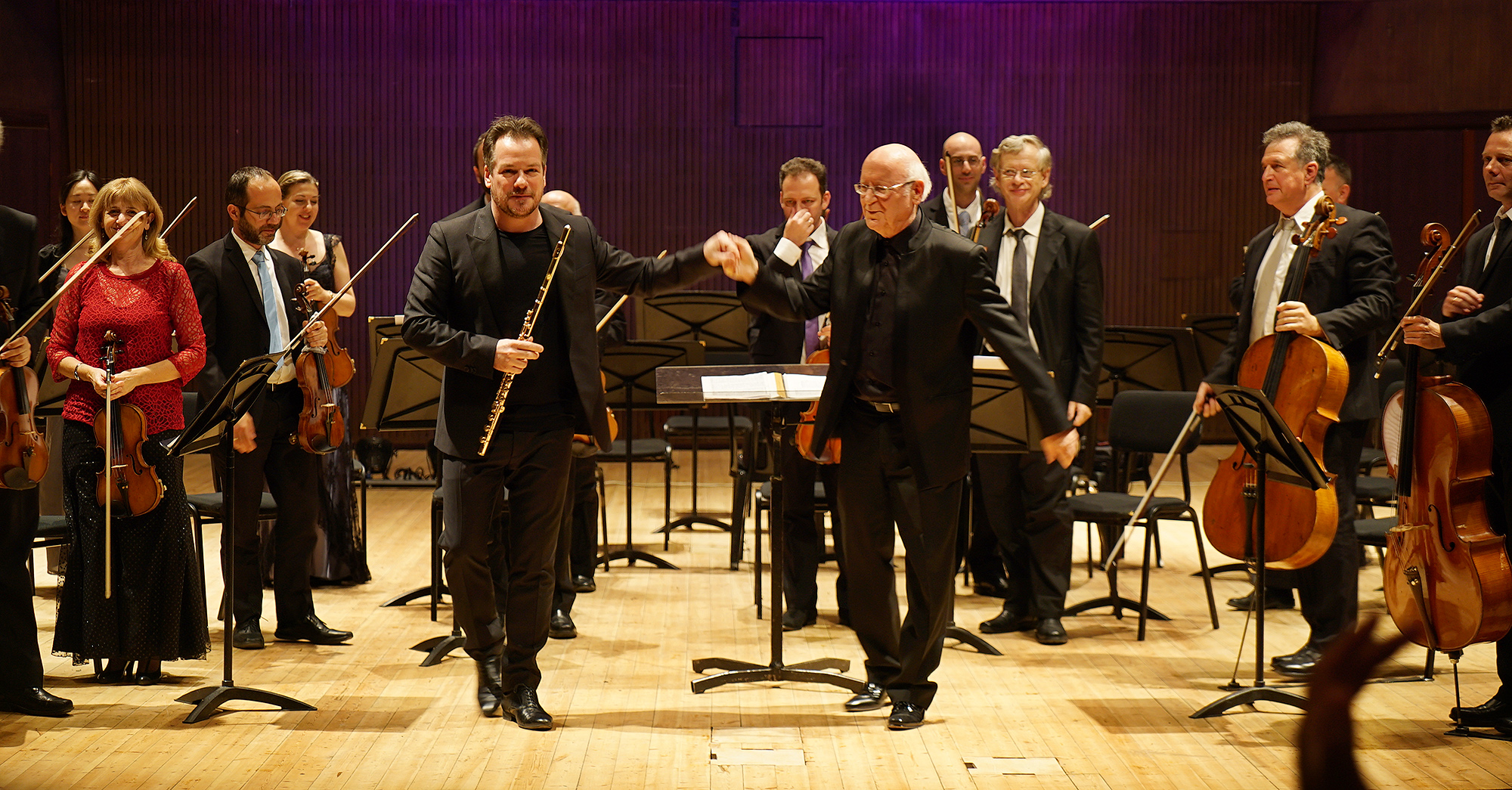
Flautist Emmanuel Pahud and the Israel Camerata Orchestra in a concert of Opus Festival in 2016

Opus Festival (Hebrew: פסטיבל אופוס) is a prominent festival of classical music held annually in Israel. Since year 2014, it has attracted renowned soloists such as Emmanuel Pahud, Kolja Blacher, Radek Baborak, Guy Braunstein, Vadim Gluzman, Winds of the Berlin Philharmonic among others.

Most of its concerts are broadcast live on the Israeli Broadcasting Corporation's Kol Ha Musica. Its programs include symphonic and chamber music as well as recitals. The majority of its concerts are held at the Henry Crown Hall in Jerusalem and the Tel Aviv Museum of Art. Opus Festival is also nurturing promising young musicians and holds masterclasses at the Buchmann-Mehta School of Music.

== Artists ==
Past concerts featured soloists of the Berlin Philharmonic and La Scala opera house.

Violin

- Guy Braunstein
- Vadim Gluzman
- Shlomo Mintz
- Kolja Blacher

Piano

- Boris Giltburg
- Yuja Wang

Oera singers

- Laura Claycomb
- Yaniv d'Or

Flute

- Emmanuel Pahud

Horn

- Radek Baborák

In 2016, Opus held a special concert with violins and celli that survived the holocaust, from Amnon and Avshalom Weinstein's collection
