= Sonata on the 94th Psalm =

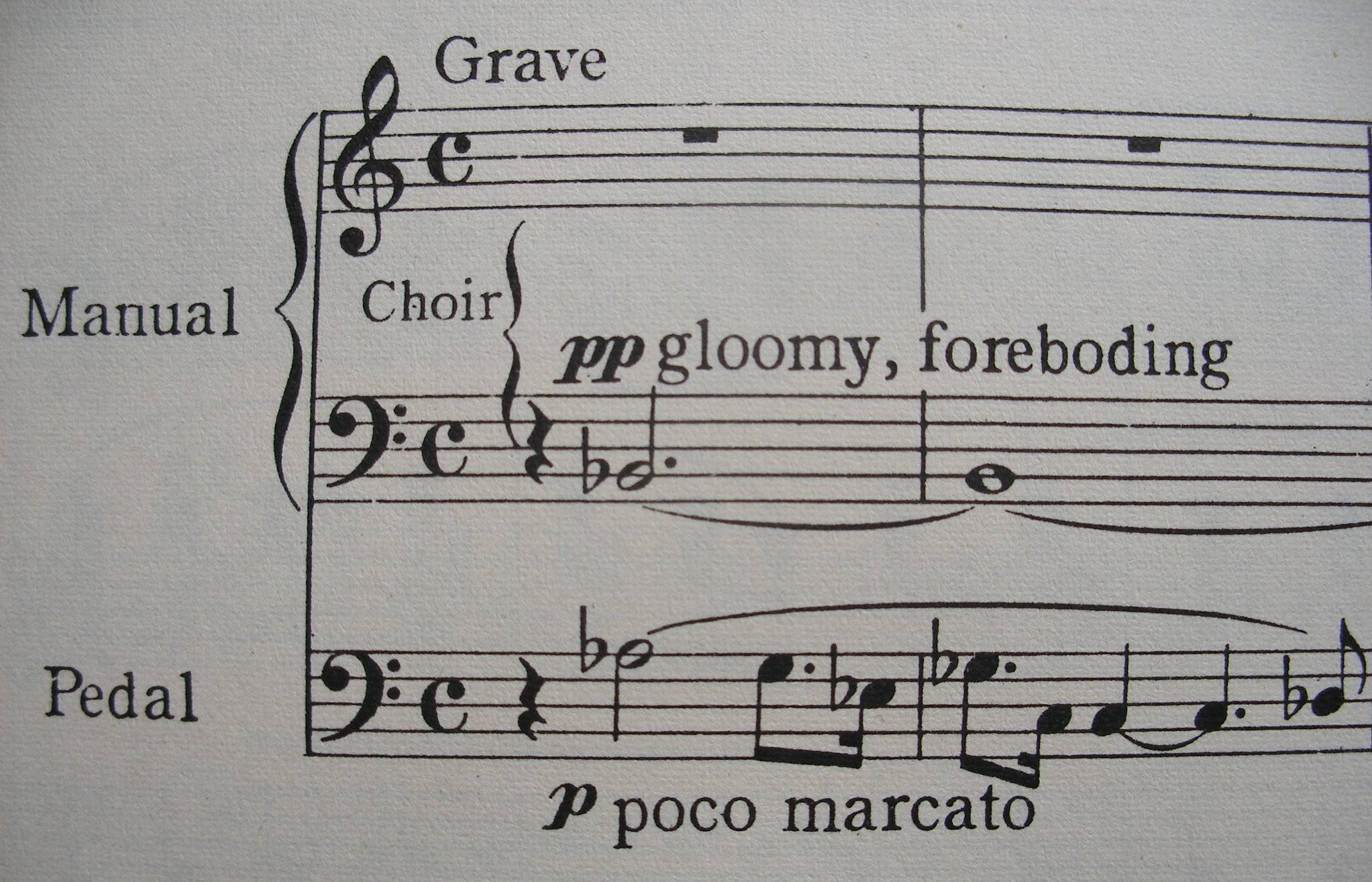
The opening of the Sonata on the 94th Psalm

The Sonata on the 94th Psalm in C minor is a sonata for solo organ by Julius Reubke, based on the text of Psalm 94. It is considered one of the pinnacles of the Romantic repertoire.

It is in four movements:

1. Grave – Larghetto
2. Allegro con fuoco – Grave
3. Adagio – Lento
4. Allegro – Più mosso – Allegro assai

An average performance lasts 23 – 28 minutes.

== Composition ==
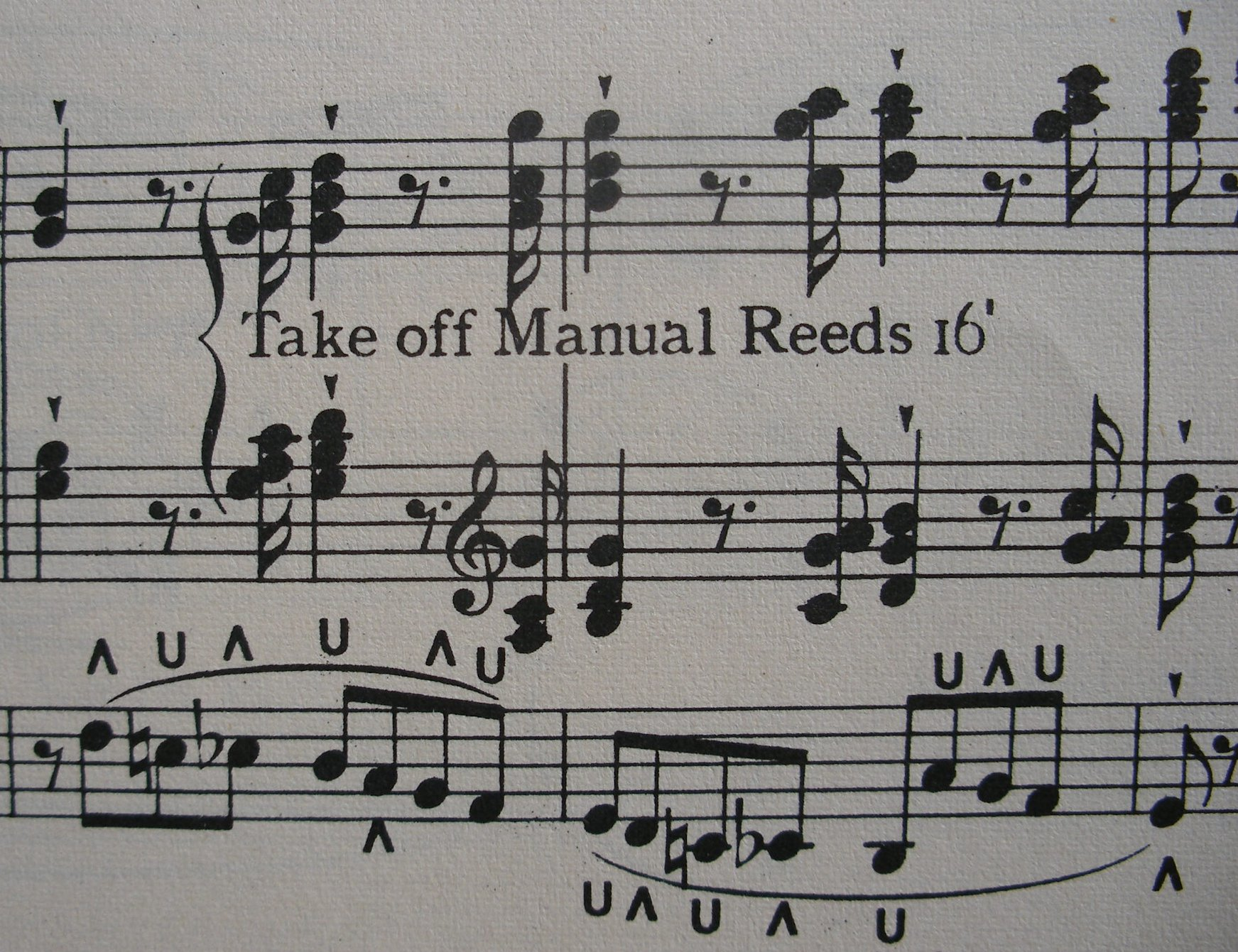

Reubke composed the sonata while he was studying piano and composition in Weimar with Franz Liszt, and living at the Altenburg house. He composed it at the same time as his other large work, the Piano Sonata in B-flat minor, and finished it in April 1857. He dedicated it to Professor Carl Riedel and played the premiere on the Ladegast organ (1853-1855) of Merseburg Cathedral on June 17, 1857.

The 94th Psalm Sonata is considered to be inspired by Liszt's Fantasy and Fugue on the chorale Ad nos, ad salutarem undam, Piano Sonata, symphonic poems and Wagner's operas. It is nonetheless a very individual work composed well for the organ, requiring advanced pedal technique and a resourceful use of all the organ's departments.

== Programme ==
The 94th Psalm sonata is a symphonic poem, and the three movements are connected but formally independent. It is programme music in that the text of the psalm is used to inspire the mood of the piece. These verses accompanied the first performance:

The 94th Psalm

(Grave - Larghetto)
1 O Lord God, to whom vengeance belongeth, shew thyself.
Herr Gott, des die Rache ist, erscheine.
2 Arise, thou Judge of the world: and reward the proud after their deserving.
Erhebe Dich, Du Richter der Welt: vergilt den Hoffärtigen, was sie verdienen.

(Allegro con fuoco)
3 Lord, how long shall the ungodly triumph?
Herr, wie lange sollen die Gottlosen prahlen?
6 They murder the widow, and the stranger: and put the fatherless to death.
Witwen und Fremdlinge erwürgen sie und töten die Weisen
7 And yet they say the Lord shall not see: neither shall the God of Jacob regard it.
und sagen: der Herr sieht es nicht an der Gott Jacobs achtet es nicht.

(Adagio)
17 If the Lord had not helped me: it had not failed but my soul had been put to silence.
Wo der Herr mir nicht hülfe, so läge meine Seele schier in der Stille.
19 In the multitude of sorrows that I had in my heart: thy comforts have refreshed my soul.
Ich hatte viel Bekümmernis in meinem Herzen, aber deine Tröstungen ergötzen meine Seele.

(Allegro)
22 But the Lord is my refuge: and my God is the strength of confidence.
Aber der Herr ist mein Hort und meine Zuversicht.
23 He shall recompense them their wickedness, and destroy them in their own malice.
Er wird ihnen Unrecht vergelten und sie um ihre Bosheit vertilgen.

== Form ==
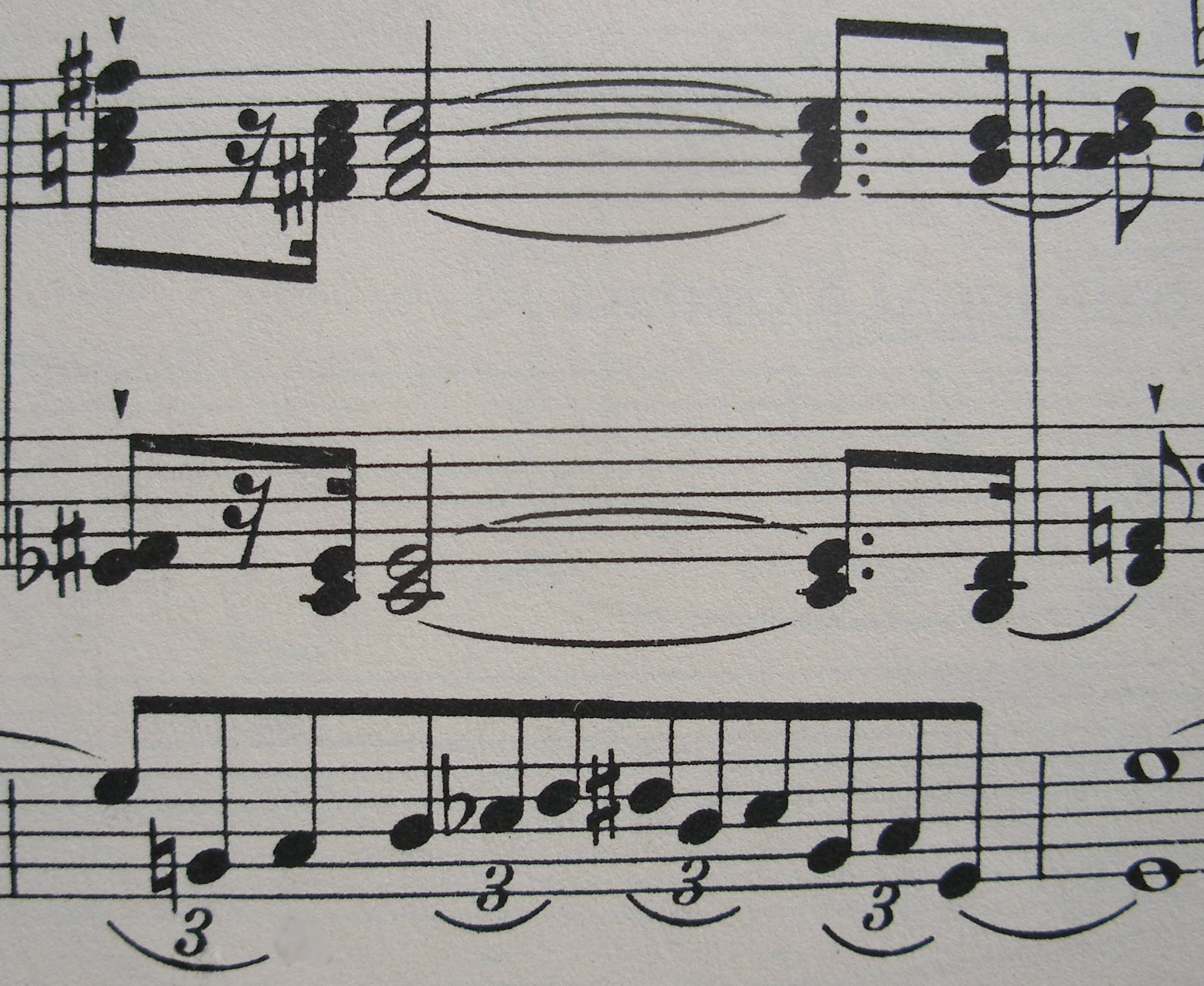
A pedal passage in the 1st movement

The first and second movements are in sonata form; the third movement is a fugue which also has elements of sonata form. An impression of spontaneous improvisation is achieved by the overlapping and enmeshing of phrases and movements, which allows the avoidance of regular structures. All thematic phrases are also shaped irregularly, producing such great diversity that no musical idea is repeated exactly.

The opening theme of the piece provides the basis of all the rest of the thematic material. This music is an interpretation of the text 'Herr, Gott, des die Rache ist, erscheine'; a head-motif is followed by a descending chromatic scale. Ascending chords on the manual follow, a musical invocation of God. The development section of the first movement, from the allegro con fuoco, depicts the second group of verses, leading into a recapitulation in organo pleno.

The adagio second movement depicts the Bekümmernisse (sorrows) and Tröstungen (consolations) moods of the third group of verses, and closes with a reappearance of the opening theme of the sonata.

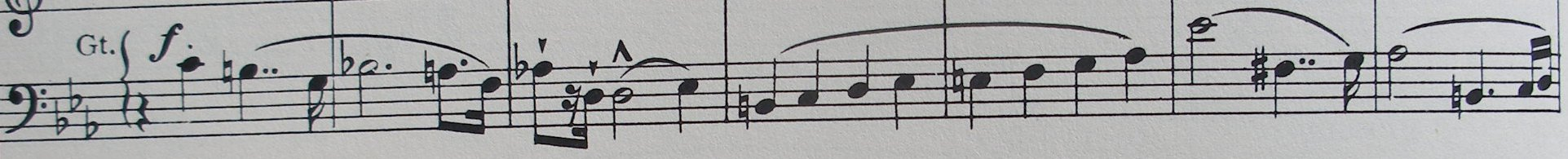
The subject of the final-movement fugue

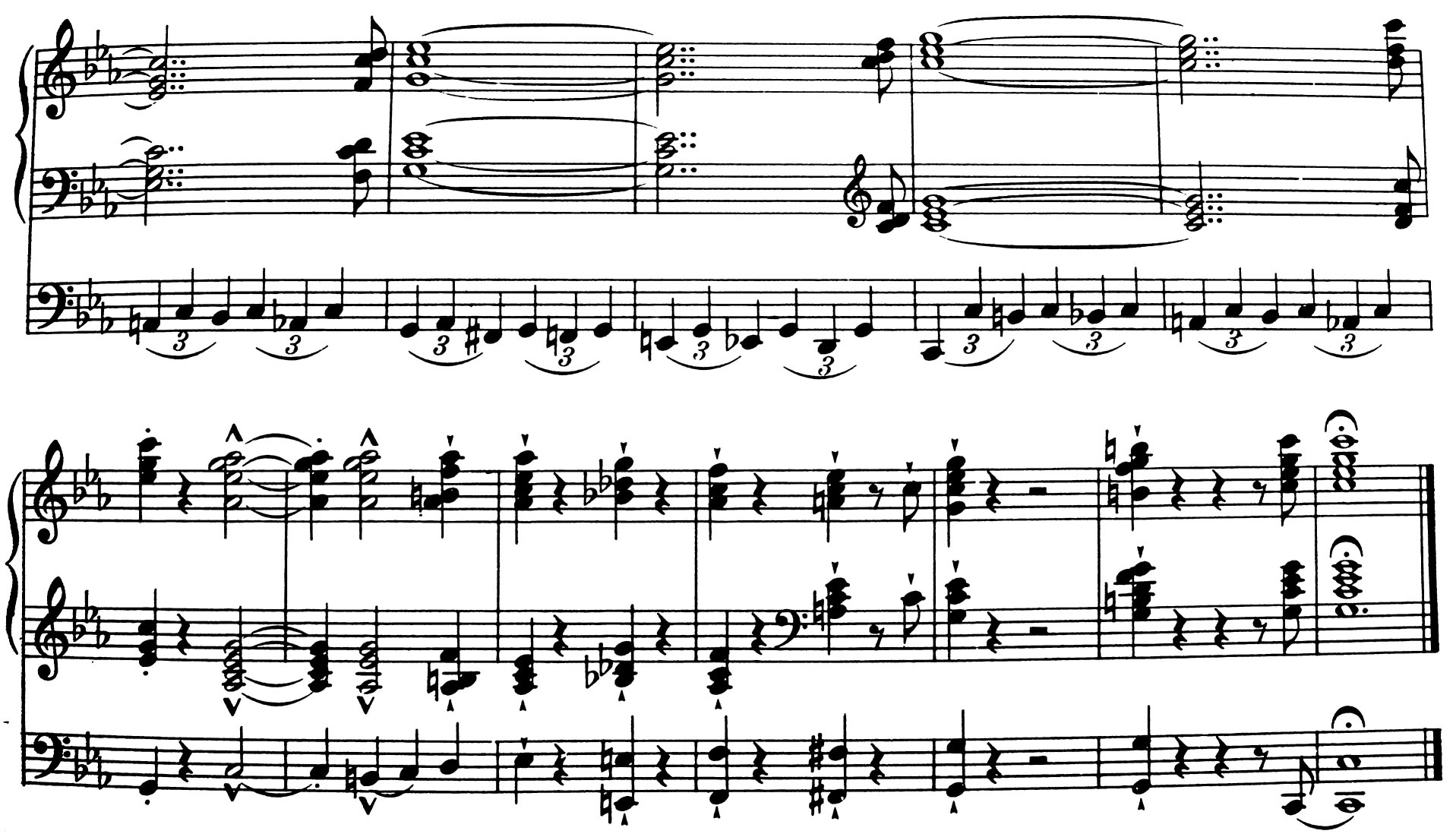
The ending

A furious fugue closes the work, depicting God's judgment and victory over evil. According to E. Power Biggs, Reubke inverts the second half of the original theme, thereby imparting a new drive, energy, and excitement to the music. The exposition and counter-exposition are regular, the subject appearing only on the tonic and dominant degrees of the scale. The opening chords of the sonata appear once more in a linking developmental episode, in a dotted rhythm and with full organ. Unlike similar dramatic compositions in which a contrasting lyrical theme is usually introduced, leading to a final victorious apotheosis, the sonata ends with an accelerated tempo and huge final C minor chords, depicting the gravity of divine judgment.

== Performance and recordings ==
The 94th Psalm sonata is in the repertoire of most concert organists, and has been recorded by many well-known players such as Ben van Oosten, E. Power Biggs, Catherine Crozier, Michael Schönheit, Simon Preston, Alan Morrison, Virgil Fox, Christopher Herrick, Gillian Weir, Jeremy Filsell, Daniel Roth, Kevin Bowyer, David Briggs and Jean Guillou. There is also a variation of the piece compiled and performed by Timothy Howard as part of his organ soundtrack score for the 1922 film, "Nosferatu."

Organist	Organ	Year	Label	Catalogue number	Medium	Mono/Stereo
Ben van Oosten	Seifert Organ in St. Mary’s Basilica, Kevelaer, Germany	2025	MDG - Musikproduktion Dabringhaus und Grimm	MDG 916 2377-6	SACD	Multiplayer Stereo, 5.1, 2+2+2)
E. Power Biggs	Methuen Memorial Music Hall, Methuen, Massachusetts	1953	Columbia Masterworks	ML 4870	LP	Mono
Virgil Fox	John Hays Hammond Museum, Gloucester, Massachusetts	1955	RCA Victor	LM-1917	LP	Mono
Simon Preston	Westminster Abbey, London	1985	Deutsche Grammophon	415 139-2	CD	Stereo
Christopher Herrick	Hallgrímskirkja, Reykjavík	1996	Hyperion	CDA66917	CD	Stereo
David Briggs	First Congregational Church, Los Angeles	1999	Delos	DE3241	CD	Stereo

== Sources ==
- Michael Gailit: Julius Reubke (1834-1858), notes to Kevin Bowyer's recording of The 94th Psalm, Nimbus Records, NI 5361 (1993)
- Reubke's Organ Sonata on the 94th Psalm, in The Musical Times Vol. 73, No. 1074, August 1, 1932
