= Virgil Fox =

American organist (1912–1980)

Virgil Fox

Virgil Keel Fox (May 3, 1912 in Princeton, Illinois – October 25, 1980 in Palm Beach, Florida) was an American organist, known especially for his years as organist at Riverside Church in New York City, from 1946 to 1965, and his flamboyant "Heavy Organ" concerts of the music of Bach in the 1970s, staged complete with light shows. Many of his recordings on the RCA Victor and Capitol labels, mostly in the 1950s and 1960s, have been remastered and re-released on compact disc.

== Birth and studies ==
External audio
- You may listen to Virgil Fox performing works by César Franck in 1955; Here on archive.org
- Virgil Fox performs Johann Sebastian Bach's Passacaglia and Fugue in C Minor, BWV 582; Here on archive.org

Virgil Fox was born on May 3, 1912, in Princeton, Illinois, to Miles and Birdie Fox, a farming family. Showing musical talent at an early age, he began playing the organ for church services as a ten-year old as well as at a local movie theater owned by his father. Four years later, Fox made his concert debut before an audience of 2,500 at Withrow High School in Cincinnati, Ohio. The program included one of the mainstays of 19th-century organ music: Mendelssohn's Sonata No. 1 in F minor.

From 1926 to 1930, Fox studied in Chicago under German-born organist-composer Wilhelm Middelschulte. His other principal teachers were Hugh Price, Louis Robert, and (once he had moved to France) Louis Vierne and Marcel Dupré. He was an alumnus of the Peabody Institute of Music in Baltimore, where he became the first student to complete the course for the Artist's Diploma within a year, at age 18. By the age of nineteen, he had already performed for enthusiastic audiences at London's Kingsway Hall and New York City's Carnegie Hall.

== Early career ==
Beginning in 1936, Fox was organist at Brown Memorial Presbyterian Church in Baltimore while teaching at Peabody. During August and September, 1938, he played in Great Britain and Germany; Fox was the first non-German organist given permission to perform publicly in the Thomaskirche in Leipzig—a special occasion, since Bach served as cantor of the Thomaskirche until his death in 1750. He also served as head of Peabody's Organ Department from 1938 until 1942.

== Military service ==
During World War II, Fox enlisted in the United States Army Air Forces and took a leave of absence from Brown Memorial Presbyterian Church in Baltimore and the Peabody. He was promoted to staff sergeant and played various recitals and services at the request of Eleanor Roosevelt. He served on her Home Hospitality Committee and entertained returning troops who were in Walter Reed Hospital, by playing a piano he pushed around, and joining in with two others. They sang funny and rather raunchy songs to the bedridden. After having played more than 600 concerts while on duty, he was discharged from the Army Air Forces in 1946.

== Riverside Church ==
External audio
- You may listen to Virgil Fox performing Johann Sebastian Bach's "Jesu, Joy of Man's Desiring" at the Riverside Church in 1958; Here on archive.org
- You may listen to Virgil Fox performing Bach's "Air on the G String" at the Riverside Church in 1958; Here on archive.org

Fox then served as organist at the prominent Riverside Church in New York City, from 1946 to 1965. The church's original Hook and Hastings organ installed in 1930 was rebuilt at his insistence by famed organ builder G. Donald Harrison, Master Builder of the Mormon Tabernacle organ plus others. Under his direction, the Riverside organ was expanded to become one of the largest in North America. His extemporaneous hymn accompaniments at Riverside's Sunday services and concert performances were widely acclaimed, and fans would wait after church services for hours to meet him.

While serving regularly at Riverside Church, Fox also performed at several other concert venues. As a representative of the U. S. Department of State, he performed at the First International Conference of Sacred Music held in Bern, Switzerland in 1952. In 1962, he also appeared with his fellow organists E. Power Biggs and Catherine Crozier to inaugurate the newly installed organ at Philharmonic Hall in New York City's Lincoln Center. Over the years, he was even invited to perform at the White House as a pianist on three separate occasions.

Recordings made during this period brought his playing to larger audiences. They included Fox's unique interpretation of works by Bach, Handel, Fibich and Joseph Jongen. In 1965, Fox left Riverside Church to devote himself to concertizing full-time.

== Concert tours ==
From 1970 until 1978, Fox performed his famous "Heavy Organ" concerts in auditoriums, popular music concert halls, and other nontraditional organ music venues, touring around the United States with a rented electronic Rodgers Touring Organ. Later on he used his own instrument, a massive four-manual, custom-designed Allen Organ (1977–1980). The Heavy Organ concerts exclusively featured works of Johann Sebastian Bach accompanied by a large-scale light show, "Revelation Lights" by David Snyder, that was synchronized with the music, thereby bringing together aural and visual elements. The spectacle attracted enthusiastic audiences numbering in the thousands, but was not without its critics. William F. Buckley was reported by the New York Times as saying Fox, "must have figured that it was more important to fill the house with listeners who would hear Bach for the first time than worry about those who would resolve, like me, to have heard Fox for the last time".

During this period, half of Fox's performances were "Heavy Organ" concerts accompanied by "Revelation Lights", with the virtuoso organist speaking informally to the audiences, and half were traditional classical music. In the latter category, a Fox recital at Lakeland University in Sheboygan, Wisconsin, was typical: he played Julius Reubke's monumental Sonata on the 94th Psalm, Charles Ives' Variations on "America", the "Libera Me" movement from Fauré's Requiem, Bach's Adagio and Fugue in A minor, and Henri Mulet's Thou Art the Rock, among others. In a rave review, the Sheboygan Press critic was effusive in her praise, calling the recital "electrifying". She reported that the "packed house, cheering and clapping, insisted on three encores that gave the night its stunning climax". Time magazine reported that Fox earned between $6 – 8 thousand per performance (comparable to $39 – 52 thousand in 2025 dollars).

Fox also continued to concertize in more traditional concert settings as well. In 1974, he appeared in the inaugural recital of a new Rodgers organ at Carnegie Hall after assisting in its design. In the winter of 1975 he returned to Carnegie Hall and appeared with the American Symphony orchestra under the baton of Richard Westenburg in the Albert Schweitzer Centennial Concert. Several years later in 1977 he also performed in a sold-out concert featuring the music of Bach at the Kennedy Center in Washington, D.C.

External audio
- You may hear Virgil Fox interviewed by Robert Sherman on WQXR-FM in 1975; Here on wnyc.org

Fox was one of the rare organists to perform on nationally televised entertainment programs in the 1960s and 1970s, such as The Mike Douglas Show, The Ed Sullivan Show, and CBS Camera Three, bringing organ masterworks to mass audiences as no other organist had done before. In 1975, he was also interviewed by the music critic Robert Sherman on his Great Artists Series program on WQXR radio in New York City. His last commercially released recording, though unauthorized, was made at his return (by popular demand) to Riverside Church in concert on May 6, 1979.

In his 50th year of performing on the organ, Fox gave his final public performance with the Dallas Symphony Orchestra on September 26, 1980, although he was racked with pain from metastasized prostate cancer that resulted in his death the following month.

== Music ==
Fox always stressed pushing the limits of the instruments available to him, rather than requiring that they, or his playing, be authentic to the era of the music. His style (particularly his taste for fast tempos, intricate registrations, and a willingness to luxuriate in sentimentality) was in contrast to that of many of his contemporaries, such as E. Power Biggs.

Fox was also famous for his musical memory, and could instantly recall over 200 concert works. He played all concerts from memory and very rarely read from written scores even when playing alongside an orchestra.

Many organists, however, strongly criticized Fox for his unconventional interpretations of classical organ music. On his album Heavy Organ: Bach Live at Winterland, Fox defended his approach to Bach and organ music in general, in the introduction to the ubiquitous Toccata and Fugue in D minor, BWV 565, by Johann Sebastian Bach; Virgil always spoke to his audiences about Bach's reason for his compositions being his belief in Jesus and everlasting life whenever he performed his music.

There is current in our land (and several European countries) at this moment a kind of nitpicking worship of historic impotence. They say that Bach must not be interpreted and that he must have no emotion, that his notes speak for themselves. You want to know what that is? Pure unadulterated rot! Bach has the red blood. He has the communion with the people. He has all of this amazing spirit. And imagine that you could put all the music on one side of the agenda with his great interpretation and great feeling and put the greatest man of all right up on top of a dusty shelf underneath some glass case in a museum and say that he must not be interpreted! They're full of you-know-what and they're so untalented that they have to hide behind this thing because they couldn't get in the house of music any other way!

For once making a similar speech at one of his recitals, music critic Alan Rich called him "the Liberace of the organ loft", and severely took him to task in New York Magazine.

Despite (or perhaps because of) his controversial approach to organ music, Virgil Fox attained a celebrity status not unlike that of Leonard Bernstein and Glenn Gould. The New York Times said of him, 20 years after his death, "Fox could play the pipe organ like nobody's business, but that is not all that made him unforgettable to so many people across the country. He made classical organ music appeal even to audiences that normally wouldn't be expected to sit still for it."

== Honors ==
Fox was a National Patron of Delta Omicron, an international professional music fraternity. He designed the 1964 Reuter Pipe Organ at Bucknell University and was awarded a Doctorate Degree. He was given Keys to the City in numerous acts of gratitude by Mayors of numerous cities.

== Death and legacy ==
External audio
- You may listen to Virgil Fox performing Johann Sebastian Bach's "Trio Sonata for Organ No. 6 in G" at the Riverside Church in 1958; Here on archive.org
- You may listen to Virgil Fox performing Henry Purcell's "Trumpet Tune & Air" at the Riverside Church in 1958; Here on archive.org

Fox had surgery for prostate cancer in December 1975 and later underwent radiation treatments after it was found to have metastasized. He was greatly debilitated and in considerable pain from the disease when he gave his final performance on September 26, 1980, with the Dallas Symphony. Near collapse the morning after the concert, he was rushed back to Florida by private airplane from Texas to be hospitalized near his Palm Beach home, "Casa Lagomar", and the remainder of his planned concert tour was cancelled. Fox died on October 25, 1980, followed by a private funeral held at Casa Lagomar conducted by his longtime assistant and adopted son, David Snyder. A large-scale public funeral service was subsequently held at the Crystal Cathedral in California, where Fox lay in state. His remains were cremated and his ashes are interred at Pioneer Cemetery, Dover, Illinois, next to his grandparents.

In a sign of continued recognition unusual for a performer (as distinct from a composer), Virgil Fox memorial recitals and concerts have been staged years after his death. In May 1990, for example, a Virgil Fox Memorial Concert was given at the Crystal Cathedral organ by Frederick Swann, who was his successor at Riverside Church. On what would have been Fox's 80th birthday, a special tribute in his memory was broadcast by KBYU-FM in Provo, Utah. Entitled Virgil Fox: American Virtuoso, the May 3, 1992, radio program, produced almost twelve years after his death, included an excerpt of Swann's Crystal Cathedral memorial of 1990 and highlighted a virtuoso performance of Joseph Jongen's Symphonie Concertante by Fox in Tokyo, Japan, recorded fifteen years previously. Also that month, an "Organ Greats Virgil Fox and E. Power Biggs" concert was held at the Library of Congress in Washington, D.C. In 2012, the centennial year of his birth, a tribute to Fox was included in an organ concert held at a church in Vancouver, Canada. Many of his recordings have been re-mastered and are widely available on compact discs, as well as regularly heard on radio programs featuring organ music, such as Pipedreams and Sacred Classics.

A compilation of Fox's arrangements of organ works by J. S. Bach, George Frideric Handel, Franz Liszt, Camille Saint-Saens and Richard Wagner was published by Alfred Music Publishing in 1994. At the Organ with Virgil Fox contains several musical scores of some of Fox's most frequently performed works along with his markings, registrations, and transcriptions for students of the organ.

Biographies written about Fox after his death include the controversial Virgil Fox (The Dish): An Irreverent Biography of the Great American Organist (2001) by his former manager, Richard Torrence (2001), and Virgil Fox — His real life... with secrets you never knew (2020) by David Snyder. The Virgil Fox Society, formed to perpetuate his memory, established the Virgil Fox Scholarship under the auspices of the American Guild of Organists in 2002.

== Archived works and displays ==
- The Virgil Fox Collection at the Organ Historical Society contains manuscripts, correspondence, programs, transcripts, videos and organ specifications by Virgil Fox.
- The Discography of American Historical Recordings catalog at the University of California at Santa Barbara contains thirty- eight audio recordings on the Victor and Decca labels by Virgil Fox from the years 1941-1977.
- Various Fox relics including items of his stage clothing, the actual record that inspired his arrangement of "Come, Sweet Death" and the organ console from his Englewood, N.J. mansion, are on display by the Friends of the Wanamaker Organ at Macy's Center City in Philadelphia.

== See also ==
- Organ
- Electronic organ
- Pipe organ
- Classical music
