= Piano Sonata in B-flat minor =

Piano Sonata in B-flat minor may refer to:

- Piano Sonata No. 2 (Chopin)
- Piano Sonata No. 2 (Rachmaninoff)
- Piano Sonata (Reubke)
