= Alexander Winterberger =

German organist and composer

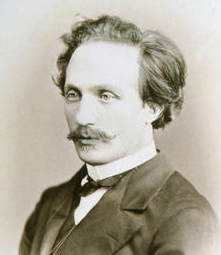
Alexander Winterberger, by Sergey Lvovich Levitsky

Alexander Winterberger (14 August 1834 – 23 September 1914) was a German organist and composer. He is mostly remembered for his association with Franz Liszt, in particular his close involvement with the two great organ fantasies Liszt wrote for the Merseburg Cathedral organ, the Fantasy and Fugue on the chorale "Ad nos ad salutarem undam" and the Fantasy and Fugue on the Theme B-A-C-H.

== Biography ==
Alexander Winterberger was born in 1834 in Weimar. He studied at Weimar with the Weimar Municipal Organist Johann Gottlob Töpfer (1791-1870).

Although he also studied under Franz Liszt until 1853, he was in the 'outer circle' of students, that is, not among those with whom Liszt spent most time and was on most intimate personal terms. He displayed a mastery of novel registrations, which in some cases Liszt and he worked out together. Winterberger had been a classmate of Julius Reubke in Berlin, and he was instrumental in Reubke deciding to come to Weimar to study with Liszt.

In 1855 Liszt inspected the construction of the new organ at Merseburg Cathedral, and resolved to write (some sources say he was commissioned by Winterberger) a grand piece for the official opening: his Fantasy and Fugue on the Theme B-A-C-H. The date was set for 26 September 1855, but by 22 September the Fantasy was still not ready. Instead, he decided to have Winterberger premiere the revised version of the Fantasy and Fugue on the chorale "Ad nos ad salutarem undam" (it had been published in 1852, but Liszt revised it more than once, most recently in 1855). They rehearsed the work together a few days before the official opening.

The B-A-C-H Fantasy and Fugue, dedicated to Winterberger, finally had its premiere on 13 May 1856, again at Merseburg Cathedral. On the same occasion Winterberger also played Liszt's arrangement of the Church Festive Overture on the chorale "Ein feste Burg" ("A Mighty Fortress") by Otto Nicolai.

Winterberger toured the Netherlands in 1856, receiving much praise for his performances of the two Liszt fantasies and fugues.

On 31 August 1856 he played the organ part in the premiere of Liszt's Missa solennis zur Einweihung der Basilika in Gran (Gran Mass), at the inauguration of Esztergom Basilica, conducted by the composer, in the presence of Emperor Franz Joseph I of Austria and his Viennese court.

Winterberger arranged for the organ Liszt's 1859 Prelude on Bach's Cantata Weinen, Klagen, Sorgen, Zagen, originally written for piano.

In 1886-87 he compiled and published 12 volumes of technical exercises composed by Liszt. Winterberger edited the piano sonatas by Beethoven, with preface and annotations, Edition "Musikwoche", printed Leipzig, Bibliographische Anstalt Adolph Schumann.

He lived at various times in Vienna, St Petersburg and Leipzig; his pupils in Vienna included Samuel de Lange jr.

Alexander Winterberger's photographic portrait by Sergey Lvovich Levitsky is housed at the State P. I. Tchaikovsky Memorial Museum at Klin, Russia. He died in 1914, aged 80.

== Works ==
Winterberger's own compositions include:

- Lieder für Singstimme und Klavier (oder Orgel, oder Harmonium), Op. 58 (texts by Julius Sturm)
- Dreissig Lieder und Gesänge, Op. 91
- Neun leichte Sonatinen für Pianoforte, Op. 104
- Fünf Geistliche Gesänge für Singstimme und Klavier (oder Orgel, oder Harmonium), Op. 119 (texts by Johann Friedrich Räder)
