= Robert Sherman (music critic) =

American radio broadcaster (1932–2023)

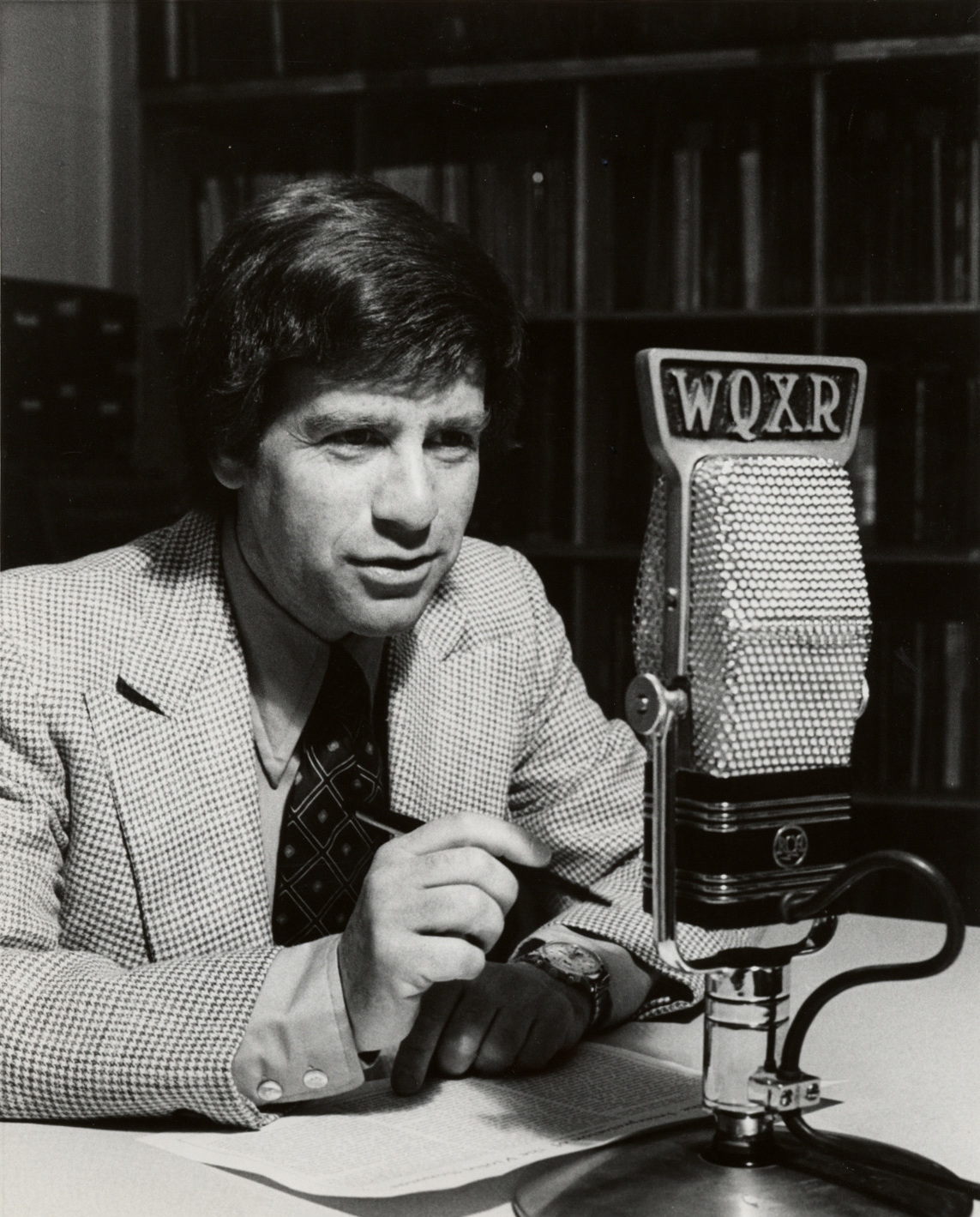
- Sherman speaking on WQXR
- Born: July 23, 1932; Manhattan, New York, U.S.
- Died: June 27, 2023 (aged 90); Ossining, New York, U.S.
- Presenting career
- Show: Woody's Children, Young Artists Showcase
- Stations: WFUV; WQXR
- Country: United States
- Previous show: The Listening Room

Robert Sherman (July 23, 1932 – June 27, 2023) was an American radio broadcaster, author, music critic, and educator. He achieved success as a host of such radio programs as the folk music show Woody's Children, which started on WQXR and was later broadcast by WFUV, and classical music shows The Listening Room and Young Artists Showcase, which were broadcast by WQXR in New York City. As an author, he was a music critic and columnist for The New York Times for more than forty years as well as a writer of numerous books, including two bestsellers he co-authored with pianist and comedian Victor Borge. In May 2023, Sherman retired from radio. A month later, he died at age 90.

== Early life ==
Robert Sherman was born on July 23, 1932. His parents were Isaac Sherman, a Ukrainian businessman, and the Lithuanian pianist Nadia Reisenberg, and he was the nephew of thereminist Clara Rockmore.

== Career ==
Sherman began his broadcasting career at the radio station WQXR in New York City as a typist-clerk, eventually working his way up to program director and then senior consultant. In 1969, he began hosting the radio folk program Woody's Children. In 1970, The Listening Room debuted with Sherman as host and was picked up to be nationally broadcast. Several decades later, in 1993, the program's gala finale was broadcast from the Merkin Concert Hall in New York City and featured several well known classical musicians, including Victor Borge, Marilyn Horne, and Isaac Stern.

Sherman soon moved to television, when he began hosting the program Vibrations on PBS and Camera Three on CBS, both in 1972. During this time, he continued working at WQXR, hosting several more radio programs from the late 1970s to the 2000s. Over the years, guests on his Great Artists Series included several noted composers, conductors, and performers of the time, including Samuel Barber, Virgil Fox, and Andre Kostelanetz.

In 1964, Sherman began contributing regularly to The New York Times as both a music columnist and critic. In 1969, he started his career as a lecturer and educator at New York University, teaching there for almost twenty years. He also served on the faculty of the Juilliard School for nearly twenty years.

External audio
- You may listen to Robert Sherman's interview with Virgil Fox on WQXR-FM in 1975; Here on wnyc.org

In 1971 and 1980, respectively, Sherman published two bestselling books: My Favorite Intermissions and My Favorite Comedies in Music, in collaboration with pianist and comedian Victor Borge. He was also the author of The Complete Idiot's Guide to Classical Music, published in 1997 and many other books.

Sherman was also a concert narrator for such groups as the Greenwich Symphony and Canadian Brass. He served on the advisory boards of a multitude of cultural organizations, for whom he performed such duties as competition judge, pre-concert lecturer, panel moderator, and fundraising emcee. He hosted the Lincoln Center for the Performing Arts presentation of the annual Avery Fisher Career Grants and hosted and produced the McGraw-Hill Companies' Young Artists Showcase.

== Other ventures ==
Sherman spent many years preserving the memories of both his mother, the pianist Nadia Reisenberg, and his aunt, thereminist Clara Rockmore, through the management of biographies, memorial events, and the writing of commentaries on their recordings. In collaboration with his brother, Alexander Sherman, Robert completed the project of releasing a book about his mother, entitled Nadia Reisenberg: A Musician's Scrapbook, which was published by International Piano Archives in Maryland in 1986. In 2004, Sherman founded the Nadia Reisenberg-Clara Rockmore Foundation to further celebrate the legacies of his mother and aunt. Among its many projects, the foundation remastered, released, or re-released more than a dozen CD recordings.

== Retirement and death ==
In May 2023, Sherman announced his retirement from WQXR, after 68 years of service. He died on June 27, at age 90. He was married twice. His first marriage, to Ruth Sherman (née Gershuni), ended in divorce. His subsequent marriage, to Veronica Bravo, lasted until her death in 2012. He is survived by his two sons, his four grandchildren, and his partner, Jill Bloom.

== Archives ==
- Robert Sherman collection, Special Collections in Performing Arts, University of Maryland Libraries (link) – the collection includes Sherman's papers, scripts, writings, photographs, and recordings of his programs dating from 1932 to 2023.
- The NYPR Archive Collection includes interviews by Robert Sherman with leading figures from the world of classical music and the performing arts along with samples of recordings from 1974 to 1985, at WQXR Great Artists Series – at WQXR.org
