= Samuel de Lange =

Dutch composer (1840–1911)

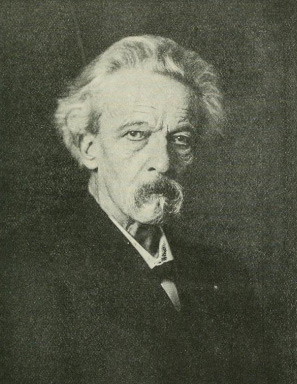
Samuel de Lange Jr. in a book of 1908

Samuel de Lange Jr. (22 February 1840 – 7 July 1911) was a Dutch composer, music conservatory director, organist, pianist, conductor and music teacher. His father, Samuel de Lange Sr., and his brother Daniel, one year his junior, were also well-known musicians.

== Biography ==
De Lange was born in Rotterdam, the son of Johanna Molijn and Samuel de Lange Sr., a music teacher and organist in Rotterdam. In the year of Samuel Jr.'s birth, his father established a piano company with Jan and George Rijken, "Rijken & de Lange", a company that still operates in Rotterdam.

Among other teachers, Samuel Jr. studied organ with Alexander Winterberger, a pupil of Liszt, and piano with Karol Mikuli, a pupil of Chopin. He took music composition lessons with Johannes Verhulst and Berthold Damcke.

He spent his unusually productive life in many cities and countries. When he was just a teenager, he toured Eastern Europe as a pianist with his brother Daniël and Adrien-François Servais, both cellists. From the age of 20 to 23 (1860-1863) he taught piano at the music conservatory of Lemberg (now Lviv, Ukraine). After that he returned to Rotterdam, but he soon went abroad again. He lived and worked subsequently in Basel, Paris, Cologne and The Hague to finally settle in Stuttgart, where he became director of the music conservatory.

De Lange befriended many fellow composers, including Johannes Brahms, Max Bruch and Max Reger, and dedicated compositions to Friedrich Grützmacher (1st cello concerto), Hugo Becker (2nd cello sonata), Charles-Marie Widor and Johannes Brahms.

De Lange introduced reforms in the education of music in Cologne, Basel, and Stuttgart and was, with his father, instrumental in the founding of De Nederlandse Bachvereniging. In 1871, he played the first performance in the Netherlands of Brahms' 1st piano concerto.

Samuel de Lange Jr. died in his residence town of Stuttgart at the age of 70.

== Compositions ==
De Lange's musical style was influenced by Bach and Beethoven, among others. His earlier works are akin to those by Schumann and Mendelssohn, while his later works are closer to those of Brahms. In contrast to his brother Daniël, from whom far fewer compositions have survived, he was not charmed by the music of contemporaries like Wagner and Liszt.

His musical works include over 800 compositions, among which are 13 string quartets, many organ compositions, three cello concertos, two piano concertos, two violin concertos, one viola concerto, four piano sonatas, four violin sonatas, three cello sonatas, a clarinet sonata in c minor, five piano trios, a piano quintet, a string quintet and hundreds of vocal works in a variety of settings. For example Friedrich Hebbel's poem Ein frühes Liebesleben is used in an unusual instrumentation for voice, string quartet and harp. An arrangement with piano instead of harp was made during a centennial revival of Samuel and Daniël de Lange's music. Only a small number of his compositions have yet been recorded, among which are two cello sonatas, several organ works, a number of songs, and some piano music.

De Lange is still "notorious" for his Tägliche Übungen im Pedalspiel, a practice book for playing the organ pedal keyboard.

== Sources ==
- Biography at the Stichting DE LANGE website
