= Carl Riedel =

German conductor and composer

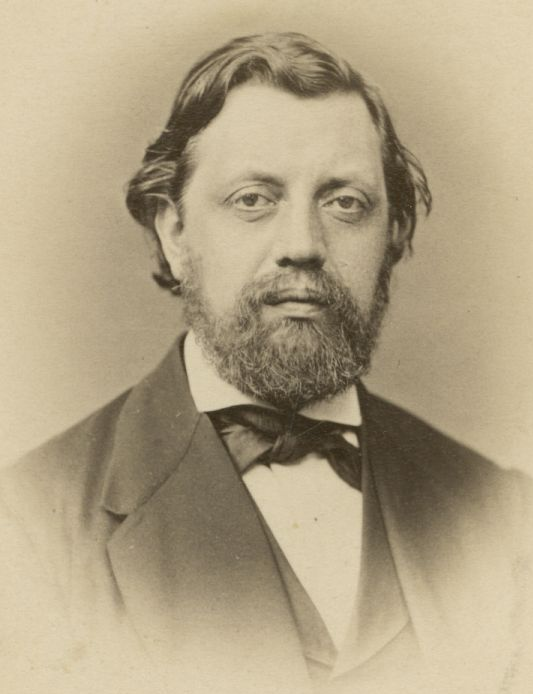
Carl Riedel

Carl Riedel (6 October 1827 – 3 June 1888) was a German conductor and composer. Born in Cronenberg, Wuppertal, he initially worked as a dyer of silk before conductor Karl Wilhelm discovered his musical talent and encouraged him to pursue a music career. He studied at the Leipzig Conservatory and after graduating from the school joined the conservatory's faculty as a professor of piano and music theory, teaching there for several decades. He was notably one of Julius Reubke's teachers, and Reubke dedicated his Sonata on the 94th Psalm to him. He was a highly respected choral conductor in his native country and was one of the founders of the Allgemeiner Deutscher Musikverein. He died in Leipzig in 1888 at the age of 60.

== Sources ==
- Uwe Eckardt (2001). "Carl Riedel". In Bautz, Traugott (ed.). Biographisch-Bibliographisches Kirchenlexikon (BBKL) (in German). Vol. 18. Herzberg: Bautz. cols. 1199–1200. ISBN 3-88309-086-7.
