= August Stradal =

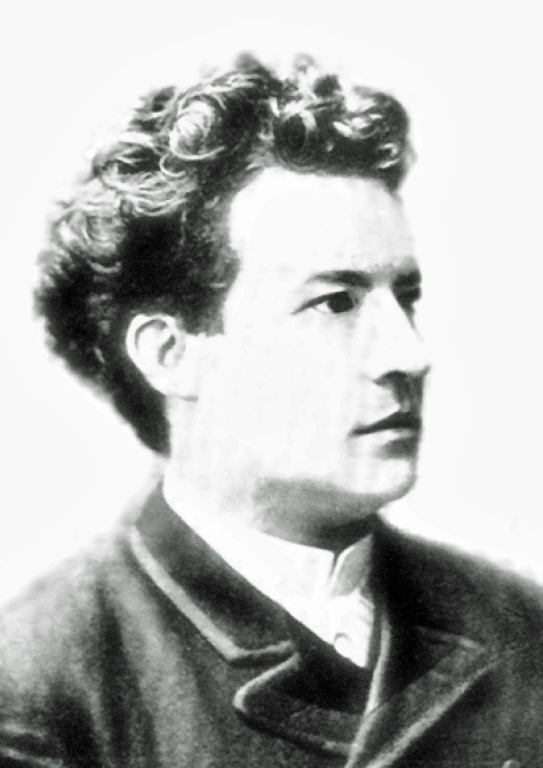
August Stradal

August Stradal (17 May 1860 – 13 March 1930) was a Czech virtuoso pianist, arranger, composer, author and music teacher.

== Career ==
Stradal was born on 17 May 1860 in Teplice, Bohemia, Austrian Empire (now the Czech Republic). He attended the grammar school in Litoměřice and then the Vienna Conservatory, where he studied piano with Anton Door. He also became a composition student of Anton Bruckner and studied piano further with Theodor Leschetizky and (from late 1884) with Franz Liszt, appearing in the latter's master classes in Weimar, Rome, and Pest, where he played some of Liszt's most difficult works.

After returning to Teplice, Stradal was active as a teacher until 1890. For some years he travelled widely as a recitalist on the Continent and in London, particularly admired as a Liszt interpreter. He married Rosa Zweigelt from Krásná Lípa. Then he devoted himself to making piano transcriptions. He arranged music from Bach (most of the organ works and concertos, including the six Brandenburgs), Beethoven, Brahms, Bruckner (Symphonies 1, 2, 5, 6, and 8), Buxtehude, Handel (the organ concertos), Liszt (the 13 Symphonic Poems and the Dante Symphony), Mozart, Paganini, Purcell, Reubke, Strauss, Wagner and Vivaldi.

Stradal also composed some original works, including piano pieces (such as the Ungarische Rhapsodie) and songs. He received the Czechoslovak State Award in 1928. The following year he published his Reminiscences of Liszt. Stradal died in Krásná Lípa on 13 March 1930, aged 69.

== Selected works (solo piano) ==
- Bach – Organ sonata in E minor BWV 528
- Bach – Second Organ Concerto
- Bach – Brandenburg Concertos nos.3 and 4
- Bach – Piano Concerto in F major
- Bach W.F. – Fantasy and Fugue in A minor
- Beethoven – String Quartet, Op.131
- Brahms – 3 Caprices after the Waltzes, Op.39
- Bruckner – String Quintet in F major
- Buxtehude – Passacaglia in D minor
- Buxtehude – Prelude and fugue in A minor
- Buxtehude – Prelude and fugue in D minor
- Buxtehude – Prelude and fugue in E minor (no.2)
- Buxtehude – Prelude and fugue in F major
- Buxtehude – Prelude and fugue in F♯ minor
- Buxtehude – Prelude and fugue in G minor
- Buxtehude – Prelude in E minor
- Liszt – Dante Symphony
- Transcriptions of all 13 of Liszt's Symphonic Poems
- Liszt – Faust Symphony
- Liszt – Es muss ein Wunderbares sein
- Mozart – Symphony no.40
- Mozart – Canzone on The Marriage of Figaro
- Paganini – Bravoure Study on Caprices
- Purcell – Chaconne
- Reubke – Sonata on the 94th Psalm
- Stradal – Abenddämmerung
- Strauss J – Concert paraphrase on the waltz "Dorfschwalben aus Österreich"
- Wagner – Winterstürme wichen dem Wonnemond (from Die Walküre); Der Ritt der Walküren (from Die Walküre); Schluss des letzten Aufzuges (from Die Walküre) Waldweben (from Siegfried); Rheinfahrt aus dem Vorspiel (from Götterdämmerung); Trauermusik aus dem letzten Aufzug (from Götterdämmerung); Wesendonck-Lieder.
- Vivaldi / J.S. Bach – Organ Concerto in D minor
