= Reubke =

Reubke is a German surname. Notable people with the surname include:

- Adolf Reubke (1805–1875), German organ builder, father of Julius
- Julius Reubke (1834–1858), German composer, pianist, and organist
