= Julius Reubke =

German composer, pianist and organist (1834–1858)

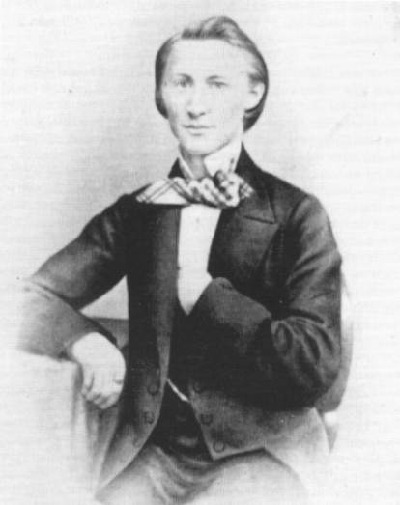
- Reubke, c. 1857
- Born: Friedrich Julius Reubke; 23 March 1834; Hausneindorf, Harz, Saxony-Anhalt, Germany
- Died: 3 June 1858 (aged 24); Pillnitz, Dresden, Saxony, Germany
- Occupations: Composer; pianist; organist
- Years active: 1848–1857
- Era: Romantic
- Father: Adolf Reubke

Friedrich Julius Reubke (23 March 1834 – 3 June 1858) was a German composer, pianist and organist associated with the school of Romanticism. A pupil of Franz Liszt, his small oeuvre includes the Sonata on the 94th Psalm in C minor, renowned as one of the finest organ works in the romantic repertoire.

== Biography ==
Born in Hausneindorf on 23 March 1834, a small village in the region of the Harz mountains, he was the eldest son of organ and piano builder Adolf Reubke (1805–1875). Of Julius's five siblings, two brothers, Emil (1836–1884) and Karl (1840–1860), worked with their father; Emil became a partner in 1860 and owned the company from 1872. His brother Otto (1842–1913) was also a pianist, organist and composer; he prepared the Sonata on the 94th Psalm for its first publication in August 1871. Otto settled in Halle, where he was a professor at the University of Halle and became its director in 1892. Reubke also had two sisters, Meta and Alma.

Reubke's first musical instruction was in Quedlinburg with Hermann Bönicke (1821–1879). He moved to Berlin in April or October 1851, where he continued his musical education at the conservatory there, which had been founded in November 1850 by Theodor Kullak. He studied piano with Kullak, composition with Adolf Bernhard Marx, and additionally, with Julius Stern. In Berlin, he encountered the Neudeutsche Schule with conductor Hans von Bülow and organist Alexander Winterberger, both associated with Franz Liszt.

When Liszt visited Berlin in December 1855, he arranged, on the recommendation of Bülow, to teach Reubke piano and composition from February 1856, in Weimar, and allowed him to live at the Altenburg house he kept. It was in this environment that Reubke composed his two major works, the Piano Sonata in B♭ minor, which he composed from December 1856 to March 1857, and the Sonata on the 94th Psalm in C minor, for organ, which he finished a month later; he also considered writing an opera. The organ sonata was dedicated to Professor Carl Riedel; its premiere was by Reubke on the Ladegast organ (1853–1855) of Merseburg Cathedral on 17 June 1857. Since its composition, it has been considered one of the pinnacles of the Romantic repertoire.

His health was already in decline at the time of his great compositions:

Playing us his sonata, seated in his characteristically bowed form at the piano, sunk in his creation, Reubke forgot everything about him; and we then looked at his pale appearance, at the unnatural shine of his gleaming eyes, heard his heavy breath, and were aware of how wordless fatigue overwhelmed him after such hours of excitement. We suspected then that he would not be with us long.

— Richard Pohl

He moved to Dresden in December 1857. By this time, he was suffering from worsening tuberculosis and did not have the energy to play or compose. He moved to the health resort in Pillnitz in May 1858, where he died at the Zum Goldenen Löwen inn a few days later, at the age of just 24. He was buried near the church of Maria am Wasser in Pillnitz-Hosterwitz on 7 June.

Reubke was one of Franz Liszt's favourite pupils; after his death, Liszt wrote in a letter of sympathy to Reubke's father: "Truly no one could feel more deeply the loss which art has suffered in your Julius, than the one who has followed with admiring sympathy his noble, constant, and successful strivings in these latter years, and who will ever bear his friendship faithfully in mind". Liszt's legacy was successfully perpetuated and instilled in his pupil, whose piano and organ sonatas were influenced by his Piano Sonata in B minor and Fantasy and Fugue on the chorale "Ad nos, ad salutarem undam", respectively.

== Compositions ==
=== Organ ===
- Trio in E♭ major (1848–49)
- Sonata on the 94th Psalm in C minor (1857)
- Adagio in E minor (1857); revised manualiter transcription of an extract of the Sonata on the 94th Psalm; album leaf for Princess Marie von Sayn-Wittgenstein (rediscovered in 2004)

=== Piano ===
- Mazurka in E major (1856)
- Scherzo in D minor, op. 3 (1856)
- Sonata in B♭ minor (1857)

=== Lost ===
==== Orchestral ====
- Ouverture

==== Organ ====
- Chorale-variation on O Haupt voll Blut und Wunden for organ

==== Vocal ====
- Songs for mezzo-soprano and piano

== Sources ==
=== General references ===
- Michael Gailit: Julius Reubke (1834–1858), notes to Kevin Bowyer's recording of The 94th Psalm, Nimbus Records, NI 5361 (1993)
