= Kolja Blacher =

German violin player

- Born: 1963 (age 62–63)
- Genre: Classical
- Occupation: Violinist
- Instrument: 1730 "Tritton" Stradivarius

Kolja Blacher (born 1963) is a German violin player. He plays the 1730 "Tritton" Stradivarius.

Aged 15, Blacher won the Jugend musiziert competition and studied violin with Dorothy DeLay at Juilliard in New York City. He then continued his studies with Sándor Végh. He was first concertmaster of the Berlin Philharmonic under Claudio Abbado from 1993 to 1999, and later at the Lucerne Festival Orchestra.

Blacher performed as a soloist with orchestras such as Berlin Philharmonic, Munich Philharmonic, NDR Symphony Orchestra, Leipzig Gewandhaus Orchestra, Orchestra di Santa Cecilia and Baltimore Symphony Orchestra. He has worked with conductors including Kirill Petrenko, Vladimir Jurowski, Dmitri Kitayenko, Mariss Jansons, Matthias Pintscher, Markus Stenz.

Kolja Blacher was born in Berlin, the son of the composer Boris Blacher and Gerty Blacher-Herzog; his sister is the actress Tatjana Blacher.

== Discography ==
Blacher has an extensive discography which includes:

- Bach: Violin Concertos; 2000; Naxos
- Shostakovich, Weinberg: Violin Sonatas; 2007; Haenssler
- Stravinsky: L'Histoire du soldat; 2010; Phil.Harmonie
- Bach: Partitas for Violin Nos. 2 & 3; 2010; Phil.Harmonie
- Brahms: Trio für Klavier, Violine und Horn; Klavierquartett Nr. 2; 2010
- Edward Elgar: Klavierquintett; Johannes Brahms: Streichquartett Op. 67; 2010
- Kolja Blacher plays Robert Schumann; 2011; Phil.Harmonie
- Schnittke & Prokofiev; 2011; Phil.Harmonie
- Eichberg / Beethoven; 2012; Phil.Harmonie
- Mieczyslaw Weinberg: Piano Trio; Violin Sonatina; Double Bass Sonata; 2014; Cpo / CPO
- Chopin: Cello Sonata; Piano Trio; 2014; Haenssler / Hänssler Classic
- Shostakovich: Symphony No. 15; Suite for Variety Orchestra; 2015; Phil.Harmonie
- Schönberg: Pelleas und Melisande; Concerto for Violin and Orchestra; 2015; Oehms Classics
- Carl Nielsen: Violinkonzert; 2016; Acousence Classics
- Blacher; 2016; Phil.Harmonie
- Bernstein, Haydn; 2017; Coviello Classics
