= Piano Sonata (Reubke) =

1857 composition by Julius Reubke

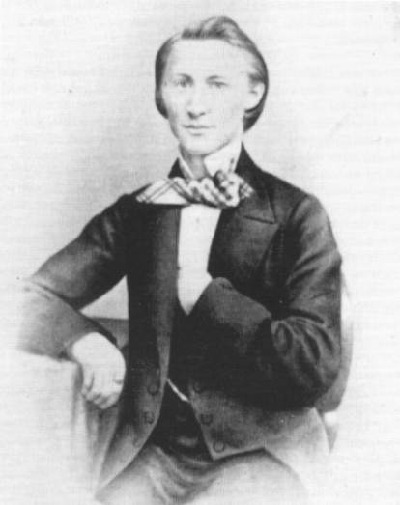
Julius Reubke ca. 1857

The Piano Sonata in B♭ minor is a work written by German composer Julius Reubke between December 1856 and March 1857. Although it remains very obscure and is little performed (unlike the composer's Sonata on the 94th Psalm for organ), it combines the Lisztian technique of thematic transformation, colourful harmonies, virtuosic piano writing and a wide array of characters and sentiments.

The sonata was published posthumously, edited by the composer's brother, in 1871.

== Description ==
The work opens with an Allegro maestoso, characterised by a dramatic, rising forte first subject. This rising motif (a semitone followed by a major third jump), is a significant theme of the movement, recalled at various points throughout (including the cadenza-like passagework). The main theme is built over a chordal structure of i, ♭II^{6}, vii^{o7}, i^{4-3}, v, and VI^{6/4}. The work has other, similarly interesting modulations, presented as undecorated chordal series. The second theme, marked Quasi Recitativo is written in a free and vocal style. Its melancholy second subject, in the distant key of E major, recalls something of Reubke's own sadly short life.
