= Fantasy and Fugue on the chorale "Ad nos, ad salutarem undam" =

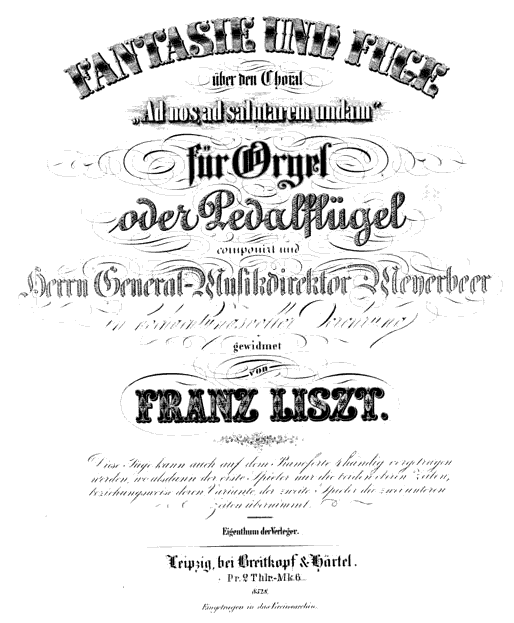
Cover of the first edition, for organ or pedal piano.

The Fantasy and Fugue on the chorale "Ad nos, ad salutarem undam", S.259, is a piece of organ music composed by Franz Liszt in the winter of 1850 when he was in Weimar. The chorale on which the Fantasy and Fugue is based was from Act I of Giacomo Meyerbeer's opera Le prophète. The work is dedicated to Meyerbeer, and it was given its premiere on October 29, 1852. The revised version was premiered in the Merseburg Cathedral on September 26, 1855, with Alexander Winterberger performing. The whole work was published by Breitkopf & Härtel in 1852, and the fugue was additionally published as the 4th piece of Liszt's operatic fantasy "Illustrations du Prophète" (S.414). A piano duet version by Liszt appeared during the same time (S.624).

== Form ==
Sound example: Victor-Antonio Agura performs on the Klais organ (1907) of St. Clemens Dortmund-Hombruch

The piece consists of three sections:

1. Fantasy: opens with the "Ad nos" theme and then turns quiet and contemplative. The theme returns and eventually a climax is reached. A second climactic passage follows, after which this section ends.
2. Adagio: serves as a development section, beginning quietly, the theme moving to major keys now from the minor keys of the preceding section. The piece brightens a bit in the latter half of this section.
3. Fugue: serves as the finale, but also, within the sonata-form, as the recapitulation and coda. Elements from the previous sections appear again. The piece ends with a triumphant coda, on full organ.

A typical performance lasts nearly half an hour, although performances of the composition by Liszt and by Winterberger lasted, according to contemporary reports, an average of forty-five minutes.

== Transcriptions ==
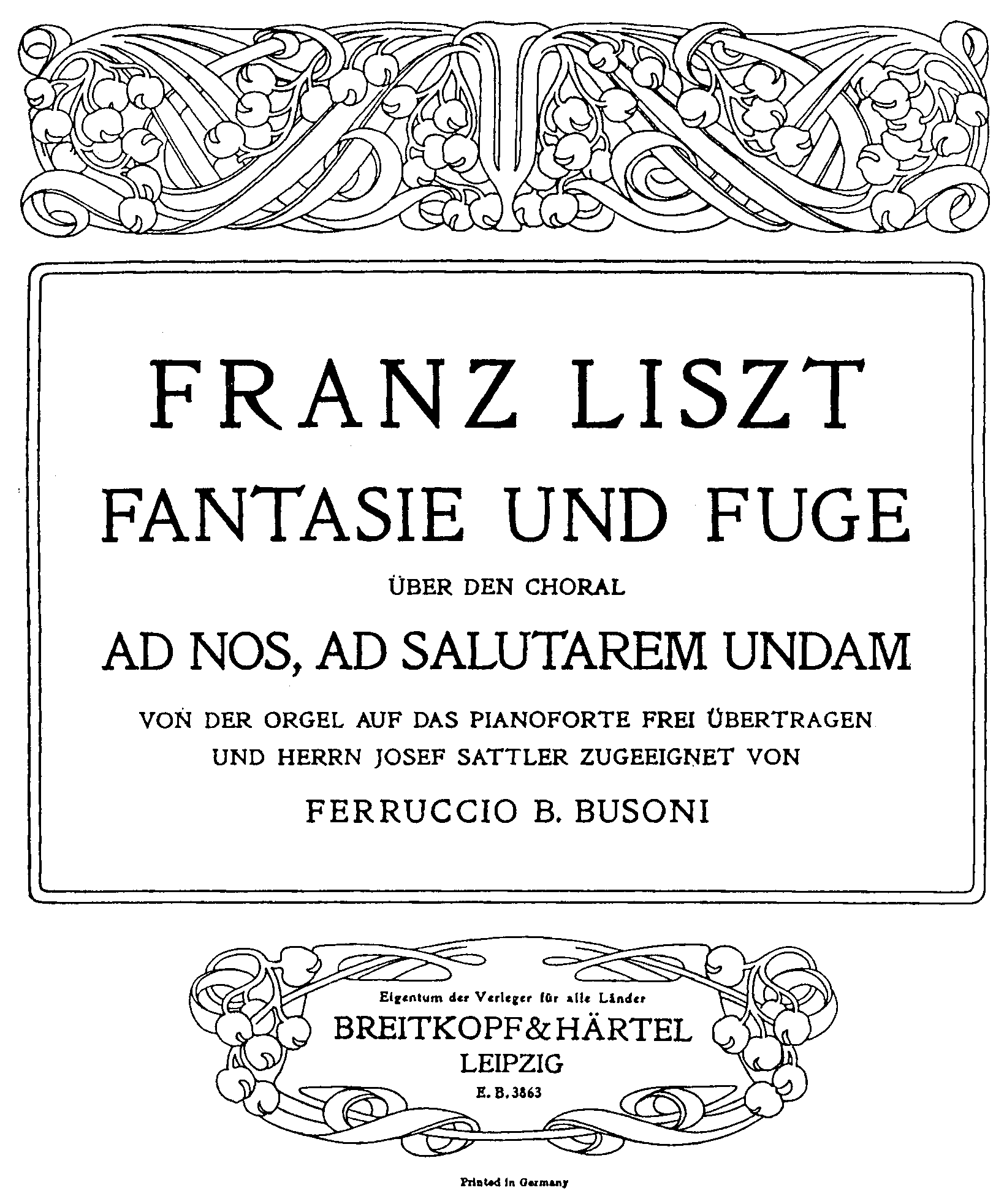
Cover of Busoni's piano transcription

Ferruccio Busoni prepared a piano arrangement which was published in 1897 by Breitkopf & Härtel. Alan Walker, Liszt's biographer, said that it "represents one of the pinnacles of twentieth-century virtuosity." Liszt at least once performed his own piano transcription, of which Walter Bache, his student, made an account in 1862. Liszt never seems to have notated such a version.

Hugo Kaun and Wilhelm Middelschulte created an arrangement for orchestra and organ. The premiere was on March 29, 1901, at Symphony Center, Chicago, conducted by Theodore Thomas, with Middelschulte as the organist. Marcel Dupré also created an organ-orchestra arrangement.

German conductor Florian Csizmadia wrote an orchestration for orchestra alone which was premiered on March 1, 2022 in Greifswald, Germany.
