= Merseburg Cathedral =

- Dom St. Johannes und St. Laurentius
- Merseburger Dom
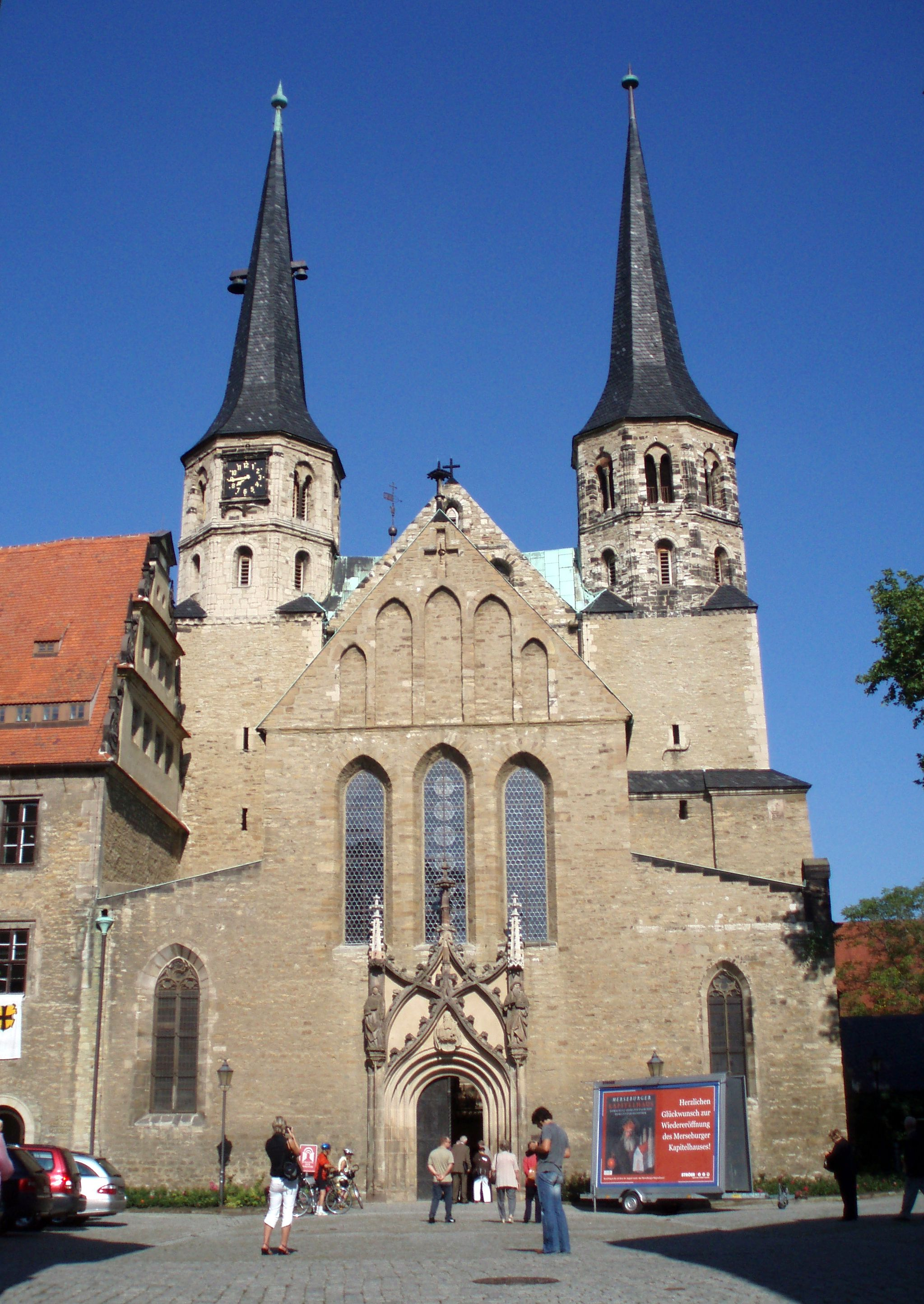
- Merseburg Cathedral, western towers and main portal

- Location within Saxony-Anhalt Location within Germany
- 51°21′32″N 12°0′3″E
- Location: Merseburg
- Country: Germany
- Denomination: Evangelical Church in Central Germany
- Previous denomination: Roman Catholic

History
- Status: Active
- Founded: 11th century

Architecture
- Style: Gothic

Merseburg Cathedral (German: Merseburger Dom) is the proto-cathedral of the former Bishopric of Merseburg in Merseburg, Germany. The mostly Gothic church is considered an artistic and historical highlight in southern Saxony-Anhalt.

== History ==
=== Background ===
Merseburg acquired importance beyond the immediate region in the 10th century when it came to King Heinrich I (Henry I) by marriage. He built a Kaiserpfalz there overlooking the Saale and founded a church next to it, consecrated in 919. His son and successor, Otto I swore an oath on 10 August 955 to establish a diocese at Merseburg if God would grant him victory at the upcoming Battle of Lechfeld. In 968, the Diocese of Merseburg was established but dissolved in 981. In 1004 it was reestablished by King Heinrich II (Henry II).

=== Early Romanesque cathedral ===
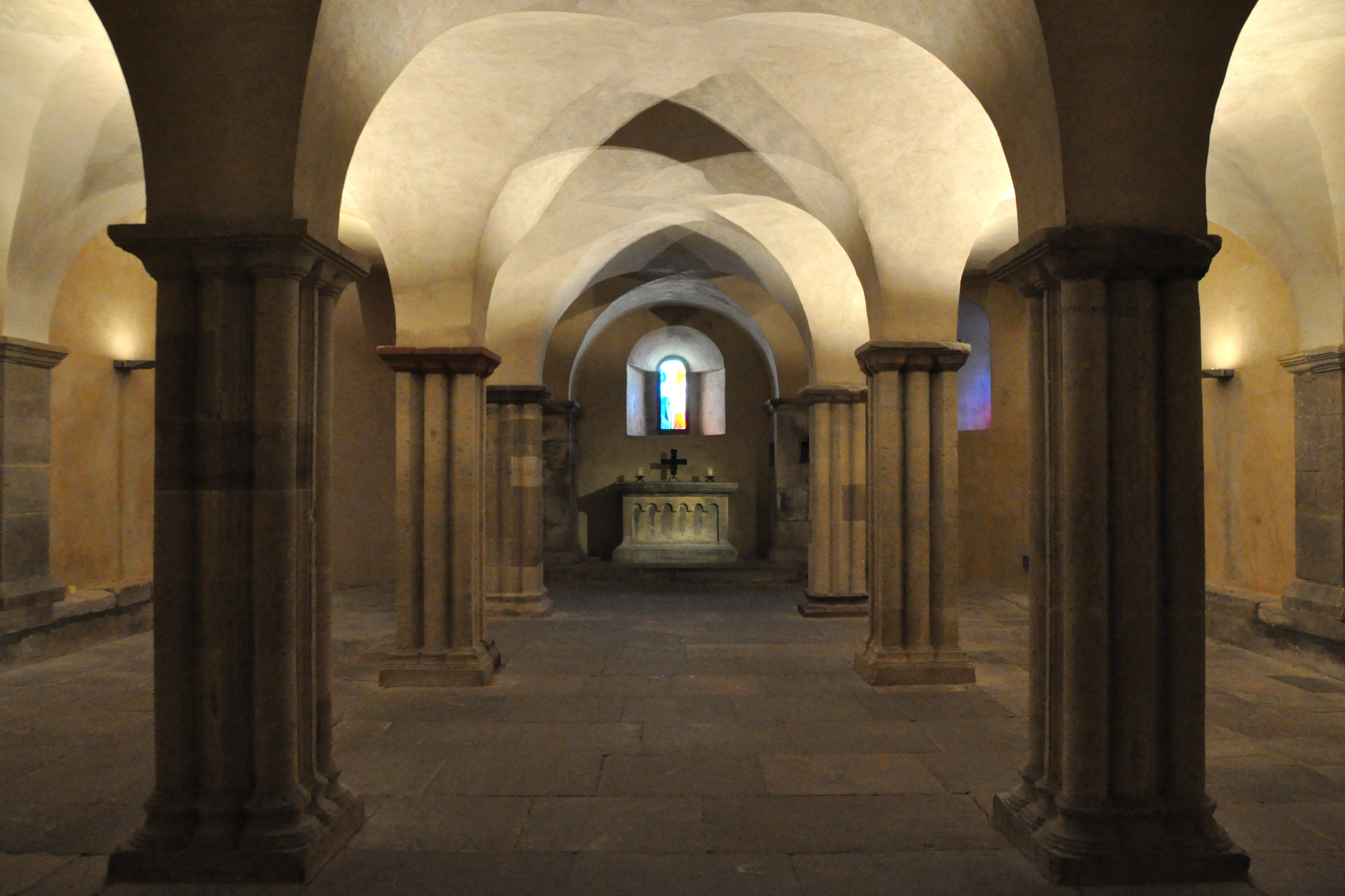
Crypt

Construction of the early Romanesque cathedral was begun by Bishop Thietmar of Merseburg in 1015. It was consecrated on 1 October 1021 in the presence of Emperor Heinrich II (Henry II) and his wife, Kunigunde.

However, the eastern part of the building collapsed twice within a few years and had to be rebuilt. It was only on 29 June 1042 that the cathedral was formally opened. Despite later construction, this early Romanesque structure still influences the appearance of today's cathedral. The lower parts of sanctuary (or choir), transept and western towers remain Romanesque as do the eastern towers almost to their roofs. Only the crypt still maintains the original spatial impression, however. The hall crypt is one of the oldest mostly unchanged structures of this type in Germany.

=== Late Romanesque/early Gothic ===
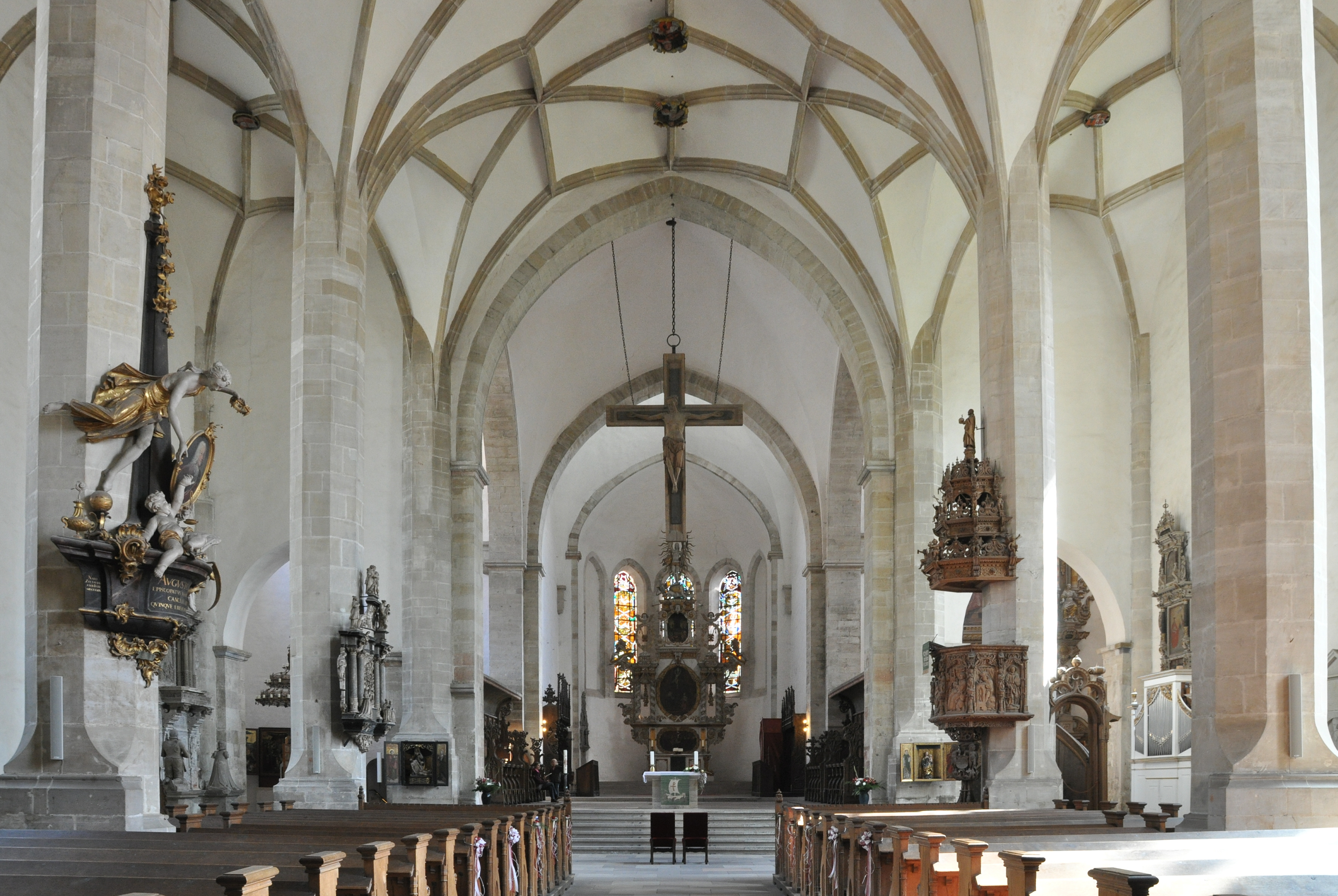
View of the interior along the nave towards the high altar

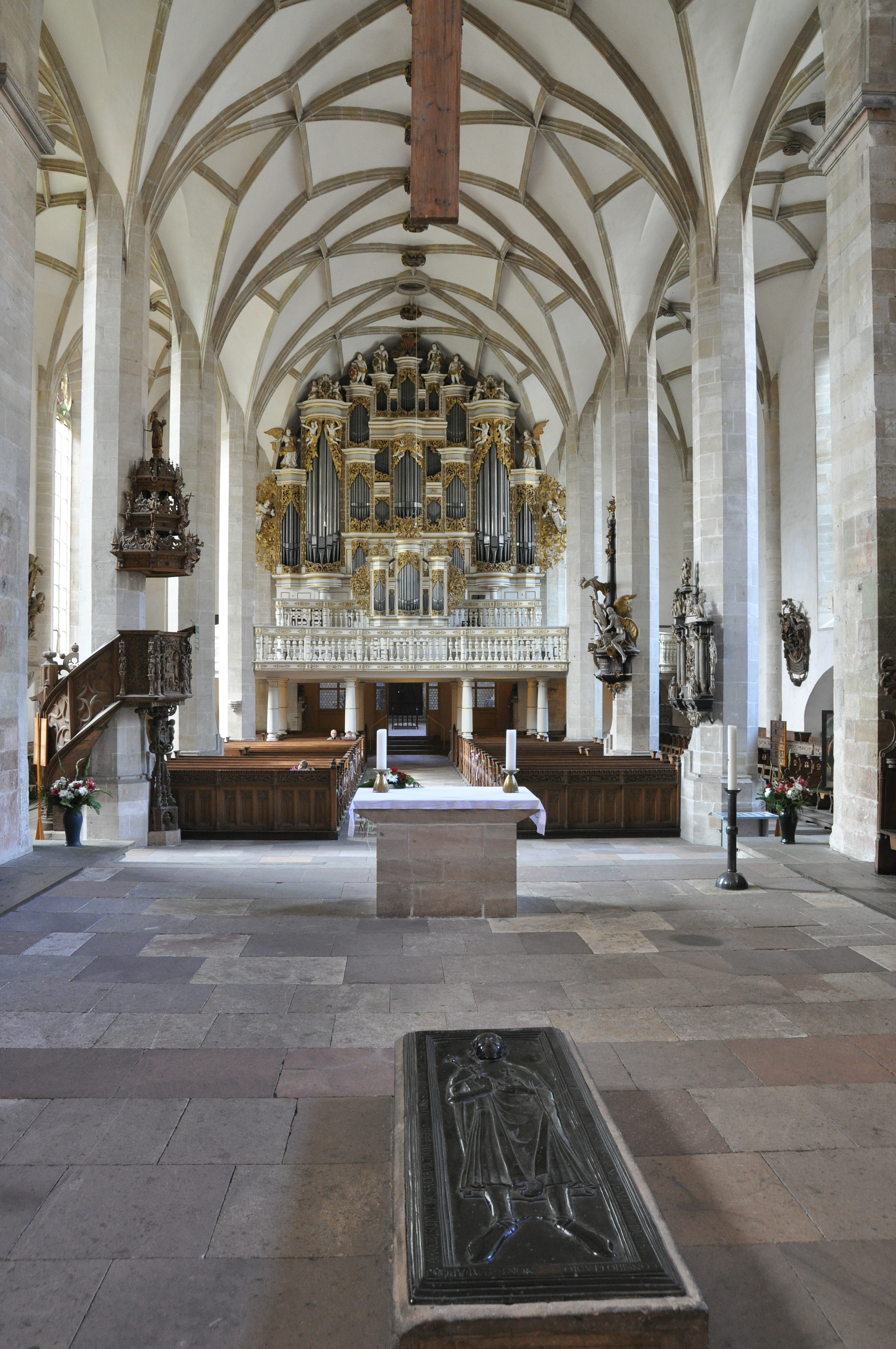
View of the interior with the organ in the back and the tomb of Rudolf of Rheinfelden in front

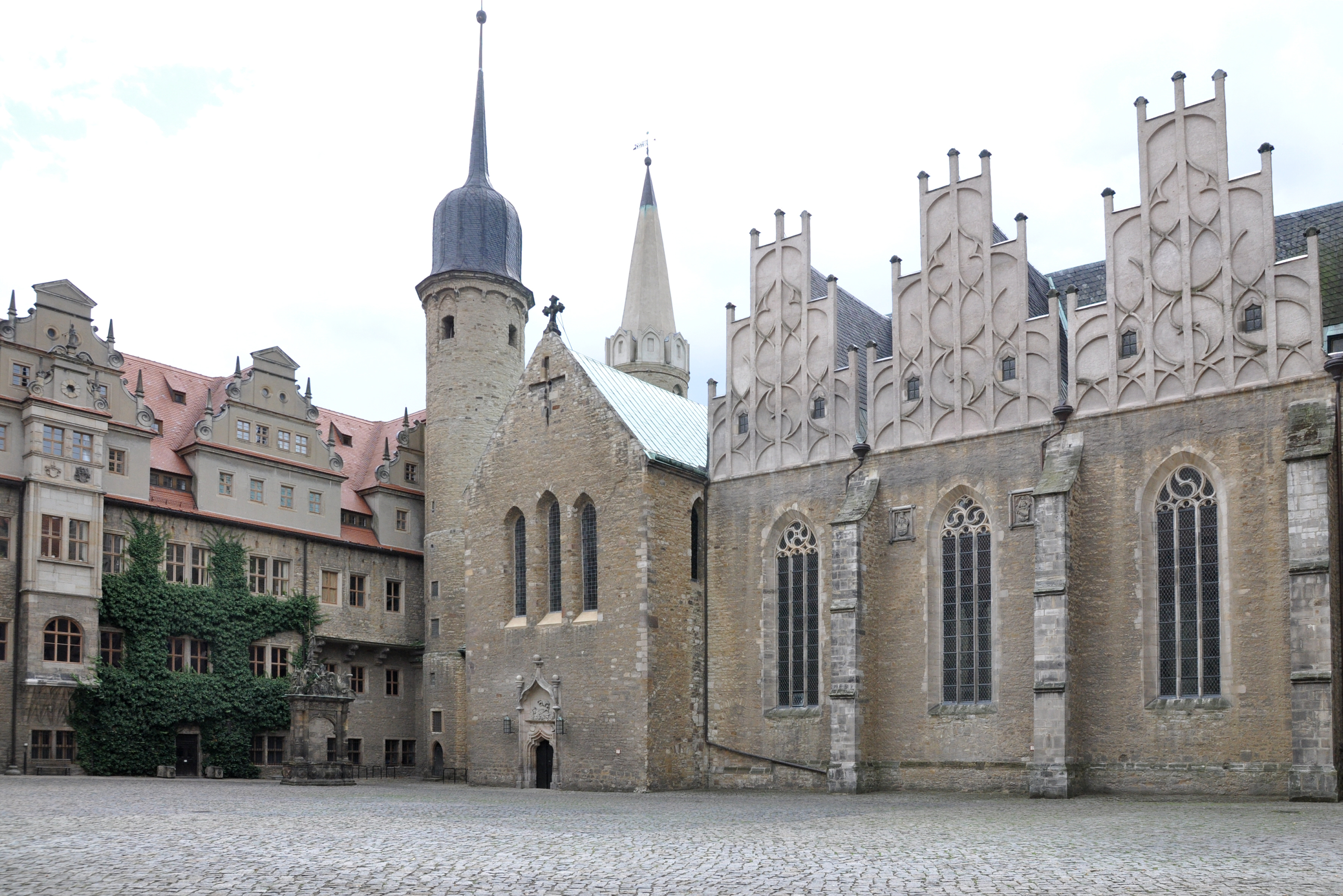
Eastern towers, northern façade and part of the Schloss (on the left)

Around the middle of the 12th century the western towers were rebuilt, with late Romanesque octagonal upper levels put on top of the lower quadratic structures. The earlier quarry stone masonry was replaced by worked stones. The shape of the windows was later changed to Gothic style, probably in the second quarter of the 13th century when a new porch (or narthex) was added to the church. This was built circa 1230.

At the same time, western façade, western towers and the part in between including transept and sanctuary were mostly reconstructed under Bishop Ekkehard Rabils (1215/6-1240). It is also likely that the nave was changed substantially and largely attained its final form. Two vestries accessible from the sanctuary were likely also added during this period. The southern one today houses the treasury and the manuscript collection. Finally, the eastern towers were raised around the middle of the 13th century. One of them retains a Gothic roof, the other is topped by a Baroque roof.

=== Late Gothic hall church ===
Under Bishop Thilo von Trotha (1466–1514) the nave was rebuilt, due to the building of the adjacent Schloss/palace. The old nave was demolished in 1510 and the new nave built between 1510 (cornerstone laid) and 1514 (roof added). Von Trotha's successor, Adolf von Anhalt (1514–26) completed the work. The consecration was in 1517.

In 1515 the west portal was added. From 1535 to 1537 the porch was redesigned as the burial chapel of Bishop Sigismund von Lindenau. The rood screen was demolished in 1588.

=== Later history and renovations ===
Since the Reformation the cathedral has not been the seat of a bishop. Martin Luther gave a sermon here in August 1545.

Renovations aimed at restoring the "original" look of the church took place in 1839, 1844/5 and 1883–6, Baroque elements were mostly removed (excluding the tombs, high altar, organ and the façade of the princely vault).

Damage sustained by palace and cathedral during World War II bombing were repaired starting in 1946. The interior was only finished in 1955. More exterior repairs followed in 1962-71 and the interior was renovated in 1972–4. Following reunification in 1990 (and especially after 2003) more extensive work was done both on the exterior and interior of the cathedral.

A statue of Thietmar von Merseburg was added to the cloister in 2007.

== Today ==
The church is now owned and used by a Protestant congregation within the Evangelical Church in Central Germany.

It is open to the public. The Treasury exhibits altars from the 16th century, liturgical equipment, the so-called cloak of Otto I and the hand of Rudolf of Rheinfelden. The manuscript vault contains a 13th-century Bible, a fragment of the Ravenna Annals, a manuscript from the 9th century and a 10th-century sacramentary. The incantations vault holds a facsimile of the Merseburg Incantations or Merseburger Zaubersprüche. The southern wing now houses de:Europäisches Romanik Zentrum (European Centre for Romanesque Art).

Merseburg Cathedral is known in musical circles for its large romantic organ, built by Friedrich Ladegast in the mid-19th century.

Merseburg Cathedral also had a brief appearance in the 2014 film "The Monuments Men", directed by George Clooney.
